= Countess Palatine Hedwig Elisabeth of Neuburg =

Hedwig Elisabeth
- Princess Sobieski
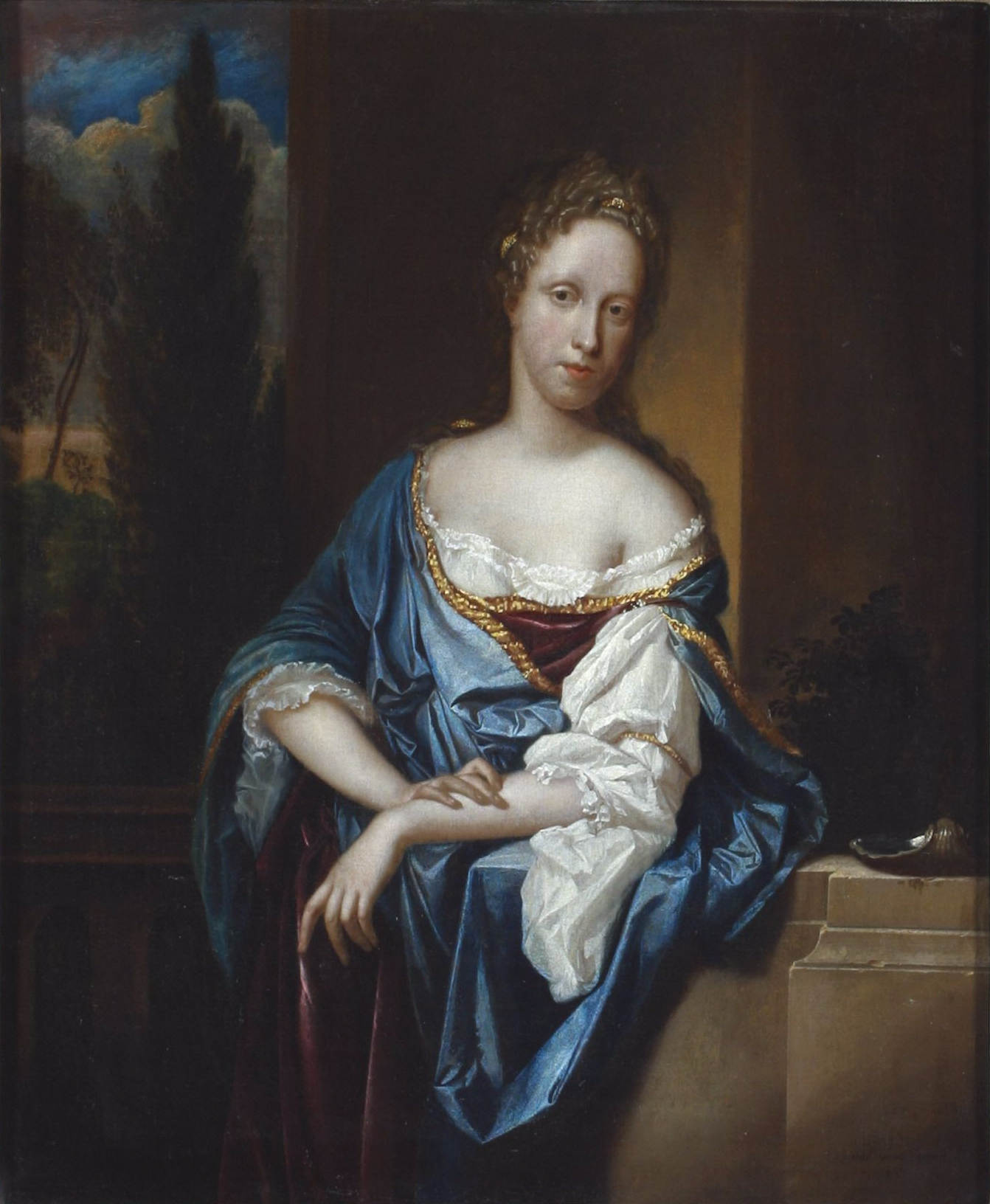
- Hedwig by Adriaen van der Werff
- Born: 18 July 1673; Stadtschloss, Düsseldorf, Duchy of Berg
- Died: 10 August 1722 (aged 49); Wrocław, Poland
- Burial: St. Kazimierz Church, Warsaw, Poland
- Spouse: James Louis Sobieski
- Issue Detail: Maria Karolina, Duchess of Bouillon; Maria Clementina, Titular Queen of England
- House: Wittelsbach
- Father: Philip William, Elector Palatine
- Mother: Elisabeth Amalie of Hesse-Darmstadt

Hedwig Elisabeth of Neuburg (Polish: Jadwiga Elżbieta Amalia Sobieska; 18 July 1673 – 10 August 1722) was a Polish princess by marriage to James Louis Sobieski. She was the daughter of Philip William, Duke of Neuburg and Landgravine Elisabeth Amalie of Hesse-Darmstadt.

She was the grandmother of Charles Edward Stuart, the "Young Pretender" also known as ”Bonnie Prince Charlie".

== Life ==
Born at the Stadtschloss in Düsseldorf, she was the fifteenth of seventeen children. Her sisters included Eleonor Magdalene, Holy Roman Empress, Maria Sofia, Queen of Portugal, Maria Anna, Queen of Spain and Dorothea Sophie, Duchess of Parma and mother of queen Elisabeth Farnese. She was raised with her sisters Maria Sophia, Maria Anna and Dorothea Sophie. The sisters were schooled by private tutors in German, Latin, French, Italian, music and dance. Her elder sister Eleonor Magdalene acted as the benefactor of her sisters at the Imperial court.

=== Marriage ===
In 1689, she was suggested to marry Prince James Louis Henry Sobieski, son of King John III Sobieski of Poland. The marriage was arranged in order to secure an alliance between John III Sobieski and the Emperor within the Holy League, as Hedwig Elisabeth was the sister of Empress Eleonor Magdalene, and secure Habsburg support in the future election of Prince James as the next Polish king. From the part of her family, the marriage was arranged with the presumption that Prince James would have a good chance to be elected king of Poland after the death of his father.

In the negotiations, it was specified that Hedwig Elisabeth would be secured a dowry of 100 000 thaler, and granted lands by the emperor in Silesia with an official residence in Oława, where the couple could settle comfortably under Imperial protection in the case Prince James would not be elected king after his father's death.

The wedding took place on 8 February 1691, and the couple settled in an apartment in the Royal Palace in Warsaw - they would share their place of residence in the Kazimierzowski Palace in Warsaw during the winters, and their property in Oława in Silesia during the summers, where she stayed during the Moldau campaign.

=== Poland ===
Hedwig Elisabeth was friendly received by her mother-in-law, queen Maria Kazimiera, who actively wanted to win her trust and affection and thus treated her with consideration and charm and gave her several valuable gifts. She did, however, dislike Hedwig Elisabeth's German household retinue, as she considered them an obstacle for her daughter-in-law to acclimatize to Poland, and doubted that the Habsburg and Neuburg dynasties would support her son as future king.

The relationship between Hedwig Elisabeth and Prince James has been given contradictory accounts. Prince James reportedly placed too high demands on everybody around him, including his wife, but he affectionately referred to her as Little Liesl and did sometimes listen to her advice. Hedwig Elisabeth was described as a devoted spouse who made great efforts to work for his benefit and give him useful advice to curb unwise actions. In her capacity as a relative of the emperor, she was expected to play the part of a channel and mediator between the Emperor and her in-laws, a task she was asked to perform on several occasions.

From the beginning, Hedwig Elisabeth was put under pressure to produce a male heir to strengthen her husband's future candidacy to the throne. Already in 1691, she had a miscarriage, and the following year, her mother-in-law is known to have recommended her medicine to prevent another miscarriage. In the spring of 1693, she welcomed her mother on a visit to Oława. On 30 May 1693, she gave birth to her first living child, Maria Leopoldyna, in Warsaw in the presence of her parents-in-law and the royal senators.

In 1696, her father-in-law died, and in the following election of 1696-97, the courts of Vienna and Dusseldorf did support Prince James as candidate for the Polish throne. Hedwig Elisabeth reportedly actively participated in the work to raise funds for the election: she negotiated with the burghers of Wrocław to secure loans for her husband's campaign, and she personally received money and jewels from the imperial court of Vienna to use as security for the campaign loans. Despite the efforts, however, the Sobieski Party lost the election.

=== Later life ===
The couple retired to their lands in Silesia where they lived under Imperial protection. The failure to produce a living son was still a pressure upon Hedwig Elisabeth, but her mother-in-law commented that a son could sometimes be the cause of a family's ruin as well as a blessing, while a daughter could be a blessing, as Hedwig Elisabeth's sister the empress had been for her family. She continued to give birth until 1717, the last birth nearly killing her.

In 1704, during the imprisonment of her spouse and brother-in-law, Hedwig Elisabeth visited the Imperial court in Vienna to use her influence as a relation of the emperor in their favor and negotiate their release. She performed the task despite being heavily pregnant, which caused her a miscarriage. When Peter the Great offered to place James on the Polish throne, he sent his envoy to Hedwig Elisabeth rather than James to make the offer, expecting her to persuade her husband, but she refused.

When her daughter Maria Clementina married James Stuart against the consent of the emperor in 1719, prince James as well as Hedvig Elisabeth herself was held in house arrest in Innsbruck, and was only released and allowed to return to Oława after the mediation of her sisters, Empress Eleonora and Duchess Dorothea Sofia: her husband, however, was exiled from Silesia. The last years of her life she suffered from ill health. On her deathbed, she successfully asked the emperor to allow her spouse to return home and to see to the welfare of her daughters, and her husband was allowed home to attend to her deathbed.

Hedwig Elisabeth was the maternal grandmother of Bonnie Prince Charlie, and the great-aunt of Maria Theresa of Austria.

== Issue ==
1. Maria Joanna Leopoldyna (30 April 1693 – 12 July 1695).
2. Maria Kazimiera (20 January 1695 – 18 May 1723) - she became a nun. Her father proposed a marriage between her and Charles XII of Sweden, however, the plans did not come to fruition.
3. Jan (born in 1695/1696, died in 1696).
4. Maria Karolina Katarzyna, known as Charlotte (25 November 1697 – 8 May 1740) married twice; firstly to Frédéric Casimir de La Tour d'Auvergne, no issue; married again Charles Godefroy de La Tour d'Auvergne and had issue.
5. Jan (21 October 1698 – July 1699).
6. Maria Klementyna (18 July 1702 – 24 January 1735), married James Francis Edward Stuart (1688–1766), son of King James II of England (1633–1701) and had issue.
7. Maria Magdalena (born and died 3 August 1704).

== Ancestry ==
Ancestors of Countess Palatine Hedwig Elisabeth of Neuburg

8. Philip Louis, Count Palatine of Neuburg
4. Wolfgang Wilhelm, Count Palatine of Neuburg
9. Duchess Anna of Cleves
2. Philipp Wilhelm, Elector Palatine
10. William V, Duke of Bavaria
5. Duchess Magdalene of Bavaria
11. Duchess Renata of Lorraine
1. Hedwig Elisabeth Amelia of the Palatinate-Neuburg
12. Louis V, Landgrave of Hesse-Darmstadt
6. George II, Landgrave of Hesse-Darmstadt
13. Margravine Magdalena of Brandenburg
3. Landgravine Elisabeth Amalie of Hesse-Darmstadt
14. John George I, Elector of Saxony
7. Princess Sophia Eleonore of Saxony
15. Duchess Magdalene Sibylle of Prussia
