= Frederick Wilhelm von Pfalz-Neuburg =

German noble

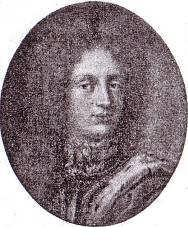
Count Palatine Friedrich Wilhelm of Neuburg

Friedrich Wilhelm of Neuburg (20 July 1665 – 23 July 1689) was a Count Palatine of Neuburg by birth and Imperial General in later life.

== Life ==
Born in Düsseldorf, he was the tenth child and seventh son of Philip William, Elector Palatine and Landgravine Elisabeth Amalie of Hesse-Darmstadt.

Initially destined to the Church, in 1677 he was appointed Coadjutor and in 1685 Canon in Konstanz. Also, he studied at the Heidelberg University, where he was Rector in 1685.

Later, Frederick Wilhelm abandoned the church career and entered the Imperial army, where he obtained the rank of General. He fell in the Nine Years' War during the Siege of Mainz (1689), where, during a visit in the trenches, an arquebus shot to the head killed him instantly. He was buried in St. Andrew's Church, Düsseldorf.

== Ancestry ==
Ancestors of Frederick Wilhelm von Pfalz-Neuburg

16. Wolfgang, Count Palatine of Zweibrücken
8. Philip Louis, Count Palatine of Neuburg
17. Landgravine Anna of Hesse
4. Wolfgang Wilhelm, Count Palatine of Neuburg
18. William, Duke of Jülich-Cleves-Berg
9. Anna of Cleves
19. Archduchess Maria of Austria
2. Philipp Wilhelm, Elector Palatine
20. Albert V, Duke of Bavaria
10. William V, Duke of Bavaria
21. Archduchess Anna of Austria
5. Duchess Magdalene of Bavaria
22. Francis I, Duke of Lorraine
11. Princess Renata of Lorraine
23. Princess Christina of Denmark and Norway
1. Friedrich Wilhelm of Neuburg
24. George I, Landgrave of Hesse-Darmstadt
12. Louis V, Landgrave of Hesse-Darmstadt
25. Countess Magdalene of Lippe
6. George II, Landgrave of Hesse-Darmstadt
26. John George, Elector of Brandenburg
13. Margravine Magdalena of Brandenburg
27. Princess Elisabeth of Anhalt-Zerbst
3. Landgravine Elisabeth Amalie of Hesse-Darmstadt
28. Christian I, Elector of Saxony
14. John George I, Elector of Saxony
29. Margravine Sophie of Brandenburg
7. Princess Sophia Eleonore of Saxony
30. Albert Frederick, Duke of Prussia
15. Duchess Magdalene Sibylle of Prussia
31. Duchess Marie Eleonore of Cleves
