= Wolfgang George Frederick von Pfalz-Neuburg =

Wolfgang George Frederick
- Prince-Bishop of Breslau
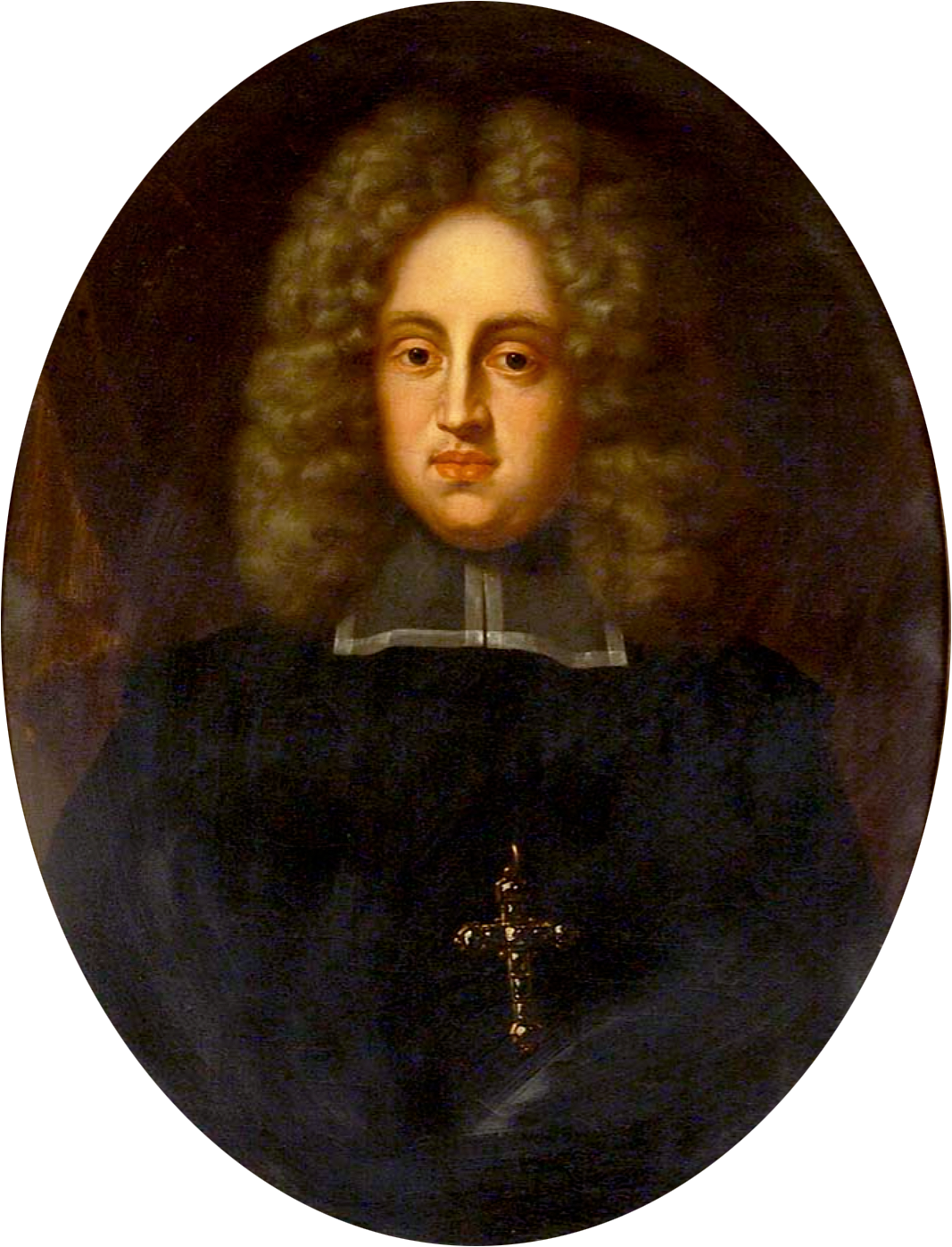
- Portrait by Jan Frans van Douven in the Villa del Poggio Imperiale
- Born: 5 June 1659; Düsseldorf
- Died: 4 June 1683 (aged 23); Wiener Neustadt
- Burial: Neuburg an der Donau
- House: Wittelsbach
- Father: Philip William, Elector Palatine
- Mother: Landgravine Elisabeth Amalie of Hesse-Darmstadt

Wolfgang George Frederick Franz von Pfalz-Neuburg (5 June 1659 – 4 June 1683) was an Auxiliary Bishop in the Diocese of Köln and elected Prince-Bishop of Breslau (Wrocław) shortly before his death.

== Life ==
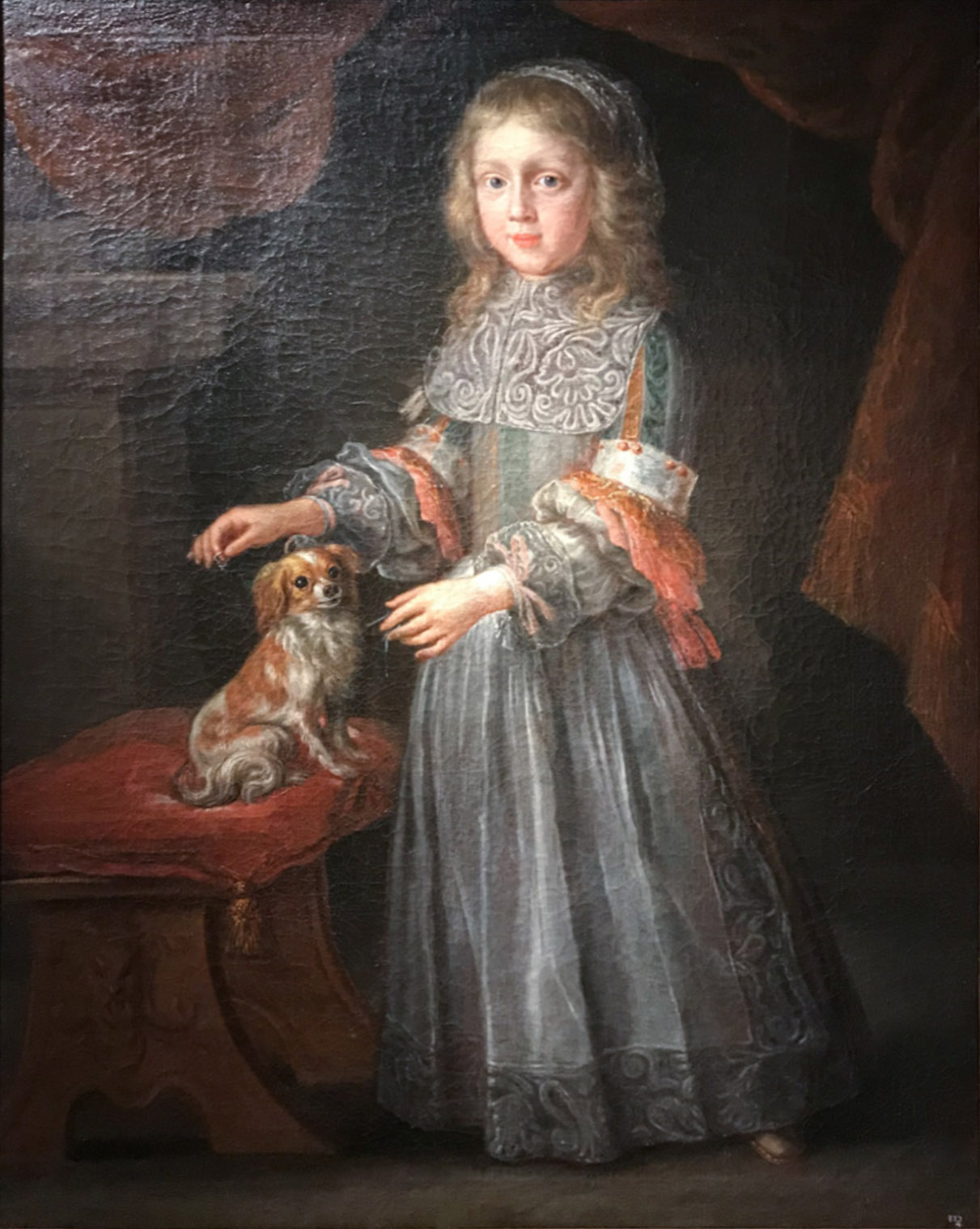
Wolfgang George as a child

Born in Düsseldorf, he was the fifth child but second son of Philip William, Elector Palatine and Landgravine Elisabeth Amalie of Hesse-Darmstadt.

Since his older brother Johann Wilhelm was to succeed his father in all the secular offices, he was destined for the church. Wolfgang Georg was appointed Auxiliary bishop of Köln and later elected Prince-Bishop of the Diocese of Breslau (Wrocław); however, he suddenly died before the coming election by a papal audience in Rome, one day before his 25th birthday in Wiener Neustadt.

He was buried in the Hofkirche in Neuburg an der Donau. His grave stone still exists in the St. George Cathedral of Wiener Neustadt. In his place, his younger brother was Franz Ludwig appointed Prince-Bishop of Breslau.

== Ancestry ==
Ancestors of Wolfgang George Frederick von Pfalz-Neuburg

8. Philip Louis, Count Palatine of Neuburg
4. Wolfgang Wilhelm, Count Palatine of Neuburg
9. Anna of Cleves
2. Philipp Wilhelm, Elector Palatine
10. William V, Duke of Bavaria
5. Duchess Magdalene of Bavaria
11. Duchess Renata of Lorraine
1. Wolfgang George of the Palatinate-Neuburg
12. Louis V, Landgrave of Hesse-Darmstadt
6. George II, Landgrave of Hesse-Darmstadt
13. Margravine Magdalena of Brandenburg
3. Landgravine Elisabeth Amalie of Hesse-Darmstadt
14. John George I, Elector of Saxony
7. Princess Sophia Eleonore of Saxony
15. Duchess Magdalene Sibylle of Prussia
