= Francis Louis of Palatinate-Neuburg =

Archbishop of Mainz (1664–1732)

- Archbishop of Mainz
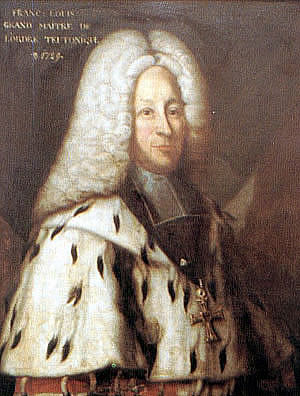
- Church: Catholic Church
- Diocese: Electorate of Mainz
- In office: 1729–1732
- Previous posts: Archbishop of Trier (1716–29); Coadjutor Archbishop of Mainz (1710–16); Bishop of Worms (1694–1710); Bishop of Wrocław (1683–94)

Personal details
- Born: 18 July 1664
- Died: 6 April 1732 (aged 67)

Francis Louis of Palatinate-Neuburg (Franz Ludwig von Pfalz-Neuburg; 18 July 1664 – 6 April 1732) was bishop and archbishop of several dioceses, prince-elector of the Holy Roman Empire, and Hochmeister of the Teutonic Order.

== Life ==
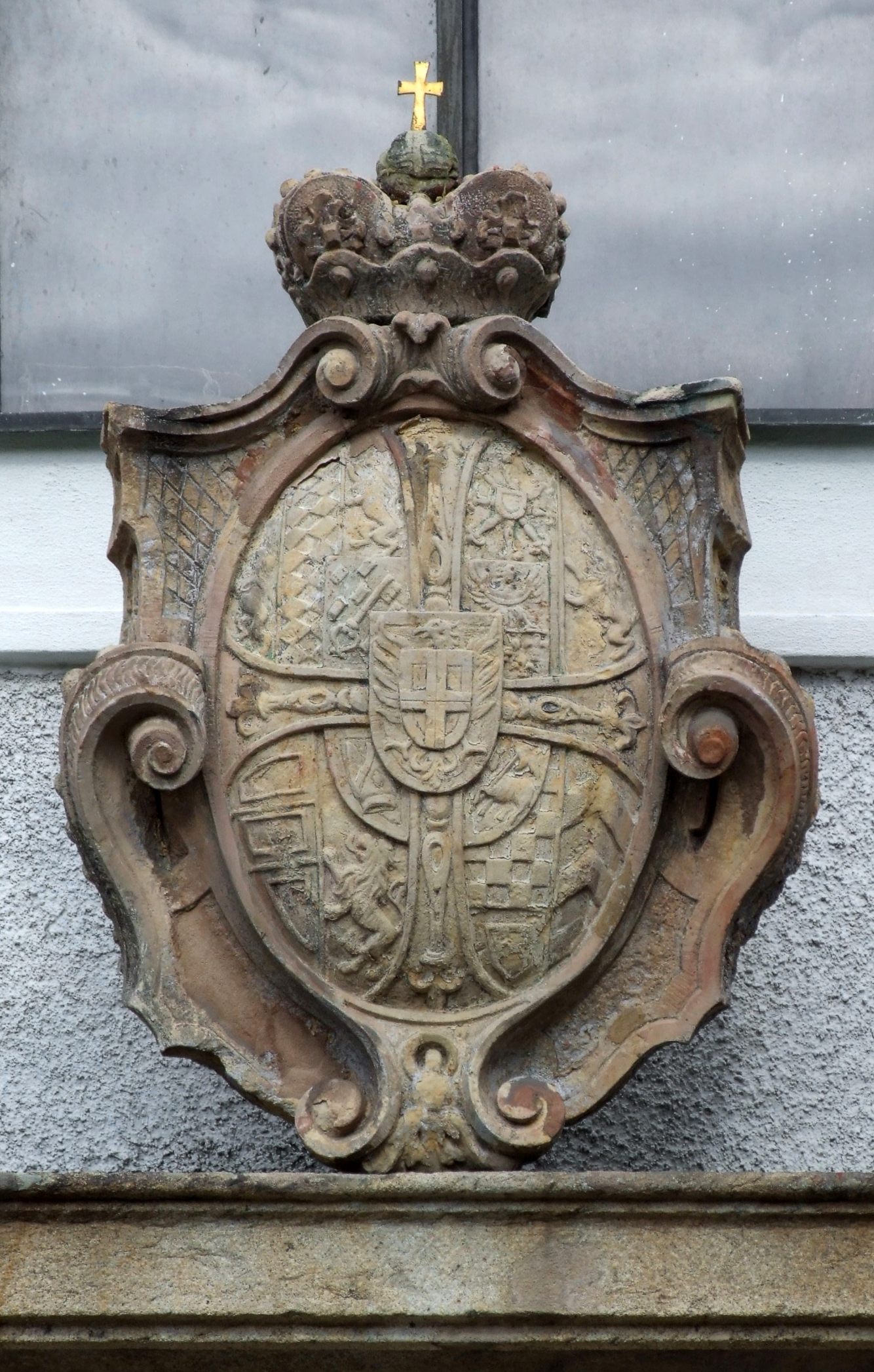
Coat of arms of Pfalz

He was born in Neuburg an der Donau as son of Philip William, Elector Palatine and Landgravine Elisabeth Amalie of Hesse-Darmstadt.

In 1683, he became Prince-Bishop of Breslau (Wrocław) after the death of his brother Wolfgang Georg, who should have held this office.

In 1694, he assumed the additional offices of Hochmeister of the Teutonic Order and Prince-Bishop of Worms. 1716, he became Archbishop-Elector of Trier. During his rule in Trier, he reorganized the jurisdiction in the diocese and advanced the renovation of the Roman Moselle bridge and the cathedral. He became Archbishop-Elector of Mainz in 1729, giving up the position in Trier as the Pope had prohibited a merging of the two Archbishoprics. In Mainz, Franz Ludwig also started some administrative and judicial reforms as well as the construction of the Deutschhaus. In Worms, he started the reconstruction of the Bischofshof palace, which was destroyed in 1689.

Franz Ludwig died in Breslau (Wrocław) and is buried there in a specially built chapel in Wrocław Cathedral.

== Ancestry ==
Ancestors of Francis Louis of Palatinate-Neuburg

8. Philip Louis, Count Palatine of Neuburg
4. Wolfgang Wilhelm, Count Palatine of Neuburg
9. Anna of Cleves
2. Philipp Wilhelm, Elector Palatine
10. William V, Duke of Bavaria
5. Duchess Magdalene of Bavaria
11. Duchess Renata of Lorraine
1. Francis Louis of the Palatinate-Neuburg
12. Louis V, Landgrave of Hesse-Darmstadt
6. George II, Landgrave of Hesse-Darmstadt
13. Margravine Magdalena of Brandenburg
3. Landgravine Elisabeth Amalie of Hesse-Darmstadt
14. John George I, Elector of Saxony
7. Princess Sophia Eleonore of Saxony
15. Duchess Magdalene Sibylle of Prussia

== Bibliography ==
- Alessandro Cont, La Chiesa dei principi. Le relazioni tra Reichskirche, dinastie sovrane tedesche e stati italiani (1688-1763), preface of Elisabeth Garms-Cornides, Trento, Provincia autonoma di Trento, 2018, pp. 103–138, https://www.academia.edu/38170694/La_Chiesa_dei_principi._Le_relazioni_tra_Reichskirche_dinastie_sovrane_tedesche_e_stati_italiani_1688-1763_prefazione_di_Elisabeth_Garms-Cornides_Trento_Provincia_autonoma_di_Trento_2018

Francis Louis of Palatinate-Neuburg House of Wittelsbach Born: 18 July 1664 in Neuburg upon Danube Died: 6 April 1732 in Breslau (Wrocław)
German royalty
Catholic Church titles
Regnal titles
Preceded by Karl von Liechtenstein	Prince-Bishop of Breslau; 1683–1732	Succeeded by Philipp Ludwig von Sinzendorf
Preceded by Ludwig Anton von Pfalz-Neuburg	Grand Master of the Teutonic Order; 1694–1732	Succeeded by Clemens August of Bavaria
Preceded by Ludwig Anton von Pfalz-Neuburg	Prince-Bishop of Worms; 1694–1732	Succeeded by Franz Georg von Schönborn-Buchheim
Preceded by Ludwig Anton von Pfalz-Neuburg	Prince-Provost of Ellwangen; 1694–1732	Succeeded by Franz Georg von Schönborn-Buchheim
Preceded by Charles Joseph of Lorraine	Archbishop-Elector of Trier and Prince-Abbot of Prüm; 1716–1729	Succeeded by Franz Georg von Schönborn-Buchheim
Preceded by Lothar Franz von Schönborn	Archbishop-Elector of Mainz; 1729–1732	Succeeded by Philipp Karl von Eltz-Kempenich
