= Ludwig Anton von Pfalz-Neuburg =

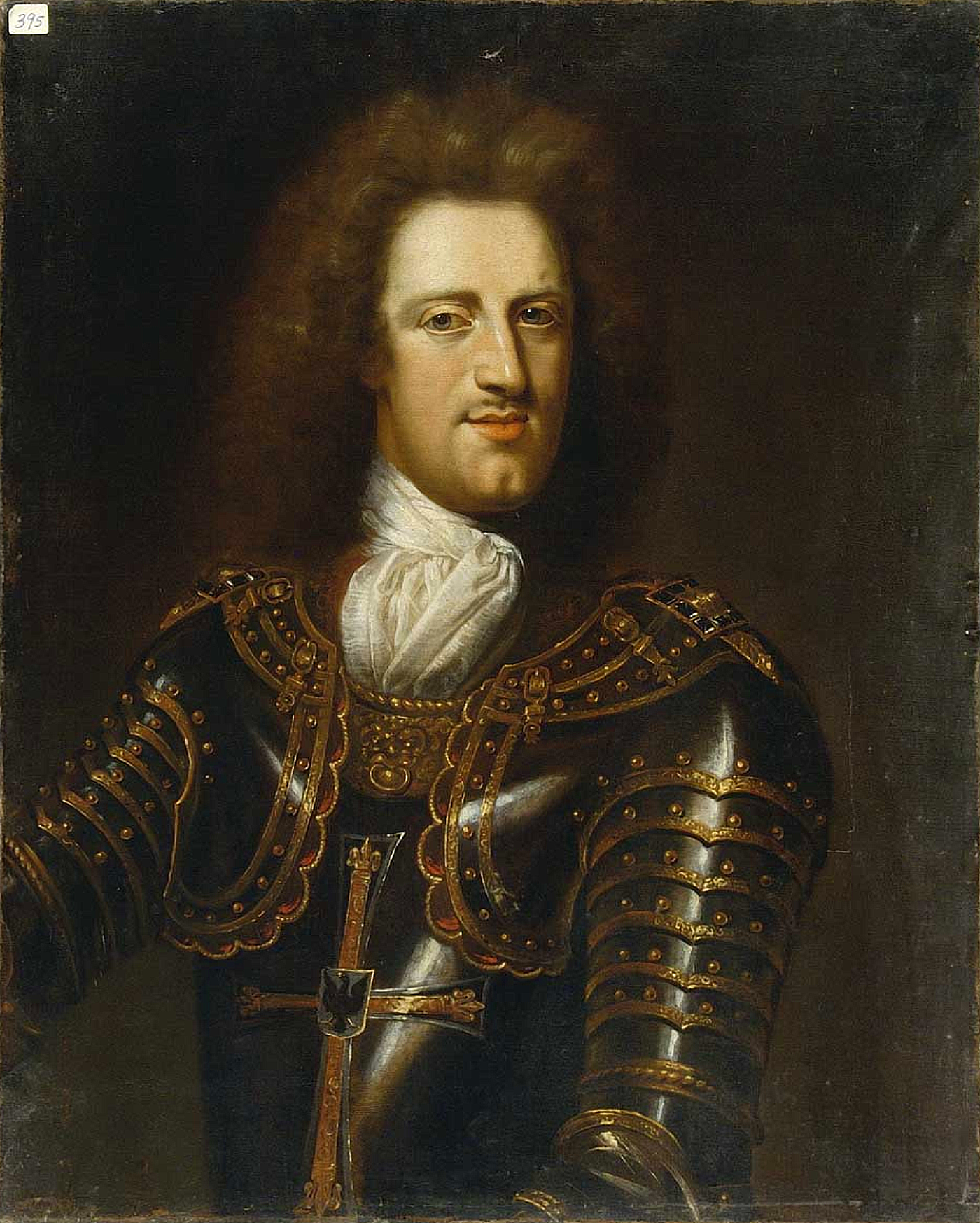
Portrait by Jan Frans van Douven, c. 1690–1699

Ludwig Anton von Pfalz-Neuburg (9 June 1660 – 4 May 1694), also known as Ludwig Anton von Rhein zu Neuburg, served as Grand Master of the Teutonic Knights from 1685 and as the Prince-Bishop of Worms from 1691 until his death in 1694.

== Biography ==
A member of the House of Wittelsbach, Ludwig Anton von Pfalz-Neuburg was born in Düsseldorf on 9 June 1660. His father, Philip Wilhelm was at the time Count Palatine of Pfalz-Neuburg and would become Elector Palatine in 1685. His mother was Landgravine Elisabeth Amalie of Hesse-Darmstadt.

As a younger son, Ludwig Anton was groomed for a career in the church from an early age. He was made a canon of Cologne Cathedral (1664), Mainz Cathedral (1668), Strasbourg Cathedral (1669), Speyer Cathedral (1674), and Liège Cathedral (1679). He was also the abbot of Fécamp Abbey from 1674.

He was inducted into the Teutonic Knights on 10 December 1679 and chosen as the coadjutor of the Grand Master six days later. He took part in the 1683 Battle of Vienna and was decorated by Leopold I, Holy Roman Emperor for his bravery. He succeeded as Grand Master of the Teutonic Knights on 6 September 1684. He subsequently participated in the Battle of Buda (1686), where he was seriously injured.

In 1688, Louis XIV of France succeeded in having the cathedral chapter of Cologne Cathedral elect his client Wilhelm Egon von Fürstenberg to be coadjutor archbishop of Cologne, meaning he would succeed as Archbishop of Cologne upon the death of Maximilian Henry of Bavaria. However, Leopold I prevailed on Pope Innocent XI to veto the appointment, with the pope having Sebastiano Antonio Tanara, the Apostolic Nuncio to Cologne, ensure that the cathedral chapter changed its vote. Ludwig Anton and his brother Count Palatine Francis Louis of Neuburg, who was also a member of the cathedral chapter, subsequently ensured that Louis XIV's candidate could not receive the required two-thirds majority and Joseph Clemens of Bavaria was eventually elected instead.

During the Nine Years' War, Ludwig Anton was a commander during the Siege of Mainz, in the course of which he was shot on 4 August 1689.

On 22 August 1689 he was elected to be the assistant of the Prince-Provost of Ellwangen Abbey. He was selected coadjutor archbishop of Mainz on 19 April 1691, with Pope Innocent XII confirming his appointment on 12 November 1691.

On 12 November 1691 the cathedral chapter of Worms Cathedral elected him to be the new Prince-Bishop of Worms, which had been decimated by the fighting of the Nine Years' War and sought an outsider to help restore the prince-bishopric's fortunes. Innocent XII confirmed his appointment on 9 June 1693. He was ordained as a priest by Anselm Franz von Ingelheim, Archbishop-Elector of Mainz in the Jesuit church in Aschaffenburg on 4 January 1694.

Later in 1694, he was a candidate to become Prince-Bishop of Liège, along with Joseph Clemens of Bavaria. He died in Liège on 4 May 1694 before the election was finalized.

== Ancestry ==
Ancestors of Ludwig Anton von Pfalz-Neuburg

16. Wolfgang, Count Palatine of Zweibrücken
8. Philip Louis, Count Palatine of Neuburg
17. Landgravine Anna of Hesse
4. Wolfgang Wilhelm, Count Palatine of Neuburg
18. William, Duke of Jülich-Cleves-Berg
9. Anna of Cleves
19. Archduchess Maria of Austria
2. Philipp Wilhelm, Elector Palatine
20. Albert V, Duke of Bavaria
10. William V, Duke of Bavaria
21. Archduchess Anna of Austria
5. Duchess Magdalene of Bavaria
22. Francis I, Duke of Lorraine
11. Duchess Renata of Lorraine
23. Princess Christina of Denmark and Norway
1. Ludwig Anton von Pfalz-Neuburg
24. George I, Landgrave of Hesse-Darmstadt
12. Louis V, Landgrave of Hesse-Darmstadt
25. Countess Magdalene of Lippe
6. George II, Landgrave of Hesse-Darmstadt
26. John George, Elector of Brandenburg
13. Margravine Magdalena of Brandenburg
27. Princess Elisabeth of Anhalt-Zerbst
3. Landgravine Elisabeth Amalie of Hesse-Darmstadt
28. Christian I, Elector of Saxony
14. John George I, Elector of Saxony
29. Margravine Sophie of Brandenburg
7. Princess Sophia Eleonore of Saxony
30. Albert Frederick, Duke of Prussia
15. Duchess Magdalene Sibylle of Prussia
31. Duchess Marie Eleonore of Cleves

Catholic Church titles
| Preceded by Johann Caspar von Ampringen | Grand Master of the Teutonic Knights; 1685–1694 | Succeeded by Francis Louis of Palatinate-Neuburg |
| Preceded by Johannes Karl von und zu Franckenstein | Prince-Bishop of Worms; 1691–1694 | Succeeded by Francis Louis of Palatinate-Neuburg |
