= Alexander Sigismund von der Pfalz-Neuburg =

Prince-Bishop of Augsburg from 1690 to 1737

- Prince-Bishop of Augsburg
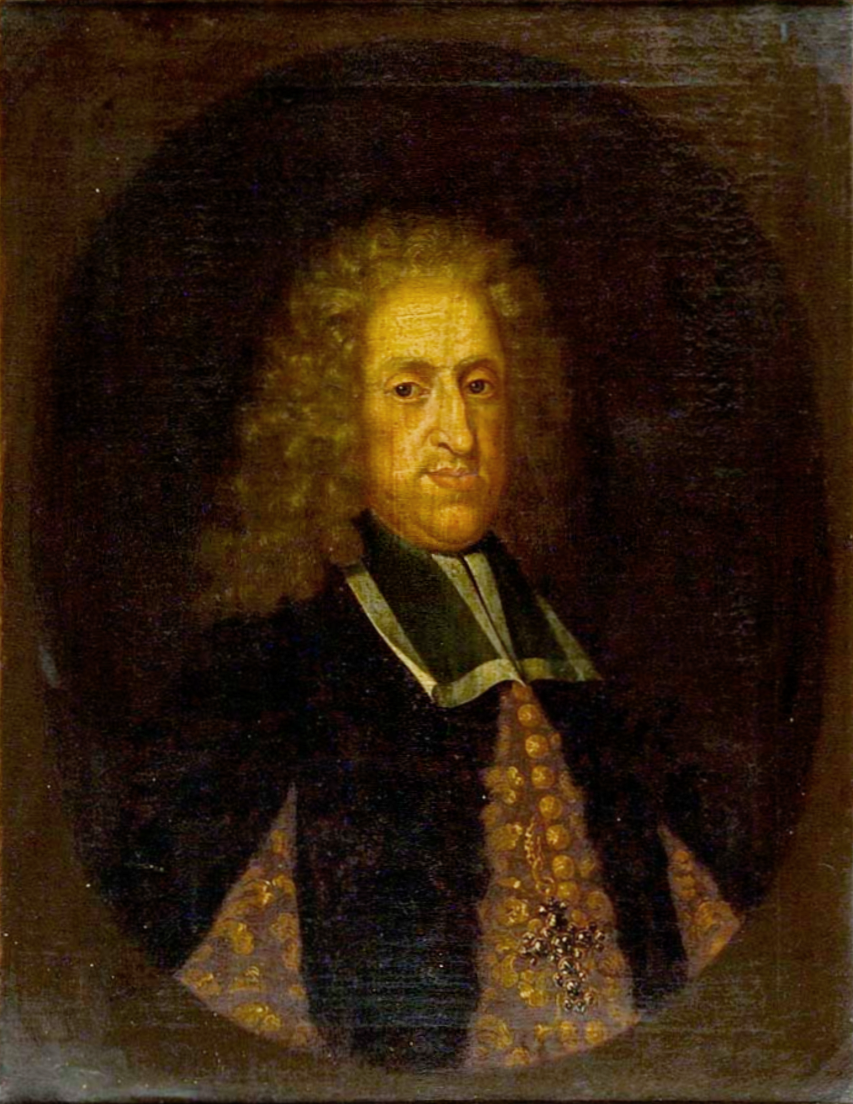
- 18th century portrait
- Diocese: Augsburg
- In office: 31 May 1690 – 24 January 1737
- Predecessor: Johann Christoph von Freyberg-Allmendingen
- Successor: Johann Franz Schenk von Stauffenberg

Personal details
- Born: 16 April 1663 Neuburg an der Donau
- Died: 24 January 1737 (aged 73) Augsburg
- Denomination: Roman Catholic

Alexander Sigismund von der Pfalz-Neuburg (16 April 1663 – 24 January 1737) was the Prince-Bishop of Augsburg from 1690 to 1737.

== Biography ==
A member of the House of Wittelsbach, Alexander Sigismund von der Pfalz-Neuburg was born in Neuburg an der Donau on 16 April 1663, the fifth son of Philip William, Elector Palatine and his wife Landgravine Elisabeth Amalie of Hesse-Darmstadt. (At the time Alexander Sigismund was born, his father was Herzog of Palatinate-Neuburg; his father became Elector Palatine in 1685). He was destined for the clergy from a young age, and was sent to study with the Jesuits in Neuburg an der Donau and Düsseldorf.

He was appointed coadjutor bishop of Augsburg on 10 February 1681. He suffered a serious riding accident in 1688. He was ordained as a priest on 26 July 1689.

Johann Christoph von Freyberg-Allmendingen died on 1 April 1690 and Alexander Sigismund succeeded him as Prince-Bishop of Augsburg, with Pope Alexander VIII confirming his appointment on 31 May 1690. He was consecrated as a bishop by Marquard Rudolf von Rodt, Bishop of Constance, on 18 June 1690.

In 1714, Alexander Sigismund suffered a bout of mental illness, and the cathedral chapter of Augsburg Cathedral selected Johann Franz Schenk von Stauffenberg, Bishop of Constance, to be coadjutor bishop on 11 June 1714. Alexander Sigismund finally recovered enough to resume his duties as Prince-Bishop in 1718.

He died in Augsburg on 24 January 1737.

== Ancestry ==
Ancestors of Alexander Sigismund von der Pfalz-Neuburg

16. Wolfgang, Count Palatine of Zweibrücken
8. Philip Louis, Count Palatine of Neuburg
17. Landgravine Anna of Hesse
4. Wolfgang Wilhelm, Count Palatine of Neuburg
18. William, Duke of Jülich-Cleves-Berg
9. Anna of Cleves
19. Archduchess Maria of Austria
2. Philipp Wilhelm, Elector Palatine
20. Albert V, Duke of Bavaria
10. William V, Duke of Bavaria
21. Archduchess Anna of Austria
5. Duchess Magdalene of Bavaria
22. Francis I, Duke of Lorraine
11. Duchess Renata of Lorraine
23. Princess Christina of Denmark and Norway
1. Alexander Sigismund von der Pfalz-Neuburg
24. George I, Landgrave of Hesse-Darmstadt
12. Louis V, Landgrave of Hesse-Darmstadt
25. Countess Magdalene of Lippe
6. George II, Landgrave of Hesse-Darmstadt
26. John George, Elector of Brandenburg
13. Margravine Magdalena of Brandenburg
27. Princess Elisabeth of Anhalt-Zerbst
3. Landgravine Elisabeth Amalie of Hesse-Darmstadt
28. Christian I, Elector of Saxony
14. John George I, Elector of Saxony
29. Margravine Sophie of Brandenburg
7. Princess Sophia Eleonore of Saxony
30. Albert Frederick, Duke of Prussia
15. Duchess Magdalene Sibylle of Prussia
31. Duchess Marie Eleonore of Cleves

== Notes and references ==
Catholic Church titles
Preceded by Johann Christoph von Freyberg-Allmendingen	Prince-Bishop of Augsburg; 1690 – 1737	Succeeded by Johann Franz Schenk von Stauffenberg
