= Maria Anna of Neuburg =

Queen of Spain from 1689 to 1700

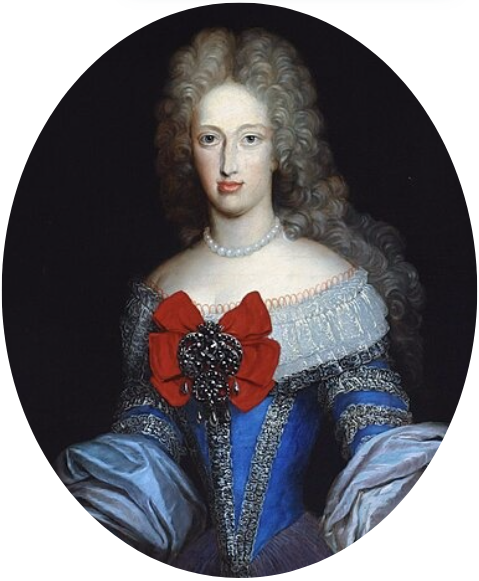
- Portrait by Wilhelm Humer

Queen consort of Spain
- Tenure: 28 August 1689 – 1 November 1700
- Born: 28 October 1667; Benrath Palace, Düsseldorf, Electoral Palatinate
- Died: 16 July 1740 (aged 72); Infantado Palace, Guadalajara, Spain
- Burial: El Escorial, Spain
- Spouse: Charles II of Spain (m. 1689; died 1700)
- House: Wittelsbach
- Father: Philip William, Elector Palatine
- Mother: Elisabeth Amalie of Hesse-Darmstadt

Maria Anna of Neuburg (Note: Spanish: Mariana) (28 October 1667 – 16 July 1740), was a German princess and member of the Wittelsbach family. In 1689, she became Queen of Spain as the second wife of Charles II of Spain, last Habsburg ruler of the Spanish Empire.

Since Charles never had children, her reign was dominated by the struggle between French and Austrian factions over the Spanish throne. When Charles died in 1700, he was succeeded by Philip of Anjou, grandson of Louis XIV of France, leading to the War of the Spanish Succession (1701-1714). A firm supporter of the Austrian candidate, Maria Anna was exiled and lived in obscurity until her death in 1740.

== Background and marriage ==
Born 28 October 1667 at Benrath Palace near Düsseldorf, Maria Anna was the twelfth child of Philip William, ruler of the duchies of Berg and Jülich, and his wife, Elisabeth Amalie of Hesse-Darmstadt. A family reputation for fertility and their Wittelsbach connections made the daughters a popular choice for royal marriages. Of her sisters, Maria Sophia married Peter II of Portugal, and Eleonore became the third wife of Emperor Leopold I. Maria Anna was thus aunt to the future emperors Joseph I and Charles VI.

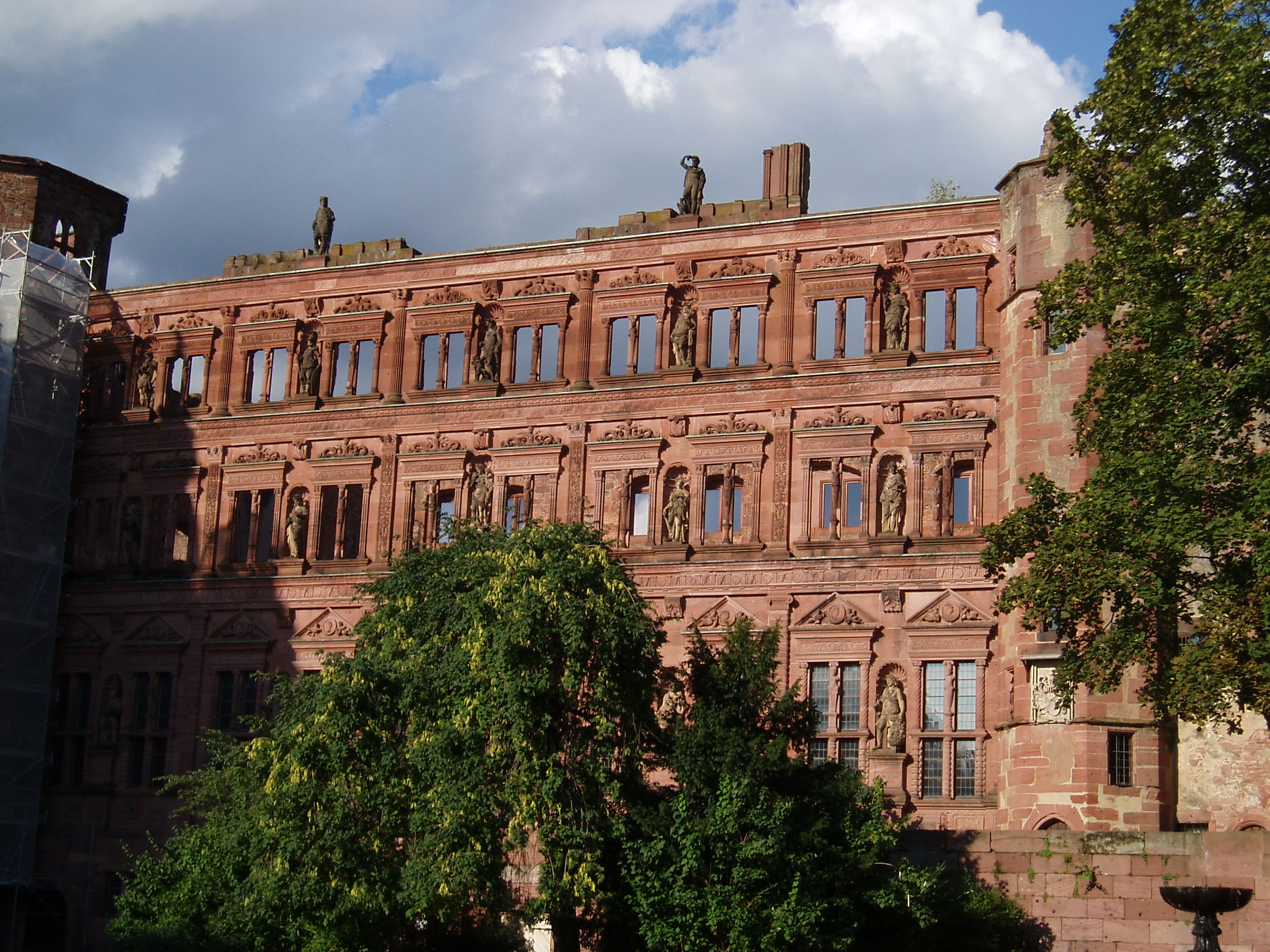
Heidelberg Castle, destroyed by the French in 1689 and never rebuilt; its destruction confirmed Maria Anna's anti-French opinions

When Philip William succeeded Charles of Simmern as Count of the Palatinate in May 1685, Louis XIV claimed half of it. The French invaded in September 1688 and, before withdrawing in 1689, destroyed much of Heidelberg and another 20 substantial towns and numerous villages. Although the policy was applied across the Rhineland, the Palatinate was raided again in 1693, and the devastation shocked much of Europe.

It confirmed Maria Anna's pro-Austrian, anti-French sentiments, which were important factors in her selection as the second wife of Charles II of Spain. His first wife, Marie Louise d'Orléans died on 12 February 1689; lack of an heir and concerns over his health meant his remarriage became a matter of urgency. His mother and Queen Regent, Mariana of Austria, selected Maria Anna on the basis of her family's history of fertility and their opposition to France. She underwent a proxy marriage to Charles in August 1689, with their formal wedding on 14 May 1690 in San Diego, near Valladolid. Their marriage is commemorated in the Festival book, listing celebrations held in Naples to mark the occasion. (Note: Its full title being L’ossequio tributario della fedelissima Città di Napoli, per le dimostranze giulive nei Regii Sponsali del Cattolico, ed Invittissimo Monarca Carlo Secondo colla Serenissima Principessa Maria Anna di Neoburgo Palatina del Reno.)

== Queen of Spain ==
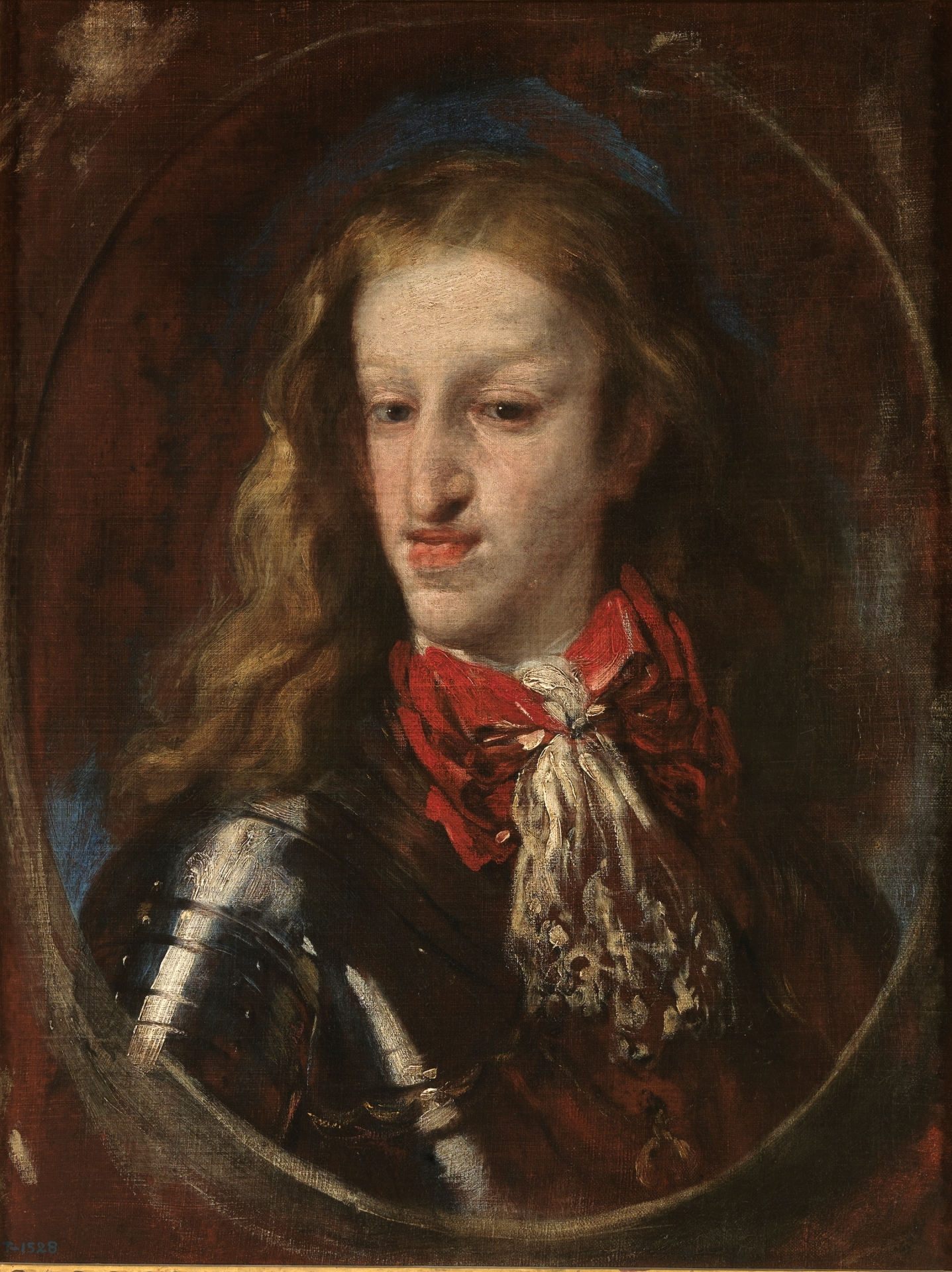
Charles II, ca 1670-80

The Spanish political establishment was split into pro-Austrian and pro-French factions, the latter led by Fernández de Portocarrero, Cardinal and Archbishop of Toledo. For most of this period, the 'Austrians' controlled government, with Maria Anna assuming leadership after Mariana of Austria died in 1696. In 1690, they supported Spain's entry into the Nine Years War, which proved a disastrous decision; the state declared bankruptcy in 1692 and by 1696, France occupied most of Catalonia.

Maria Anna's power derived from her status as mother of the future monarch, which dissipated when it became clear this was unlikely to occur. By now, Charles was almost certainly impotent, his autopsy later revealing he had only one atrophied testicle. To offset this, she claimed to be pregnant on various occasions, and encouraged Charles to undergo treatments to increase his fertility, thus making it clear the failure to produce an heir was not her fault.

In 1698, Charles fell seriously ill and his death seemed imminent. On 11 October, Britain, France and the Dutch Republic signed the Treaty of the Hague or First Partition Treaty, an attempt to impose a solution to the Succession issue on Spain and Austria. Six year old Joseph Ferdinand of Bavaria was made heir to the bulk of the Spanish Empire, the rest split between France and Austria. His parents were Charles's niece Maria Antonia and Maximilian II Emanuel of Bavaria, a Wittelsbach like Maria Anna. The Spanish were not consulted on the partition of their Empire and unsurprisingly opposed such a solution. On 14 November 1698, Charles published his Will, naming Joseph Ferdinand his successor but stipulating he would inherit an undivided Spanish Monarchy. It also appointed Maria Anna regent during his minority, an announcement reportedly received by his Spanish councillors in silence.

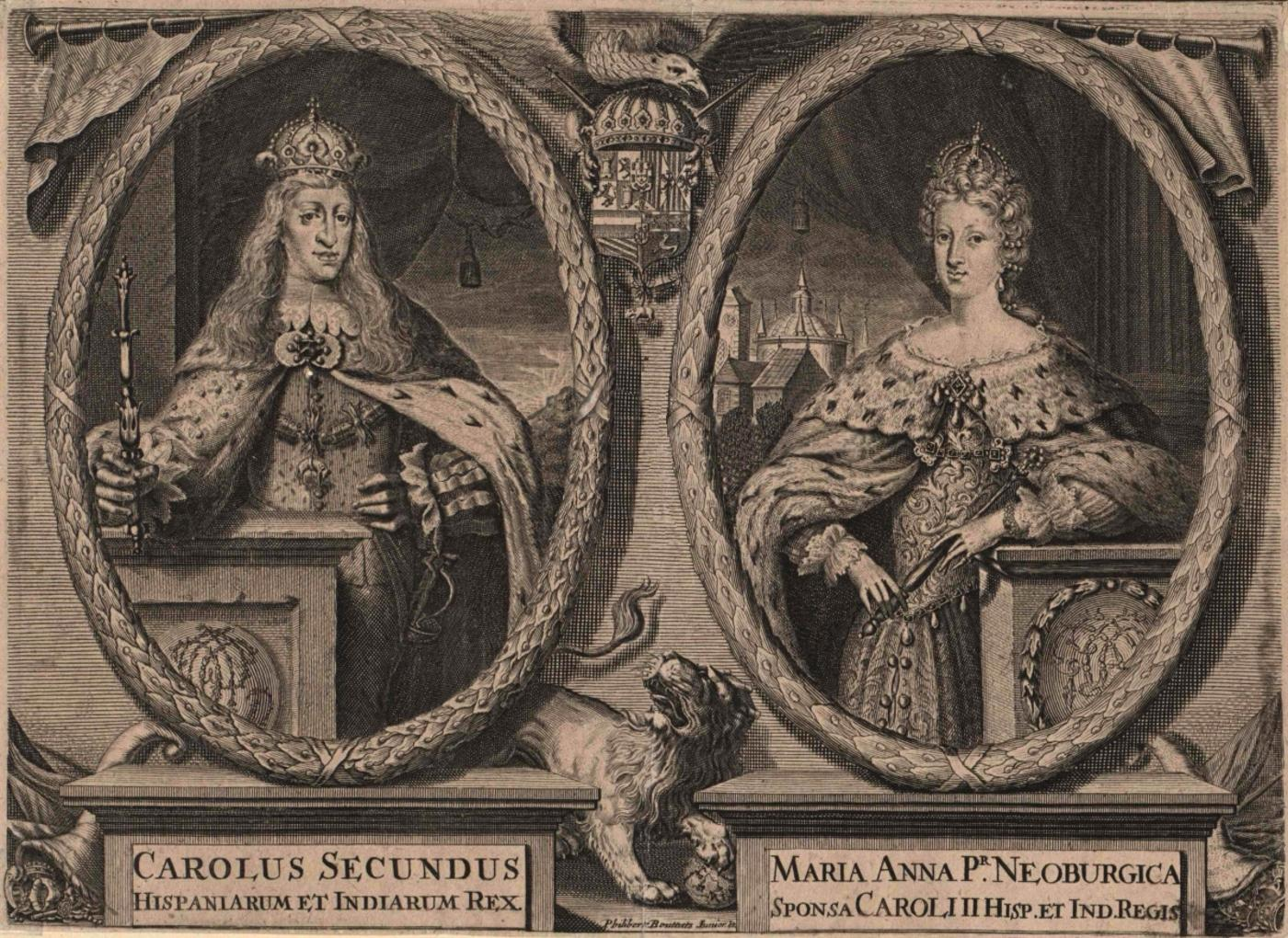
Charles II and Maria Anna of Neuburg, by an unknown artist

After Joseph Ferdinand died suddenly in 1699, France, Britain and the Dutch Republic agreed to the Second Partition Treaty in March 1700. Joseph Ferdinand was replaced by Maria Anna's nephew, Archduke Charles, with Spanish possessions in Italy, the Netherlands and Northern Spain divided between France, Savoy and Austria. Charles modified his Will in favour of Archduke Charles, but continued to insist on an undivided Monarchy and added the requirement Spain remain independent of Austria.

Most of the Castilian nobility preferred a Bourbon candidate, despite efforts by Maria Anna to ensure her nephew's succession. In June 1700, her ally Mendoza, Inquisitor General, arrested Charles's pro-French personal confessor Froilán Díaz, and charged him with 'bewitching' the king. When the committee set up to review the case acquitted Díaz, Mendoza ordered their arrest, seriously undermining Maria Anna, who was viewed as the instigator. A Council was established to investigate the Inquisition itself; it survived as an institution until 1834, but its power was broken.

== Queen dowager of Spain ==
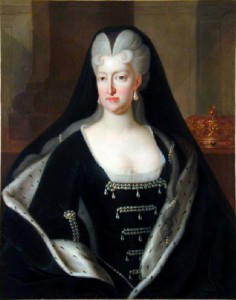
Maria Anna as a widow, c. 1726

Charles fell ill once again in late 1700 and by 28 September he was no longer able to eat and Portocarrero persuaded him to alter his will in favour of Louis XIV's grandson, Philip of Anjou. His death on 1 November was followed by Philip's proclamation as King of Spain on 16th, with Portocarrero as his chief advisor. Maria Anna was exiled to Toledo, where she lived quietly until 1706, when the forces of her nephew Archduke Charles briefly occupied the city. Philip later exiled her to Bayonne in France, where she lived for the next few decades and allegedly married a local barrel-maker. In 1739, she was allowed to return to Spain and given lodging in the Palacio del Infantado, Guadalajara. She died on 16 July 1740, and was buried in El Escorial Monastery.

== Heraldry ==
Heraldry of Maria Anna of Neuburg

(1689–1700)

Coat of arms as Queen Dowager
(1700–1740)

== Ancestry ==
Ancestors of Maria Anna of Neuburg

8. Philip Louis, Count Palatine of Neuburg
4. Wolfgang William, Count Palatine of Neuburg
9. Anna of Cleves
2. Philip William, Elector Palatine
10. William V, Duke of Bavaria
5. Magdalene of Bavaria
11. Renata of Lorraine
1. Maria Anna of Neuburg
12. Louis V, Landgrave of Hesse-Darmstadt
6. George II, Landgrave of Hesse-Darmstadt
13. Magdalena of Brandenburg
3. Elisabeth Amalie of Hesse-Darmstadt
14. John George I, Elector of Saxony
7. Sophie Eleonore of Saxony
15. Magdalena Sibylle of Prussia

== Sources ==
- Beem, Charles (2019). Queenship in Early Modern Europe. Red Globe Press. ISBN 978-1137005083.
- Clark, George (1970). Bromley, JS (ed.). From the Nine Years War to the war of the Spanish Succession in The New Cambridge Modern History Volume VI. Cambridge University Press. ISBN 978-0521075244.
- Dosquet, Emilie (2016). The Desolation of the Palatinate as a European News Event in News Networks in Early Modern Europe. Brill. ISBN 978-9004277175. JSTOR 10.1163/j.ctt1w8h1ng.35.
- Durant, Ariel; Durant, Will (1963). Age of Louis XIV (Story of Civilization). TBS Publishing. ISBN 0207942277.
- García-Escudero López, Ángel; Arruza Echevarría, A; Padilla Nieva, Jaime; Puig Giró, Ramon (2009). "Charles II; from spell to genitourinary pathology". History of Urology. 62 (3).
- Hargreaves-Mawdsley, HN (1979). Eighteenth-Century Spain 1700-1788: A Political, Diplomatic and Institutional History. Macmillan. ISBN 978-0333146125.
- Hume, Martin Andrew Sharp (1906). Queens of Old Spain. McClure, Philips & Company.
- Kamen, Henry (1997). The Spanish Inquisition: An Historical Revision. Weidenfeld & Nicolson. ISBN 978-0297817192.
- Lo, Ruth. "Festival Book as Political Propaganda: The Long Celebrations for a Marriage in Naples". Brown University.
- Lynn, John (1999). The Wars of Louis XIV, 1667–1714 (Modern Wars in Perspective). Longman. ISBN 978-0582056299.
- Mckay, Derek; Scott, HM (1983). The Rise of the Great Powers 1648 - 1815 (The Modern European State System). Routledge. ISBN 978-0582485549.
- Onnekink, David (2007). The Anglo-Dutch Favourite: The Career of Hans Willem Bentinck, 1st Earl of Portland (1649–1709). Routledge. ISBN 978-1138259317.
- Rommelse, Gijs (2011). Ideology and Foreign Policy in Early Modern Europe (1650–1750). Routledge. ISBN 978-1409419136.
- Rule, John (2017). Onnekink, David; Mijers, Esther (eds.). The Partition Treaties, 1698-1700; A European View in Redefining William III: The Impact of the King-Stadholder in International Context. Routledge. ISBN 978-1138257962.
- Storrs, Christopher (2006). The Resilience of the Spanish Monarchy 1665-1700. OUP Oxford. ISBN 0199246378.
- Ward, William; Leathes, Stanley (1912). The Cambridge Modern History (2010 ed.). Nabu. ISBN 978-1174382055.

Maria Anna of Neuburg House of Wittelsbach Born: 28 October 1667 Died: 16 July 1740
Spanish royalty
Vacant Title last held by Marie Louise d'Orléans	Queen consort of Spain; 1690– 1700	Vacant Title next held by Maria Luisa of Savoy
