= Countess Palatine Leopoldine Eleonore of Neuburg =

German princess (1679–1693)

Leopoldine Eleonore of Neuburg
- Countess Palatine Leopoldine Eleonore of Neuburg
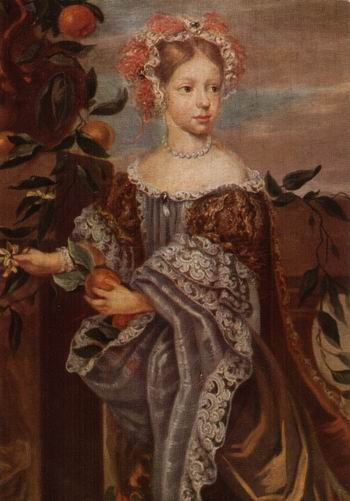
- Portrait by an unknown artist
- Born: 27 May 1679; Neuburg an der Donau
- Died: 8 March 1693 (aged 13); Düsseldorf
- Burial: Church of Saint Andreas
Names
- Leopoldine Eleonore Josepha
- House: Wittelsbach
- Father: Philip William, Elector Palatine
- Mother: Elisabeth Amalie of Hesse-Darmstadt

Leopoldine Eleonore of Neuburg (Leopoldine Eleonore Josepha; 27 May 1679 – 8 March 1693) was a German princess who was a Countess Palatine of Neuburg and member of the Neuburg branch House of Wittelsbach by birth. She was also a Princess of the Palatinate while her father ruled as Elector Palatine.

Born in Neuburg an der Donau, she was the youngest of seventeen children of Philip William, Duke of Neuburg, Berg and Jülich, Elector Palatine of Neuburg and his wife Elisabeth Amalie of Hesse-Darmstadt.

== Life ==
Leopoldine's oldest sister, Eleonore Magdalene, became the Holy Roman Empress in 1676, as the third wife of Leopold I; this helped her numerous siblings to secure brilliant careers and marriages. After her father's death in 1690, Leopoldine was under the legal guardianship of her older brother Johann Wilhelm, who also supervised her education. In addition to language, religion, and handicrafts, the young princess learned music from the Kapellmeister Sebastiano Moratelli.

In the summer of 1691, Leopoldine became ill after a difficult trip from Neuburg to Düsseldorf. It was there that, thanks to the care and affection of her sister-in-law, Anna Maria Luisa de' Medici, her condition improved.

In March 1693, she was formally betrothed to Maximilian II Emanuel, Elector of Bavaria, whose first wife, Maria Antonia of Austria, had died in December 1692. However, shortly after, in 1693, Leopoldine died in Düsseldorf, aged 13, after seven days of fever.

She was buried in the Church of St. Andreas in Düsseldorf; however, her heart was placed in the Electoral crypt of Neuburg, and with the heart of her brother Philip William August (who died just one month later, on 5 April), were later placed in the coffin of their mother when she died in 1709.

Today, Leopoldine's coffin is in the Mausoleum of St. Andreas. In 2007, the coffin was opened for decontamination. It was noted that the mummified remains of the princess were buried in silk stockings.

== Bibliography ==
- Mooren; Eckertz; Ennen (1861). Annalen des Historischen Vereins für den Niederrhein, insbesondere die alte Erzdiözese Köln (in German).
- Prümm, Gustav (2009). Ein Gewinn fürs ganze Leben (in German).
- Linda Maria Koldau: Frauen-Musik-Kultur: ein Handbuch zum deutschen Sprachgebiet der Frühen Neuzeit, Böhlau Verlag Köln Weimar, 2005, p. 181.
