= Princess Elisabeth Amalie of Hesse-Darmstadt =

Elisabeth Amalie of Hesse-Darmstadt
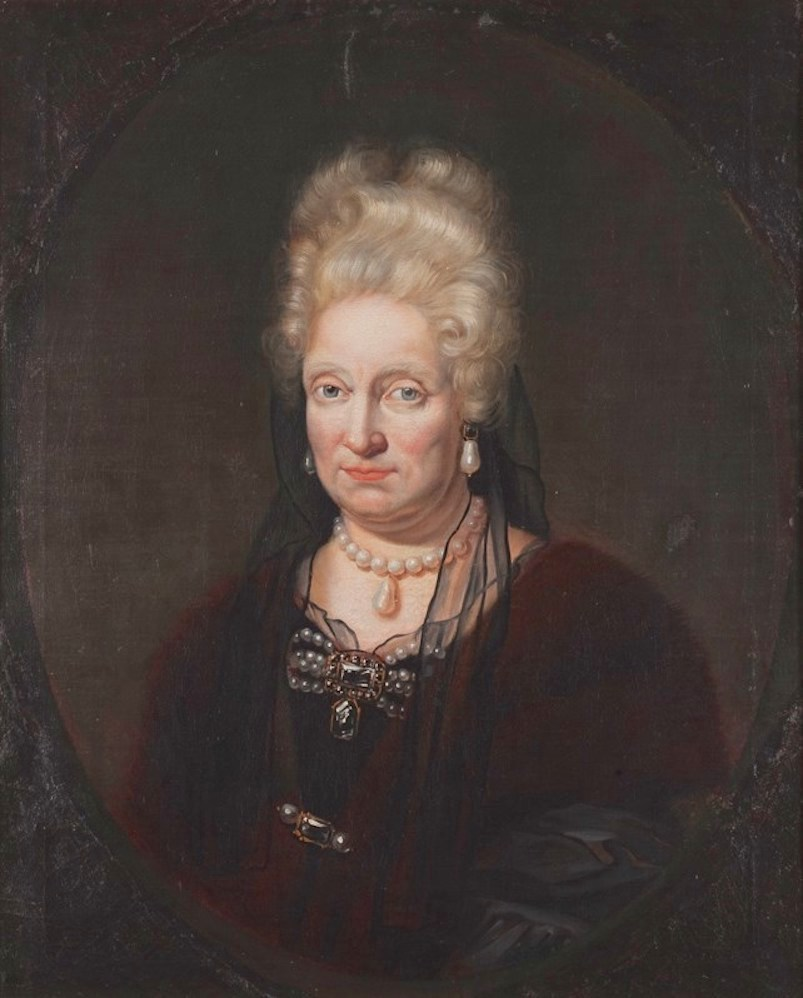
- Portrait, c. 1705

Electress Palatine
- Tenure: 26 May 1685 – 2 September 1690
- Born: 20 March 1635; New Palace, Gießen, Germany
- Died: 4 August 1709 (aged 74); Neuburg Palace, Neuburg, Germany
- Burial: Neuburg an der Donau, Germany
- Spouse: Philip William, Elector Palatine (m. 1653; died 1690)
- Issue Detail: Eleonor Magdalene, Holy Roman Empress; John William, Elector Palatine; Wolfgang George Frederick von Pfalz-Neuburg; Ludwig Anton von Pfalz-Neuburg; Charles III Philip, Elector Palatine; Alexander Sigismund, Bishop of Augsburg; Francis Louis, Archbishop of Trier; Frederick Wilhelm von Pfalz-Neuburg; Maria Sophia, Queen of Portugal; Maria Anna, Queen of Spain; Philip William August of Neuburg; Dorothea Sophie, Duchess of Parma; Hedwig Elisabeth, Princess Sobieski; Countess Palatine Leopoldine Eleonora of Neuburg
Names
- German: Elisabeth Amalie Magdalene von Hessen-Darmstadt; English: Elizabeth Amelia Magdalena of Hesse-Darmstadt
- House: Hesse-Darmstadt
- Father: George II, Landgrave of Hesse-Darmstadt
- Mother: Sophia Eleonore of Saxony

Landgravine Elisabeth Amalie Magdalene of Hesse-Darmstadt (20 March 1635 – 4 August 1709) was a German princess of Hesse-Darmstadt who became Electress Palatine as the second wife of Philip William, Elector Palatine.

== Biography ==
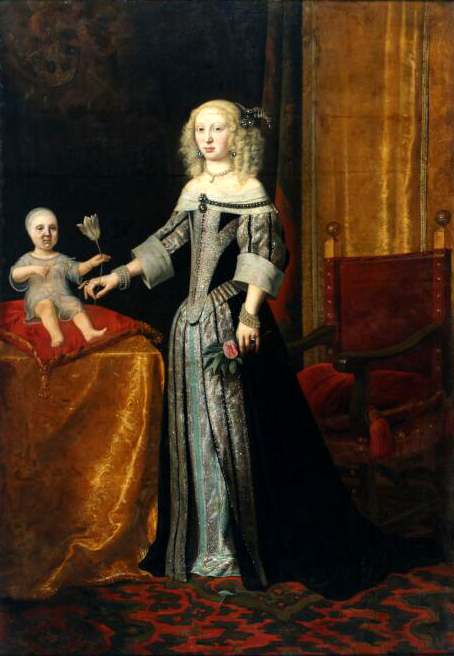
Elisabeth Amalie, probably with her eldest daughter Eleonor Magdalene, around 1655.

Born in 1635 at the New Palace in Gießen, Elisabeth Amalie was the daughter of George II, Landgrave of Hesse-Darmstadt and Sophia Eleonore of Saxony. Her siblings included Louis of Hesse-Darmstadt, future Landgrave of Hesse-Darmstadt and Anna Sophia, Abbess of Quedlinburg.

Elisabeth Amalie was brought up strictly by her mother, who was a devout Lutheran. She had an attractive appearance with striking blond hair, a trait she kept until her old age and which was inherited by her daughters Eleonor Magdalene and Dorothea Sophie, the latter being known in particular for her blonde hair.

On 3 September 1653 she was married at Langenschwalbach to Count palatine Philip William of Neuburg, who later became Prince-elector of the Palatinate. Her husband was some twenty years older than her and was the heir to the Electoral Palatinate, which was one of the most important states within the Holy Roman Empire.

The events surrounding the wedding ceremony between Elisabeth and Philip Willam are recorded as follows:

[Philip William hurried to Schwalbach] primarily to prevent his bride from having to communicate in Lutheran language before the wedding, or, with great annoyance, declare herself to her princely parents, whose mother was a staunch Saxon Lutheran, before the time of her conversion.

She converted to Catholicism on 1 November 1653 in the presence of the elector and archbishop of Cologne, Maximilian Henry of Bavaria.

The writer William Nakatenus dedicated his work The Heavenly Palm little garden to her.

== Issue ==
She and Philip William had at least sixteen children.

Issue

Name	Portrait	Lifespan	Notes
Eleonor Magdalene; Holy Roman Empress		6 January 1655- 19 January 1720	Married in 1676 Leopold I, Holy Roman Emperor and had issue;
Maria Adelheid Anna		6 January 1656- 22 December 1656	Died in infancy
Sophia Elisabeth		25 May 1657- 7 February 1658	Died in infancy
Johann Wilhelm; Elector Palatine		19 April 1658- 8 June 1716	Married first Archduchess Maria Anna Josepha of Austria and had no surviving issue; married second Anna Maria Luisa de' Medici and had no issue
Wolfgang George Frederik; Auxiliary Bishop in Köln		5 June 1659- 4 June 1683	Died unmarried
Ludwig Anton; Bishop of Worms		9 June 1660- 4 May 1694	Died unmarried
Charles III Philip; Elector Palatine		4 November 1661- 31 December 1742	Married first Ludwika Karolina Radziwiłł and had issue; married second Teresa Lubomirska and had issue; married third Violante Theresia of Thurn and Taxis, no issue
Alexander Sigismund; Bishop of Augsburg		16 April 1663- 24 January 1737	Died unmarried
Francis Louis; Archbishop of Wrocław		18 July 1664- 6 April 1732	Died unmarried
Frederik Wilhelm; Imperial General		20 July 1665- 23 July 1689	Died unmarried
Maria Sophia Elisabeth; Queen of Portugal		6 August 1666- 4 August 1699	Married in 1687 Peter II of Portugal and had issue
Maria Anna; Queen of Spain		28 October 1667- 16 July 1740	Married in 1690 Charles II of Spain, no issue;
Philip William August		19 November 1668- 5 April 1693	Married in 1690 Anna Maria Franziska of Saxe-Lauenburg and had issue
Dorothea Sophie; Duchess of Parma		5 July 1670- 15 September 1748	Married in 1690 Odoardo Farnese and had issue;
Hedwig Elisabeth Amelia; Princess Sobieski		18 July 1673- 10 August 1722	Married in 1691 James Louis Sobieski and had issue;
Johann		1 February 1675- 2 February 1675	Died in infancy
Leopoldine Eleonora Josepha		27 May 1679 - 8 March 1693	Died unmarried

Royal titles
Preceded by Wilhelmina Ernestine of Denmark	Electress Palatine; 1685–1690	Succeeded by Anna Maria Luisa de' Medici
