= Johann Caspar von Ampringen =

- Grand Master of the Teutonic Knights; Governor of Hungary
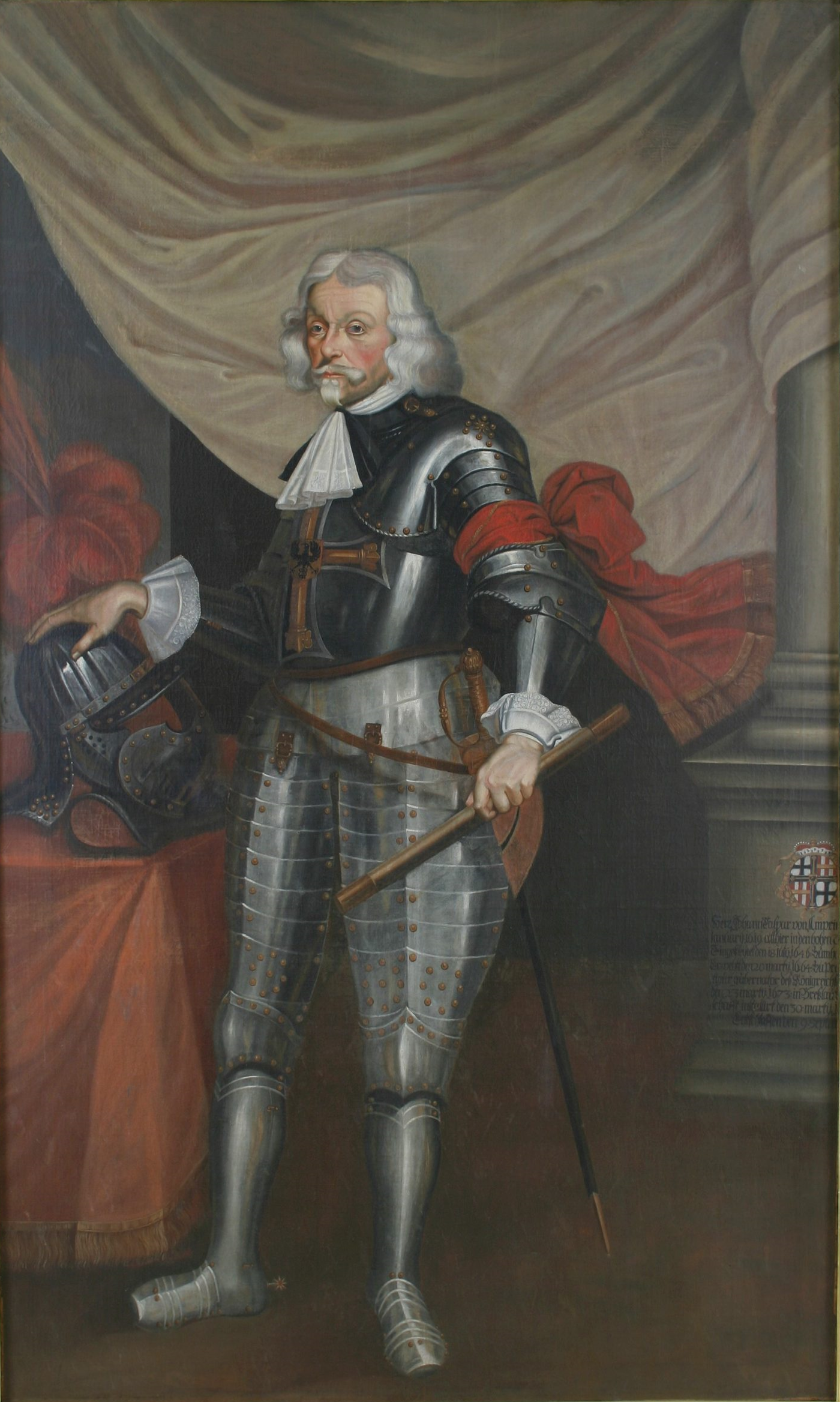

Grand Master of the Teutonic Knights
- Reign: 1664–1684
- Predecessor: Charles Joseph
- Successor: Ludwig Anton von Pfalz-Neuburg
- Born: 1619
- Died: 1684; Breslau
- Religion: Roman Catholic

Johann Caspar von Ampringen (19 January 1619 – 9 September 1684) was the 48th Grand Master of the Teutonic Order, serving from 27 January 1664 until his death.

== Life and career ==
Von Ampringen was born in Hungary to a noble family from Baden-Württemberg; his father was Johann Christoph von Ampringen, his mother Susanne von Landsberg. In 1646, he joined the Teutonic Order, then gradually advanced through the ranks. From 1660, he was entrusted with the protection of the Croatian border, part of a series of defensive positions called the Military Frontier, from incursions by the Ottoman Empire on behalf of the order. After the death of Archduke Charles Joseph of Austria in 1664, he was unanimously elected Grand Master of the Order of Knights. That same year, he led a contingent of the Teutonic Knights in the successful Battle of Saint Gotthard against the Ottoman armies, an important victory for the Christian coalition forces which halted Turkish expansion into the fractured realms of Hungary.

In recognition for his efforts, on 27 February 1673, Emperor Leopold I appointed him as the Imperial governor of Royal Hungary. Ampringen was appointed governor during the harsh crackdown that followed the Wesselényi conspiracy. Instead of administering the region through the Palatine of Hungary, a governorship was established, which was directly subordinate to the Emperor. The board was headed by the plenipotentiary governor, with four Hungarian and four Austrian councilors participating. The task of the governorship was, among other things, to oversee religious issues (in practice this meant supporting re-Catholicization), to smooth out conflicts between the civilian population and the military, to stabilize the internal affairs situation, and to modernize the public administration. Ampringen's administration was characterized by a heavy-handed approach, as several public executions of disloyal Hungarian nobles happened at this time in a climate of heavy repression of the Empire's perceived enemies. His activities as governor greatly contributed to the rise of the so-called kuruc rebel movement opposing the encroachment of the Habsburgs in Hungary, and later still to the outbreak of the uprising led by Imre Thököly. Ampringen was forced out of Hungary in 1677 and in 1679 he was relieved of his duties at his own request. Emperor Leopold I subsequently restored the abolished palatine office in 1681 and appointed Paul Esterházy as Palatine.

For his next post, on 4 November 1682, the Emperor appointed him as the Governor of Silesia. Since, according to the Great State Privilege of the Bohemian King Vladislaus II of 1498, this office should always be held by a Silesian prince, Freudenthal was raised to the status of duchy for Ampringen's lifetime and he himself was promoted to the rank of Bohemian prince and on 10 November 1682, to the rank of Imperial prince. As Grand Master, he arranged for the renovation of the spacious palace complex in Freudenthal, among other things.

Ampringen died in 1684 as the last of his family in Breslau (present-day Wrocław) and was buried in the church in Freudenthal (now Bruntál). He was succeeded in the office of Grand Master by the Bishop of Worms, Ludwig Anton von Pfalz-Neuburg.

== See also ==
- Magnate conspiracy

Grand Master of the Teutonic Order
Preceded by Charles Joseph	Hochmeister; 1664–1684	Succeeded by Ludwig Anton von Pfalz-Neuburg
