= George III of Hesse-Itter =

George III, Landgrave of Hesse-Itter
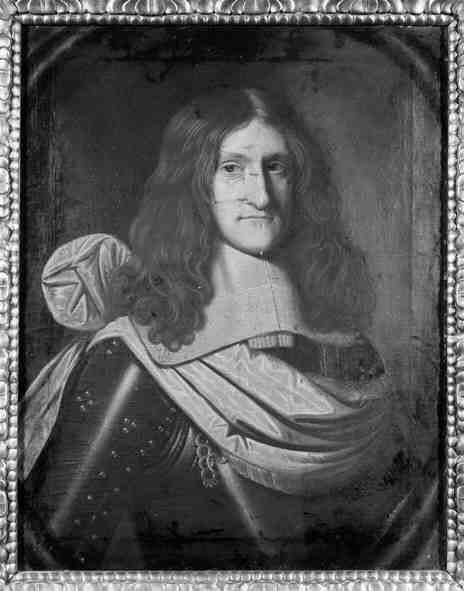
- Born: 29 September 1632; Darmstadt
- Died: 19 July 1676 (aged 43); Hof Lauterbach, now part of Vöhl
- Spouse: Dorothea Auguste of Schleswig-Holstein-Sonderburg-Franzhagen; Juliane Alexandrine of Leinigen-Heidenheim
- House: House of Hesse
- Father: George II, Landgrave of Hesse-Darmstadt
- Mother: Sophia Eleonore of Saxony

Landgrave George III of Hesse-Itter (29 September 1632 in Darmstadt – 19 July 1676 in Hof Lauterbach, now part of Vöhl) was the second son of Landgrave George II of Hesse-Darmstadt and his wife Sophia Eleonore of Saxony (1609–1671). Since he left no male heir, Hesse-Itter fell back to Hesse-Darmstadt.

== Marriages and issue ==
- Georg married on 5 May 1661 to Duchess Dorothea Auguste (30 September 1636 – 18 September 1662), the daughter of John Christian, Duke of Schleswig-Holstein-Sonderburg and Countess Anna of Oldenburg-Delmenhorst. She died after giving birth her only child:
1. Stillborn daughter (18 September 1662 in Vöhl)
- After Dorothea's death, he married on 21 July 1667 to Juliane Alexandrine of Leiningen-Heidenheim (21 August 1651 – 1 April 1703), the daughter of the Count Emich XIII of Leiningen and Countess Dorothea of Waldeck-Wildungen (1617-1661). After George's death, she married Landgrave Charles of Hesse-Wanfried. With her, George had three daughters:
1. Sophie Juliane (17 July 1668 in Vöhl – 9 August 1668 in Vöhl) Died in infancy
2. Eleanore (15 August 1669 in Vöhl – 4 September 1714 in Darmstadt) Never married
3. Magdalene Sibylle (14 October 1671 in Vöhl – 21 April 1720 in Bernstadt) Never married
