= Linda Maria Koldau =

German musicologist

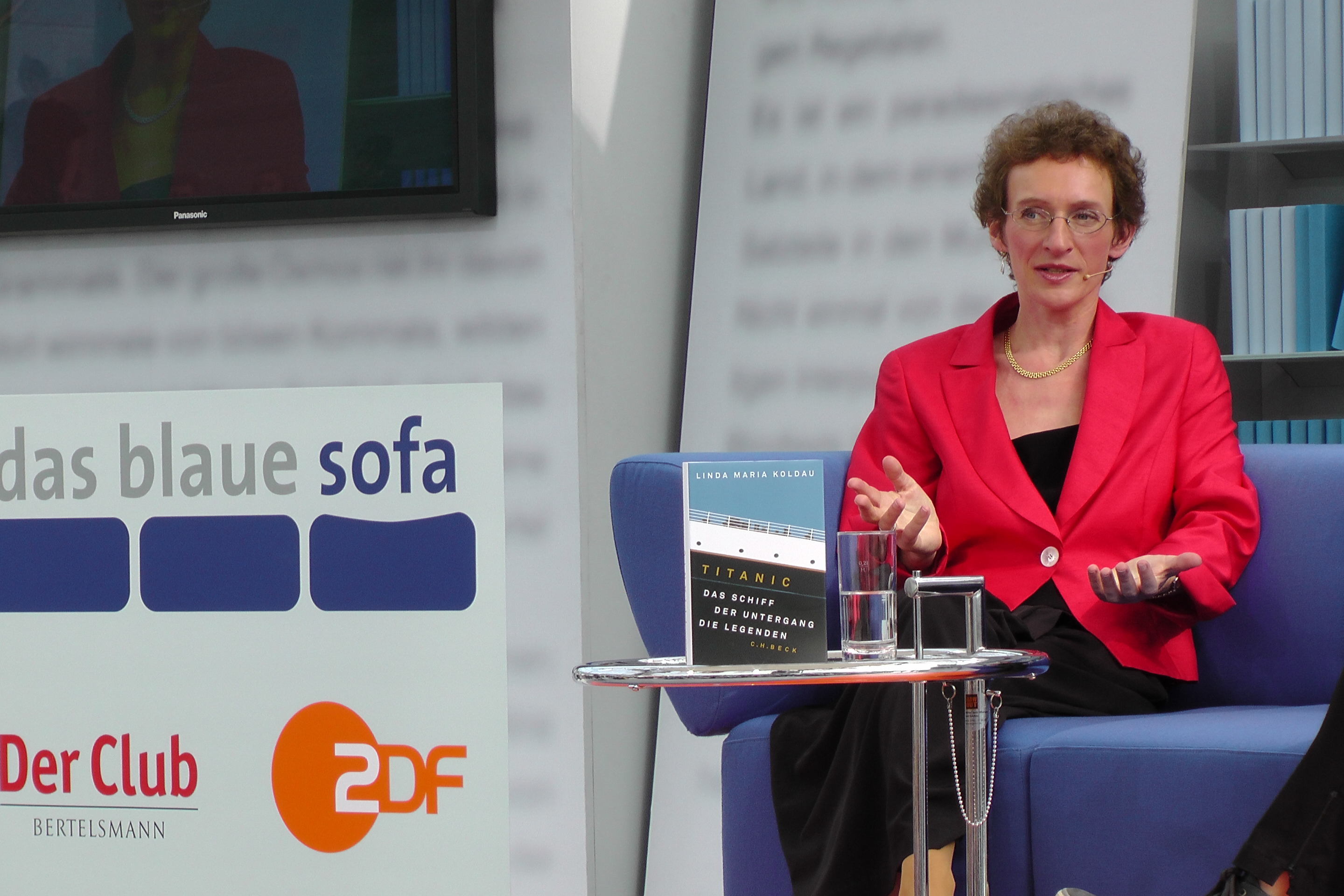
Linda Maria Koldau, cultural scientist and journalist, is Professor of Musicology and Cultural History at Aarhus University in Denmark. She is known to a larger audience through articles in the FAZ and numerous radio broadcasts.

Linda Maria Koldau (born October 28, 1971) is a German musicologist and was Chair of Musicology and Cultural History (formerly Knud Jeppesen's Chair of Musicology) at Aarhus University in Denmark. Since 2013 she has been director of the Coastal Academy (Akademie an der Steilkueste) in Northern Germany, focusing on efficiency, conciseness and perfection in business language and communication.

== Biography ==
Born in Munich, Linda Maria Koldau studied Musicology, American Literature, and Italian Literature at Reading University in England and Mainz University in Germany. In 2000 she finished her PhD at Bonn University with a thesis on the Venetian sacred music by Claudio Monteverdi. In 2005 she received her "Habilitation" at Frankfurt University with a handbook on women in the musical culture of the Early Modern Period. In 2006-2008 she was chair of Musicology and director of the Institute of Musicology at Frankfurt University; in 2009 she was appointed Chair of Musicology and Cultural History at Aarhus University. She is member of several international research groups and interdisciplinary networks and has published widely in several fields of musicology and cultural history. Besides her academic work, she worked as a freelance cultural journalist for Frankfurter Allgemeine Zeitung in the period 1992-2002; since 1995 she has been author of radio programs for various German channels.

In 2012, Koldau resigned from her chair in protest against the low quality of education that had been enforced by the management of her department, and against the general management policies at Aarhus University, which contradicted basic principles of academic research and teaching. Koldau's protest and the disciplinary measures Aarhus University took against her led to several months of protest, numerous articles and letters to the editor in the Danish media, in which Danish and foreign academics and teachers decried the deplorable deterioration of quality and standards in the Danish educational system. Koldau documented her experiences at a later stage in her three-volume documentary novel "Jante University", which is simultaneously designed as a handbook on the general consequences of New Public Management measures for a country’s education and its economy. In 2013 Koldau was awarded a Marie Curie Senior Research Fellowship by the Gerda Henkel Foundation, which she used for a two-year research project on the social and political consequences of major flood disasters in the 20th and early 21st centuries. From 2013 to 2017, Koldau was associated Research Professor for Cultural History at Utrecht University in the Netherlands.

== Work as a veterinary practitioner ==
In 2015-2018 Koldau trained as a veterinary practitioner (Tierheilpraktiker) and veterinary physiotherapist, specializing on veterinarian anatomy and the behaviour and medical treatment of guinea pigs. She has published several textbooks on guinea pigs and issued a number of easy-to-read handbooks and children's books on guinea pigs under the label "Cavia Publishing".

== Books on Musicology and Cultural History ==
- Die venezianische Kirchenmusik von Claudio Monteverdi, Kassel: Bärenreiter, 2001, ^{2}2005
- Frauen - Musik - Kultur. Ein Handbuch zum deutschen Sprachgebiet der Frühen Neuzeit, Köln/Weimar/Wien: Böhlau, 2005, http://www.boehlau.at/978-3-412-24505-4.html
- Die Moldau. Smetanas Zyklus „Mein Vaterland", Köln/Weimar: Böhlau, 2007, http://www.boehlau.at/978-3-412-15306-9.html
- Mythos U-Boot, Stuttgart: Steiner, 2010, http://www.steiner-verlag.de/titel/58165.html
- Passion und Ostern in den Lüneburger Klöstern, Ebstorf: Verlag Kloster Ebstorf, 2010 (ed.)
- Titanic: Das Schiff - der Untergang - die Legenden, Munich: C.H. Beck, 2012, ISBN 978-3-406-62424-7, http://www.chbeck.de/Koldau-Maria-Titanic/productview.aspx?product=8624587
- Titanic on Film: Myth versus Truth, Jefferson, N.C.: McFarland, 2012, ISBN 978-0-7864-6311-4, http://www.mcfarlandpub.com/book-2.php?id=978-0-7864-6311-4
- Jante Universitet. Episoder fra livet bag murene (Jante University. Episodes from Life Behind the Walls). Vol. 1: Den skønne facade (The Beautiful Facade). Vol. 2: Uddannelseskatastrofen (Educational Disaster). Band 3: Totalitære strukturer (Totalitarian Structures). Hamburg: Tredition, 2013. tredition.de (Vol. 1, ISBN 978-3-8495-2491-3). tredition.de (Vol. 2, ISBN 978-3-8495-2496-8). (Vol. 3, ISBN 978-3-8495-0266-9).
- Tsunamis. Entstehung – Geschichte – Prävention. (= C.H. Beck Wissen. Band 2770). Beck, Munich, 2013, ISBN 978-3-406-64656-0.
- "Teresa von Avila". Agentin Gottes 1515-1582. Eine Biographie. C.H. Beck, Munich, 2014, ISBN 978-3-406-66870-8.
- What Is “Professional Musicology”? – And Does It Have a Future? Mini Science Series. Kindle Edition, 2016. https://www.amazon.de/What-Professional-Musicology-Science-English-ebook/dp/B01MQHYBXV/ref=sr_1_18?ie=UTF8&qid=1538828898&sr=8-18&keywords=Koldau.

== Books on Guinea Pigs ==
- Meerschweinchen, Stuttgart: Kosmos, 2017, https://www.kosmos.de/buecher/ratgeber-naturfuehrer/heimtiere/kleintiere/8155/meerschweinchen
- Ethologie des Hausmeerschweinchens, 4 vol.s, Akademie für Tiernaturheilkunde, 2016-2017
- Das beste Meerschweinchen der Welt, Hamburg: Cavia Verlag (tredition), 2019, https://shop.tredition.com/booktitle/Das_beste_Meerschweinchen_der_Welt/W-1_123830
- Sieben Schweinachtswünsche an mein Zweibein, Hamburg: Cavia Verlag (tredition), 2021, https://shop.tredition.com/booktitle/Sieben_Schweinachtsw%3fnsche_an_mein_Zweibein/W-585-413-151
- Was sagt mein Schwein? Ein kleiner Meerschweinchen-Sprachführer, Hamburg: Cavia Verlag (tredition), 2022, https://shop.tredition.com/booktitle/Was_sagt__mein_Schwein/W-773-081-662
- Die Sache mit den Gebrauchtschweinchen ... Und was Meerschweinchen-Anfänger nohc alles wissen sollten, Hamburg: Cavia Verlag (tredition), 2022, https://shop.tredition.com/booktitle/Die_Sache_mit_den_Gebrauchtschweinchen/W-655-583-001

== Organization of international conferences ==
- Passion und Ostern in den Lüneburger Klöstern, VIII. Ebstorfer Kolloquium, Kloster Ebstorf, 25–28 March 2009 https://web.archive.org/web/20110129011053/http://weblab.uni-lueneburg.de/ebstorf/
- Internationale Monteverdi-Interpretationen: Wissenschaft - Praxis - Vermittlung, Universität Frankfurt am Main, 2–4 July 2009 https://web.archive.org/web/20110719102853/http://www.muwi.uni-frankfurt.de/archiv/monteverdi-symposium.html
- Anden Verdenskrig i dansk kulturliv 1940-2010, Aarhus Universitet, 22–23 April 2010
- Weltbild und Lebenswirklichkeit in den Lüneburger Klöstern, IX. Ebstorfer Kolloquium, Kloster Ebstorf, 23–26 March 2011
- Music and the Formation of National Identity, Aarhus Universitet, June 2011
- Verantwortliches Management - Erfolgsmodell Kloster, Kloster Ebstorf, September 2021
