= Philip William, Elector Palatine =

Elector Palatine from 1685 to 1690

Philip William
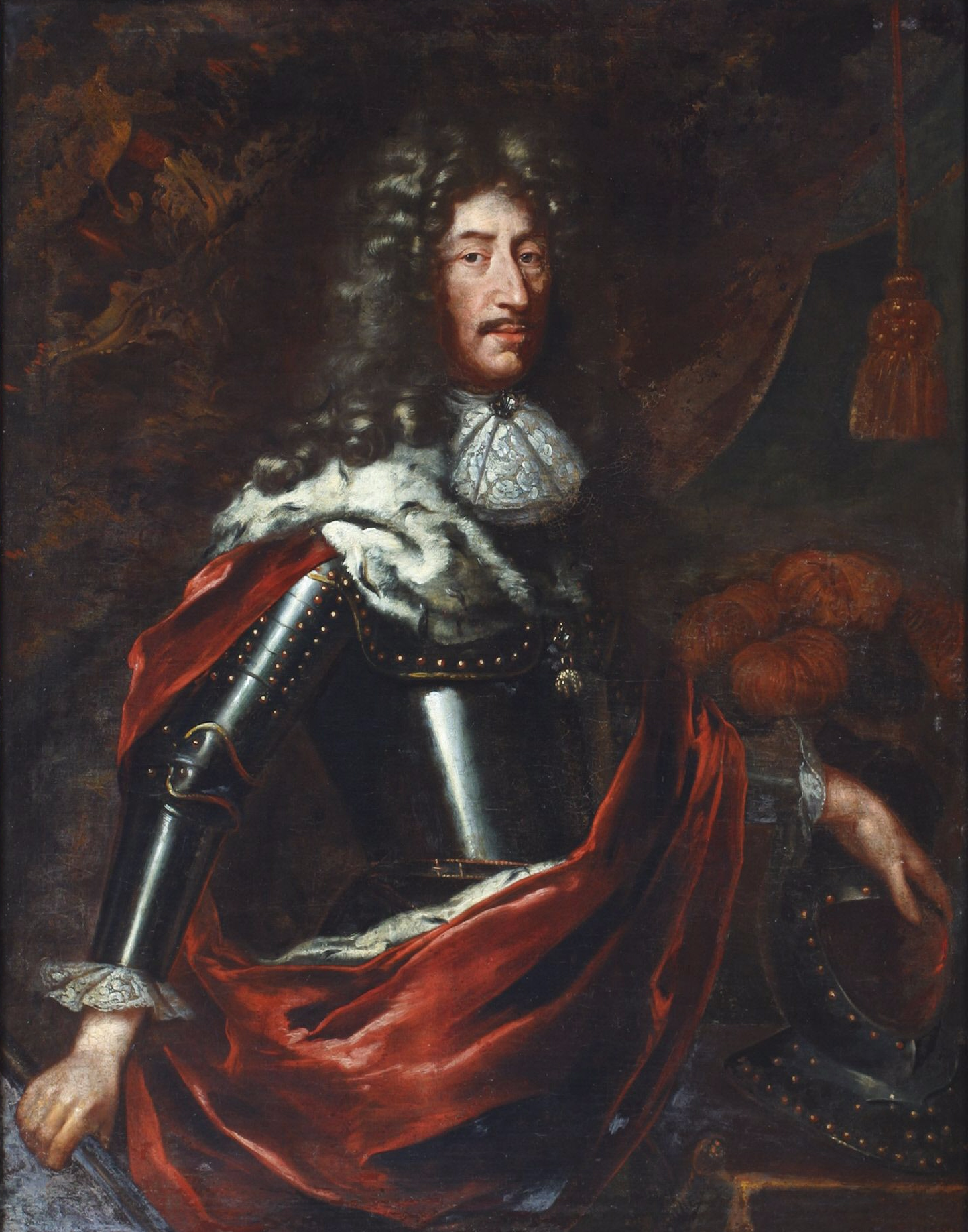
- Philip William in 1685

Elector Palatine
- Reign: 26 May 1685 – 2 September 1690
- Predecessor: Charles II
- Successor: Johann Wilhelm

Count Palatine of Neuburg
- Reign: 14 September 1653 – 2 September 1690
- Predecessor: Wolfgang Wilhelm
- Successor: Johann Wilhelm
- Born: 24 November 1615; New Palace, Gießen
- Died: 2 September 1690 (aged 74); Vienna
- Burial: Neuburg an der Donau, Germany
- Spouse: Anna Catherine Constance Vasa (m. 1642; died 1651) Landgravine Elisabeth Amalie of Hesse-Darmstadt (m. 1653)
- Issue Detail: Eleonore Magdalene, Holy Roman Empress; John William, Elector Palatine; Wolfgang George Frederick von Pfalz-Neuburg; Ludwig Anton von Pfalz-Neuburg; Charles III Philip, Elector Palatine; Alexander Sigismund, Bishop of Augsburg; Francis Louis, Archbishop of Trier; Frederick Wilhelm von Pfalz-Neuburg; Maria Sophia, Queen of Portugal; Maria Anna, Queen of Spain; Philip William August, Count Palatine of Neuburg; Dorothea Sophie, Duchess of Parma; Hedwig Elisabeth, Princess Sobieski; Countess Palatine Leopoldine Eleonora of Neuburg
- House: Wittelsbach
- Father: Wolfgang William, Count Palatine of Neuburg
- Mother: Magdalene of Bavaria
- Religion: Catholicism

Philip William of Neuburg, Elector Palatine (German: Philipp Wilhelm) (24 November 1615 – 2 September 1690) was Count Palatine of Neuburg from 1653 to 1690, Duke of Jülich and Berg from 1653 to 1679 and Elector of the Palatinate from 1685 to 1690. He was the son of Wolfgang Wilhelm, Count Palatine of Neuburg, and Magdalene of Bavaria.

== Life ==
In 1685, with the death of his Protestant cousin, the Elector Palatine Charles II, Philip William inherited the Electorate of the Palatinate, which thus switched from a Protestant to a Catholic territory. Charles II's sister, now the Duchess of Orléans and Louis XIV's sister-in-law, also claimed the Palatinate. This was the pretext for the French invasion in 1688, which began the Nine Years War.

== Marriages ==
Philip William married twice. He first married Princess Anna Catherine Constance Vasa, daughter of Sigismund III Vasa and Constance of Austria. The couple had a son who died at birth. Anne Catherine Constance herself died in 1651.

In 1653 Philipp Wilhelm married Elisabeth Amalie of Hesse-Darmstadt. This second marriage lasted 37 years and was regarded as extremely happy. They had 17 children, including the next two Palatine Electors, John William and Charles III Philip, as well as Elector-Archbishop Franz Ludwig von Pfalz-Neuburg. Many of these children have descendants today. In the early years of their marriage, the couple lived in Düsseldorf, where they founded churches and monasteries.

Issue

Name	Portrait	Lifespan	Notes
Eleonore Magdalene; Holy Roman Empress		6 January 1655- 19 January 1720	Married in 1676 Leopold I, Holy Roman Emperor and had issue;
Maria Adelheid		6 January 1656- 22 December 1656	Died in infancy
Sophia Elisabeth		25 May 1657- 7 February 1658	Died in infancy
Johann Wilhelm; Elector Palatine		19 April 1658- 8 June 1716	Married first Archduchess Maria Anna Josepha of Austria and had issue; married second Anna Maria Luisa de' Medici and had no issue
Wolfgang George Frederik; Auxiliary Bishop in Köln		5 June 1659- 4 June 1683	Died unmarried
Ludwig Anton; Bishop of Worms		9 June 1660- 4 May 1694	Died unmarried
Charles III Philip; Elector Palatine		4 November 1661- 31 December 1742	Married first Ludwika Karolina Radziwiłł and had issue; married second Teresa Lubomirska and had issue; married third Violante Theresia of Thurn und Taxis, no issue
Alexander Sigismund; Bishop of Augsburg		16 April 1663- 24 January 1737	Died unmarried
Francis Louis; Count Palatine; Archbishop of Wrocław		18 July 1664- 6 April 1732	Died unmarried
Frederik Wilhelm; Imperial General		20 July 1665- 23 July 1689	Died unmarried
Maria Sophia Elisabeth; Queen of Portugal		6 August 1666- 4 August 1699	Married in 1687 Peter II of Portugal and had issue
Maria Anna; Queen of Spain		28 October 1667- 16 July 1740	Married in 1690 Charles II of Spain, no issue;
Philip William August		19 November 1668- 5 April 1693	Married in 1690 Anna Maria Franziska of Saxe-Lauenburg and had issue
Dorothea Sophie; Duchess of Parma		5 July 1670- 15 September 1748	Married in 1690 Odoardo Farnese and had issue;
Hedwig Elisabeth Amelia; Princess Sobieski		18 July 1673- 10 August 1722	Married in 1691 James Louis Sobieski and had issue;
Johann		1 February 1675- 2 February 1675	Died in infancy
Leopoldine Eleonora Josepha		27 May 1679 - 8 March 1693	Died unmarried

== Ancestry ==
Ancestors of Philip William, Elector Palatine

8. Wolfgang, Count Palatine of Zweibrücken
4. Philipp Ludwig of Pfalz-Neuburg
9. Anna of Hesse
2. Wolfgang Wilhelm, Count Palatine of Neuburg
10. William, Duke of Jülich-Cleves-Berg
5. Anna of Jülich-Cleves-Berg
11. Archduchess Maria of Austria
1. Philip William, Elector Palatine
12. Albert V, Duke of Bavaria
6. William V, Duke of Bavaria
13. Archduchess Anna of Austria
3. Magdalene of Bavaria
14. Francis I, Duke of Lorraine
7. Renata of Lorraine
15. Christina of Denmark

Philip William, Elector Palatine House of Wittelsbach Born: 1615 Died: 1690
Regnal titles
Preceded by Wolfgang Wilhelm	Count Palatine of Neuburg; 1653–1690	Succeeded by Johann Wilhelm
Preceded by Wolfgang Wilhelm	Duke of Jülich and Berg; 1653–1679	Succeeded by Johann Wilhelm
Preceded by Charles II	Elector Palatine; 1685–1690	Succeeded by Johann Wilhelm
