= George II of Hesse-Darmstadt =

Landgrave of Hesse-Darmstadt

George II
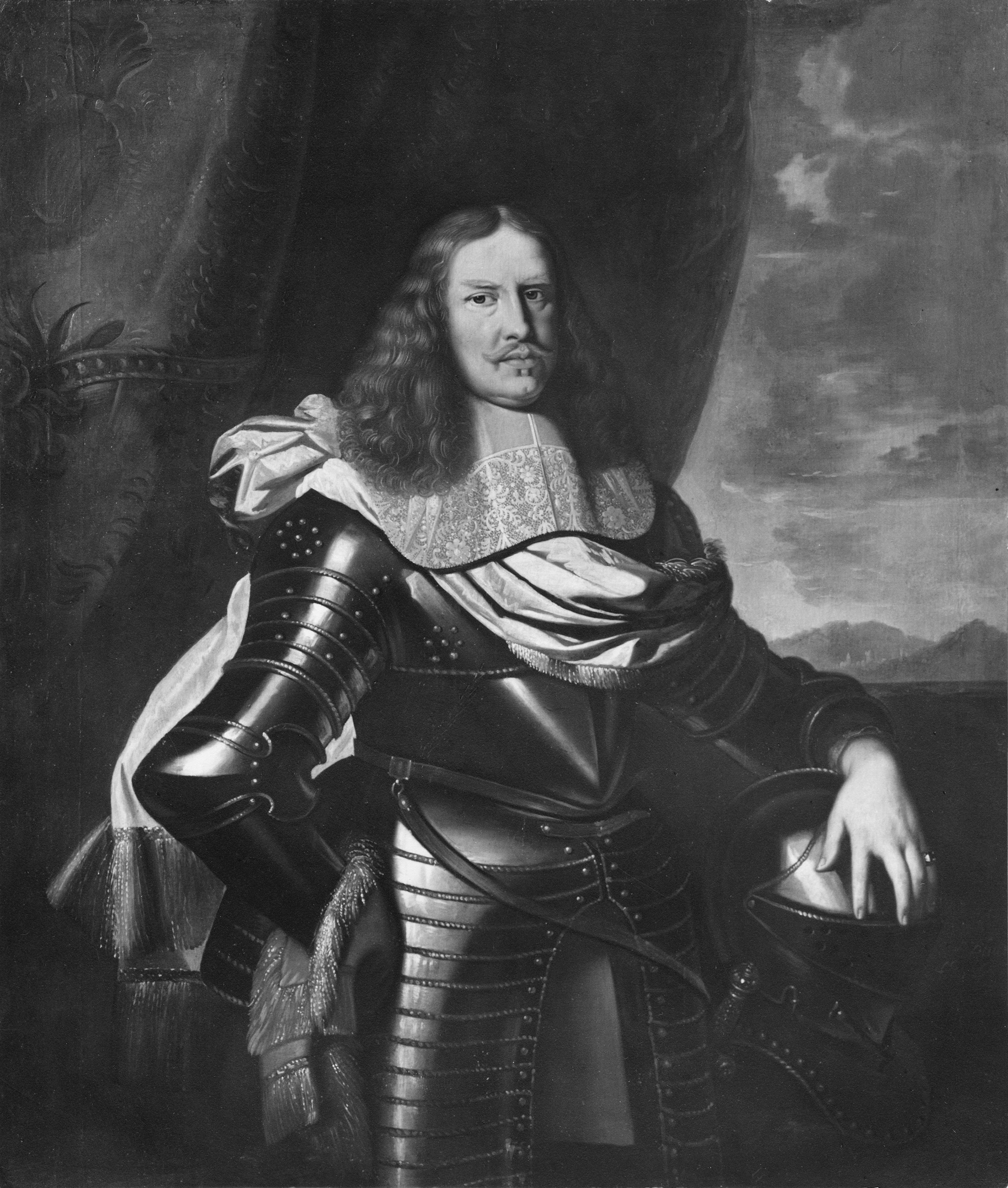
- Posthumous portrait, 1666

Landgrave of Hesse-Darmstadt
- Reign: 27 July 1626 – 11 June 1661
- Predecessor: Louis V
- Successor: Louis VI
- Born: 17 March 1605; Darmstadt
- Died: 11 June 1661 (aged 56); Darmstadt
- Spouse: Sophia Eleonore of Saxony (m. 1627)
- Issue Detail: Louis VI, Landgrave of Hesse-Darmstadt; Princess Magdalena Sybilla; George III, Landgrave of Hesse-Itter; Sophia Eleonore, Landgravine of Hesse-Homburg; Elisabeth Amalie, Electress Palatine; Louise Christine, Countess of Stolberg-Stolberg; Anna Sophia II, Abbess of Quedlinburg; Henrica Dorothea, Countess of Waldeck-Landau; Princess Augusta Philippina; Marie Hedwig, Duchess of Saxe-Meiningen
- House: Hesse-Darmstadt
- Father: Louis V, Landgrave of Hesse-Darmstadt
- Mother: Magdalene of Brandenburg

George II of Hesse-Darmstadt, German: Georg II von Hessen-Darmstadt (17 March 1605 – 11 June 1661) was the Landgrave of Hesse-Darmstadt from 1626 to 1661.

== Early life and ancestry ==
Born into the House of Hesse, George was the eldest son of Ludwig V and his wife, Magdalene of Brandenburg.

== Biography ==
On 1 April 1627 in Torgau, he married Sophia Eleonore of Saxony. Together, they had 15 children, three sons and twelve daughters.

From 1645 to 1648 he led the Hessenkrieg against the Landgravine Amalie Elizabeth of Hesse-Kassel over the inheritance of the extinct line of Hesse-Marburg. This conflict resulted in the loss of Hesse-Marburg to Hesse-Kassel.

== Children ==
- Louis VI (1630–1678), married Maria Elisabeth of Holstein-Gottorp
- Magdalena Sybilla (3 September 1631 – 5 August 1651), never married
- George (1632–1676), married Duchess Dorothea Augusta of Schleswig-Holstein-Sonderburg
- Sophia Eleonore (1634–1663), married Landgrave William Christoph of Hesse-Homburg
- Elisabeth Amalie (1635–1709), married Philip William, Elector Palatine
- Louise Christine (15 January 1636 – 11 November 1697), married Christoph Ludwig I, Count of Stolberg-Stolberg and had issue.
- Anna Maria (9 February 1637 – 21 April 1637), died young
- Anna Sophia II, Princess-Abbess of Quedlinburg (1638–1683)
- Amalia Juliana (28 November 1639– 20 December 1639), died young
- Stillborn daughter (1640)
- Henrica Dorothea (14 October 1641 – 22 December 1672), married Count John II of Waldeck-Landau
- John (24 November 1642 – 22 February 1643), died young
- Augusta Philippina (29 December 1643 – 4 February 1672), never married.
- Agnes (11 November 1645 – 12 November 1645), died young
- Marie Hedwig (1647–1680), married Duke Bernhard I of Saxe-Meiningen

== Further reading- ==
- Georg II., Landgraf von Hessen-Darmstadt (Biography in German)
- Wikisource: Allgemeine Deutsch Biographie "Georg II. (Landgraf von Hesse-Darmstadt)" (in German)

George II of Hesse-Darmstadt House of Hesse Born: 17 March 1605 Died: 11 June 1661
Regnal titles
Preceded by Louis V	Landgrave of Hesse-Darmstadt; 1626–1661	Succeeded by Louis VI
