= Sophie Eleonore of Saxony =

Landgrevinde consort of Hesse-Darmstadt

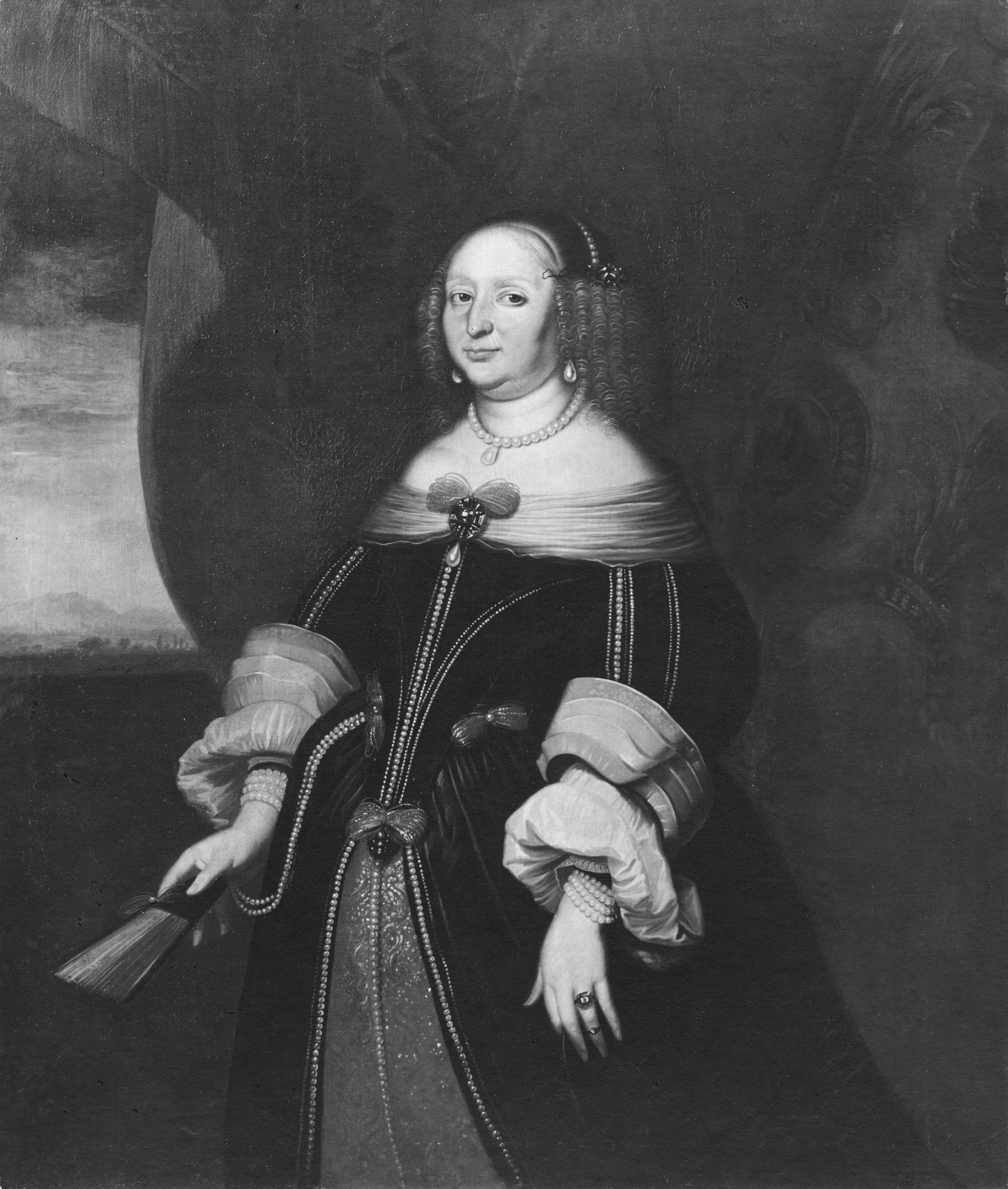
- Portrait by Salomon Duarte, 1666 (Gripsholm Castle, Nationalmuseum)

Landgravine consort of Hesse-Darmstadt
- Tenure: 1 April 1627 – 11 June 1661
- Born: 23 November 1609; Dresden, Electorate of Saxony, Holy Roman Empire
- Died: 2 June 1671 (aged 61); Darmstadt, Landgraviate of Hesse-Darmstadt, Holy Roman Empire
- Spouse: George II, Landgrave of Hesse-Darmstadt (m. 1627; died 1661)
- Issue Detail: Louis VI, Landgrave of Hesse-Darmstadt; Princess Magdalena Sybilla; George III, Landgrave of Hesse-Itter; Sophia Eleonore, Landgravine of Hesse-Homburg; Elisabeth Amalie, Electress Palatine; Louise Christine, Countess of Stolberg-Stolberg; Anna Sophia II, Abbess of Quedlinburg; Henrica Dorothea, Countess of Waldeck-Landau; Princess Augusta Philippina; Marie Hedwig, Duchess of Saxe-Meiningen
- House: Wettin
- Father: John George I, Elector of Saxony
- Mother: Magdalene Sibylle of Prussia

Sophia Eleonore of Saxony (23 November 1609 – 2 June 1671) was a duchess of Saxony by birth and the landgravine of Hesse-Darmstadt from 1627 to 1661 through her marriage to Landgrave George II. She was the eldest surviving child of John George I, Elector of Saxony, and Magdalene Sibylle of Prussia.

== Life ==
She was born in Dresden as the daughter of John George I, Elector of Saxony and Princess Magdalene Sibylle of Prussia.

She married Landgrave Georg II of Hesse-Darmstadt on 1 April 1627 in Torgau, aged seventeen. In the middle of Thirty Years' War their marriage was lavishly celebrated with the first opera in German language: Dafne. They had fifteen children; she raised them as strict Lutherans. However, her daughter Elisabeth Amalie, later Electress Palatine, converted to Roman Catholicism in 1653.

Sophie Eleonore showed huge interest in antiquarian books which she collected. Her contribution to the Hesse-Darmstadt court library is still visible today. She survived her husband by ten years and died in Darmstadt.

== Children ==
She had fifteen children with George II, Landgrave of Hesse-Darmstadt:

- Louis VI (1630–1678)
- Magdalena Sybilla (1631–1651)
- George (1632–1676), married Dorothea Augusta, Duchess of Holstein-Sonderborg
- Sophia Eleonore (1634–1663), married Landgrave William Christoph of Hesse-Homburg
- Elisabeth Amalie (1635–1709), married Philip William, Elector Palatine
- Louise Christine (1636–1697)
- Anna Maria (1637-1637)
- Anna Sophia II, Princess-Abbess of Quedlinburg (1638-1683)
- Amalia Juliana (1639-1639)
- A stillborn daughter (1640)
- Henrica Dorothea (1641–1672), married Count John II of Waldeck-Landau
- John (1642–1643)
- Augusta Philippina (1643–1672)
- Agnes (1645-1645)
- Marie Hedwig (1647–1680), married Duke Bernhard I of Saxe-Meiningen

Sophie Eleonore also suffered four miscarriages:

- A miscarried daughter (1633)
- A miscarried daughter (1644)
- A miscarried son (1646)
- A miscarried son (1649)

Sophie Eleonore of Saxony House of Wettin Born: 23 November 1609 Died: 2 June 1671
German royalty
Vacant Title last held by Magdalene of Brandenburg	Landgravine of Hesse-Darmstadt; 1 April 1627 – 11 June 1661	Succeeded by Maria Elisabeth of Holstein-Gottorp
