= Anna of Cleves (1552–1632) =

Countess Palatine of Neuburg

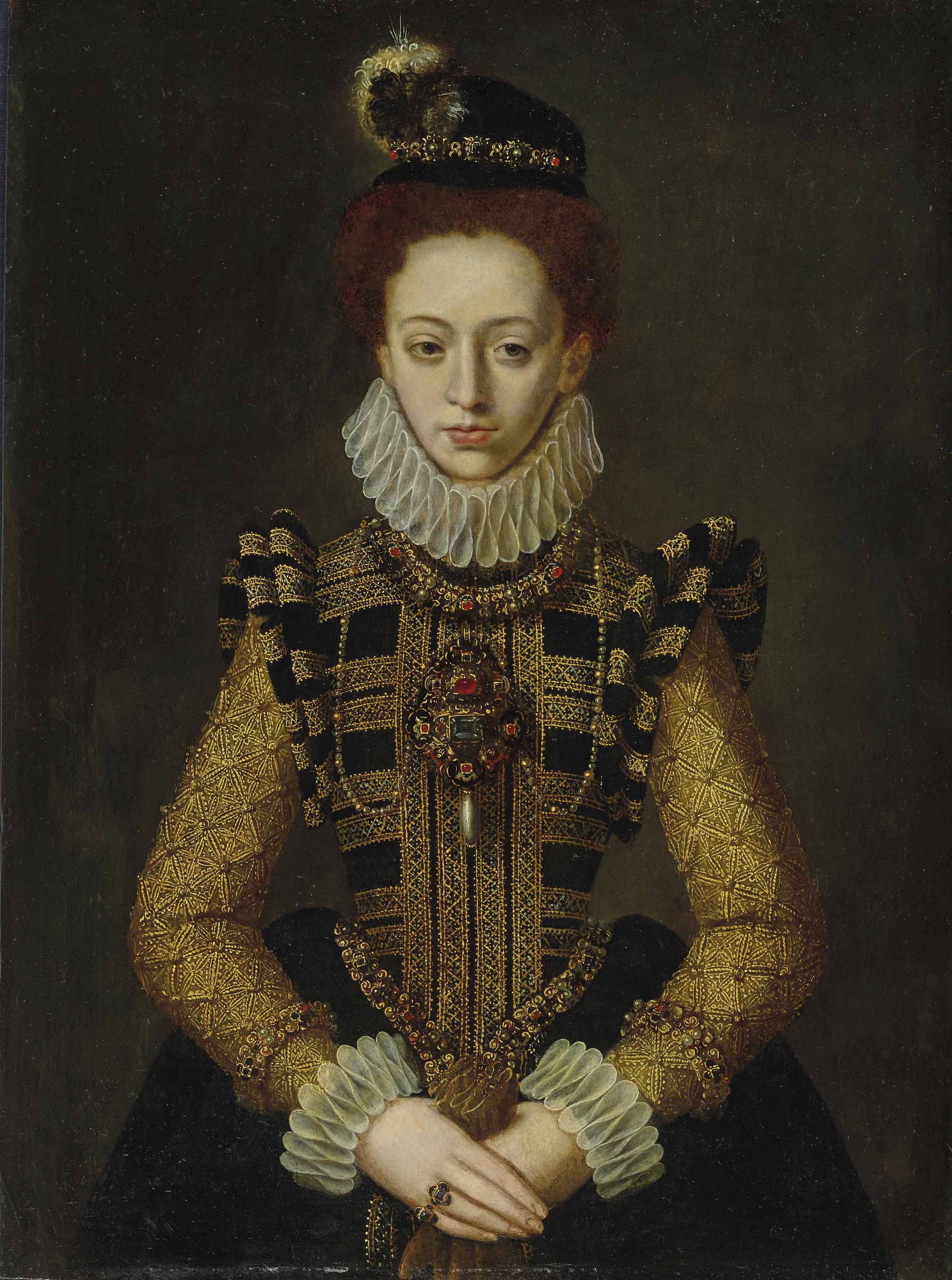
- Portrait by the Master of Ac Monogram, c. 1576
- Born: 1 March 1552; Cleves
- Died: 6 October 1632 (aged 80); Höchstädt an der Donau
- Spouse: Philip Louis, Count Palatine of Neuburg (m. 1574; died 1614)
- Issue: Anna Maria, Duchess of Saxe-Weimar; Countess Palatine Dorothea Sabine of Neuburg; Wolfgang Wilhelm, Count Palatine of Neuburg; Augustus, Count Palatine of Sulzbach; Countess Amalia Hedwig of Neuburg; Johann Friedrich, Count Palatine of Sulzbach-Hilpoltstein
- House: La Marck
- Father: William, Duke of Jülich-Cleves-Berg
- Mother: Archduchess Maria of Austria

Anna of Cleves (1 March 1552, Cleves – 6 October 1632, Höchstädt an der Donau) was the daughter of Duke William V of Jülich-Berg and Maria of Austria. By marriage to Philip Louis, Count Palatine of Neuburg, she became Countess Palatine of Neuburg.

== Marriage and issue ==
She married Count Palatine Philip Louis of Neuburg on 27 September 1574, in Neuburg. They had eight children:

1. Anna Maria (18 August 1575 – 11 February 1643), married on 9 September 1591 to Frederick Wilhelm I, Duke of Saxe-Weimar.
2. Dorothea Sabine (13 October 1576 – 12 December 1598). Her burial gown is one of the few complete women's garments from the sixteenth century to have survived and is preserved in the Bayerisches National Museum in Munich.
3. Wolfgang Wilhelm, Count Palatine of Neuburg (25 October 1578 – 20 March 1653), married:
  1. in 1613 Magdalene of Bavaria (1587–1628)
  2. in 1631 Countess Palatine Catharina Charlotte of Zweibrücken (1615–1651)
  3. in 1651 Countess Maria Francisca of Fürstenberg (1633–1702)
4. Otto Henry (28 October 1580 – 2 March 1581)
5. Augustus, Count Palatine of Sulzbach (2 October 1582 – 14 August 1632), married:
  1. in 1620 Hedwig of Schleswig-Holstein-Gottorp (1603–1657)
6. Amalia Hedwig (24 December 1584 – 15 August 1607)
7. John Frederick, Count Palatine of Sulzbach-Hilpoltstein (23 August 1587 – 19 October 1644), married:
  1. in 1624 Agnes of Hesse-Darmstadt (1604–1664), daughter of Louis V
8. Sophie Barbara (3 April 1590 – 21 December 1591)
