= Magdalena of Brandenburg =

German noble (1582–1616)

Magdalene of Brandenburg
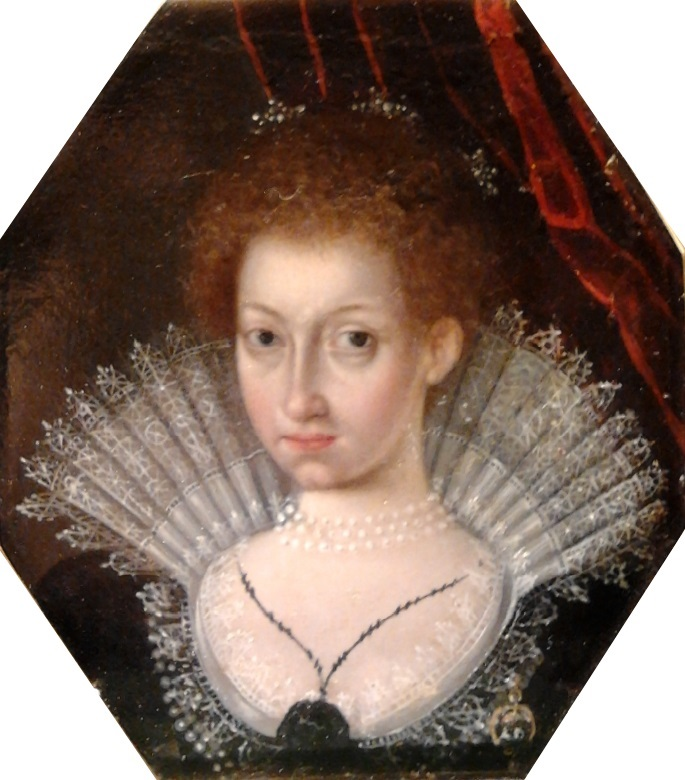
- Magdalene of Brandenburg (c. 1600)
- Born: 7 January 1582; Berlin
- Died: 4 May 1616 (aged 34); Darmstadt
- Spouse: Louis V, Landgrave of Hesse-Darmstadt (m. 1598)
- Issue more...: Anna Eleonore; George II, Landgrave of Hesse-Darmstadt; Juliane; John; Frederick
- House: Hohenzollern
- Father: John George, Elector of Brandenburg
- Mother: Elisabeth of Anhalt-Zerbst

Magdalene of Brandenburg, also Magdalena and Magdalen, (7 January 1582 – 4 May 1616) was the daughter of John George, Elector of Brandenburg, and his third wife Elisabeth of Anhalt-Zerbst.

== Issue ==
She married Louis V, Landgrave of Hesse-Darmstadt on 5 June 1598, and had issue:

- Elisabeth Magdalene, Duchess of Württemberg-Montbéliard; 23 April 1600 (Darmstadt) – 9 June 1624 (Montbéliard), married Louis Frederick, Duke of Württemberg-Montbéliard.
- Anne Eleonore of Hesse-Darmstadt; 30 July 1601 – 6 May 1659.
- Marie; 11 December 1602 – 10 April 1610
- Sofie Agnes of Hesse-Darmstadt; 12 January 1604 (Darmstadt) – 8 September 1664 (Hilpoltstein), married Johann Friedrich, Count Plalatine of Sulzbach-Hilpoltstein.
- George II, Landgrave of Hesse-Darmstadt; 17 March 1605 – 11 June 1661.
- Juliane of Hesse; 14 April 1606 (Darmstadt) – 15 January 1659 (Hanover).
- Amalie Countess of Hesse-Darmstadt; 20 June 1607 – 11 September 1627.
- John of Hesse-Darmstadt; 17 June 1609 (Darmstadt), – 1 April 1651 (Ems).
- Henry of Hesse-Darmstadt; 1 April 1612 (Darmstadt) – 21 October 1629.
- Hedwig of Hesse-Darmstadt; 22 June 1613 Darmstadt – 2 March 1614.
- Louis of Hesse-Darmstadt; 12 September 1614 (Darmstadt) – 16 September 1614.
- Frederick of Hesse-Darmstadt; 28 February 1616 (Darmstadt) – 19 February 1682.

== Ancestors ==
Magdalena's ancestors in three generations
Magdalena von Brandenburg	Father: John George, Elector of Brandenburg	Paternal Grandfather: Joachim II Hector, Elector of Brandenburg	Paternal Great-grandfather: Joachim I Nestor, Elector of Brandenburg
Magdalena von Brandenburg	Father: John George, Elector of Brandenburg	Paternal Grandfather: Joachim II Hector, Elector of Brandenburg	Paternal Great-grandmother: Elisabeth of Denmark
Magdalena von Brandenburg	Father: John George, Elector of Brandenburg	Paternal Grandmother: Magdalena of Saxony	Paternal Great-grandfather: George, Duke of Saxony
Magdalena von Brandenburg	Father: John George, Elector of Brandenburg	Paternal Grandmother: Magdalena of Saxony	Paternal Great-grandmother: Barbara Jagiellon
Magdalena von Brandenburg	Mother: Elisabeth of Anhalt-Zerbst	Maternal Grandfather: Joachim Ernest, Prince of Anhalt	Maternal Great-grandfather: Johann V Prince of Anhalt-Zerbst
Magdalena von Brandenburg	Mother: Elisabeth of Anhalt-Zerbst	Maternal Grandfather: Joachim Ernest, Prince of Anhalt	Maternal Great-grandmother: Margarete of Brandenburg
Magdalena von Brandenburg	Mother: Elisabeth of Anhalt-Zerbst	Maternal Grandmother: Agnes of Barby-Mühlingen	Maternal Great-grandfather: Wolfgang I, Count of Barby-Mühlingen
Magdalena von Brandenburg	Mother: Elisabeth of Anhalt-Zerbst	Maternal Grandmother: Agnes of Barby-Mühlingen	Maternal Great-grandmother: Agnes of Mansfeld

Magdalena of Brandenburg House of Hohenzollern Cadet branch of the Burchardinger dynasty Born: 7 January 1582 Died: 4 May 1616
German royalty
Vacant Title last held by Eleonore of Württemberg	Landgravine consort of Hesse-Darmstadt; 1598–1616	Vacant Title next held by Sophia Eleonore of Saxony
