= Magdalene of Bavaria =

Countess Palatine of Neuburg (1587–1628)

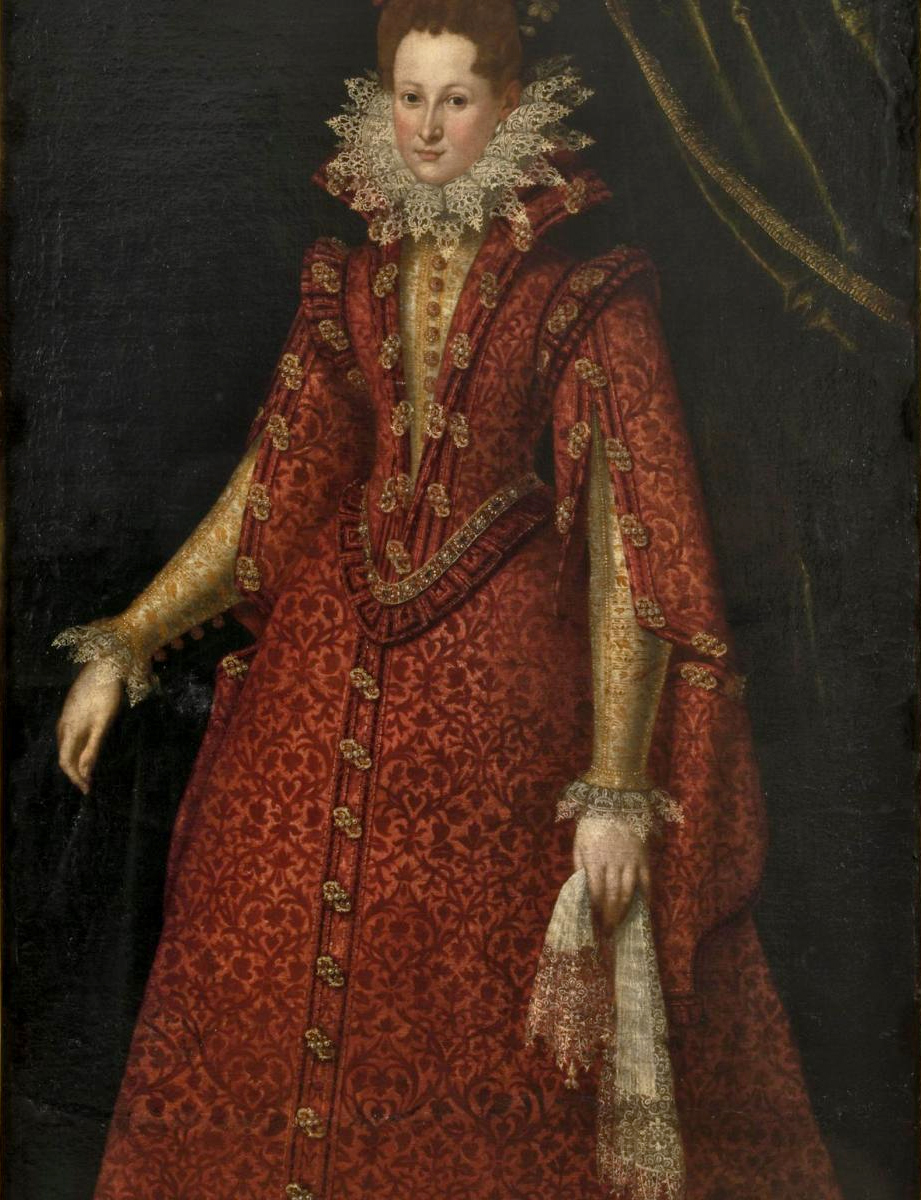
- Born: 4 July 1587; Munich, Duchy of Bavaria, Holy Roman Empire
- Died: 25 September 1628 (aged 41); Neuburg an der Donau, Duchy of Palatinate-Neuburg, Holy Roman Empire
- Spouse: Wolfgang William, Count Palatine of Neuburg (m. 1613)
- Issue: Philip William, Elector Palatine
- House: Wittelsbach
- Father: William V, Duke of Bavaria
- Mother: Renata of Lorraine
- Religion: Roman Catholicism

Magdalene of Bavaria (German: Magdalena von Bayern) (4 July 1587 – 25 September 1628) was a German princess of the House of Wittelsbach who became Countess Palatine of Neuburg and Duchess of Jülich-Berg by marriage.

She was born in Munich, Bavaria, the tenth and youngest child of William V, Duke of Bavaria and Renata of Lorraine.

== Life ==
In 1607, Archduke Matthias of Austria asked for Magdalene's hand in marriage. The initiator of this project was Matthias' advisor Melchior Khlesl, who wanted the help of Bavaria in the dispute between the Archduke and his brother Rudolf II, Holy Roman Emperor. Although Magdalene's father was inclined to accept this union, her brother Maximilian I later refused her hand because he didn't want to become involved in the Austrian Habsburg dynastic disputes. In 1608, Matthias officially renounced the Bavarian marriage at the request of his brother. Shortly after, Archduke Leopold V showed interest in Magdalene.

In May 1609 Leopold V visited Munich and agreed to renounce his ecclesiastical positions in order to marry Magdalene. During this visit, she developed feelings for her suitor and stated that, "for Matthias she didn't have any feelings of affection" and would prefer to become a nun rather than marrying him. Under the pressure from both her father and brother, Magdalene finally accepted a political marriage in 1613.

On 11 November 1613 at Munich, Magdalene married Wolfgang Wilhelm, Hereditary Prince of the Palatine-Neuburg, a close friend of her brother Maximilian; with this union, the Bavarian rulers hoped that the Lutheran Wolfgang Wilhelm would return to the Catholic faith. The wedding ceremony was performed by the Prince-Bishop of Eichstätt, Johann Christoph von Westerstetten, in the Frauenkirche; the subsequent marriage ceremonies were very complex, in the presence of 17 sovereign princes. Three days later (14 November), Magdalene renounced for herself and her descendants to any succession rights over Bavaria. As a dowry, Wolfgang Wilhelm received the amount of 50,000 guilders, and Magdalene received an additional 30,000 florins from her brother as a gift.

Magdalene set up a Catholic chapel at Neuburg Castle with the two Jesuits who had accompanied her. Shortly after, both Jesuits were sent to the Netherlands by Magdalene's father-in-law Philipp Ludwig, Count Palatine of Neuburg.

On 15 May 1614, a few months before his father's death, Wolfgang Wilhelm (under the influence of his wife), in the Düsseldorf Church of St. Lambertus officially converted to the Catholic faith. For the Counter-Reformation, this was significant success with credit being given to Magdalene and her commitment to her brother's policy. The marriage between Magdalene and Wolfgang Wilhelm, despite all the problems, was a very happy one. Magdalene was described as very similar to her brother, being both wise and politically astute. On 4 October 1615 she gave birth to her only child, Philip William, named after both grandparents.

Magdalene died unexpectedly in Neuburg an der Donau aged 41. She was buried in the newly built Neuburger Jesuit Church crypt.

== Ancestors ==
Magdalene's ancestors in three generations
Magdalene of Bavaria	Father: William V, Duke of Bavaria	Paternal grandfather: Albert V, Duke of Bavaria	Paternal great-grandfather: William IV, Duke of Bavaria
Magdalene of Bavaria	Father: William V, Duke of Bavaria	Paternal grandfather: Albert V, Duke of Bavaria	Paternal great-grandmother: Marie of Baden-Sponheim
Magdalene of Bavaria	Father: William V, Duke of Bavaria	Paternal grandmother: Anna of Austria	Paternal great-grandfather: Ferdinand I, Holy Roman Emperor
Magdalene of Bavaria	Father: William V, Duke of Bavaria	Paternal grandmother: Anna of Austria	Paternal great-grandmother: Anna of Bohemia and Hungary
Magdalene of Bavaria	Mother: Renata of Lorraine	Maternal grandfather: Francis I, Duke of Lorraine	Maternal great-grandfather: Antoine, Duke of Lorraine
Magdalene of Bavaria	Mother: Renata of Lorraine	Maternal grandfather: Francis I, Duke of Lorraine	Maternal great-grandmother: Renée of Bourbon-Montpensier
Magdalene of Bavaria	Mother: Renata of Lorraine	Maternal grandmother: Christina of Denmark	Maternal great-grandfather: Christian II of Denmark
Magdalene of Bavaria	Mother: Renata of Lorraine	Maternal grandmother: Christina of Denmark	Maternal great-grandmother: Isabella of Austria
