= Ernest Augustus, Elector of Hanover =

Ernest Augustus
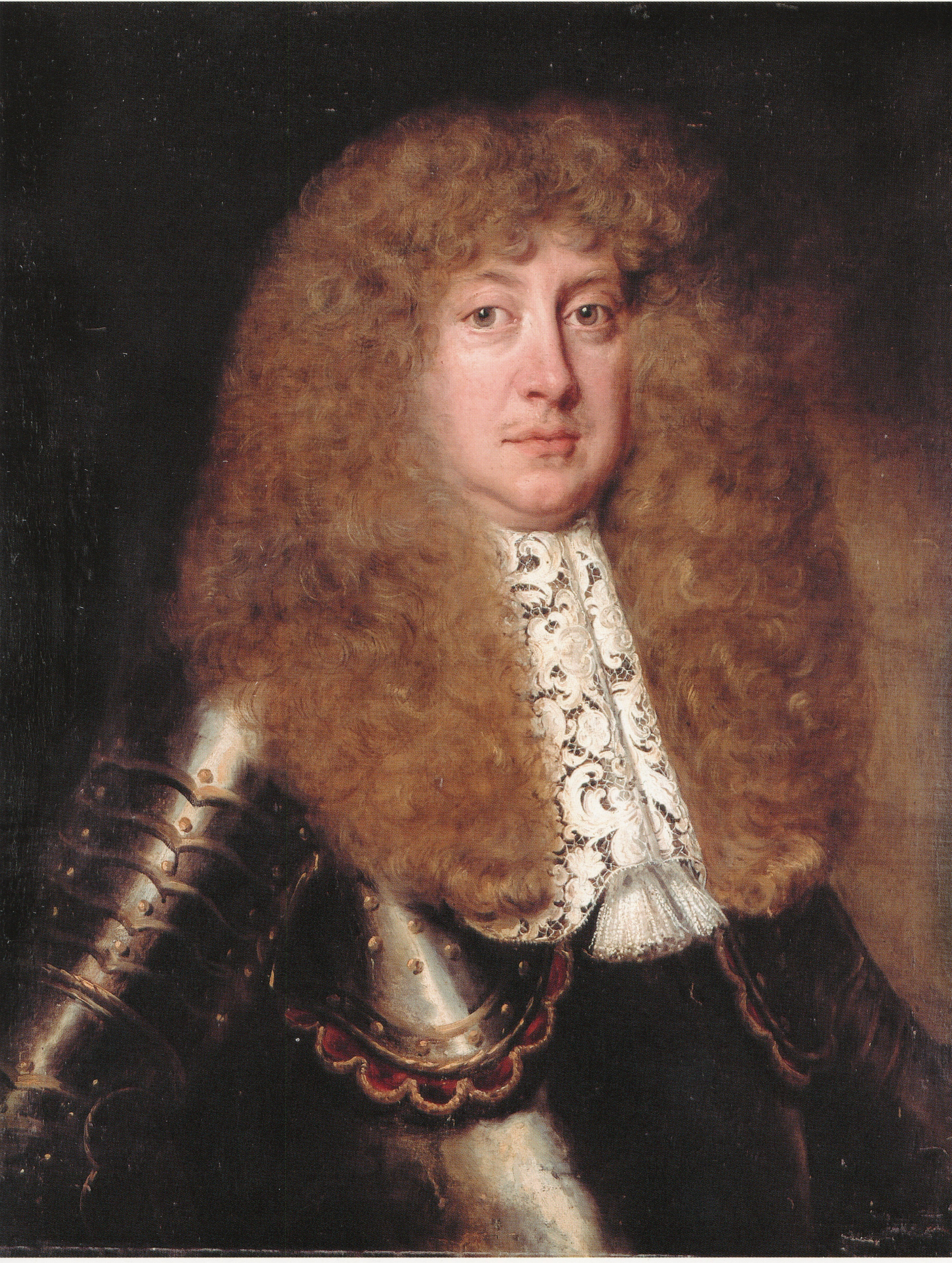
- Portrait by Jacob Ferdinand Voet, c. 1670

Elector of Hanover (designate)
- Reign: 19 December 1692 – 23 January 1698
- Successor: George I

Duke of Brunswick-Lüneburg Prince of Calenberg
- Reign: 18 December 1679 – 23 January 1698
- Predecessor: John Frederick
- Successor: George I
- Born: 20 November 1629; Herzberg Castle, Herzberg am Harz
- Died: 23 January 1698 (aged 68); Herrenhausen Palace, Hanover
- Burial: 18 March 1698; Leine Palace, Hanover; later Herrenhausen
- Spouse: Princess Sophia of the Palatinate (m. 1658)
- Issue more...: George I of Great Britain; Prince Maximilian William; Sophia Charlotte, Queen in Prussia; Prince Ernest Augustus, Duke of York and Albany; Sophia, Countess of Darlington (ill.)
- House: Hanover
- Father: George, Duke of Brunswick-Calenberg
- Mother: Anne Eleonore of Hesse-Darmstadt

Ernest Augustus (German: Ernst August; 20 November 1629 – 23 January 1698), Duke of Brunswick-Lüneburg, was Prince of Calenberg from 1679 until his death, and father of King George I of Great Britain. He was appointed as the ninth prince-elector of the Holy Roman Empire in 1692.

He was also ruler of the Prince-Bishopric of Osnabrück from 1662 until his death.

== Early life and marriage ==
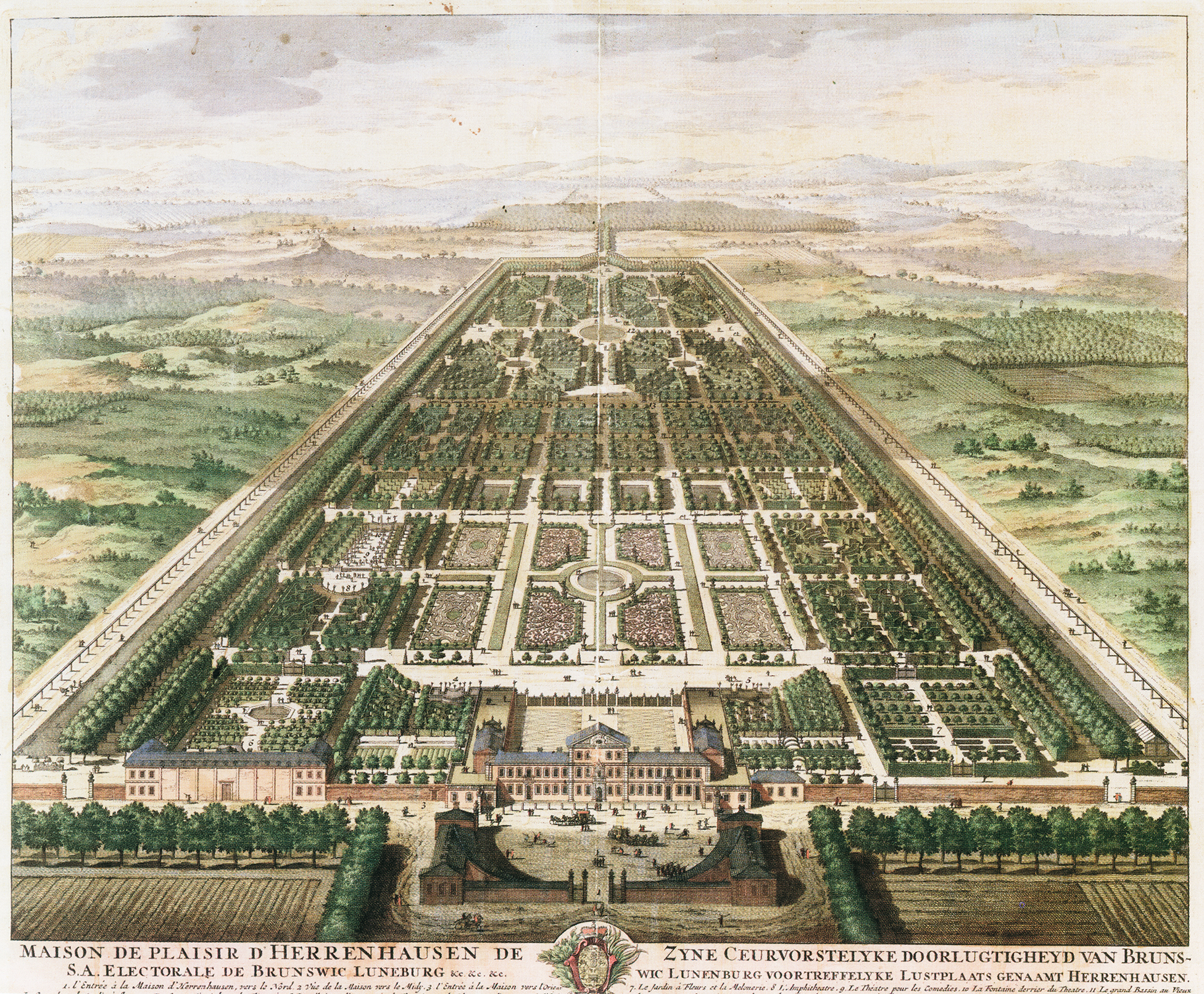
Herrenhausen Great Garden, Hanover

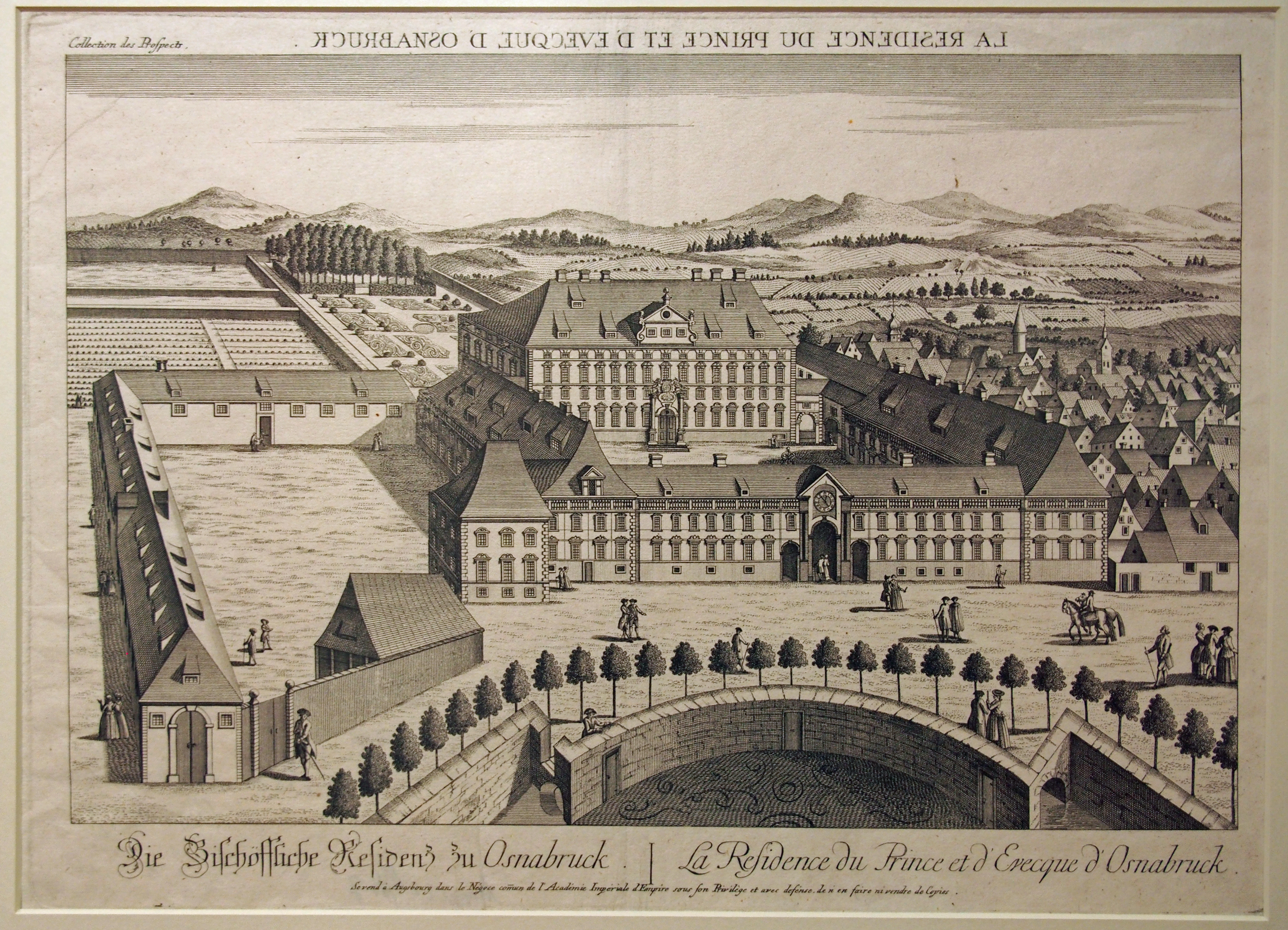
Osnabruck Palace

Ernest Augustus was born on 20 November 1629 at Herzberg Castle near Göttingen, Principality of Calenberg, the youngest son of George, Duke of Brunswick-Calenberg and Prince of Calenberg, and Anne Eleonore of Hesse-Darmstadt.

On 30 September 1658, he married Sophia of the Palatinate in Heidelberg. She was the daughter of Frederick V of the Palatinate and Elizabeth Stuart of England, and granddaughter of King James I of England. Sophia had been betrothed to Ernest Augustus's older brother, George William, who did not want her. When she married Ernest Augustus instead, releasing George William from this obligation, George William ceded to Ernest Augustus his claim to Lüneburg.

== Prince-Bishop ==
As the fourth son, Ernest Augustus had little chance of succeeding his father as ruler. Therefore, the couple had to live in the Leineschloss at the Hanover court of Ernest Augustus' eldest brother Christian Louis. However, in the Peace of Westphalia of 1648, it had been agreed between the Catholic and Protestant powers that the rulership of the Prince-Bishopric of Osnabrück should alternate between the two churches, and that the respective Protestant bishops should be members of the House of Welf. When the Osnabruck throne became vacant in 1662, the family appointed Ernest Augustus Prince-Bishop.

Ernest Augustus and Sophia moved to Iburg Castle, together with their two living sons and Sophia's niece Princess Elizabeth Charlotte of the Palatinate (future sister-in-law of Louis XIV of France). In 1667 they began to build a more up-to-date residence, Osnabruck Palace, and in 1673 they moved there. Their youngest son was born there in 1674.

Christian Louis died childless in 1665, leaving Lüneburg to the second brother, George William, who had ceded his right to Ernest Augustus, who thus succeeded to that title. George William kept the district of Celle for himself.

In 1679, Ernest Augustus inherited the Principality of Calenberg from his third brother John Frederick. In 1680 the family moved back to Hanover.

== Prince-elector ==
Arms of Ernest as Duke of Brunswick-Lüneburg 1679–1692

Arms of Ernest August as Elector-designate 1692–1698

In 1683, against the protestations of his five younger sons, Ernest Augustus instituted primogeniture, so that his territory would not be further subdivided after his death, and also as a pre-condition for obtaining the coveted electorship. He participated in the Great Turkish War on the side of Leopold I, Holy Roman Emperor.

In 1692, he was appointed Prince-elector by the Emperor, thus raising the House of Hanover to electoral dignity, the elevation becoming effective in 1708 when confirmed by the Imperial Diet. He was nonetheless recognized as Elector of Hanover, the very first.

== Death, succession, and legacy ==
Ernest Augustus died in 1698 at Herrenhausen Palace, Hanover. He was succeeded as ruler by his eldest son, George Louis, later King George I of Great Britain.

His main residences were the Leineschloss, in Hanover, and the Herrenhausen, a summer residence a short distance outside the city. Ernest Augustus and Sophia had the Great Garden at Herrenhausen enlarged after Italian and Dutch models, creating one of the most distinguished baroque formal gardens of Europe.

== Issue ==
Name	Birth	Death	Notes
By his wife, Sophia of the Palatinate
George Louis	28 May 1660	11 June 1727	First, succeeded his mother Sophia as heir presumptive to the throne of Great Britain; Second, succeeded Anne, Queen of Great Britain as King George I of Great Britain, the first member of Britain's Hanoverian dynasty.
Frederick Augustus	3 October 1661	10 June 1691	Died at the Battle of St. Georgen, never married nor had issue
Stillborn twin sons	February 1664	February 1664	
Maximilian William	13 December 1666	27 July 1726	
Stillborn son	13 December 1666	13 December 1666	Twin of Maximilian
Sophia Charlotte	2 October 1668	21 January 1705	Married King Frederick I of Prussia
Charles Philip	13 October 1669	1 January 1690	Died at the Battle of Pristina, died unmarried with no issue
Christian Henry	29 September 1671	31 July 1703	Died unmarried without issue during the Battle of Munderkingen when drowned in the Danube,
Ernest Augustus	7 September 1674	14 August 1728	Duke of York and Albany
By his mistress, Clara Elisabeth von Platen
Ernest August von Platen	1674	1726	Had issue
Sophie Charlotte von Platen	10 April 1675	20 April 1725	Married in 1701 to Baron Johann Adolf von Kielmansegg, had issue

== Ancestry ==
Ancestors of Ernest Augustus, Elector of Hanover

8. Ernest I, Duke of Brunswick-Lüneburg
4. William, Duke of Brunswick-Lüneburg
9. Sophia of Mecklenburg-Schwerin
2. George, Duke of Brunswick-Lüneburg
10. Christian III of Denmark
5. Dorothea of Denmark
11. Dorothea of Saxe-Lauenburg
1. Ernest Augustus, Elector of Brunswick-Lüneburg
12. George I, Landgrave of Hesse-Darmstadt
6. Louis V, Landgrave of Hesse-Darmstadt
13. Magdalene of Lippe
3. Anne Eleonore of Hesse-Darmstadt
14. John George, Elector of Brandenburg
7. Magdalene of Brandenburg
15. Elisabeth of Anhalt-Zerbst

Ernest Augustus, Elector of Hanover House of Hanover Cadet branch of the House of Welf Born: 20 November 1629 Died: 23 January 1698
Religious titles
Preceded by Francis William, Count of Wartenberg	Administrator of the Prince-Bishopric of Osnabrück; 1662–1698	Succeeded by Charles Joseph
Regnal titles
Preceded by John Frederick	Duke of Brunswick-Lüneburg; Prince of Calenberg; 1679–1698	Succeeded by George I Louis
New creation	Elector of Hanover (designate); 1692–1698	Succeeded by George I Louis
