= Maximilian William of Brunswick-Lüneburg =

German field marshal (1666–1726)

Maximilian William
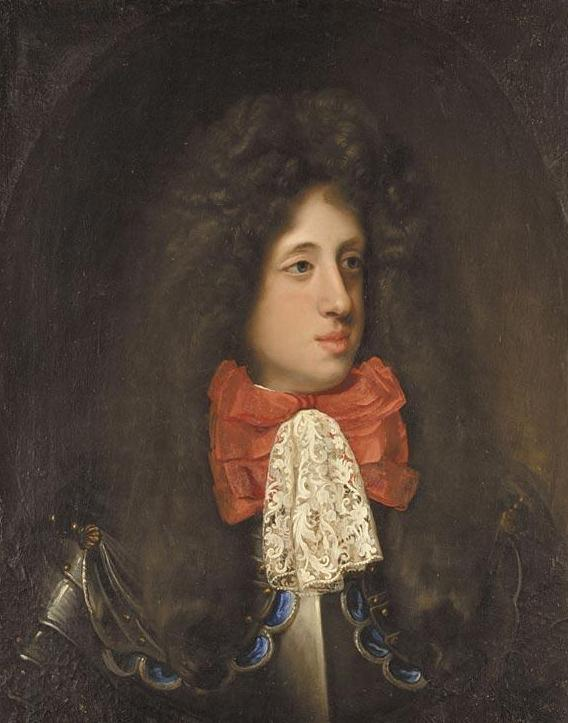
- Portrait by Jacques Vaillant
- Born: 13 December 1666; Schloss Iburg, Brunswick-Lüneburg, Holy Roman Empire
- Died: 16 July 1726 (aged 59); Vienna, Austria, Holy Roman Empire
- House: Hanover
- Father: Ernest Augustus, Elector of Brunswick-Lüneburg
- Mother: Sophia of the Palatinate
- Religion: Roman Catholicism prev. Lutheranism

Duke Maximilian William of Brunswick-Lüneburg (German: Maximilian Wilhelm; 13 December 1666 – 16 July 1726), often called Max, was a member of the House of Hanover who served as an Imperial Field Marshal.

== Childhood ==
Maximilian William was born on 13 December 1666 at Schloss Iburg near Osnabrück. His parents were Ernest Augustus, Duke of Brunswick-Lüneburg, and Sophia of the Palatinate, and he was the third of six sons to survive to adulthood. In her memoirs, Duchess Sophia described this childbirth as very difficult; Maximilian William's younger twin brother was stillborn and it was believed that the Duchess would not survive the ordeal for long. The newborn duke was named after the Archbishop-Elector of Cologne Maximilian Henry of Bavaria and the "Great" Elector of Brandenburg Frederick William.

Sophia was a caring mother, but was concerned by Maximilian William's lack of "geist". Her firstborn, George Louis, suspected that she favoured Maximilian William, especially after the latter lost two fingers in a hunting accident.

== Disinheritance and plot ==
Traditionally, the Welf lands were equally divided among sons. In 1684, however, the family agreed to adopt the principle of primogeniture, allowing the entire inheritance to pass to the eldest son and thus preventing further division of the Duchy of Brunswick-Lüneburg into insignificant statelets. The seventeen-year-old Maximilian William voiced no objection. On his eighteenth birthday, his father signed a contract with the Republic of Venice, whereby he sent him to the Morean War as general of Brunswick-Lüneburg troops and nominal commander of 2400 men. Maximilian William, however, was to be under actual command of a more experienced officer, and that officer was to take orders from the future Doge of Venice Francesco Morosini. The war lasted until 1688.

Maximilian William's elder brother, Frederick Augustus, the second son, was killed in battle in 1691. His death made Maximilian William the Duke's second son and prompted him to claim the right to inheritance he had been deprived of in favour of his eldest brother, George Louis. Maximilian William and his second-youngest brother, Christian Henry, announced that they would not recognize the adoption of primogeniture. Maximilian William proceeded to plot to set primogeniture aside, assisted primarily by the Master of the Hunt Joachim von Moltke. Anthony Ulrich, Duke of Brunswick-Wolfenbüttel, and the prime minister of Brandenburg Eberhard von Danckelmann were also implicated, and it is believed that Duchess Sophia was aware of the conspiracy but did not wish to estrange herself from her younger sons. His sister, Electress Sophia Charlotte of Brandenburg, informed their father of the plot by letter in 1691. Maximilian William and Moltke were imprisoned at the end of the year and charged with high treason. Moltke was executed, while Maximilian William was exiled the following year. He first sought protection from his paternal uncle, George William, and then went to Vienna to serve Emperor Leopold I.

== Imperial service ==
Serving the Emperor, Maximilian William converted to Roman Catholicism, in 1692 and rose to the rank of Generalfeldmarschall. He commanded the Hanoverian troops in the War of the Spanish Succession and was in command of the cavalry under Eugene of Savoy at the Battle of Blenheim.

The Act of Settlement 1701 established that Maximilian William's mother Sophia, as a Protestant relative of Queen Anne, would succeed to the English throne, and that she would be followed by her Protestant descendants. Having already converted to Roman Catholicism, Maximilian William was not included in the line of succession. Anne outlived Sophia by less than two months, both dying in 1714. Anne was thus succeeded by Maximilian William's brother George Louis, who had inherited Brunswick-Lüneburg on their father's death in 1698. Maximilian William and Ernest Augustus were George Louis's only living brothers at the time, but unlike the latter, Maximilian William received no peerage titles from the new King of Great Britain. Maximilian William was elected Prince-Bishop of Osnabrück in 1715, but the election was declared void because it was the turn of a Lutheran to hold the office; it was thus granted to Ernest Augustus.

Maximilian William died in Vienna on 16 July 1726.

Left an illegitimate daughter by an unknown woman;

Maria Guelf (1695-1740) married Jean Meinet, had issue.

== Ancestors ==
Ancestors of Maximilian William of Brunswick-Lüneburg

8. William, Duke of Brunswick-Lüneburg
4. George, Duke of Brunswick-Lüneburg
9. Princess Dorothea of Denmark
2. Ernest Augustus, Elector of Hanover
10. Louis V, Landgrave of Hesse-Darmstadt
5. Landgravine Anne Eleonore of Hesse-Darmstadt
11. Princess Magdalene of Brandenburg
1. Maximilian William of Brunswick-Lüneburg
12. Frederick IV, Elector Palatine of the Rhine
6. Frederick V, Elector Palatine of the Rhine
13. Countess Louise Juliana of Orange-Nassau
3. Princess Sophia of the Palatinate
14. James I of England and VI of Scotland
7. Princess Elizabeth of England and Scotland
15. Princess Anne of Denmark
