= Philip III of Hesse-Butzbach =

Philip III, Landgrave of Hesse-Butzbach
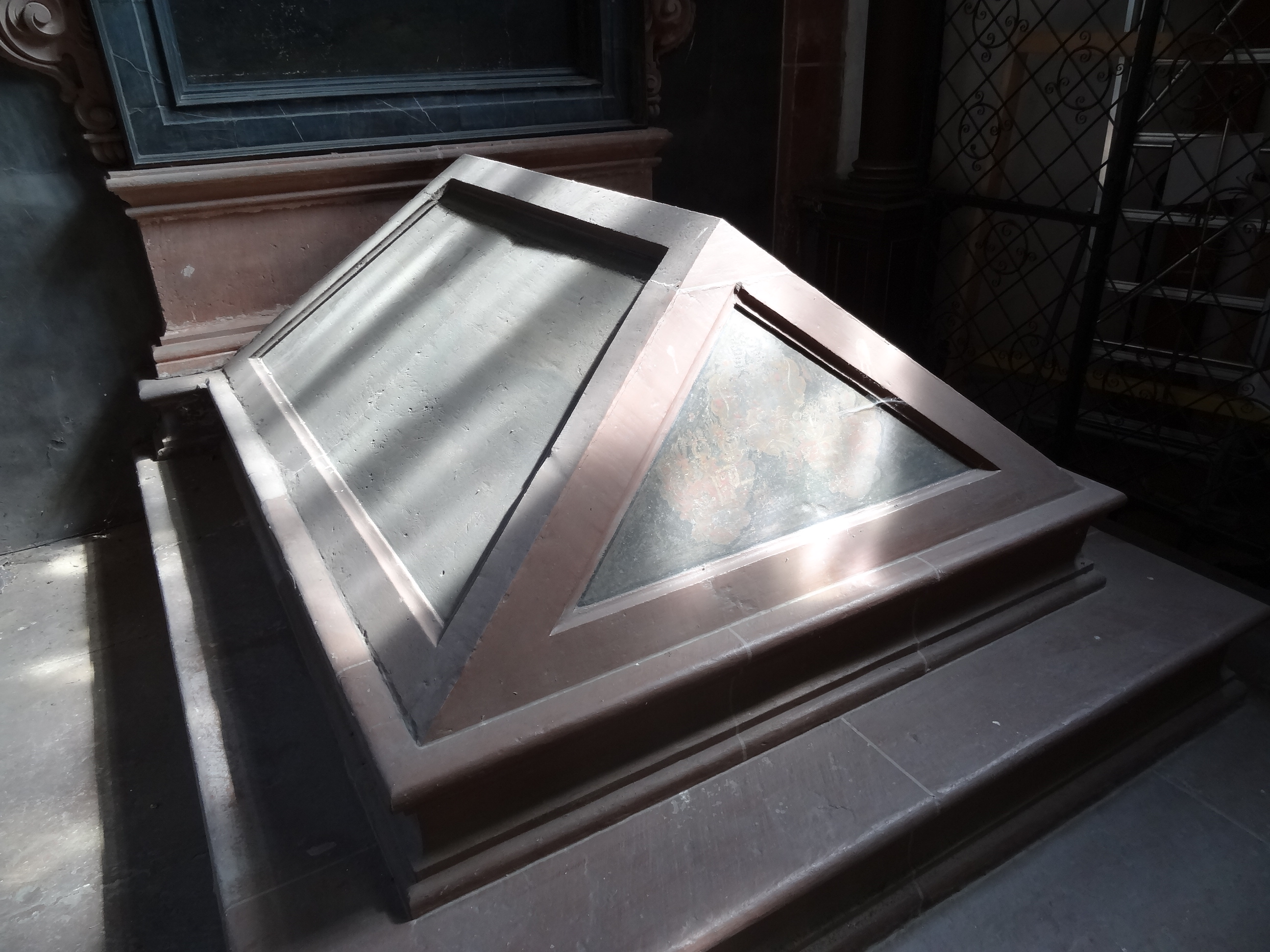
- Philipp's grave in Markuskirche (Butzbach)
- Born: 26 December 1581; Darmstadt
- Died: 28 April 1643 (aged 61); Bad Ems
- Spouse: Anna Margaretha of Diepholz; Christina Sophia of East Frisia
- House: House of Hesse
- Father: George I, Landgrave of Hesse-Darmstadt
- Mother: Magdalene of Lippe

Landgrave Philip III of Hesse-Butzbach (born 26 December 1581 in Darmstadt; died: 28 April 1643) was Landgrave of Hesse-Butzbach from 1609 to 1643.

== Early life ==
Philip was born in Darmstadt, as the second surviving son of George I "the Pious" of Hesse-Darmstadt (1547–1596) and his first wife, Countess Magdalene of Lippe (1552–1587).

== Biography ==
When his father died in 1596, the country was divided into three parts. Hesse-Darmstadt, like many royal courts, practiced primogeniture, meaning that the oldest son inherited the country and his younger brothers were compensated with money, or, if no money was available, a much smaller, non-sovereign, territory and less money. The younger sons were allowed to use the title of "Landgrave", but sovereignty remained with the eldest son. In this case, eldest son, Louis V "the faithful" inherited the bulk of the country. Frederick received Homburg and founded the Hesse-Homburg line. Philip received Butzbach.

His Landgraviate of Butzbach initially consisted only of the town of Butzbach and some nearby villages. A quarter of Solms-Braunfels was added during the Thirty Years' War, when the Count of Solms-Braunfels had fallen into disfavour with the Emperor. In 1639, the town of Itter in Waldeck was added, with the castle at Vöhl and the villages that belonged to the castle. At that time, however, Philip's annual jointer of 24000guilders was reduced by 7300 guilders.

The new residence Butzbach flourished in the middle of the Thirty Years' War. Landgrave Philip was a learned and well-traveled man; he spoke eight languages, was a mathematician and collected a valuable library. For astronomical studies, he built an observatory in his Landgraviate Castle in Butzbach and had some astronomical instruments made. In 1618, he appointed Daniel Mögling (alias Theophilus Schweighart), who was a Rosicrucian and medical doctor and a member of a family of professors from Tübingen, as a court mathematician and court astronomer. Mogling, who also translated Philip Sidney's Arcadia brought him into contact with Wilhelm Schickard (1592–1635), who had invented a calculating machine in 1623. Philip III also corresponded with the astronomers Kepler and Galileo. He had met the 17 years older Galileo during his two trips to Italy in 1602 and 1607. Kepler visited Butzabch twice, in July 1621 and in October 1627. Philip III and Kepler observed the size of sunspots together and in 1624, Philip printed Kepler's Chilias logarithmorum. Kepler's daughter Susan also visited the court at Butzbach several times.

Philip expanded his castle and surrounded it with a pleasure garden and a tree garden. Neither garden has survived. The largest attraction in the garden was the "planet fountain". Drawings of this fountain, a painting and a description have survived and a model was constructed recently.

Philip III died in 1643 during a sweating treatment at Bad Ems, which his physician Johann Schröder had prescribed a year earlier. During his treatment, some alcohol caught fire, due to carelessness of the barber. Philip III suffered severe burns and died from his wounds shortly afterwards.

Since both of his marriages had been childless, the Landgraviate of Butzbach fell back to Hesse-Darmstadt after just one generation. His second wife, Christina Sophia, remained on the castle in Butzbach until her death.

== Personal life ==
On 17 August 1572 Philip was married to Countess Anna Margarethe of Diepholz and Bronckhorst (1580-1629), daughter of Count Friedrich II zu Diepholz und Bronckhorst (1556-1585) and his wife, Countess Anastasia of Waldeck-Landau (1555-1582). She died childless in 1629 and was buried in the town church at Butzbach.

On 2 June 1632, he married his second wife, Countess Christina Sophia of Ostfriesland (1609-1658), daughter of Enno III, Count of East Frisia and his second wife, Princess Anna of Holstein-Gottorp. She died childless in Frankfurt in 1658.
