= Frederick Magnus =

Frederick Magnus may refer to:

- Frederick Magnus I, Count of Solms-Laubach (1521–1561)
- Frederick Magnus, Count of Erbach-Fürstenau (1575–1618), German prince
