= Sophia of Hanover =

Electress of Hanover from 1692 to 1698

Sophia
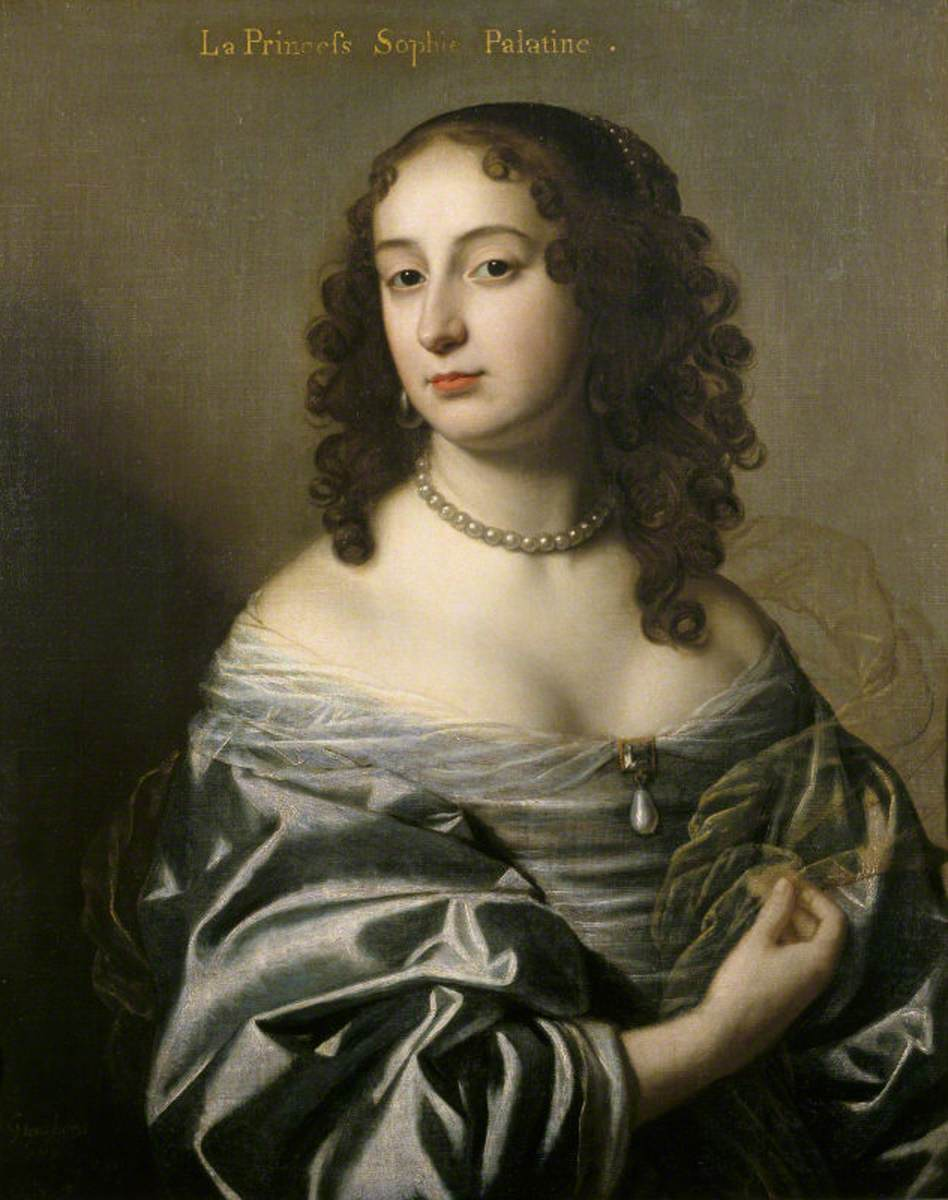
- Portrait by Gerard van Honthorst, 1650

Electress consort of Hanover
- Tenure: 19 December 1692 – 23 January 1698

Duchess consort of Brunswick-Lüneburg
- Tenure: 18 December 1679 – 23 January 1698
- Born: Princess Sophia of the Palatinate; 14 October 1630; The Hague, Dutch Republic
- Died: 8 June 1714 (aged 83); Herrenhausen Gardens, Hanover
- Burial: 9 June 1714; Leine Palace, Hanover; 1957; Herrenhausen Palace, Hanover
- Spouse: Ernest Augustus, Elector of Hanover (m. 1658; died 1698)
- Issue more...: George I of Great Britain; Prince Maximilian William of Brunswick-Lüneburg; Sophia Charlotte, Queen in Prussia; Prince Ernest Augustus, Duke of York and Albany
- House: Palatinate-Simmern (Cadet branch of Wittelsbach)
- Father: Frederick V, Elector Palatine
- Mother: Elizabeth Stuart

Sophia (German: Sophie, [zoˈfiː]; 14 October [O.S. 4 October] 1630 – 8 June [O.S. 28 May] 1714) was Electress of Hanover from 1692 to 1698 as the consort of Prince-Elector Ernest Augustus. She was later the heiress presumptive to the thrones of England (later Great Britain following the Act of Union with Scotland in 1707), and Ireland under the Act of Settlement 1701, as she was the granddaughter of King James VI and I. Sophia died less than two months before she would have become Queen of Great Britain and Ireland. Consequently, her son George succeeded her first cousin once removed, Queen Anne, to the British throne. The succession to the throne has since been composed entirely of, and legally defined as, Sophia's legitimate Protestant descendants.

Sophia was born in The Hague to Frederick V, formerly Elector Palatine and King of Bohemia, and Elizabeth Stuart, daughter of King James VI and I. She grew up in the Dutch Republic, where her family had sought refuge after the sequestration of their Electorate during the Thirty Years' War. During this time, the English Stuarts also went into exile and Sophia was courted by her cousin, Charles II of England.

Sophia instead married Prince Ernest Augustus, her third cousin, in 1658. Despite his temper and frequent absences, Sophia loved him and bore him seven children who survived to adulthood. Born a landless cadet, Ernest Augustus succeeded in having the House of Hanover raised to electoral dignity in 1692. As a result, Princess Sophia became Electress of Hanover, the title by which she is best remembered. A patron of the arts, Sophia commissioned Herrenhausen Palace and its gardens and sponsored philosophers, such as Gottfried Leibniz and John Toland.

== Early life ==
Sophia was born on 14 October 1630 at her family home, the Wassenaer Hof in The Hague, Dutch Republic. She was the twelfth child and fifth daughter of Frederick V of the Palatinate and Elizabeth Stuart, daughter of King James VI and I of Scotland and England. The couple were known as the 'Winter King and Queen', as they were forced to abdicate and flee Bohemia after ruling for only a year. Sophia's birth was overshadowed by the deaths of her siblings Frederick Henry and Charlotte. She was christened on 30 January 1631, three days after both siblings were laid to rest. As was custom, Sophia was granted an annuity of 40 thalers by the Estates of Friesland, and three noble ladies, also named Sophia, were appointed as her godmothers.

Sophia's father died when she was only two, and she was raised away from her mother in Leiden with her siblings. However, when her brother Gustavus died in 1641, the eleven-year-old Sophia was brought to join her mother and older sisters Henriette, Louise, and Elisabeth at the Hague. The girls' marriage prospects were significantly diminished due to their lack of dowries and the family's precarious political situation. However, in 1649, Sophia was courted by her cousin, Charles II of England, who was living in exile at the Hague during the Second English Civil War. Sophia rebuffed his advances, believing that he was attempting to use her to get money from her mother's supporter, Lord William Craven.

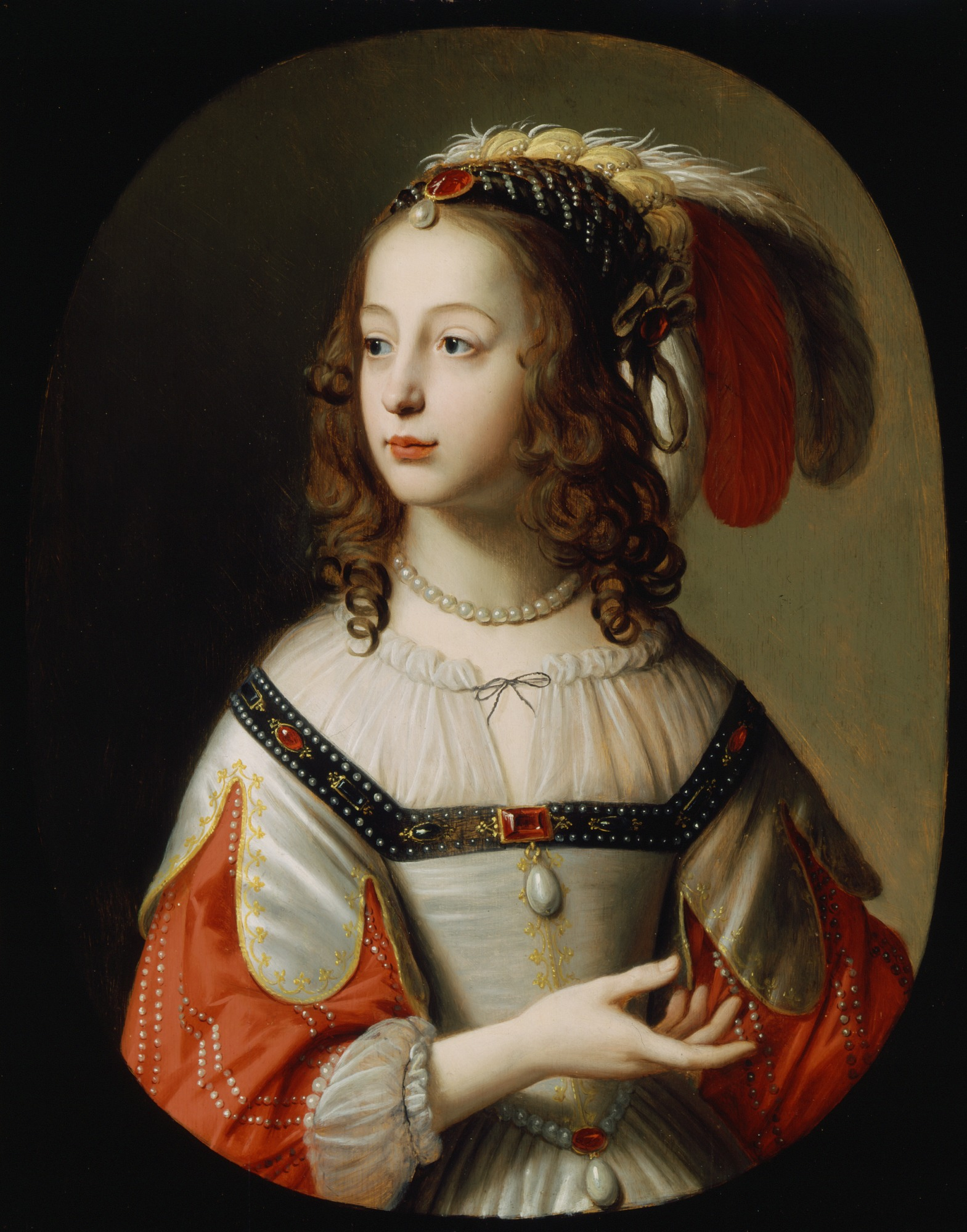
Portrait of Sophie, Princess Palatine, by Gerard van Honthorst c. 1641

In 1648, the Peace of Westphalia brought the 30 Years War to a close, and the Rhine Palatine was restored to Sophia's brother Charles. In 1650, Sophia left the Hague and settled with her brother and his wife Charlotte, whom she disliked, in Heidelberg. The same year, Sophia fell ill with smallpox, which she believed greatly diminished her beauty: pockmarked skin was another deterrent to potential suitors. However, the family continued to recover what had been lost in the war; Charles was confirmed as Arch-Treasurer of the Empire, and the family was given audience with the Emperor and Empress in early 1653.

In her twenties, Sophia began to receive marriage proposals, including from Adolf Johann of Zweibrüken, the brother of King Charles X Gustav of Sweden. Sophia's brother, Charles, was flattered by the proposal, and sent an envoy to negotiate with the Swedish king. However, when George William, Duke of Brunswick, and his brother Ernest Augustus came to inquire about Sophia's potential marriage, Charles instead signed a marriage contract between George and Sophia. George and Ernest then continued on to Venice, where the duke appeared to have second thoughts. George called off the marriage, and instead proposed that Sophia marry Ernest; in exchange, he would never marry, and upon his death, all his lands and property would go to the new couple. The new marriage contract was drawn up and signed on 5 June 1658.

Before her marriage, Sophia was styled as 'Sophie, Princess Palatine of the Rhine', or as 'Sophia of the Palatinate'. The Electors of the Palatinate were the Calvinist senior branch of House of Wittelsbach, whose Catholic branch ruled the Electorate of Bavaria.

== Marriage ==
On 30 September 1658, Sophia married Ernest Augustus, Duke of Brunswick-Lüneburg, at Heidelberg, who in 1692 became the first Elector of Hanover. Ernest Augustus was a second cousin of Sophia's mother Elizabeth Stuart, Queen of Bohemia, as they were both great-grandchildren of Christian III of Denmark.

Sophia became a friend and admirer of Gottfried Leibniz while he was librarian at the Court of Hanover. Their friendship lasted from 1676 until her death in 1714. This friendship resulted in a substantial correspondence, first published in the 19th century (Klopp 1973), that reveals Sophia's exceptional intellectual ability and curiosity. She was well-read in the works of René Descartes and Baruch Spinoza. Together with Ernest Augustus, she greatly improved the Herrenhausen Palace, and she guided the creation of the Herrenhausen Gardens surrounding the palace, where she died.

In 1680, during another long visit to Italy by her husband, Sophia wrote her memories of her first fifty years of life.

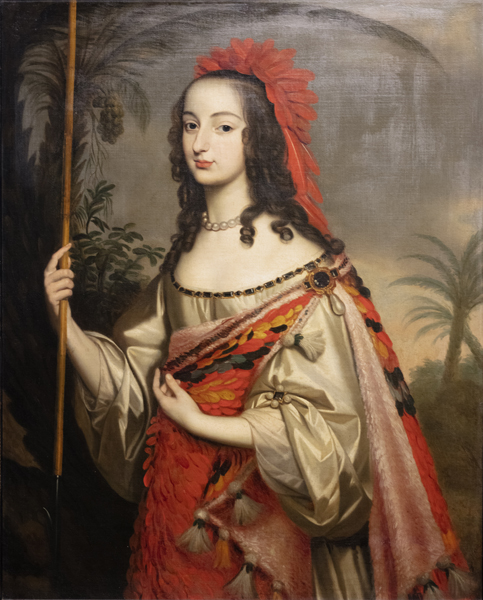
Sophia, dressed as an Indigenous Brazilian, wearing a Tupinambá cape. Painted c. 1644 by her sister, Louise Hollandine of the Palatinate

=== Letters ===
Sophia was renowned across Europe as a writer, placed among Madame de Sevigne and Cardinal de Retz as chroniclers of history in royal and princely courts.

Her sister Elisabeth of the Palatinate and brother Karl Ludwig died when she was about fifty years old, and she began writing her memoirs as therapy.

=== Issue ===
Sophia had ten children, of whom seven survived childbirth:

- George I, King of Great Britain and Ireland (7 June 1660 – 22 June 1727)
- Frederick Augustus (3 October 1661 – 10 June 1691), Imperial General
- Stillborn twin sons (February 1664)
- Maximilian William of Brunswick-Lüneburg (13 December 1666 – 27 June 1726), field marshal in the Imperial Army
- Stillborn son (13 December 1666)
- Sophia Charlotte (2 October 1668 – 21 January 1705), Queen in Prussia
- Charles Philip of Brunswick-Lüneburg (13 October 1669 – 1 January 1690), colonel in the Imperial Army
- Christian Henry of Brunswick-Lüneburg (29 September 1671 – 31 July 1703)
- Ernest Augustus of Brunswick-Lüneburg, Duke of York and Albany (7 September 1674 – 14 August 1728), became prince-bishop of Osnabrück

Three of her sons were killed in battle.

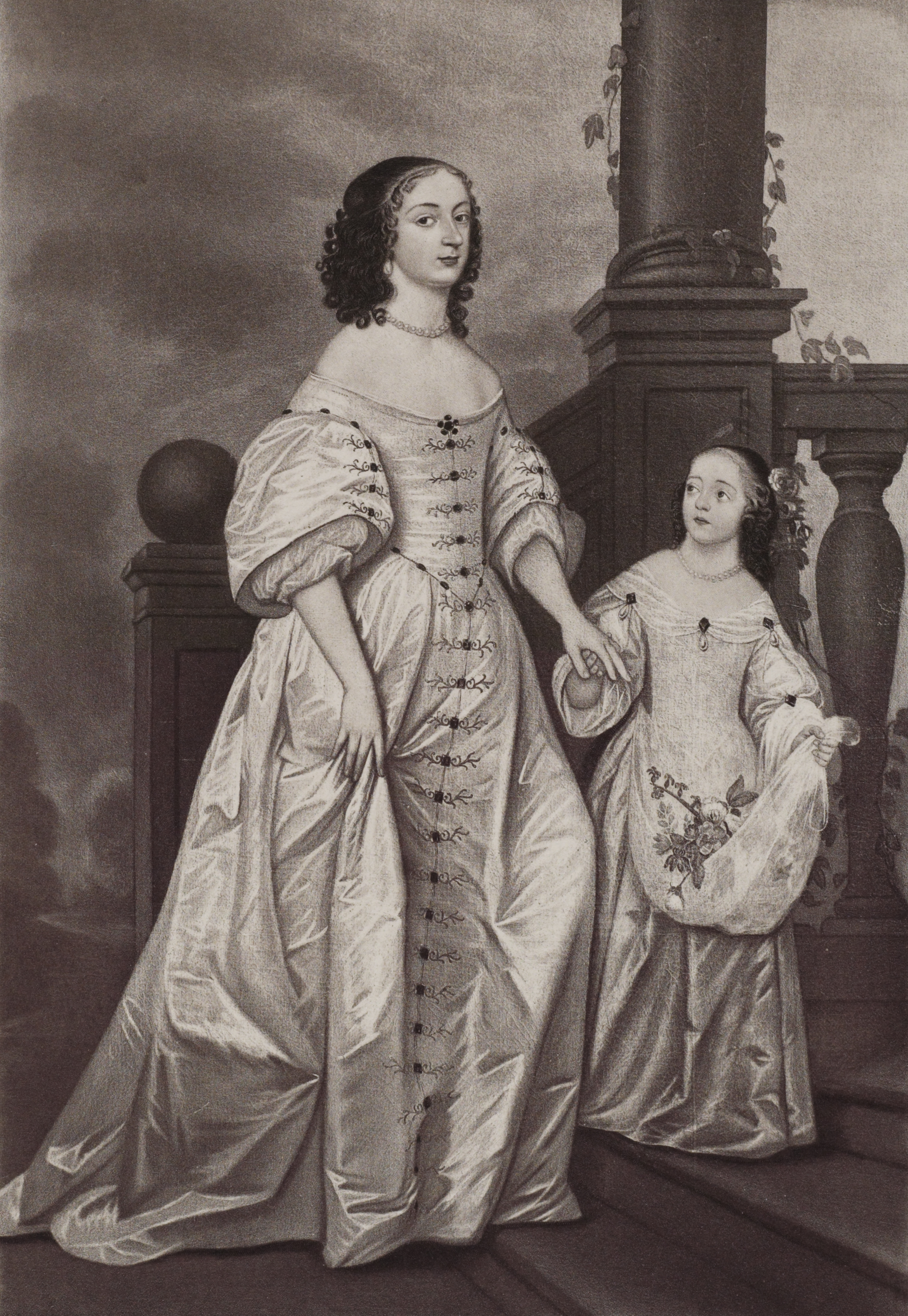
Electress Sophia and her daughter

Sophia was absent for almost a year, 1664–65, during a long holiday with Ernest Augustus in Italy. She corresponded regularly with her sons' governess and took a great interest in their upbringing, even more so on her return. After Sophia's tour, she bore Ernest Augustus another four sons and a daughter. In her letters, Sophia describes her eldest son as a responsible, conscientious child who set an example to his younger brothers and sisters.

Initially, she opposed the marriage of her son George and Sophia Dorothea of Celle, looking down on Sophia Dorothea's mother Éléonore Desmier d'Olbreuse (who was not of royal birth and to whom Sophia referred as "mouse dirt mixed among the pepper") and concerned by Sophia Dorothea's legitimated status, but was eventually won over by the marriage's financial advantages.

== Heiress presumptive ==
In September 1700, Sophia met her widowed cousin King William III at Het Loo Palace in Apeldoorn, Netherlands. This happened two months after the death of his nephew Prince William, Duke of Gloucester, son of Princess Anne of Denmark (the future Queen Anne). By this time, given the ailing William III's reluctance to remarry, the inclusion of Sophia in the line of succession was becoming more likely because she and her sons were Protestants. Her candidature was aided by the fact that she had grown up in the Netherlands close to William III and could converse fluently with him in his native Dutch.

A year after their meeting, the Parliament of England passed the Act of Settlement 1701, which declared that in the event of no legitimate issue from Anne or William III, the crowns of England and Ireland were to settle upon "the most excellent princess Sophia, electress and duchess-dowager of Hanover" and "the heirs of her body, being Protestant". Scotland being independent at the time, this did not mean she would also succeed Anne as queen of Scotland, which led to a succession crisis and eventually to the Treaty of Union between Scotland and England in 1706/07.

The key excerpt from the Act, naming Sophia as heir presumptive, reads:

Therefore for a further Provision of the Succession of the Crown in the Protestant Line We Your Majesties most dutifull and Loyall Subjects the Lords Spirituall and Lords Temporall and Commons in this present Parliament assembled do beseech Your Majesty that it may be enacted and declared and be it enacted and declared by the Kings most Excellent Majesty by and with the Advice and Consent of the Lords Spirituall and Temporall and Commons in this present Parliament assembled and by the Authority of the same That the most Excellent Princess Sophia Electress and Dutchess Dowager of Hannover Daughter of the most Excellent Princess Elizabeth late Queen of Bohemia Daughter of our late Sovereign Lord King James the First of happy Memory be and is hereby declared to be the next in Succession in the Protestant Line to the Imperiall Crown and Dignity of the forsaid Realms of England France and Ireland with the Dominions and Territories thereunto belonging after His Majesty and the Princess Anne of Denmark and in Default of Issue of the said Princess Anne and of His Majesty respectively.

Sophia was made next in line to cut off a claim by the Catholic James Francis Edward Stuart, who would have become James III and VIII, and to deny the throne to the many other Roman Catholics and spouses of Roman Catholics who held a claim. The act restricts the British throne to the "Protestant heirs" of Sophia of Hanover who had never been Roman Catholic, or married a Roman Catholic. In 1711, the General Assembly of the Church of Scotland recommended that its congregations pray regularly "for the Princess Sophia, Electoress and Duchess Dowager of Hanover, and the Protestant line in that family, upon whom the succession to the crown of these dominions is by law established".

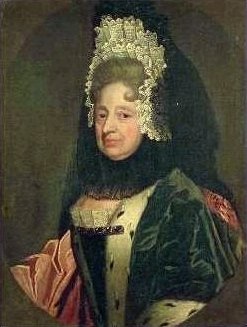
Sophia as dowager Electress of Hanover, around the time she was proclaimed heir presumptive of the British crown.

Some British politicians attempted several times to bring Sophia to England in order to enable her to assume government immediately in the event of Anne's death. It was argued that such a course was necessary to ensure Sophia's succession, for Anne's Roman Catholic half-brother was significantly closer to London than was Sophia. The Electress was eager to move to London, but the proposal was denied, as such action would mortally offend Anne, who was strongly opposed to a rival court in her kingdom. Anne might have realised that Sophia, who was active and lively despite her old age, could cut a better figure than herself. Sophia was completely uncertain of what would happen after Anne's death, saying: "What Parliament does one day, it undoes the next."

When the law was passed in mid-1701, Sophia at age 70, five of her children from ages 35 to 41, and three legitimate grandchildren from ages 14 to 18, were alive. Although Sophia was 35 years older than Anne, she was very fit and healthy, and invested time and energy in securing the succession either for herself or her son. There are more than 5,000 legitimate descendants of Sophia, although not all are in the line of succession. The Sophia Naturalization Act 1705 (4 & 5 Ann. c. 16) granted the right of English (not British, as the Kingdom of Great Britain was created in 1707) nationality to Sophia's non-Roman Catholic descendants; those who had obtained the right to British citizenship via this Act at any time before its repeal by the British Nationality Act 1948 retain this lawful right today.

== Death and legacy ==
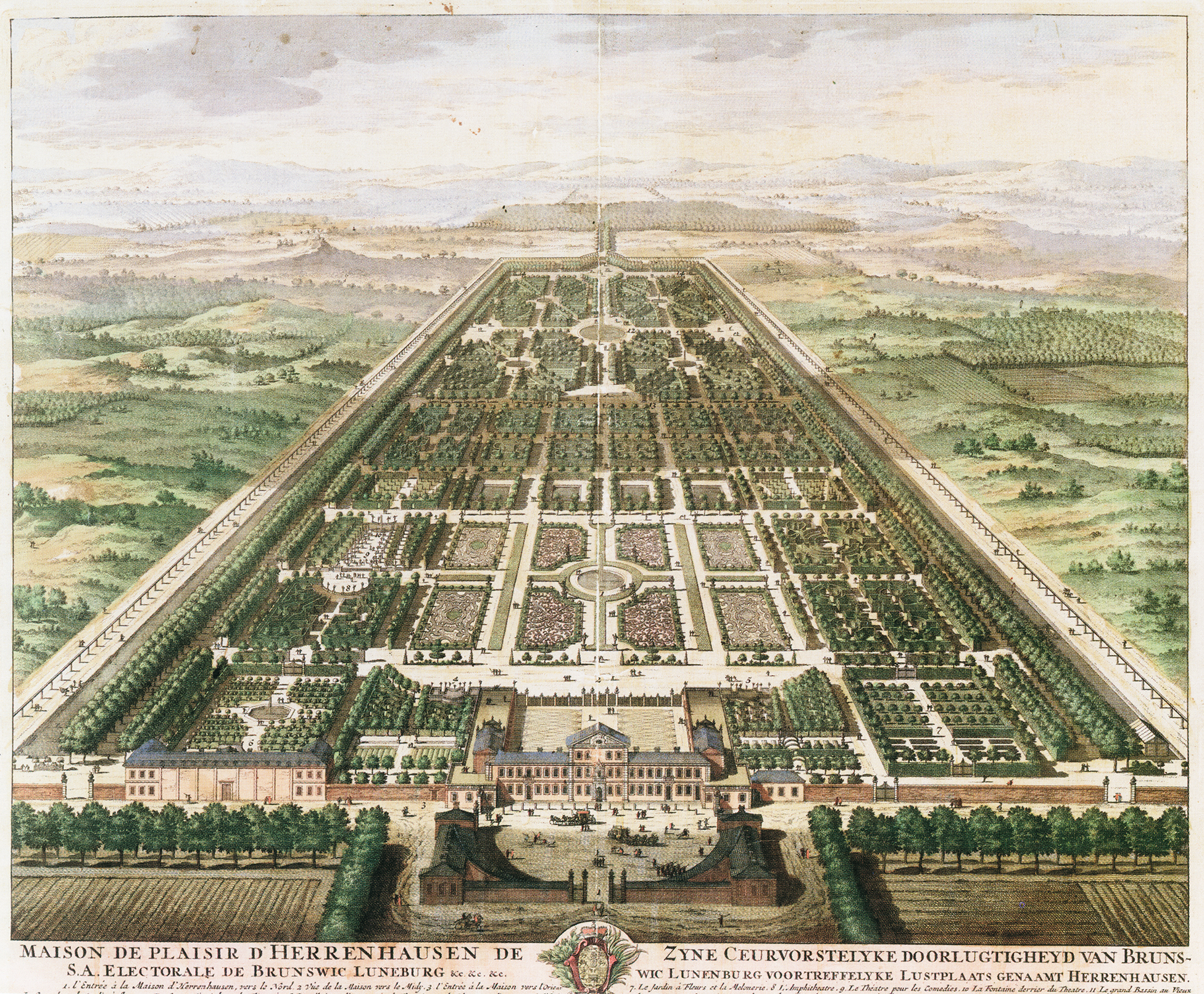
Summer Palace of Herrenhausen and the Great Garden, ca 1708

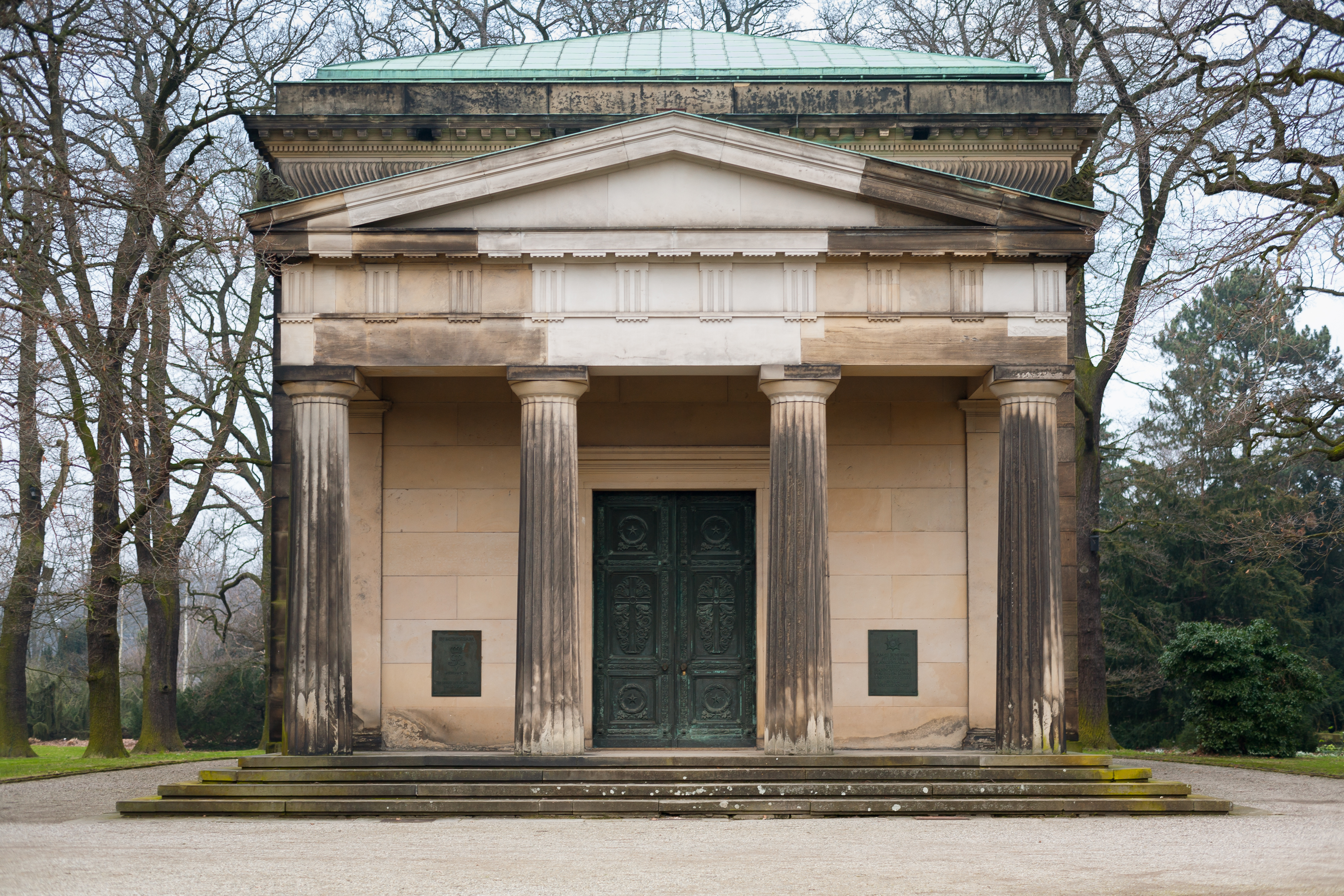
Mausoleum of King Ernest Augustus I in the Berggarten of Herrenhausen Gardens, into which the remains of Sophia were moved in 1957, from their original burial site in the chapel of Leine Palace, Hanover

Although considerably older than Queen Anne, Sophia enjoyed much better health. According to the Countess of Bückeburg in a letter to Sophia's niece, the Raugravine Luise, on 5 June 1714 Sophia felt ill after receiving an angry letter from Queen Anne. Three days later, on 8 June, she was walking in the Herrenhausen Gardens when she ran to shelter from a sudden downpour of rain and collapsed and died in the arms of her granddaughter-in-law Caroline of Ansbach, Electoral Princess of Hanover. Sophia was 83, a very advanced age for the era. Queen Anne died less than two months later on 1 August 1714 at the age of 49. Had Sophia survived Anne, she would have been the oldest person to ascend the British throne.

Upon Sophia's death, her eldest son Elector George Louis of Hanover (1660–1727) became heir presumptive in her place and within two months succeeded Anne as George I of Great Britain. Sophia's daughter Sophia Charlotte of Hanover (1668–1705) married Frederick I of Prussia, from whom the later Prussian and German monarchs descend.

Sophia was buried in the chapel of Leine Palace in Hanover, as were her husband and their son George I. After the destruction of the palace and its chapel during World War II by Allied aerial raids, their remains were moved into the mausoleum of King Ernest Augustus I in the Berggarten of Herrenhausen Gardens in 1957.

== Family ==
The British monarchs of the House of Stuart, their relations, and the transition to the Hanovers

James V 1512–1542 r. 1513–1542	Christian III of Denmark; 1503–1559
Mary, Queen of Scots; 1542–1587 r. 1542–1567	Frederick II of Denmark; 1534–1588	Dorothea of Denmark; 1546–1617
James VI and I 1566–1625 r. 1567/1603–1625	Anne of Denmark; 1574–1619	George, Duke of Brunswick-Calenberg; 1582–1641
Henrietta Maria of France; 1609–1669	Charles I 1600–1649 r. 1625–1649	Elizabeth Stuart, Queen of Bohemia; 1596–1662
HANOVER
Charles II; 1630–1685 r. 1660–1685	Mary, Princess Royal and Princess of Orange; 1631–1660	Anne Hyde; 1637–1671	James II and VII; 1633–1701 r. 1685–1688	Mary of Modena; 1658–1718	Sophia of Hanover; 1630–1714	Ernest Augustus, Elector of Hanover; 1629–1698
James Scott, Duke of Monmouth (illegitimate); 1649–1685	William III; 1650–1702 r. 1689–1702	Mary II; 1662–1694 r. 1689–1694	Anne; 1665–1714 r. 1702–1714	James Francis Edward Stuart "the Old Pretender"; 1688–1766	Louisa Maria Stuart; 1692–1712	George I 1660–1727 r. 1714–1727
(no children)	Prince William, Duke of Gloucester; 1689–1700	Charles Edward Stuart "the Young Pretender"; 1720–1788	Henry Benedict Stuart "Cardinal Duke of York"; 1725–1807	George II; 1683–1760 r. 1727–1760

== Works ==
- Memoirs of Sophia, Electress of Hanover, 1630–1680. Translated by Forester, H. London: Richard Bentley & Son. 1888. LCCN 04027109 – via HathiTrust.

German nobility
Preceded by Benedicta Henrietta of the Palatinate	Duchess consort of Brunswick-Lüneburg; 1679–1698; Served alongside: Éléonore Desmier d'Olbreuse	Vacant Title next held by Caroline of Ansbach
New title	Electress consort of Hanover; 1692–1698	Vacant Title next held by Caroline of Ansbach
