= Bernardine of Lippe =

German noblewoman

- Born: 14 October 1563
- Died: 25 August 1628 (aged 64); Oberbronn
- Noble family: Lippe
- Spouse: Louis, Count of Leiningen-Westerburg
- Father: Bernhard VIII, Count of Lippe
- Mother: Catherine of Waldeck-Eisenberg

Bernardine of Lippe (1563–1628) was a Countess of Lippe by birth and by marriage Countess of Leiningen-Leiningen.

== Background ==
She was a daughter of Count Bernhard VIII of Lippe (1527–1563) from his marriage with Catherine (1524–1583), the daughter of Count Philip III of Waldeck-Eisenberg.

== Marriage and issue ==
In September 1578, she married Count Louis of Leiningen-Westerburg (1557–1622). She had nine children:

1. George Philip (1579–1589).
2. Amalie (1581–1582).
3. Ursula Maria (1583–1638), married in 1606 to Maximilian Marschall of Pappenheim.
4. Simon (1584–1585).
5. Amalie (1586–1604).
6. John Casimir (1587–1635), Count of Leiningen-Leiningen, married in 1617 to Martha of Hohenlohe-Weikersheim (1575–1638).
7. Anastasia (1583–1638), married in 1624 to Count Konrad Wilhelm of Tübingen.
8. Philip II (1591–1668), Count of Leiningen-Rixingen, married in 1618 to Agathe Catherine Schenk of Limpurg (1595–1664).
9. Louis Emich (1591–1668), Count of Leiningen-Oberbronn, married in 1624 to Esther of Eberstein (1603–1682).
