= Louis, Count of Leiningen-Westerburg =

- Born: 1557
- Died: 1622 (aged 64–65)
- Buried: Oberbronn
- Noble family: Leiningen
- Spouse: Bernardine of Lippe
- Father: Philip I of Leiningen-Westerburg
- Mother: Amelia of Zweibrücken-Bitsch

Louis, Count Leiningen-Westerburg (1557–1622) was a German nobleman. He was a member of the House of Leiningen and was the ruling count of Leiningen-Leiningen from 1597 until his death.

He was the eldest son of Philip I (1527–1597), and his first wife Amelia of Zweibrücken-Bitsch (1537–1577), a daughter of Count Simon V of Zweibrücken-Bitsch (d. 1540). His father was descended from the noble Leiningen-Westerburg family. House of Westerburg is a cadet branch of the House of Runkel. The County of Leiningen-Westerburg had been divided between Philip I and his brothers, and Philip I had founded the Leiningen-Leiningen line. By marrying Amelia, he had expanded his territory with her inheritance, the imperial county of Rixingen. Louis inherited this territory when his father died in 1597.

In 1578, he married Bernardine of Lippe (1563–1628), a daughter of Count Bernhard VIII, Count of Lippe of Lippe. Louis and Bernardine had nine children:

1. George Philip (1579–1589).
2. Amalie (1581–1582).
3. Ursula Maria (1583–1638), married in 1606 to Maximilian Marschall of Pappenheim.
4. Simon (1584–1585).
5. Amalie (1586–1604).
6. John Casimir (1587–1635), Count of Leiningen-Leiningen, married in 1617 to Martha of Hohenlohe-Weikersheim (1575–1638).
7. Anastasia (1583–1638), married in 1624 to Count Konrad Wilhelm of Tübingen.
8. Philip II (1591–1668), Count of Leiningen-Rixingen, married in 1618 to Agathe Catherine Schenk of Limpurg (1595–1664).
9. Louis Emich (1591–1668), Count of Leiningen-Oberbronn, married in 1624 to Esther of Eberstein (1603–1682).

Louis died in 1622 and was buried in Oberbronn. His two eldest surviving sons divided his territory. Philip II, the youngest son, received the Imperial County of Rixingen, where he founded the Leiningen-Rixingen line. His elder brother John Casimir received the lands Louis had inherited from his father, and continued the Leiningen-Leiningen line.

Louis, Count of Leiningen-Westerburg House of Leiningen Born: 1557 Died: 1622
Preceded by Philip I	Count of Leiningen-Leiningen; 1597-1622	Succeeded by John Casimir
Preceded by Philip I	Count of Leiningen-Leiningen; 1597-1622	Succeeded by Philip II as Count of Leiningen-Rixingen
