= Simon V of Lippe =

Simon V, Count of Lippe
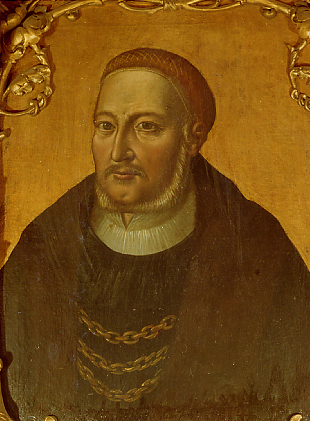
- Born: 1471
- Died: 1536 (aged 64–65)
- Noble family: House of Lippe
- Spouses: Walpurgis of Bronckhorst; Magdalene of Mansfeld-Mittelort
- Issue Detail: Bernhard VIII, Count of Lippe
- Father: Bernard VII, Lord of Lippe
- Mother: Anna of Holstein-Pinneberg

Count Simon V of Lippe (1471 – September 17, 1536) was Noble Lord of Lippe, and from 1528 Count of Lippe. During his reign, the Reformation was introduced in Lippe.

== Life ==
Simon V was the fifth child and eldest son of Bernard VII "the Bellicose" and Anna of Holstein-Pinneberg and inherited Lippe after his father's death, around 1511. In 1528, he was raised to Imperial Count and Lippe became one of about 140 Imperial Counties.

Since 1518, the Reformation had prevailed, first in Lemgo and then in other cities in Lippe. An open conflict arose in 1530 when Protestant hymns were sung during a Catholic Easter Mass. Simon, who remained a Catholic all his life, was outraged, and spoke of insurgent farmers who refuse to endure any authority over themselves. He was, however, a vassal of two liege lords: the Bishop of Paderborn and Philip I, Landgrave of Hesse, who had been a Lutheran since 1524. This limited his freedom to act. The cities in Lippe, in particular Lippstadt and Lemgo, also favoured a closer relationship with the Lutheran faith. Philip of Hesse urged the citizens of Lemgo to redress their dispute with Simon V; nevertheless, Lutheranism continued to spread in the cities. When in 1533, Simon sought support for military action against Lemgo, Philip intervened and mediated. Later that year, Lemgo adopted the Church Order and thus officially became Lutheran.

In 1535, Simon V and Duke John III of Cleves invaded Lippstadt, which had turned Protestant. The city surrendered to its liege lord. The citizens of Lemgo were afraid that Simon V and John III would invade Lemgo as well, however, due to Philip's ongoing mediation, this did not happen.

== Marriage and issue ==
Simon V married Countess Walpurgis of Bronckhorst (died: 21 December 1522). With her, he had a son:

- Gisbert of Lippe (d. 1522)

Simon then married Magdalene of Mansfeld-Mittelort (born: c. 1500) and had five more children:

- Margaret of Lippe (1525–1578)
- Bernhard VIII, Count of Lippe
- Herman Simon, Count of Sternberg, married Ursula of Pyrmont and Spiegelberg (d. 1576)
- Anna of Lippe, married Count John I of Waldeck-Landau (born: 1521 or 1522)
- Agnes of Lippe (born: 1535), married Dietrich of Plesse

Simon V of Lippe House of Lippe Born: 1471 Died: 1536
Preceded by Bernard VII	Lord of Lippe; From 1528, Count of Lippe; 1511–1536	Succeeded by Bernhard VIII
