= Ernest Augustus, Duke of York and Albany =

Ernest Augustus
- Duke of York and Albany
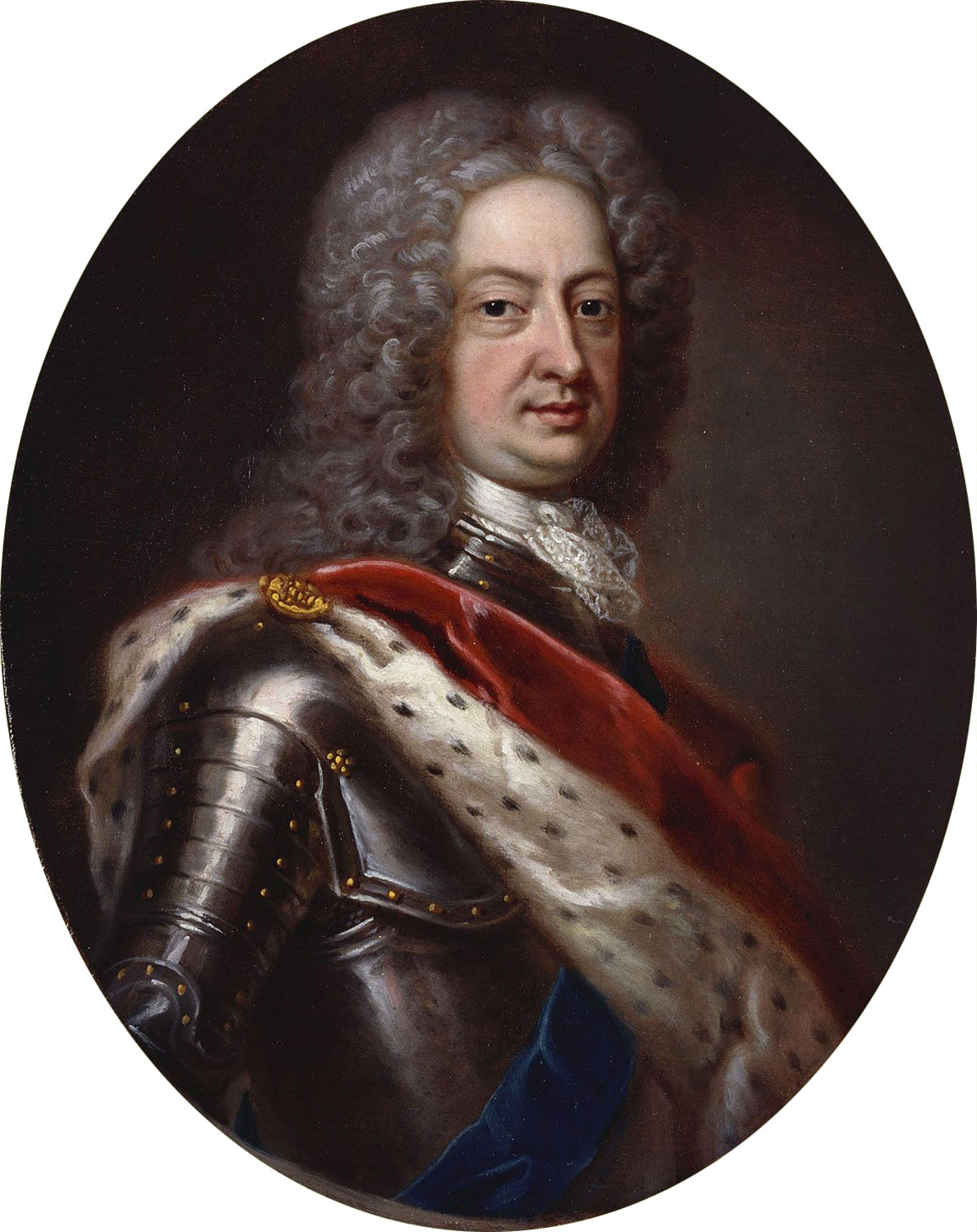
- Born: 17 September 1674; Osnabrück, Germany
- Died: 14 August 1728 (aged 53); Osnabrück, Germany
- House: Hanover
- Father: Ernest Augustus, Elector of Brunswick-Lüneburg
- Mother: Sophia of the Palatinate

Ernest Augustus, Duke of York and Albany (17 September 1674 – 14 August 1728), was the younger brother of George I of Great Britain. Ernest Augustus was a soldier and served with some distinction under Emperor Leopold I during the Nine Years' War and the War of the Spanish Succession. In 1715, he became Prince-Bishop of Osnabrück.

== Early life ==
Ernest Augustus was born on 17 September 1674. He was the sixth son and seventh child of Ernest Augustus, Elector of Brunswick-Lüneburg, and Sophia of the Palatinate, and the youngest brother of the future George I of Great Britain.

Ernest Augustus's father was Prince-Bishop of Osnabrück, and the first five years of his life were spent in Osnabrück, until his father became Duke of Brunswick-Lüneburg and the family moved to Hanover.

His education followed the customs of the time, by which German princes were expected to travel to foreign courts to make contacts and learn how to conduct diplomatic relations. In summer 1687, he visited the French court at Versailles via Amsterdam. While there, the two brothers were popular with the French royal family.

== Military career ==
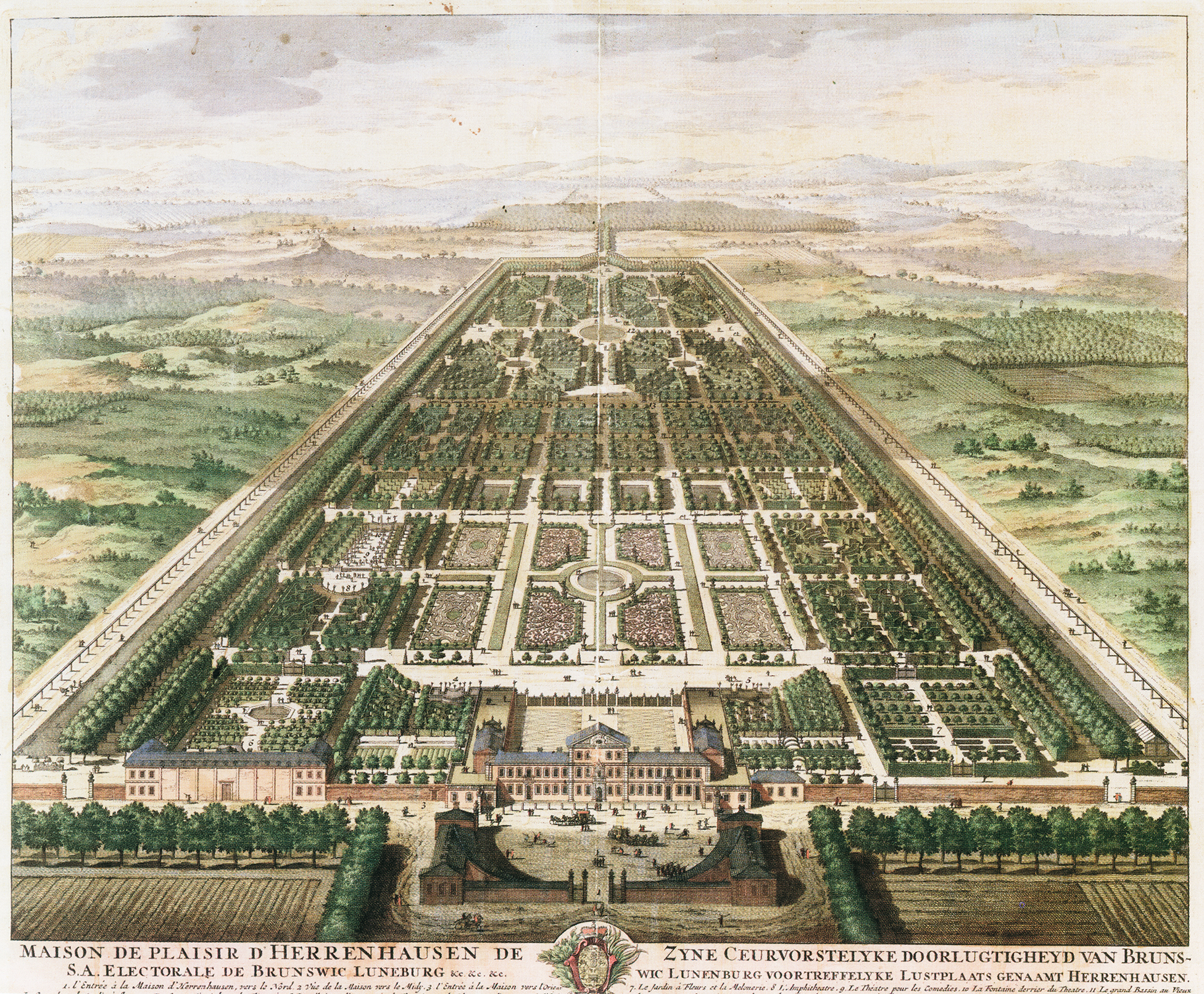
Herrenhausen palace and gardens, Hanover

After his visit to France, he trod the well-worn path for young German princes of those times and served as a soldier. His family interests were aligned with those of Emperor Leopold I and so he fought against the French in the Nine Years' War and was present at the Battle of Neerwinden in 1693. He continued his military career during the War of Spanish Succession and was actively engaged in the Siege of Lille (1708).

== Dynastic role ==
After his father's death, his eldest brother George inherited all his lands and titles, including the electorate. His father, as part of the conditions he had to fulfil to acquire an electorship, had adopted primogeniture, thus disinheriting younger sons. Unlike his four elder brothers, Ernest Augustus did not oppose this change; consequently he got on well with George, who trusted him.

Ernest Augustus was a prominent member of his brother's court at Herrenhausen, in Hanover, receiving diplomatic visitors and taking an active role in the cultural interests of the court. His influence may have helped secure the position of Kapellmeister for Handel at court.

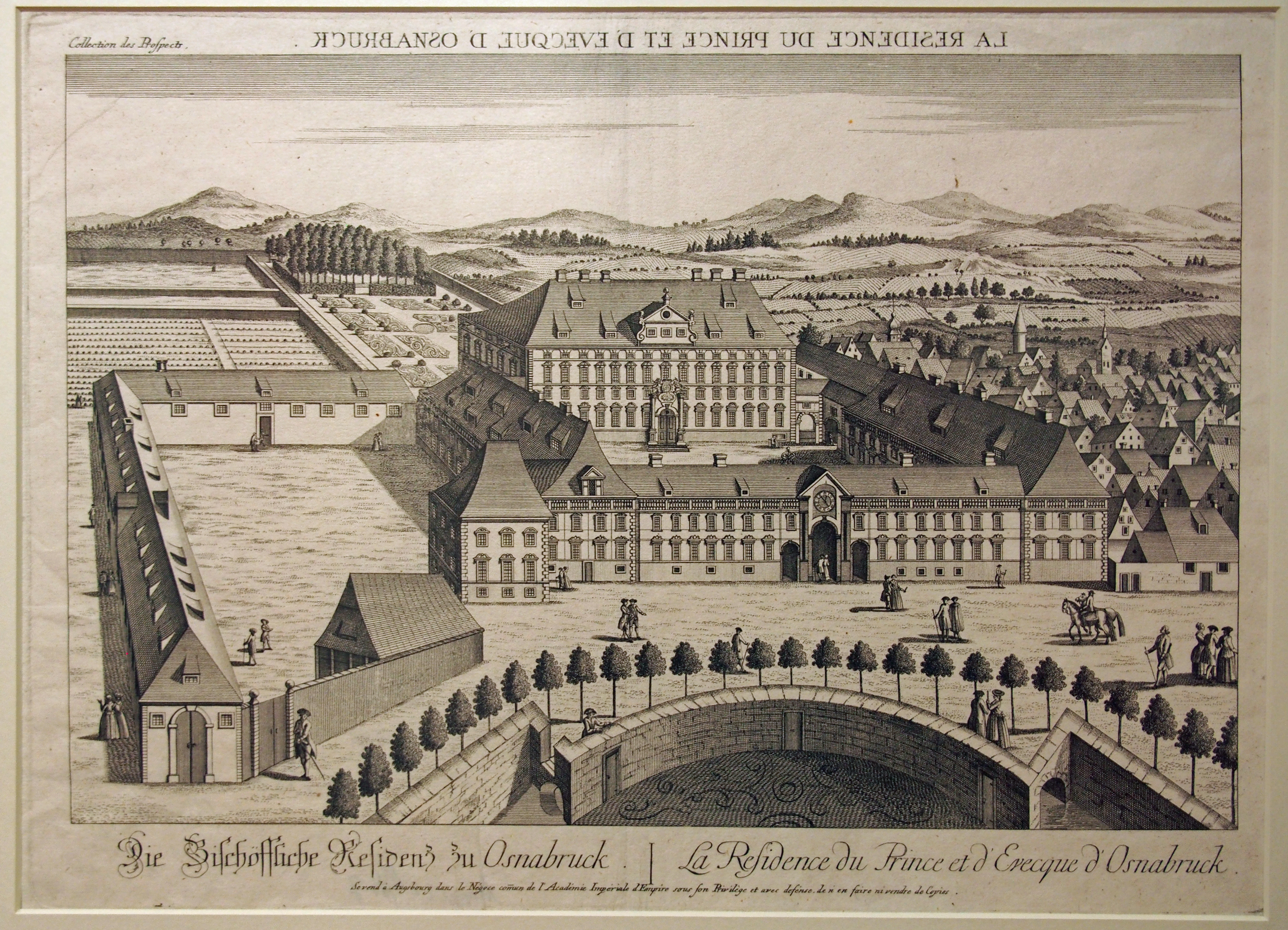
The Bishop's Palace at Osnabrück (after 1777)

With his accession to the British throne, George moved to London and Ernest Augustus took on the mantle of the senior head of the family in Brunswick-Lüneburg. In this capacity, he became regent in all but name, and took on the duty of care for George's seven-year-old grandson, Frederick Lewis, the future Prince of Wales and father-to-be of George III. Frederick was left in Germany as a diplomatic move, to reassure the populace and any ambitious neighbouring states of the family's continuing commitment to its German lands.

== Prince Bishop ==
Upon the death of Charles Joseph, Elector of Trier, in 1715, under the terms of the 1648 Treaty of Westphalia, it was the turn of a Protestant to become Prince-Bishop of Osnabrück. This position—as a Prince of the Holy Roman Empire and ruler of an independent principality—had to alternate between Catholics and Lutherans according to the treaty. Usually a member of the House of Welf held the office whenever the turn came to Protestants. As Ernest Augustus's elder brother Maximilian William of Brunswick-Luneburg had become a Catholic, King George nominated Ernest Augustus to be elected by the Osnabrück cathedral chapter. The position was not just an honorific, and so Ernest Augustus had to divide his time between his duties at Schloss Osnabrück and his role at the court in Herrenhausen.

In 1716, Ernst visited England where, on 29 June 1716, he was created Duke of York and Albany, and Earl of Ulster. On 30 April 1718 (OS), he was created a Knight of the Garter together with his grand-nephew Frederick, later Prince of Wales.

== Death ==
After his sojourn in Great Britain, Ernest Augustus returned to his previous life and continued to divide his time between Schloss Osnabrück and the court at Herrenhausen, while actively managing the affairs of both states. He died in Osnabrück on 14 August 1728 (NS), aged 53, and was buried there. One year earlier his brother George I had also died there on a journey. Believed to be homosexual, Ernest Augustus never married. Upon his death, his British and Irish peerages became extinct.

== Arms ==
Coat of arms of Ernest Augustus, Duke of York and Albany
Adopted 1716 Coronet Coronet of a Child of the Sovereign Crest Coronet of a child of the Sovereign thereon a Lion statant guardant Or, langued Gules, crowned with the same coronet charged on the shoulder with a label as in the arms. Escutcheon Quarterly: 1st, Gules, three Lions passant guardant in pale Or, armed and langued Azure (England); Impaled with Or, a Lion rampant Gules within a Double-Tressure flory counter-flory Gules, armed and langued Azure (Scotland); 2nd, Azure, three Fleurs-de-lis Or (France); 3rd, Azure, a Harp Or stringed Argent (Ireland); 4th, tiercé reversed, i, Gules, two Lions passant Or, armed and langued Azure (Brunswick); ii, Or, semée of Hearts Gules, a Lion rampant Azure, armed and langued Gules (Lüneburg); iii, Gules, a Horse courant Argent (Westphalia), over all an Inescutcheon Argent, charged with a Wheel Gules (Osnabrück); the whole differenced by a label of three-points Argent, each point charged with three Hearts Gules. Supporters Dexter: a Lion rampant guardant Or, armed and langued Gules, with a coronet of rank Or, charged on the shoulder with a label for difference as in the arms. Sinister: a Unicorn Argent, armed, crined and unguled Or, langued Gules, gorged with a Coronet of rank, a chain affixed thereto passing between the forelegs and reflexed over the back Or, charged on the shoulder with a label for difference as in the arms. Orders Order of the Garter circlet (Appointed 3 July 1716)

== Notes ==
Ernest Augustus, Duke of York and Albany House of Hanover Cadet branch of the House of Welf Born: 7 September 1674 Died: 14 August 1728
Regnal titles
Preceded by Charles Joseph	Prince-Bishop of Osnabrück; 1715–1728	Succeeded by Clemens August
