= Charles Joseph of Lorraine =

German prelate

- Archbishop of Trier
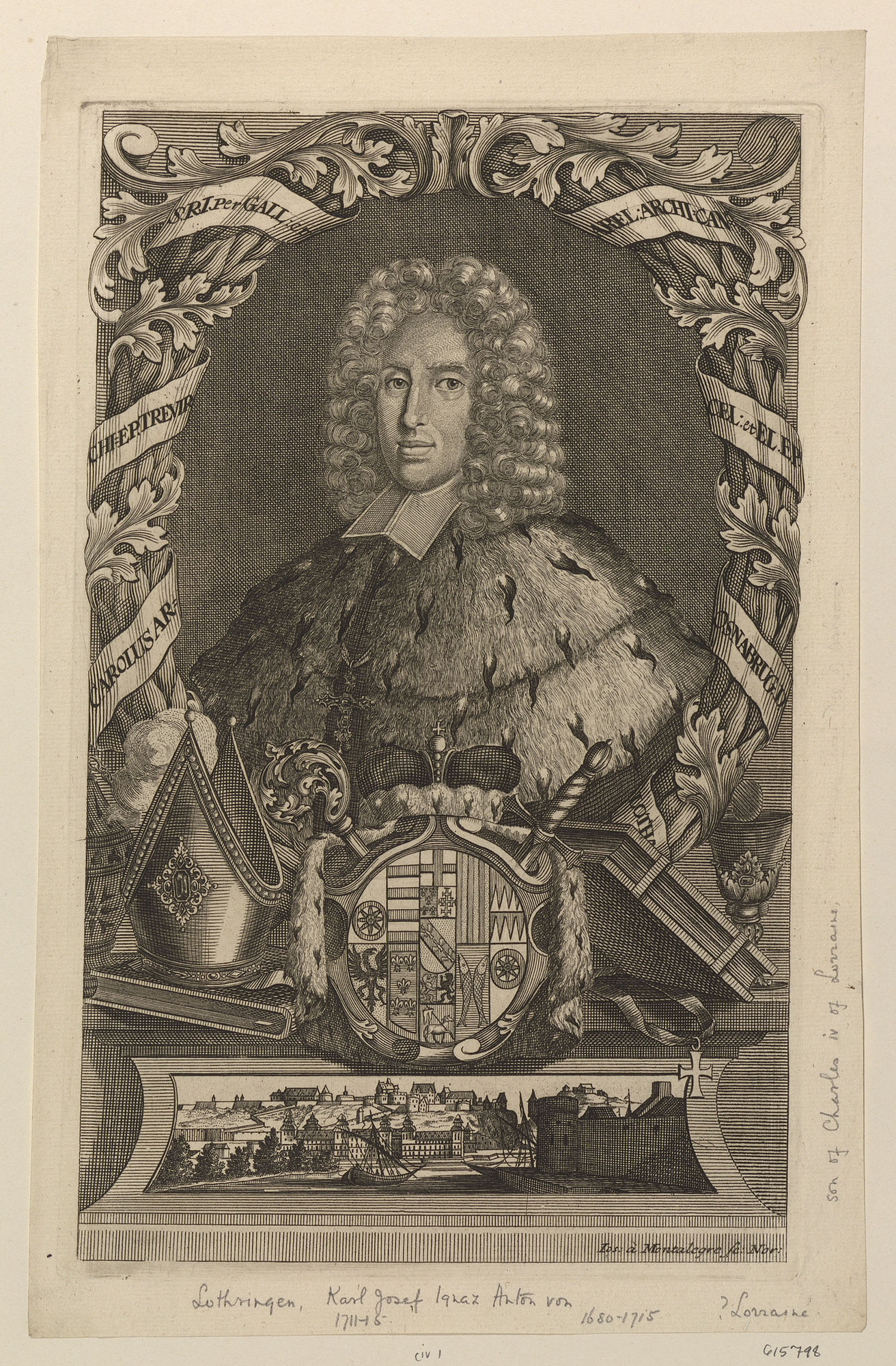
- Church: Catholic Church
- Diocese: Electorate of Trier
- In office: 1711–1715

Personal details
- Born: 24 November 1680
- Died: 4 December 1715 (aged 35)

Charles Joseph John Anthony Ignace Felix of Lorraine (German: Karl Joseph Anton Johann Ignaz Felix von Lothringen), also known as Charles III in his capacity as the bishop of Olomouc (24 November 1680 – 4 December 1715), was a German prelate.

Born in Vienna, he was the second son of Charles V, Duke of Lorraine. He was bishop of Olomouc (1695–1711) and Prince-Bishop of Osnabrück (1698–1715), for which he was the successful candidate of the House of Palatinate, opposed by Brandenburg and, following some reverses and to the accompaniment of an enormous payment to the chapter of Trier, Charles Joseph was made archbishop and prince-elector of Trier (1711–1715), a political position of notable importance in the Holy Roman Empire. Already in 1711, he was able to make use of his electoral rights in the election of Charles VI, Holy Roman Emperor. He participated in the negotiations surrounding the end of the War of the Spanish Succession and succeeded in having the French occupying forces leave the Archbishopric in 1714.

Charles Joseph died of smallpox while visiting Vienna.

== Bibliography ==
- Alessandro Cont, La Chiesa dei principi. Le relazioni tra Reichskirche, dinastie sovrane tedesche e stati italiani (1688–1763), preface of Elisabeth Garms-Cornides, Trento, Provincia autonoma di Trento, 2018, pp. 117-137

Charles Joseph of Lorraine House of Lorraine Born: 24 November 1680 in Vienna Died: 4 December 1715 in Vienna
Catholic Church titles
Regnal titles
Preceded by Charles II	Prince-Bishop of Olomouc as Charles III; 1695–1711	Succeeded by Wolfgang Schrattenbach
Preceded by Ernest Augustus I, Elector of Hanover (Lutheran Administrator)	Prince-Bishop of Osnabrück; 1698–1715	Succeeded by Ernest Augustus II, Prince of Hanover (Lutheran Administrator)
Preceded by John VIII	Archbishop- Elector of Trier and Prince-Abbot of Prüm as Charles III; 1711–1715	Succeeded by Francis Louis of Palatinate-Neuburg
