= Magdalena of Lippe =

German noblewoman (1552–1587)

- Born: 25 February 1552; Detmold, County of Lippe, Holy Roman Empire
- Died: 26 February 1587 (aged 35); Darmstadt, Landgraviate of Hesse-Darmstadt, Holy Roman Empire
- Spouse: George I, Landgrave of Hesse-Darmstadt (m. 1572)
- Issue: Louis V, Landgrave of Hesse-Darmstadt; Christine, Countess of Erbach-Fürstenau; Elisabeth, Countess of Nassau-Weilburg-Gleiberg; Philip III, Landgrave of Hesse-Butzbach; Anna, Countess Albert Otto of Solms-Laubach; Frederick I, Landgrave of Hesse-Homburg
- House: Lippe (birth); Hesse-Darmstadt (by marriage)
- Father: Bernhard VIII, Count of Lippe
- Mother: Catherine of Waldeck-Eisenberg

Magdalena of Lippe (25 February 1552, Detmold – 26 February 1587, Darmstadt) was a German noblewoman. She was a Countess of Lippe by birth. By her marriage to George I, Landgrave of Hesse-Darmstadt, she was the first Landgravine of Hesse-Darmstadt.

== Life ==
Magdalena was the daughter of Count Bernhard VIII of Lippe (1527–1563) from his marriage to Catherine (1524–1583), daughter of Count Philip III of Waldeck-Eisenberg. After her father's death, she moved to the court of Landgrave William IV of Hesse-Kassel, where she was regarded as a natural beauty. Here, she met George. She married him on 17 August 1572. William paid the expenses of the marriage. The marriage was a happy one. Magdalena was regarded as so virtuous, pious and benevolent, that she was sometimes compared to Saint Elisabeth. She even wrote a prayer book for her children. Magdalena and her husband laid the groundwork for the State and University library of Hesse.

She died in 1587, after 15 years of marriage, at the age of 35 from complications during the birth of her last child. She was buried in the choir of the city church of Darmstadt. Her famous epitaph can still be found behind the high altar. It was dedicated to her by her husband in 1589.

== Issue ==
Magdalena and George had ten children, of whom three sons and three daughters reached adulthood:

- Philip William (1576–1576), Hereditary prince
- Louis V (1577–1626), Landgrave of Hesse-Darmstadt

married in 1598 princess Magdalene of Brandenburg (1582–1616)

- Christine (1578–1596)

married in 1595 Count Frederick Magnus of Erbach-Fürstenau (1575–1618)

- Elisabeth (1579–1655)

married in 1601 Count John Casimir of Nassau-Weilburg-Gleiberg (1577–1602)

- Marie Hedwig (1580–1582)
- Philip III (1581–1643), Landgrave of Hesse-Butzbach

married firstly, in 1610, Countess Anna Margarethe of Diepholz (1580–1629)
married secondly, in 1632, Countess Christine Sophie of East Frisia (1609–1658)

- Anna (1583–1631)

married in 1601 Count Albert Otto of Solms-Laubach (1576–1610)

- Frederick I (1585–1638), Landgrave of Hesse-Homburg

married in 1622 Countess Margarethe of Leiningen-Westerburg (1604–1667)

- Magdalene (1586–1586)
- John (1587–1587)
