= Bernhard VIII of Lippe =

Count of Lippe (1527–1563)

Bernhard VIII, Count of Lippe
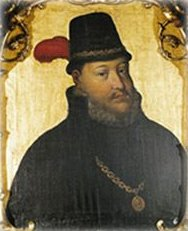
- Bernhard VIII, Count of Lippe
- Born: 6 December 1527; Detmold
- Died: 15 April 1563 (aged 35); Detmold
- Noble family: Lippe
- Spouse: Catherine of Waldeck-Eisenberg
- Issue: Anna; Magdalene; Simon VI; Bernhardine
- Father: Simon V, Count of Lippe
- Mother: Countess Magdalene of Mansfeld-Mittelort

Bernhard VIII, Count of Lippe (6 December 1527 in Detmold – 15 April 1563 in Detmold) was from 1547 until his death in 1563 ruling the County of Lippe.

== Life ==
Bernard's father, the reigning Count Simon V of Lippe, died in 1536, when Bernard was eight years old. Since he was too young to take over at this age, the country was ruled by a regency council consisting of Landgrave Philip I of Hesse, Count Adolph of Schaumburg and Count Jobst II of Hoya. Bernhard was raised in the Lutheran faith.

In 1546 he joined the government of the county of Lippe. During his reign, he tried especially to strengthen the Lutheran faith in his county. This met with the disapproval of the Emperor Charles V, whose troops occupied Lippe in the course of the Schmalkaldic War (1546–1547) and, after the defeat of the Protestant side in 1548, began implementing the Augsburg Interim. As a result, Lippe became an imperial fief.

In 1555, Bernard visited the Diet of Augsburg in person, and in 1556, he convened a meeting of the Protestant clergy in his county. In 1556, he declared war on Count John II of Rietberg. Bernard besieged John's court in 1557. In 1559, Bernhard gave Sternberg Castle to his brother Herman Simon as a Paréage. This triggered an inheritance dispute with the County of Schaumburg.

== Marriage and issue ==
His marriage to Catherine (1524–1583), daughter of the Count Philip III of Waldeck-Eisenberg produced the following children:

- Anna (1551–1614)

married in 1576 to Count Wolfgang II of Everstein-Massow (1528-1592)

- Magdalene (1552–1587)

married in 1572 to Landgrave George I of Hesse-Darmstadt (1547–1596)

- Simon VI of Lippe-Brake (1554–1613).

married in 1578, to Countess Armgard of Rietberg-Arnsberg (1551–1584)
married in 1585, to Countess Elisabeth of Holstein-Schauenburg (1566-1638)

- Bernhardine (1563–1628)

married in 1578 to Count Louis of Leiningen-Leiningen (1577-1622)

Bernhard VIII of Lippe House of Lippe Born: 6 December 1527 Died: 15 April 1563
Preceded by Simon V	Count of Lippe; 1536–1563	Succeeded by Simon VI
