= Frederick Magnus, Count of Erbach-Fürstenau =

German prince (1575–1618)

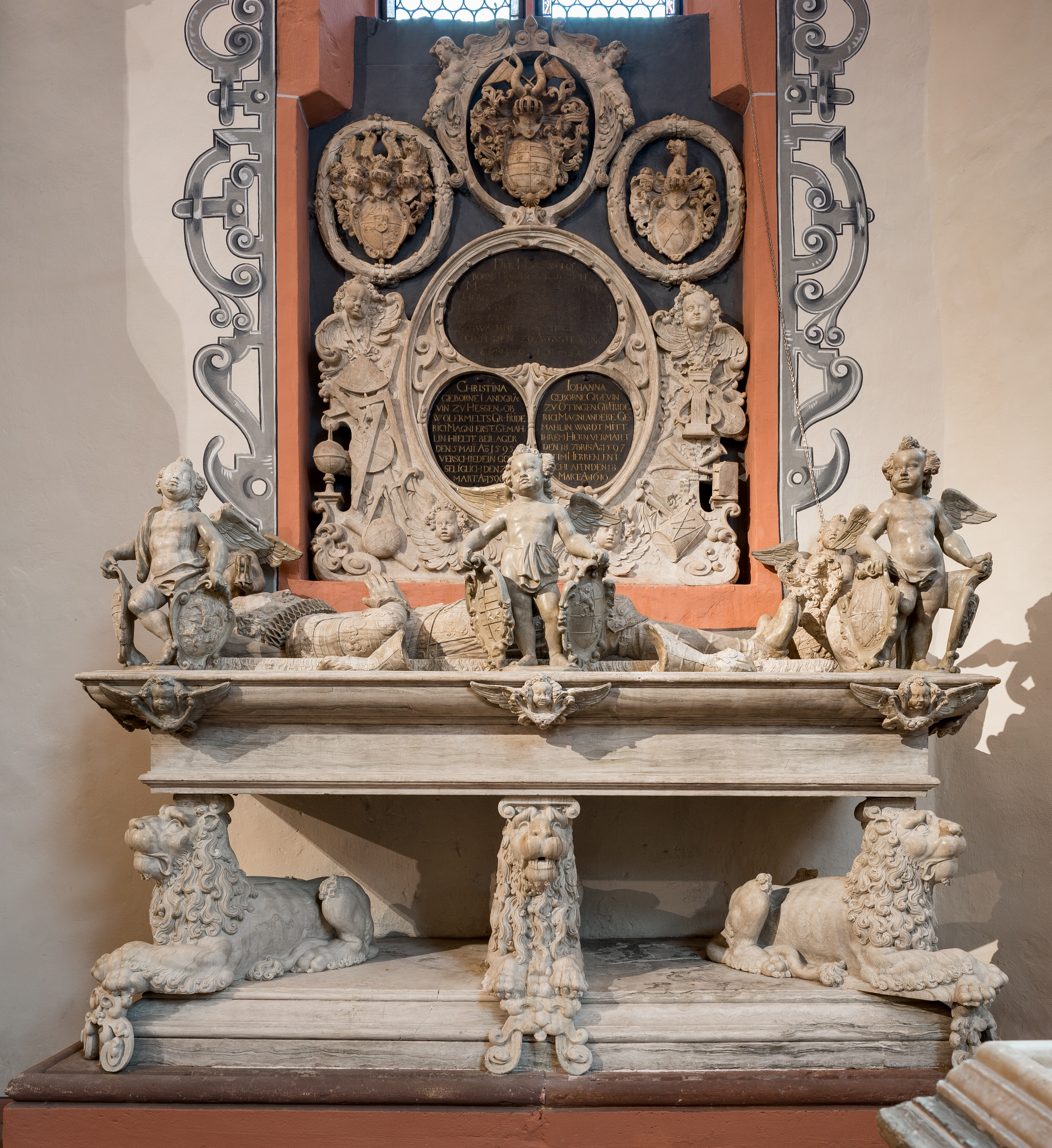
Epitaph of Frederick Magnus, Count of Erbach-Fürstenau, Michelstadt

Frederick Magnus, Count of Erbach-Fürstenau (18 April 1575 – 26 March 1618), was a German count, member of the House of Erbach who ruled over Fürstenau and Reichenberg.

== Early life and ancestry ==
Born in Erbach, he was the third child and second (but eldest surviving) son of George III, Count of Erbach-Breuberg by his second wife Countess Anna of Solms-Laubach (1557–1586). His maternal grandfather was Frederick Magnus, Count of Solms-Laubach-Sonnenwalde. He was, most probably, named after him.

== Life ==
After the death of their father, Frederick Magnus and his surviving brothers divided the Erbach domains in 1606. He received the districts of Fürstenau and Reichenberg. Because he died without surviving male children, his brothers divided his domains among themselves.

== Marriages and issue ==
His first marriage was to Landgravine Christine of Hesse-Darmstadt (1578–1596), the eldest daughter of George I, Landgrave of Hesse-Darmstadt by his wife, Countess Magdalena of Lippe. The marriage remained childless.

His second marriage was to Countess Johanna Henriette of Oettingen-Oettingen (1578–1619), the youngest daughter of Count Gottfried, Count of Oettingen-Oettingen (1554–1622) by his first wife, Countess Johanna of Hohenlohe-Waldenburg (1557–1585). Together, they had one surviving child. This daughter was Countess Anna Maria of Erbach-Fürstenau (1603–1663), who married Johann Georg II, Count of Solms-Baruth (1591–1632).

== Death ==
Frederick Magnus died in Reichenberg aged 42 and was buried in Michelstadt.
