= Louis V of Hesse-Darmstadt =

German nobleman

Louis V
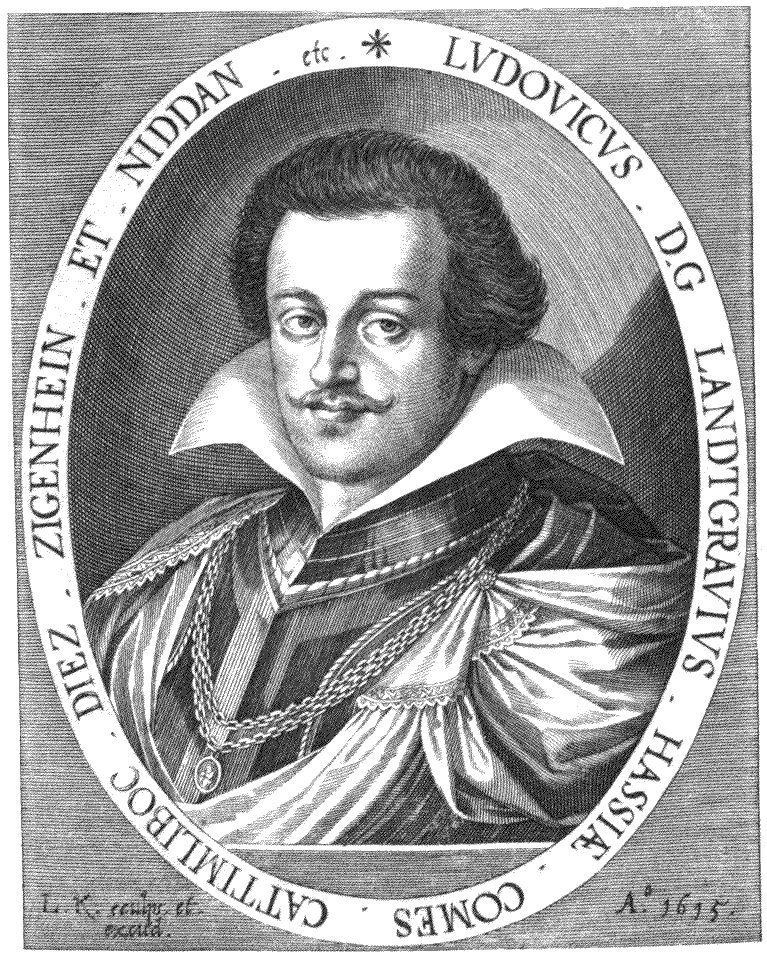
- 1615 engraving

Landgrave of Hesse-Darmstadt
- Reign: 7 February 1596 – 27 July 1626
- Predecessor: George I
- Successor: George II
- Born: 24 September 1577; Darmstadt, Landgraviate of Hesse-Darmstadt, Holy Roman Empire
- Died: 27 July 1626 (aged 48) near Rheinfels
- Spouse: Magdalene of Brandenburg (m. 1598; died 1616)
- Issue more...: Elisabeth Magdalene, Duchess of Württemberg-Montbéliard; Anna Eleonore, Duchess of Brunswick-Lüneburg; Sofie Agnes, Countess Palatine of Sulzbach-Hilpoltstein; George II of Hesse-Darmstadt; Juliane, Countess of East Frisia; Princess Amalie; John, Landgrave of Hesse-Braubach; Prince Henry; Prince Frederick
- House: Hesse-Darmstadt
- Father: George I of Hesse-Darmstadt
- Mother: Magdalene of Lippe

Louis V of Hesse-Darmstadt (German: Ludwig; 24 September 1577 – 27 July 1626) was the Landgrave of Hesse-Darmstadt from 1596 to 1626.

== Early life ==
He was born on 24 September 1577 as the son of Landgrave George I of Hesse-Darmstadt and Magdalene of Lippe, daughter of Count Bernhard VIII of Lippe.

== Biography ==
In 1604 he inherited a part of Hessen-Marburg after the death of Louis IV of Hesse-Marburg who was childless. The other half went to Maurice of Hesse-Kassel (or Hesse-Cassel), but since Maurice was a Calvinist, Ludwig claimed a right on the whole of Hesse-Marburg. Lutheran professors of the University of Marburg who refused to convert to Calvinism founded in 1607 the University of Gießen which was named Ludoviciana.

This led to a conflict during the Thirty Years' War, between Louis V, who stood on the side of the Emperor, and Maurice, who was on the side of the Protestants. Hesse-Darmstadt suffered severely from the ravages from the Swedes during the conflict.

The Landgrave died in 1626 and he was succeeded by George II of Hesse-Darmstadt.

In 1722, Johann Georg Liebknecht, an astronomer at the University of Gießen, named a star, which he thought was a planet, Sidus Ludoviciana after Ludwig V.

== Issue ==
Louis V married Magdalene of Brandenburg, daughter of John George, Elector of Brandenburg and his third wife, Elisabeth of Anhalt-Zerbst. They had issue:

- Elisabeth Magdalene of Hesse-Darmstadt (23 April 1600, Darmstadt – 9 June 1624, Montbéliard), who married Louis Frederick, Duke of Württemberg-Montbéliard.
- Anne Eleonore of Hesse-Darmstadt (30 July 1601 – 6 May 1659)
- Sofie Agnes of Hesse-Darmstadt (12 January 1604, Darmstadt – 8 September 1664, Hilpoltstein) married Johann Friedrich, Count Palatine of Sulzbach-Hilpoltstein.
- George II of Hesse-Darmstadt (17 March 1605 – 11 June 1661)
- Juliane of Hesse-Darmstadt (14 April 1606, Darmstadt – 15 January 1659 Hanover)
- Amalie of Hesse-Darmstadt (20 June 1607 – 11 September 1627) never married
- John, Landgrave of Hesse-Braubach (17 June 1609, Darmstadt – 1 April 1651, Ems)
- Henry of Hesse-Darmstadt (1 April 1612, Darmstadt – 21 October 1629) Never married or had children.
- Hedwig of Hesse-Darmstadt (22 June 1613, Darmstadt – 2 March 1614) Died young
- Louis of Hesse-Darmstadt (12 September 1614, Darmstadt – 16 September 1614) Died in infancy
- Frederick of Hesse-Darmstadt (28 February 1616, Darmstadt – 19 February 1682)

== Ancestry ==
Ancestors of Louis V of Hesse-Darmstadt

8. William II, Landgrave of Hesse
4. Philip I of Hesse
9. Anna of Mecklenburg-Schwerin
2. George I of Hesse-Darmstadt
10. George, Duke of Saxony
5. Christine of Saxony
11. Barbara Jagiellon
1. Louis V, Landgrave of Hesse-Darmstadt
12. Simon V of Lippe
6. Bernhard VIII of Lippe
13. Magdalena of Mansfeld
3. Magdalene of Lippe
14. Philip III, Count of Waldeck-Eisenberg
7. Katharina of Waldeck-Eisenberg
15. Anna of Cleves

Louis V of Hesse-Darmstadt House of Hesse Born: 24 September 1577 Died: 27 July 1626
Regnal titles
Preceded by George I	Landgrave of Hesse-Darmstadt; 1596–1626	Succeeded by George II
