= Prince-Bishopric of Osnabrück =

Territory of the Holy Roman Empire (1225–1803)

Coordinates: 52.2833°N 8.1464°E

Prince-Bishopric of Osnabrück Hochstift Osnabrück
- 1225–1803
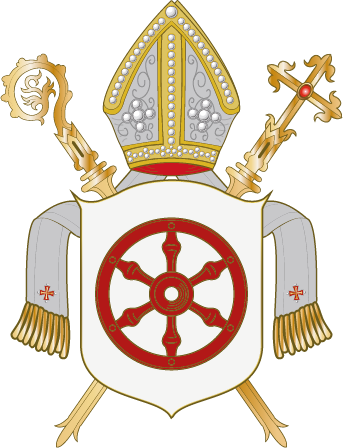
- Coat of arms

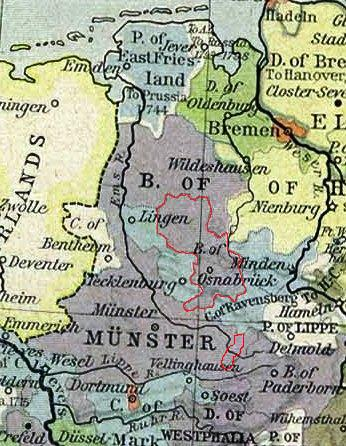
- Prince-Bishopric of Osnabrück in 1786 (red line).
- Status: Prince-Bishopric
- Capital: Osnabrück
- Common languages: Low Saxon, German
- Religion: Roman Catholic until the 1540s, then also Lutheran
- Government: Ecclesiastical principality
- Prince-Bishop
- Historical era: Middle Ages
  - Created on collapse of Saxony: 1225
  - Secularised to Hanover: 1803
Preceded by	Succeeded by
Duchy of Saxony / Duchy of Saxony	Electorate of Hanover

The Prince-Bishopric of Osnabrück (German: Hochstift Osnabrück; Fürstbistum Osnabrück, Bistum Osnabrück) was an ecclesiastical principality of the Holy Roman Empire from 1225 until 1803. It should not be confused with the Diocese of Osnabrück (Bistum Osnabrück), which was larger and over which the prince-bishop exercised only the spiritual authority of an ordinary bishop. It was named after its capital, Osnabrück.

The still-extant Diocese of Osnabrück, erected in 772, is the oldest episcopal see founded by Charlemagne, in order to Christianize the conquered stem-duchy of Saxony. The episcopal and capitular temporal possessions of the see, originally quite limited, grew in time, and its prince-bishops exercised an extensive civil jurisdiction within the territory covered by their rights of Imperial immunity. The Prince-Bishopric continued to grow in size, making its status during the Reformation a highly contentious issue. The Peace of Westphalia left the city bi-confessional and had the Prince-Bishops alternate between Catholic and Protestant.

The bishopric was dissolved in the German Mediatisation of 1803, when it was incorporated into the neighboring Electorate of Hanover. The see, the chapter, the convents and the Catholic charitable institutions were secularized. The territory of the see passed to Prussia in 1806, to the Kingdom of Westphalia in 1807, to Napoleonic France in 1810, and back to Hanover in 1814.

With the end of the prince-bishopric, the future of the diocese became unclear. Klemens von Gruben, titular Bishop of Paros in Greece, was made vicar apostolic of Osnabrück, and as such cared for the spiritual interests of the Catholic population. The ordinary Latin (Roman) Catholic episcopacy was restored in 1824, but henceforth the bishops would no longer wield any temporal power.

== History ==
The temporal protectorate (Latin: Advocatia; German: Vogtei) exercised over so many mediaeval dioceses by laymen became, after the 12th century, hereditary in the Amelung family, from whom it passed to Henry the Lion.

After Henry's overthrow, it came into the possession of Count Simon of Tecklenburg and his descendants, though it was the source of many conflicts with the bishops. In 1236 the Count of Tecklenburg was forced to renounce all jurisdiction over the town of Osnabrück, as well as the lands of the see, the chapter and the parish churches. On the other hand, the bishop and chapter, from the 13th century on, expanded their jurisdiction over many convents, churches and hamlets. Scarcely any other German see freed itself so thoroughly from civil jurisdiction within its territory. The royal prerogatives were transferred little by little to the bishop, e.g. the holding of fairs and markets, rights of toll and coinage, forest and hunting rights, mining royalties and fortresses so that, by the early part of the 13th century, the bishop was the real governor of the civil territory of Osnabrück.

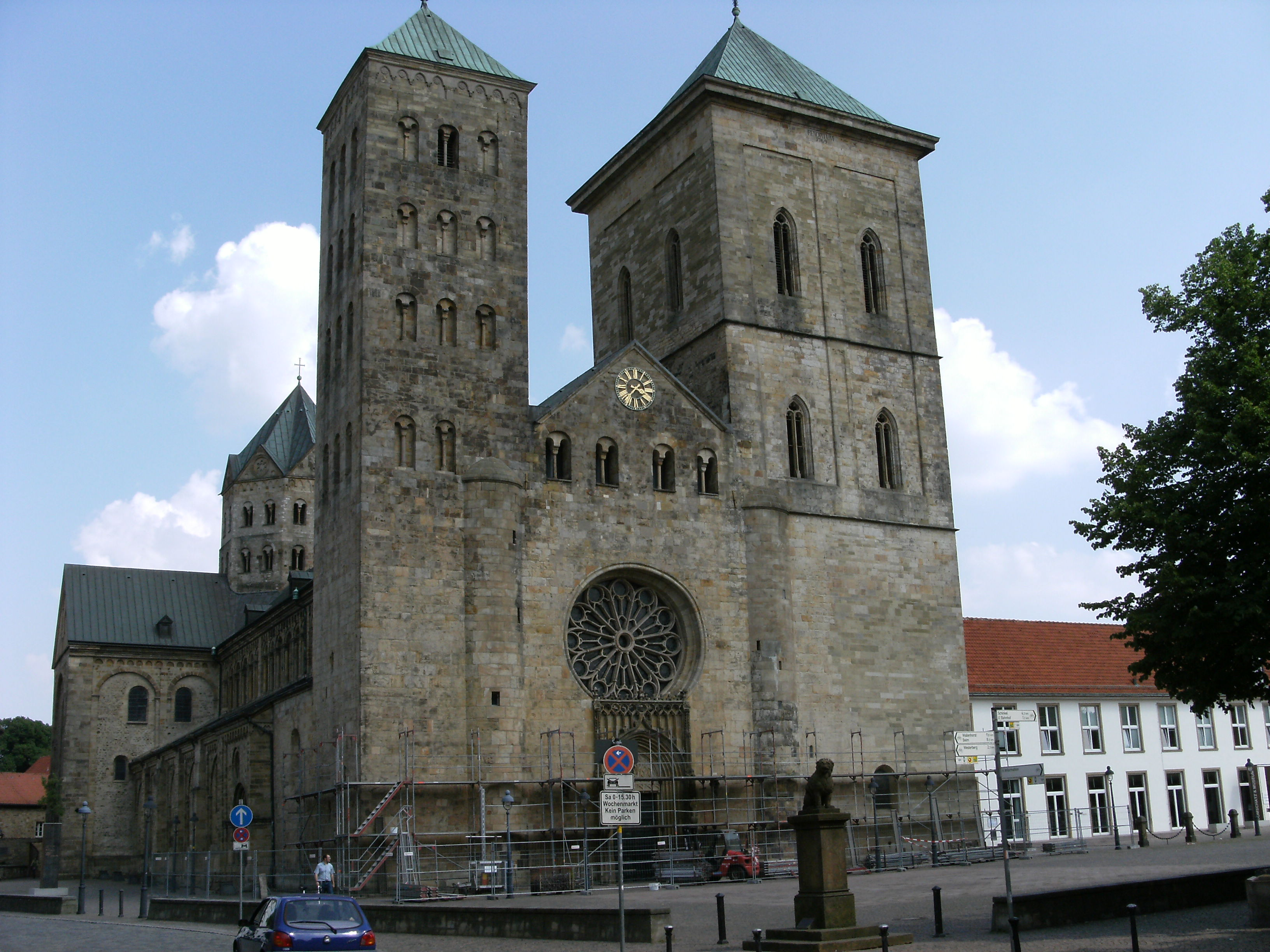
St. Peter's Cathedral (Osnabrück)

Among the prominent mediaeval bishops were:

- Drogo (952–68)
- Conrad of Veltberg (1002)
- the learned Thietmar or Detmar (1003–22)
- Benno II (1067–88)
- Johann I (1001–10), who built the actual cathedral in place of the wooden one destroyed by fire in the time of his predecessor
- Diethard I (1119–37), who was the first bishop elected by the free choice of the cathedral clergy
- Philip II (1141–73), who ended the conflicts between his see and the Imperial Abbeys of Corvey and Hersfeld
- Arnold of Berg (1137–91), who died a crusader at Akkon.

Beginning in the 13th century, the new orders of Franciscans, Dominicans and Augustinians were received with favour. Bishops in this period included:

- Engelbert of Altena-Isenberg (1224–26, deposed following his implication in Archbishop Engelbert II of Berg's assassination, rehabilitated 1238–50)
- Bruno of Altena-Isenberg (1250–59)
- Conrad II of Rietberg (1269–97)

=== 14th to 16th centuries ===
In the 14th and 15th centuries, the power of the bishops waned before the increasing influence of the cathedral chapter, of the military servants (or knights) of the diocese, and of the town of Osnabrück. The last sought to free itself from the bishop's sovereignty, but never became a Free City of the Empire. The see was almost continually engaged in warlike troubles and difficulties and had even to defend itself against the Bishops of Minden and Münster. From the 14th century auxiliary bishops became necessary due to the civil duties that absorbed the attention of the bishop himself.

The successor of Bishop Conrad IV of Rietberg (1488–1508) was Eric of Brunswick (1508–32), simultaneously Bishop of Münster and Paderborn. He opposed the Reformers strongly and successfully. Franz of Waldeck (1533–53), also Bishop of Minden, acted, on the contrary, a very doubtful part. He offered little resistance to Lutheranism in Münster, though he vigorously opposed the Anabaptists; after 1543 he allowed in Osnabrück an evangelical service. However, the chapter and the Dominicans opposed a German service that dispensed with all the characteristics of the Roman Catholic Mass. In 1548, Bishop Franz promised to suppress the Reformation in Osnabrück and to execute the Augsburg Interim, but fulfilled his promise very indifferently; on his deathbed he received Lutheran communions. His successor, John IV of Hoya (1553–74), was more Catholic, but was succeeded by three bishops of a Protestant mind: Henry II of Saxe-Lauenburg (1574–85), Bernhard of Waldeck (1585–91), and Philip Sigismund (1591–1623). Under them the Reformation swept over most of the diocese.

=== 17th and 18th centuries ===
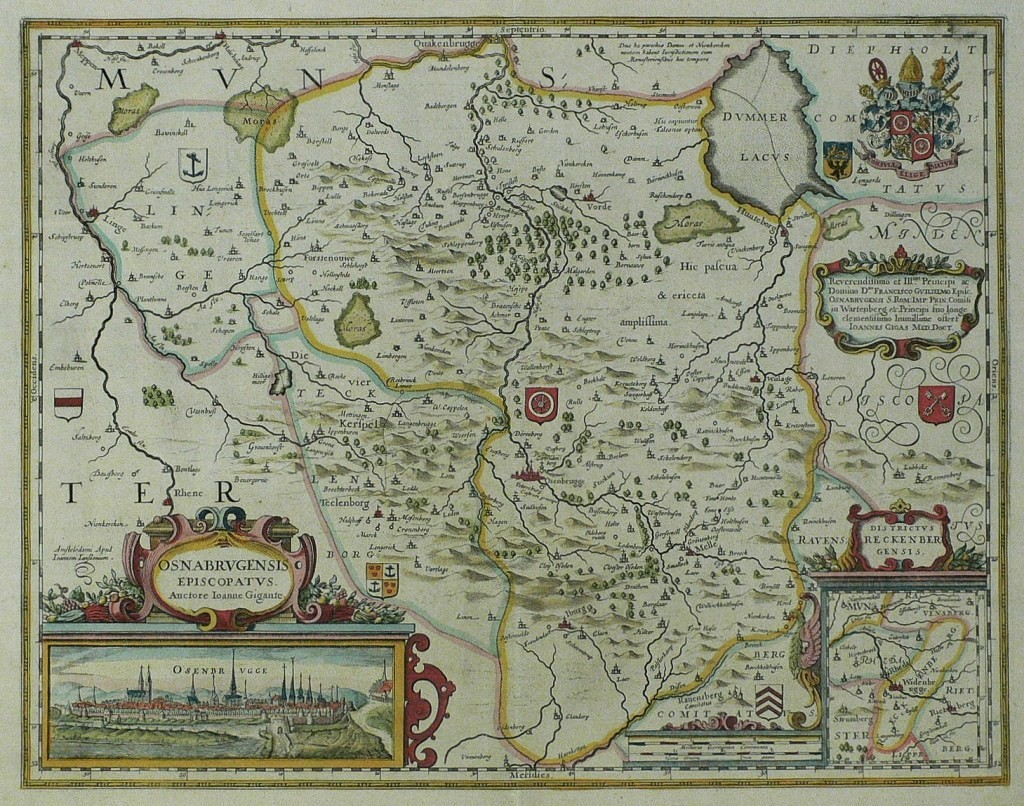
Map of the Prince-Bishopric in 1642

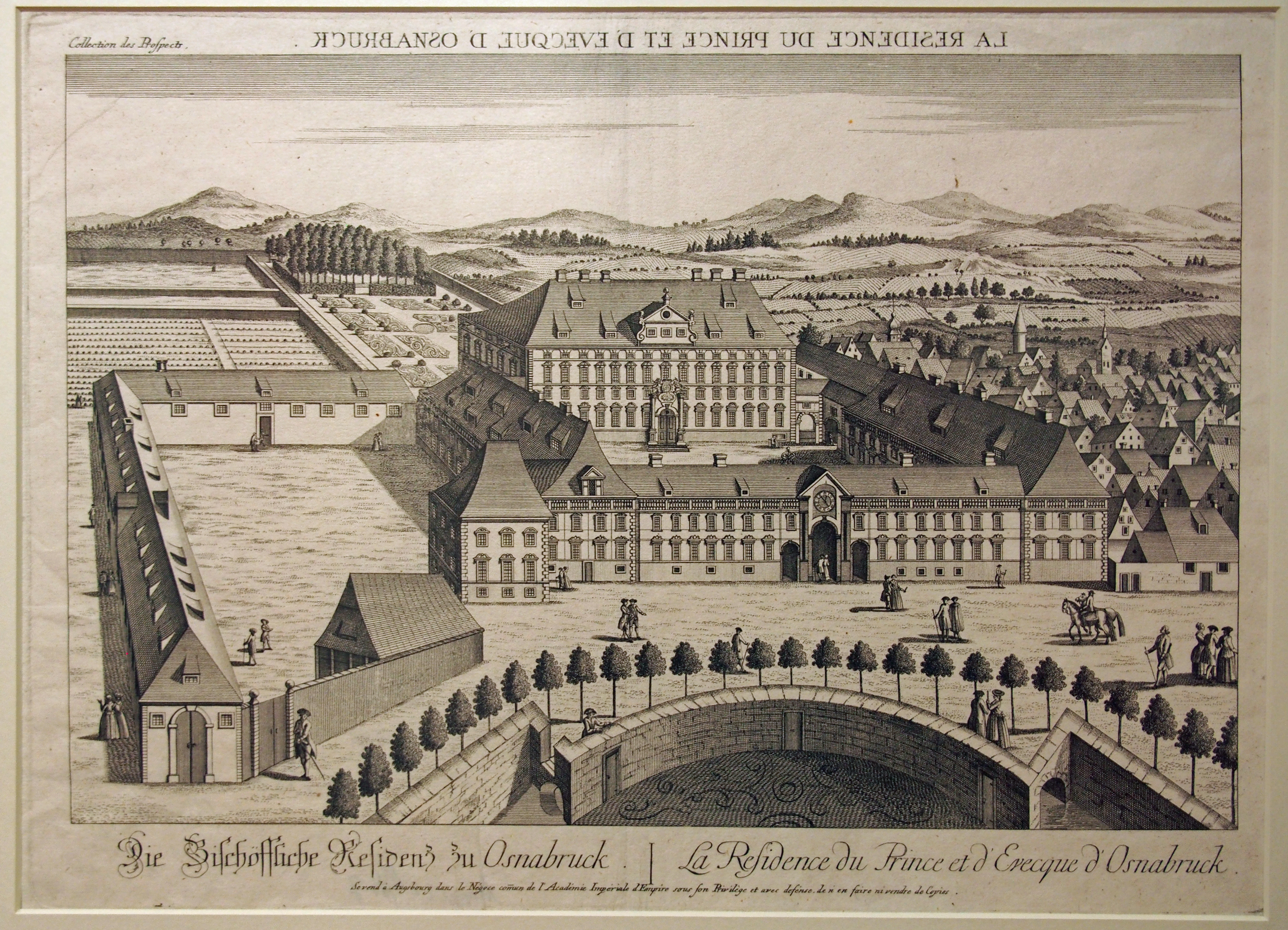
The Bishop's Palace at Osnabrück (after 1777)

In 1624, Cardinal Eitel Frederick of Hohenzollern became Bishop of Osnabrück and called in the Jesuits. However, he died soon afterwards. His successor, Francis of Wartenberg (1625–61), fulfilled the task of imposing the Counter-Reformation decrees. The city-council was purged of anti-Catholic elements and the former Augustinian convent was turned over to the Jesuits. The Edict of Restitution was executed successfully by him and in 1631 he founded a university at Osnabrück.

But in 1633, Osnabrück was captured by the Swedes: the university was discontinued, Catholic religious exercises suppressed, and the see (1633–51) administered by the conquerors. In 1648, the Peace of Westphalia was negotiated in Osnabrück and the nearby city of Munster. The Treaty of Osnabrück stipulated that the bishopric would return to the religious status it had in 1624. Henceforth, the prince-bishops would alternate between Catholic and Protestant officeholders, with the Protestant bishops to be selected from the cadets of the House of Brunswick-Lüneburg. The alternance was to be maintained without prejudice to the Catholic status of the bishopric or the right over it of the Archbishop of Cologne as metropolitan.

Wartenberg was made cardinal in 1660 and was succeeded by the married Protestant bishop, Ernest Augustus, Elector of Hanover (1661–98), who largely resided in Hanover. He built the new palace in Osnabrück from 1667 and was succeeded by the Catholic bishop, Prince Charles Joseph of Lorraine. The Protestant bishop Ernest Augustus (1715–28), second son of the previous Ernest Augustus, was succeeded by Clemens August of Bavaria, Archbishop-Elector of Cologne (1728–61). The last bishop was Prince Frederick of Great Britain (1764–1803), the second son of George III, King of Great Britain and Elector of Hanover. Prince Frederick was only six months old when he was elected bishop.

=== Residence ===
From about 1100, after a fire destroyed Osnabrück cathedral and its adjacent bishop's house, bishops had their residence at Iburg Castle. They moved back into town after Ernest Augustus built a baroque palace in Osnabrück, completed in 1673. Today Iburg Castle is a museum and seat of a local court while the Bishop's Palace houses the University of Osnabruck. King George I of Great Britain died in the palace while visiting his brother, prince-bishop Ernest Augustus, Duke of York and Albany, in 1727.

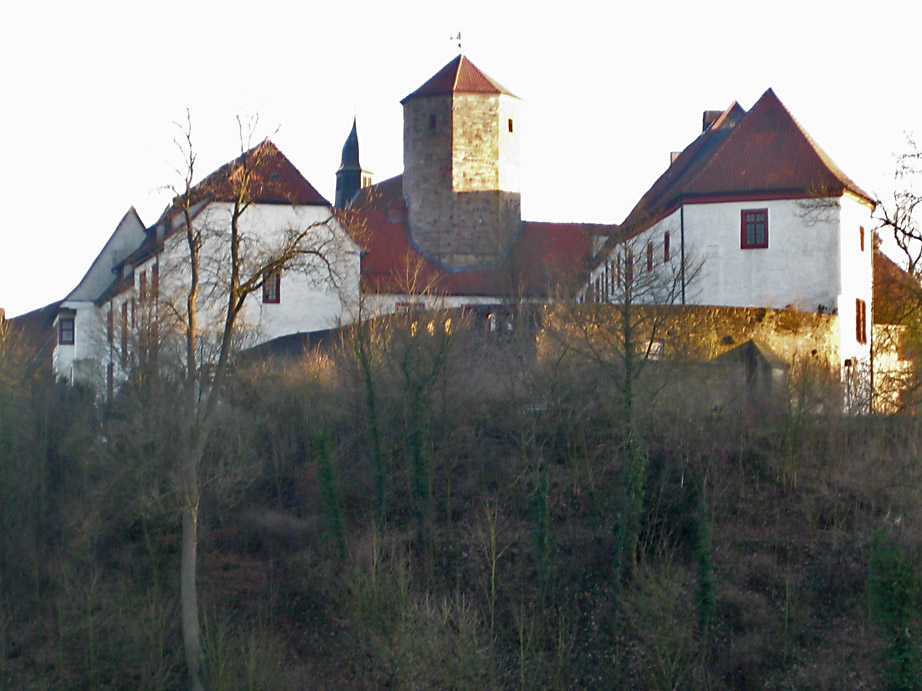
Iburg Castle

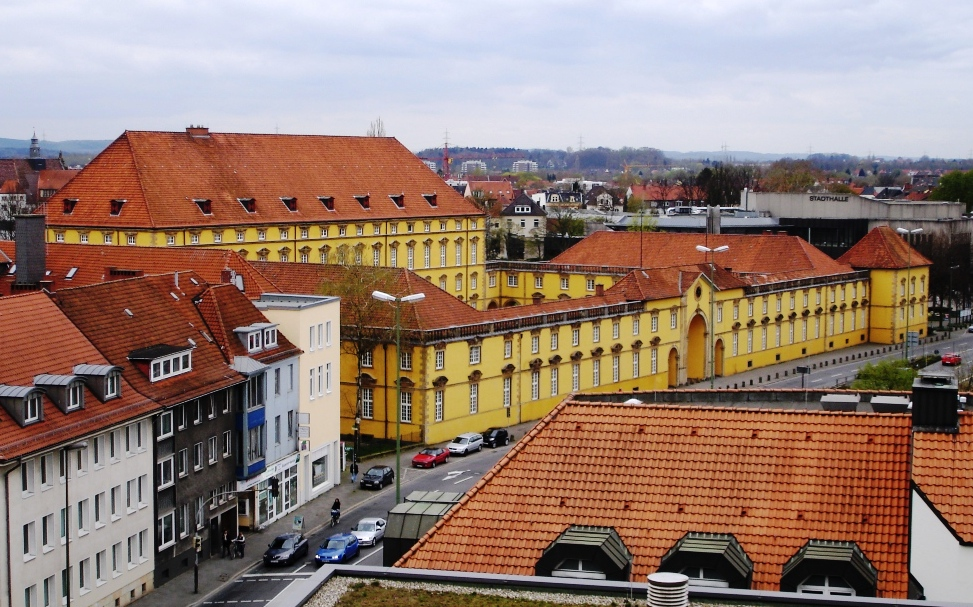
The Bishop's Palace, Osnabrück

== List of prince-bishops ==
Prince-bishops of Osnabrück include:

- 1224–1226: Engelbert I von Isenberg
- 1206–1227: Otto I
- 1227–1239: Konrad I von Velber
- 1239–1250: Engelbert I von Isenberg
- 1251–1258: Bruno von Isenberg
- 1259–1264: Balduin von Rüssel
- 1265–1269: Widukind von Waldeck
- 1270–1297: Konrad von Rietberg
- 1297–1308: Ludwig von Ravensberg
- 1309–1320: Engelbert II von Weyhe
- 1321–1349: Gottfried von Arnsberg
- 1350–1366: Johann II Hoet
- 1366–1376: Melchior von Braunschweig-Grubenhagen
- 1376–1402: Dietrich of Horne
- 1402–1410: Henry I of Schauenburg-Holstein
- 1410–1424: Otto von Hoya
- 1424–1437: Johann III von Diepholz
- 1437–1442: Erich von Hoya
- 1442–1450: Heinrich von Moers
- 1450–1454: Albert von Hoya
- 1454–1455: Rudolf von Diepholz
- 1455–1482: Konrad III von Diepholz
- 1482–1508: Konrad IV von Rietberg
- 1508–1532: Eric of Brunswick-Grubenhagen
- 1532–1553: Franz von Waldeck (Lutheran after 1543)
- 1553–1574: Johann II von Hoya (Catholic)
- 1574–1585: Henry II of Saxe-Lauenburg (Lutheran)
- 1585–1591: Bernhard von Waldeck (Lutheran)
- 1591–1623: Philip Sigismund of Brunswick-Wolfenbüttel (Lutheran)
- 1623–1625: Eitel Frederick von Hohenzollern-Sigmaringen (Catholic)
- 1625–1634: Franz Wilhelm von Wartenberg (Catholic)
- 1634–1648: Gustav Gustavsson af Vasaborg (Lutheran)
- 1648–1661: Franz Wilhelm von Wartenberg (Catholic)
- 1662–1698: Ernest Augustus, Elector of Hanover (Lutheran)
- 1698–1715: Charles Joseph of Lorraine (Catholic)
- 1715–1728: Ernest Augustus, Duke of York and Albany (Lutheran)
- 1728–1761: Klemens August of Bavaria (Catholic)
- 1764–1802: Prince Frederick, Duke of York and Albany (Lutheran), last Prince-Bishop

The prince-bishopric was mediatized in 1803 to the Electorate of Hanover. For Catholic bishops after the mediatization, see Roman Catholic Diocese of Osnabrück.

== General references ==
- Lins, Joseph (1911). "Diocese of Osnabrück". In Herbermann, Charles (ed.). Catholic Encyclopedia. Vol. 11. New York: Robert Appleton Company.
