= George I of Hesse-Darmstadt =

Holy Roman Empire noble (1567–1596)

George I
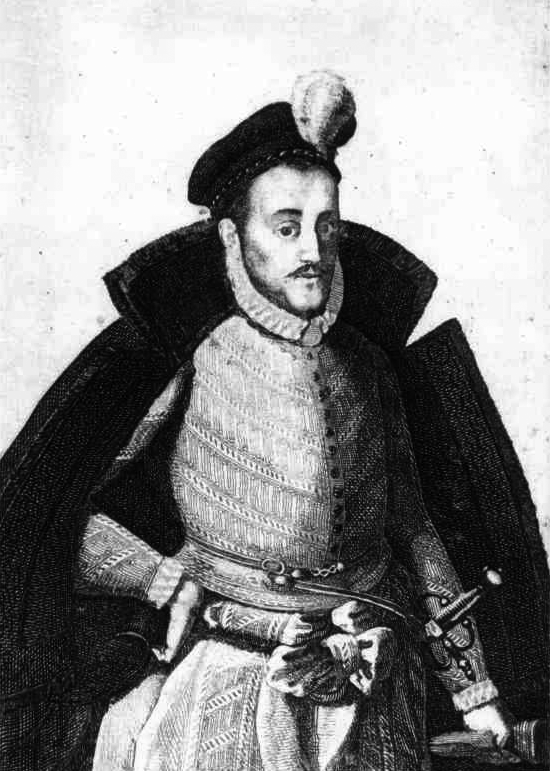
- George I, engraving by Johann Schweizer

Landgrave of Hesse-Darmstadt
- Reign: 21 March 1567 – 7 February 1596
- Predecessor: Philip I of Hesse
- Successor: Louis V
- Born: 10 September 1547; Kassel, Landgraviate of Hesse, Holy Roman Empire
- Died: 7 February 1596 (aged 48); Darmstadt, Landgraviate of Hesse-Darmstadt, Holy Roman Empire
- Spouse: Magdalene of Lippe (m. 1572; died 1587) Eleonore of Württemberg (m. 1589)
- Issue: Louis V, Landgrave of Hesse-Darmstadt; Christine, Countess of Erbach-Fürstenau; Elisabeth, Countess of Nassau-Weilburg-Gleiberg; Philip III, Landgrave of Hesse-Butzbach; Anna, Countess Albert Otto of Solms-Laubach; Frederick I, Landgrave of Hesse-Homburg; Prince Henry
- House: Hesse (birth); Hesse-Darmstadt (founder)
- Father: Philip I, Landgrave of Hesse
- Mother: Christine of Saxony

George I of Hesse-Darmstadt (10 September 1547 – 7 February 1596) was the Landgrave of Hesse-Darmstadt from 1567 to 1596.

== Early life ==
Born on 10 September 1547 in Kassel, he was the fourth son of Philip I, Landgrave of Hesse and his wife, Christine of Saxony.

== Biography ==
Following his father's death in 1567, Hesse was divided between his four sons. George I received the upper County of Katzenelnbogen and selected Darmstadt as his residence. He died on 7 February 1596 and the Landgraviate was passed to his son Louis.

== Marriages and issue ==
On 17 August 1572 he married Countess Magdalene of Lippe (1552–1587). They had 10 children.

- Philip William (16 June 1576 – 4 October 1576), Hereditary prince, died young
- Louis V (1577–1626), Landgrave of Hesse-Darmstadt

married in 1598 Princess Magdalene of Brandenburg (1582–1616)

- Christine (25 November 1578 – 26 March 1596)

married in 1595 Count Frederick Magnus of Erbach-Fürstenau (1575-1618)

- Elisabeth (29 November 1579 – 17 July 1655)

married in 1601 Count John Casimir of Nassau-Weilburg-Gleiberg (1577–1602)

- Marie Hedwig (2 December 1580 – 12 September 1582)
- Philip III (1581–1643), Landgrave of Hesse-Butzbach

married firstly, in 1610, Countess Anna Margarethe of Diepholz (1580–1629)
married secondly, in 1632, Countess Christine Sophie of East Frisia (1600–1658)

- Anna (3 March 1583 – 13 September 1631)

married in 1601 Count Albert Otto of Solms-Laubach (1576–1610)

- Frederick I (1585–1638), Landgrave of Hesse-Homburg

married in 1622 Countess Margarethe of Leiningen-Westerburg (1604–1667)

- Magdalene (5 May 1586 – 23 October 1586) died in infancy
- John (22 February 1587 – 22 February 1587) died in infancy

On 25 May 1589 he married Duchess Eleonore of Württemberg (1552–1618). They had 1 child:

- Henry (1 November 1590– 6 April 1601). Died young

== Death ==
George I Landgrave of Hesse-Darmstadt died on 7 February 1596 (aged 48) in Darmstadt, Landgraviate of Hesse-Darmstadt, Holy Roman Empire. He was interred, along with both of his wives, in a family crypt in the City Church of Darmstadt, Hesse, Germany.

== Ancestry ==
Ancestors of George I of Hesse-Darmstadt

8. Louis II, Landgrave of Hesse
4. William II, Landgrave of Hesse
9. Matilda of Württemberg-Urach
2. Philip I, Landgrave of Hesse
10. Magnus II, Duke of Mecklenburg-Schwerin and Güstrow
5. Anna of Mecklenburg-Schwerin
11. Sophie of Pomerania-Wolgast
1. George I, Landgrave of Hesse-Darmstadt
12. Albert III, Duke of Saxony
6. George, Duke of Saxony
13. Sidonie of Poděbrady
3. Christine of Saxony
14. Casimir IV Jagiellon
7. Barbara Jagiellon
15. Elisabeth of Austria

George I of Hesse-Darmstadt House of Hesse Born: 10 September 1547 Died: 7 February 1596
Regnal titles
Preceded by Philip I of Hesse	Landgrave of Hesse-Darmstadt; 1567–1596	Succeeded by Louis V
