= Countess Palatine Maria Anna of Neuburg =

Maria Anna of Neuburg
- Countess Palatine of Neuburg; Duchess of Bavaria
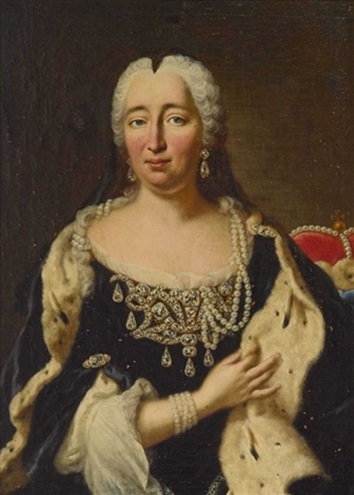
- Born: 30 January 1693; Reichstadt, Bohemia
- Died: 12 September 1751 (aged 58); Ahaus, Holy Roman Empire
- Spouse: Ferdinand Maria of Bavaria
- Issue: Prince Maximilian Francis; Duke Clement Francis of Bavaria; Princess Theresa Emmanuela
Names
- Marie Anna Karoline
- Father: Count Palatine Philip Wilhelm of Neuburg
- Mother: Duchess Anna Maria of Saxe-Lauenburg

Maria Anna of Neuburg (Marie Anna Karoline; 30 January 1693 – 12 September 1751) was a daughter of Anna Maria, Grand Duchess of Tuscany's first marriage to Philip William August of Neuburg. She married Duke Ferdinand Maria of Bavaria on 5 February 1719 in Reichstadt, Bohemia, a younger son of Elector Maximilian II of Bavaria. They had three children, only one of whom lived to mature adulthood.

She was still an infant when her father and older sister, Leopoldina, died within a month of one another in 1693. Her mother, a wealthy widow, was married for a second time, against her wishes, on 2 July 1697 in Düsseldorf to Prince Gian Gastone de' Medici, a younger son of the Grand Duke of Tuscany, to whom she brought the prospect of inheriting substantial lands in Bohemia. Rather than dwelling in her father-in-law's capital, Florence, the couple initially took up residence at his wife's Bohemian domain, the castle of Ploskovice near Reichstadt. In less than a year Gian Gastone left his wife for Prague, thence resuming residence in Florence, and the couple never again cohabited.

In 1723 Maria Anna's stepfather became Grand Duke Gian Gastone of Tuscany, succeeding his elder brother, and her mother became Grand Duchess of Tuscany, although she never set foot in her husband's realm. Maria Anna's husband died in 1738. She herself died in 1751 aged 58.

== Marriage and issue ==
Maria Anna married Ferdinand Maria of Bavaria, who became an Imperial general, on 5 February 1719 in Reichstadt, Bohemia. They had the following children:

- Maximilian Francis Joseph (1720–1738), died unmarried and without issue.
- Clement Francis de Paula (1722–1770), married in 1742 Countess Palatine Maria Anna of Pfalz-Sulzbach (1722–1790), without surviving issue.
- Theresa Emmanuela (1723–1743), died unmarried and without issue.

== Ancestors ==
Ancestors of Countess Palatine Maria Anna of Neuburg

8. Wolfgang Wilhelm, Count Palatine of Neuburg
4. Philip William, Elector Palatine
9. Magdalene of Bavaria
2. Count Palatine Philip William August of Neuburg
10. George II, Landgrave of Hesse-Darmstadt
5. Landgravine Elisabeth Amalie of Hesse-Darmstadt
11. Sophia Eleonore of Saxony
1. Maria Anna of Neuburg
12. Julius Henry of Saxe-Lauenburg
6. Duke Julius Francis of Saxe-Lauenburg
13. Anna Magdalene, Lady of Lobkowicz
3. Anna Maria Franziska of Saxe-Lauenburg
14. Christian Augustus, Count Palatine of Sulzbach
7. Hedwig of the Palatinate-Sulzbach
15. Countess Amalie of Nassau
