= Anna Maria Franziska of Saxe-Lauenburg =

Grand Duchess of Tuscany from 1723 to 1737

Anna Maria Franziska
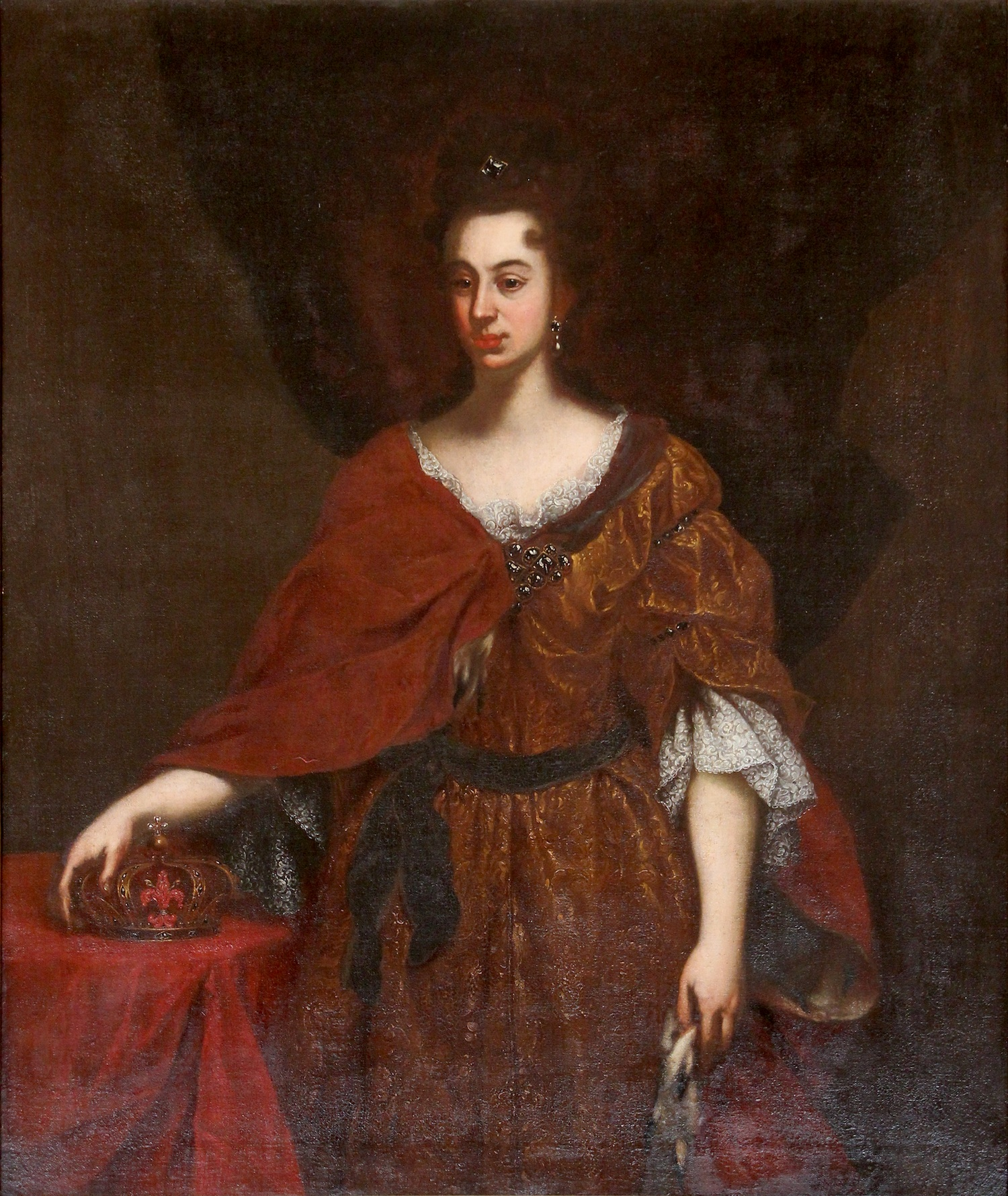
- Anna Marie Franziska, official portrait as Grand Duchess of Tuscany

Grand Duchess consort of Tuscany
- Tenure: 31 October 1723 – 9 July 1737
- Born: 13 June 1672; Neuhaus upon Elbe, Lower Saxony, Holy Roman Empire (now Germany)
- Died: 15 October 1741 (aged 69); Zákupy, Bohemia, Habsburg monarchy (now Czech Republic)
- Burial: Reichstadt
- Spouse: Philipp Wilhelm of Neuburg (m. 1690; died 1693) Gian Gastone de' Medici (m. 1697; died 1737)
- Issue Detail: Maria Anna, Duchess of Bavaria
Names
- Anna Maria Franziska
- House: Ascania
- Father: Julius Francis of Saxe-Lauenburg
- Mother: Hedwig of the Palatinate

Anna Maria Franziska of Saxe-Lauenburg (13 June 1672 – 15 October 1741) was the legal Duchess of Saxe-Lauenburg in the eyes of the Holy Roman Emperor, the overlord of Saxe-Lauenburg, from 1689 until 1728; however, because her distant cousin George William, Duke of Brunswick-Lüneburg, conquered the duchy by force in 1689, she exercised no control over the territory, instead living in her manors in Bohemia.

She first married Philipp Wilhelm August of Palatine-Neuburg in 1690, with whom she had her only child, Maria Anna, in 1691. She was widowed in 1693. Four years later, she married the last Medici Grand Duke Gian Gastone, a Prince of Tuscany.

With her brother-in-law Ferdinando de' Medici's death in 1713, her husband became Tuscany's heir-apparent. She became Grand Duchess of Tuscany upon the incumbent ruler's death in 1723, a title which she held for fourteen years before being widowed again in 1737.

== Biography ==
=== Early life ===
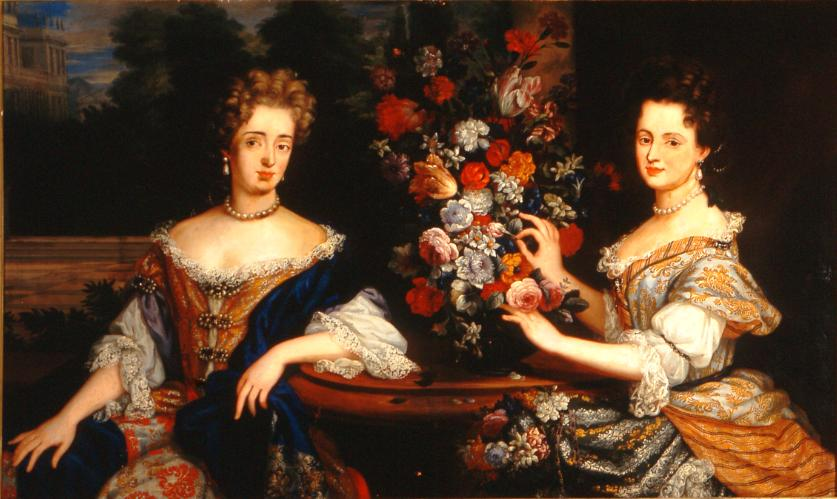
Anna Maria Franziska (R) with her sister Sibylle (L), c. 1690 by an anonymous artist

Anna Maria Franziska was born on 13 June 1673 as the elder surviving daughter of Duke Julius Francis, reigning Duke of Saxe-Lauenburg, and Hedwig of Palatinate-Sulzbach, who died when Anna was nine years-old. With the death of her father on 30 September 1689 the Lauenburg line of the House of Ascania was extinct in the male line. However, female succession was possible by the Saxe-Lauenburgian laws.

Now the legal female heir to the throne, she and her sister Sibylle of Saxe-Lauenburg fought for Anna Maria Franziska's right to the succession, as she was the elder sister. Julius Francis' cousin, Eleonore Charlotte of Saxe-Lauenburg-Franzhagen, also claimed the succession. Their weakness was abused by Duke George William of the neighbouring Brunswick-Lunenburgian Principality of Lüneburg-Celle, who invaded Saxe-Lauenburg with his troops, thus inhibiting Anna Maria's ascension as Duchess regnant.

Other monarchies also claimed the succession, evoking a conflict further involving the neighbouring duchies of Mecklenburg-Schwerin and of Danish Holstein, as well as the five Ascanian-ruled Principalities of Anhalt, the Electorate of Saxony, which had succeeded the Saxe-Wittenbergian Ascanians in 1422, Sweden and Brandenburg. The conflict was finally settled on 9 October 1693 (Hamburger Vergleich), definitely ousting the dispossessed Anna Maria and her sister. Both sisters never gave up the claim.

Emperor Leopold I rejected Celle's succession and thus retained the Saxe-Lauenburgian exclave of Hadeln, which was out of Celle's reach, in his custody. Only in 1728 his son Emperor Charles VI enfeoffed George II of Great Britain with Saxe-Lauenburg, finally legitimising the de facto takeover by his grandfather in 1689 and 1693. In 1731 George II also gained Hadeln from imperial custody.

=== First marriage ===
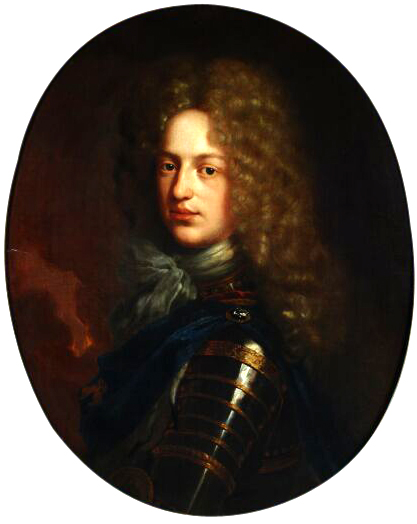
Philip William August, Count Palatine of Neuburg, first husband of Anna Maria. A canvas by Pieter van der Werff, 1690

Anna Maria married Philipp Willhelm August of the Palatinate-Neuburg. The wedding took place in Bohemia, at the castle of Roudnice (Raudnitz) on 29 October 1690. He was the eighth son of Philip William, Elector Palatine. They had two children together, one survived to adulthood:

- Countess Palatine Leopoldine Eleonore Elisabeth Auguste of Neuburg (b. Neuburg, 22 October 1691 – d. Reichstadt, 8 March 1693).
- Countess Palatine Marie Anne Karoline Louise Franziska of Neuburg (b. Reichstadt, 30 January 1693 – d. Ahaus, 12 September 1751), married on 5 February 1719 to Duke Ferdinand Maria Innocenz of Bavaria (1699–1738), he was the sixth son of Maximilian II Emanuel, Elector of Bavaria and an Imperial Field Marshal; with whom she had two sons and one daughter:
  - Duke Maximilian Joseph Franz of Bavaria (b. Munich, 11 April 1720 – d. Munich, 28 April 1738).
  - Duke Klemens Franz de Paula of Bavaria, (b. Munich, 19 April 1722 – d. Munich, 6 August 1770), married 17 January 1742 to Countess Palatine Maria Anna of Sulzbach (1722–1790), daughter of Joseph Charles, Count Palatine of Sulzbach and Elizabeth Augusta of the Palatinate, the couple had two sons and two daughters, who all died shortly after birth:
    - Duchess Maria of Bavaria (b. and d. 30 September 1748).
    - A son (b. and d. 31 May 1754).
    - Duchess Maria Anna of Bavaria (b. and d. 28 January 1755).
    - A son (b. and d. 23 June 1756).
  - Duchess Theresia Emanuela of Bavaria (b. Munich, 22 July 1723 – d. Frankfurt, 27 March 1743).

Philipp Wilhelm died on 5 April 1693.

=== Second marriage ===
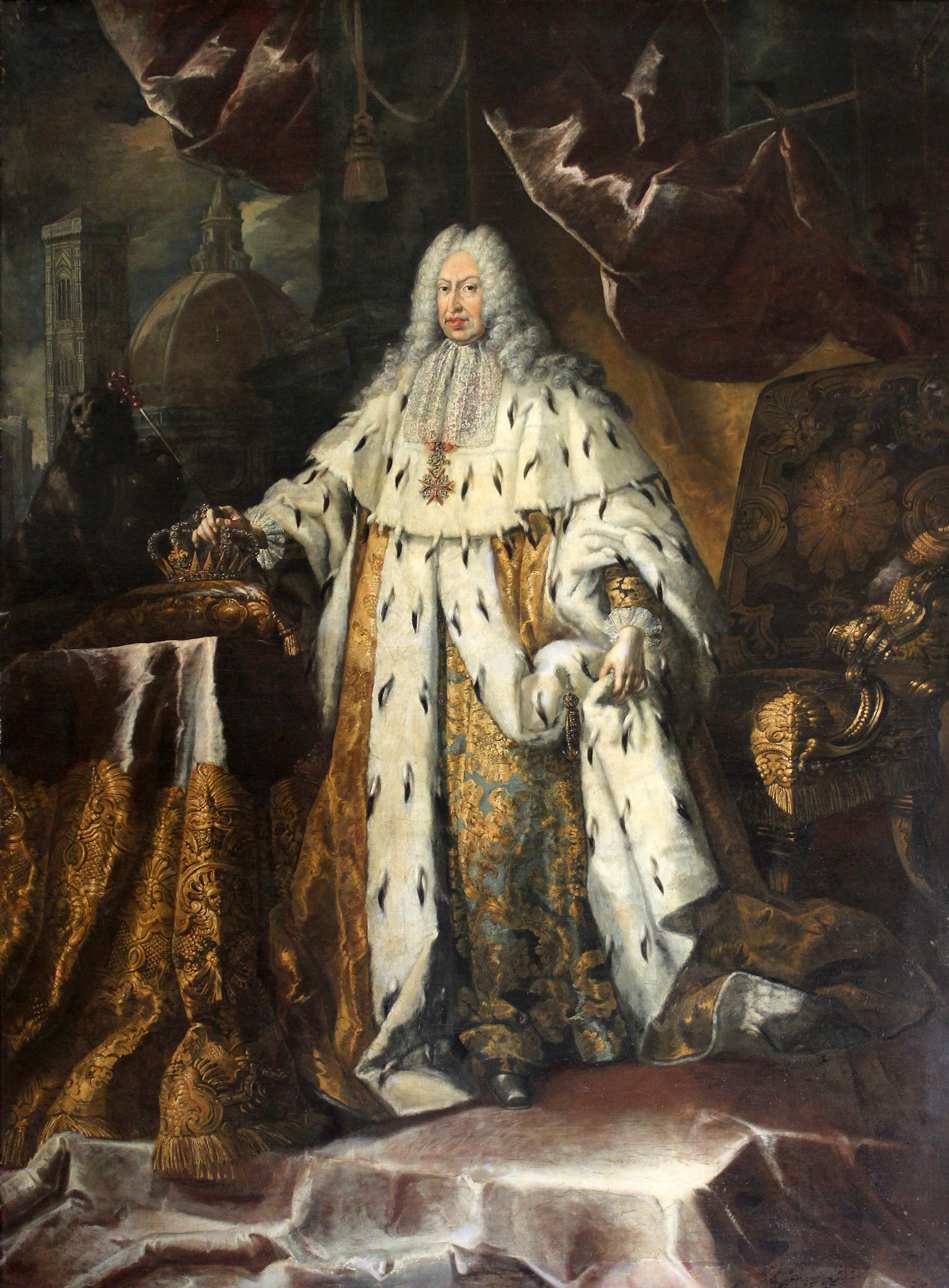
Gian Gastone de' Medici, Grand Duke of Tuscany, second husband of Anna Maria. A canvas by Franz Ferdinand Richter, 1737

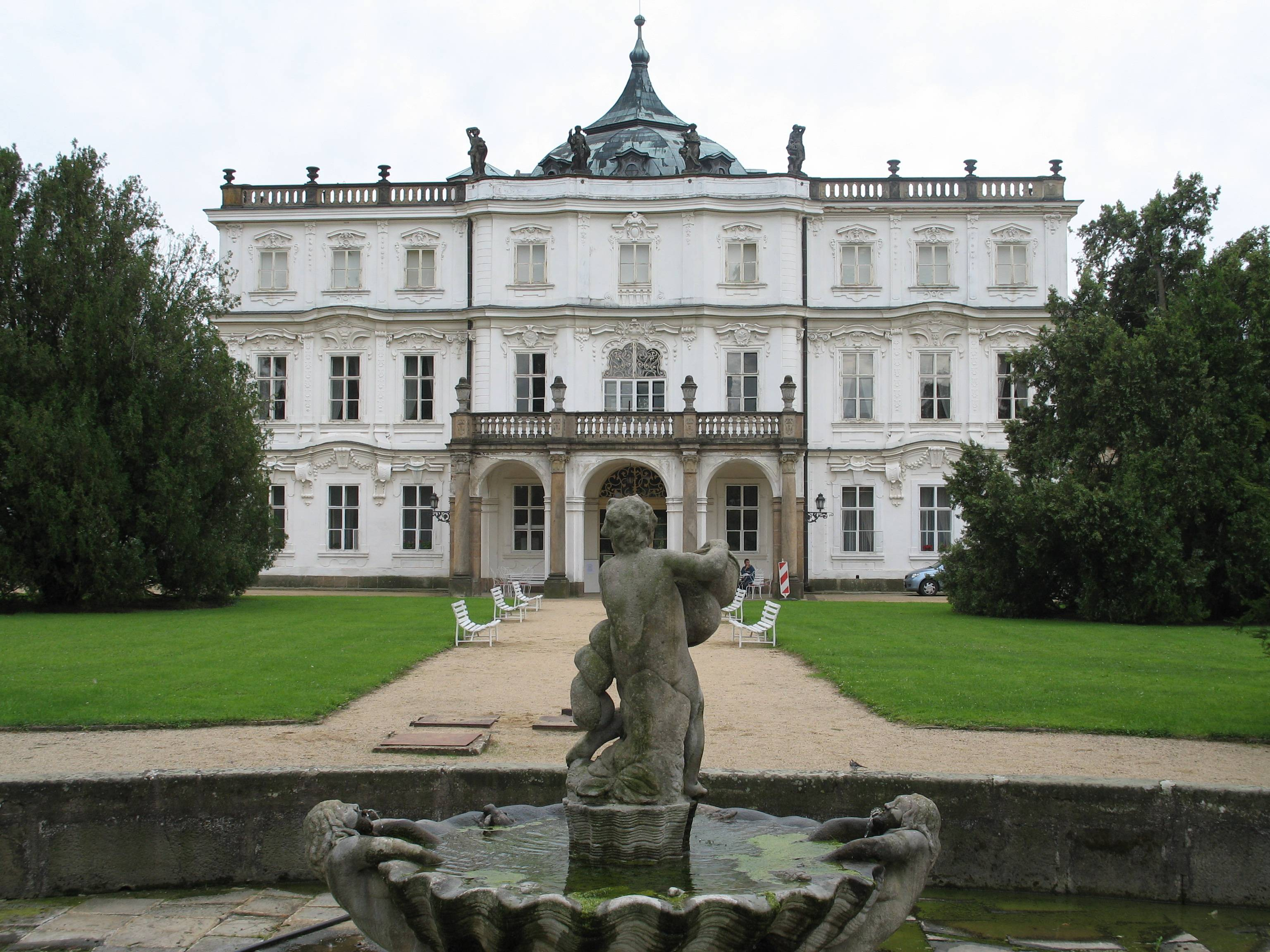
Ploskovice Chateau, Anna Maria's Bohemian residence; she greatly renovated the house and gardens

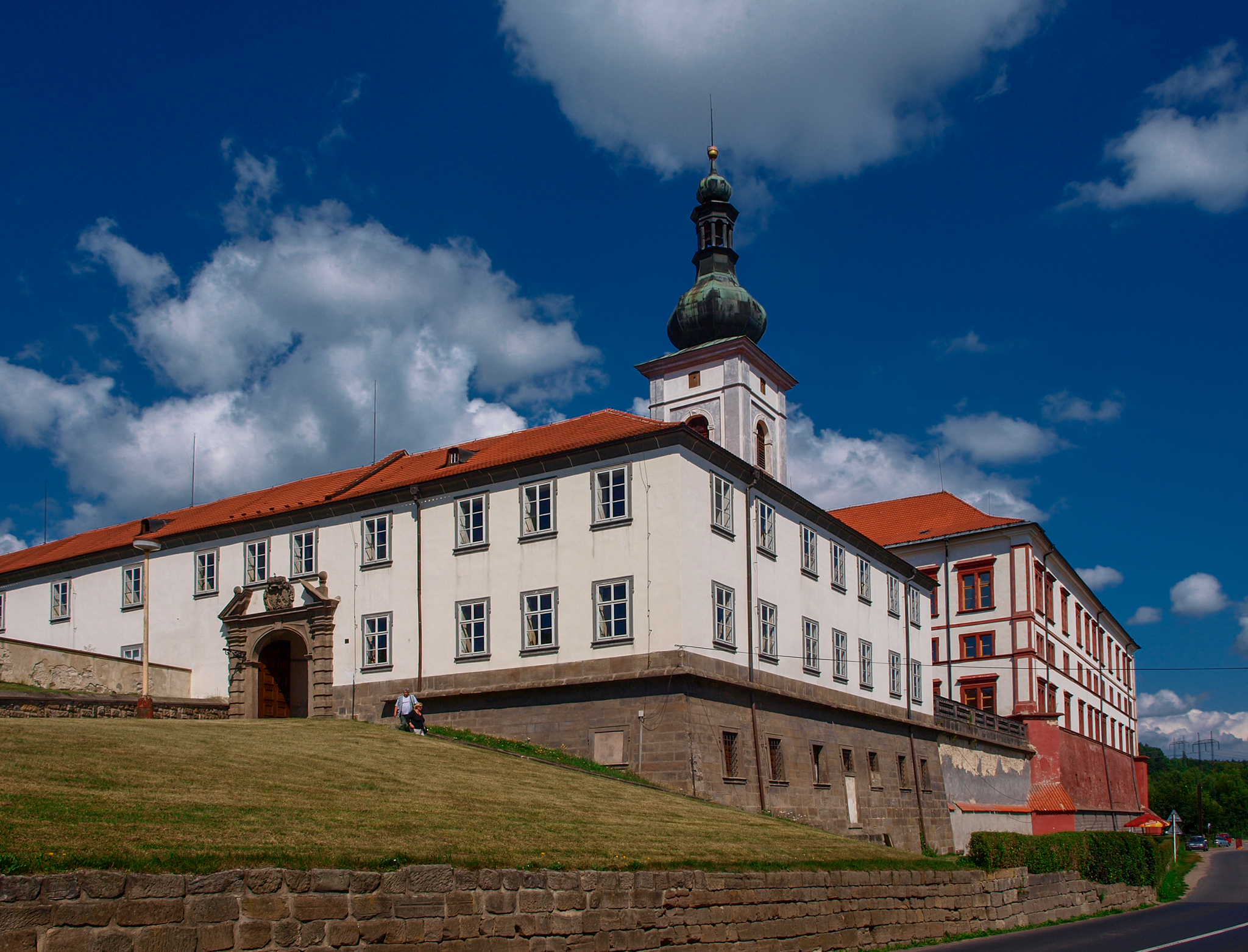
Zákupy Castle, another Anna Maria's residence in northern Bohemia

Cosimo III de' Medici coaxed his son into marrying Anna Maria Franziska for dynastic purposes; she was very wealthy, and brought a possible claim to the Duchy of Saxe-Lauenburg through her father. The Medici family needed an heir, as Gian Gastone's brother, Ferdinando III, had not produced a child. They were married on 2 July 1697 by the Bishop of Osnabruck at Düsseldorf but they lived in the Kingdom of Bohemia, at chateaux of Ploskovice (Ploschkowitz) and Zákupy (Reichstadt).

The new Princess of Tuscany had sprawling estates in the region. At the time of their marriage, contemporaries described the princess as "appalling and immensely fat". Anna Maria Franziska dominated her weak husband, which drove him into the arms of alcohol. He deplored her behaviour, "capriciousness, peevish faces and sharp words". Gian Gastone stayed with his wife for a mere ten months, before fleeing to Prague. The princess refused to leave Reichstadt, despite her husband's constant protestations. She believed that the Medici were in the habit of murdering their consorts.

The Grand Duke attempted to force his daughter-in-law to move back to Tuscany with Gian Gastone. He asked the Pope, Clement XI, to send the Archbishop of Prague to reproach her, and convince her to fulfil her wifely obligations. She replied that there was no point because Gian Gastone was "absolutely impotent". He left without her in 1708. Ferdinando, the heir to the collapsing grand duchy, died in 1713. Therefore, she became the Grand Princess of Tuscany.

=== Later life ===
Gian Gastone became Grand Duke of Tuscany in 1723, and, she, the Grand Duchess. Her husband continued to live in Florence, Tuscany's capital, and never saw his wife again. Gian Gastone lived a frivolous life there, staying up all night and waking up in the afternoon. As Grand Duchess, Anna Maria Franziska kept to her life of solitude at her castle, where she talked to the horses in the stables. Gian Gastone died in 1737. As the Medici had no male heir, Francis Stephen of Lorraine (later Holy Roman Emperor) ascended the grand ducal throne. She died in 1741.

== Ancestry ==
Ancestors of Anna Maria Franziska of Saxe-Lauenburg

16. Francis I, Duke of Saxe-Lauenburg
8. Francis II, Duke of Saxe-Lauenburg
17. Sybille of Saxony
4. Julius Henry, Duke of Saxe-Lauenburg
18. Julius, Duke of Brunswick-Lüneburg
9. Duchess Maria of Brunswick-Lüneburg
19. Margravine Hedwig of Brandenburg
2. Julius Francis, Duke of Saxe-Lauenburg
20. Oldřich Felix Popel z Lobkowicz
10. Vilém mladší Lobkowicz
21. Anna Alžběta z Hradce
5. Baroness Anna Magdalene von Lobkowitz
22. Adam Havel Lobkowicz
11. Kateřina Benigna Popelovna Lobkowicz
23. Marguerite de Mollart
1. Anna Maria Franziska of Saxe-Lauenburg
24. Philip Louis, Count Palatine of Neuburg
12. Augustus, Count Palatine of Sulzbach
25. Anna of Cleves
6. Christian Augustus, Count Palatine of Sulzbach
26. John Adolf, Duke of Holstein-Gottorp
13. Princess Hedwig of Schleswig-Holstein-Gottorp
27. Princess Augusta of Denmark
3. Countess Palatine Maria Hedwig of Sulzbach
28. John VI, Count of Nassau-Dillenburg
14. John VII, Count of Nassau-Siegen
29. Landgravine Elisabeth of Leuchtenberg
7. Countess Amalie of Nassau-Siegen
30. John II, Duke of Schleswig-Holstein-Sonderburg
15. Margaret of Schleswig-Holstein-Sonderburg
31. Duchess Elisabeth of Brunswick-Grubenhagen

== See also ==
- Grand Duchy of Tuscany
- House of Medici
- Cosimo III de' Medici, Grand Duke of Tuscany

== Notes and references ==
Anna Maria Franziska of Saxe-Lauenburg House of Ascania Born: 13 June 1673 Died: 15 October 1741
Italian royalty
Preceded by Marguerite Louise d'Orléans	Grand Duchess consort of Tuscany; 1723–1737	Succeeded by Maria Theresa of Austria
