= Milštejn Castle =

Milštejn
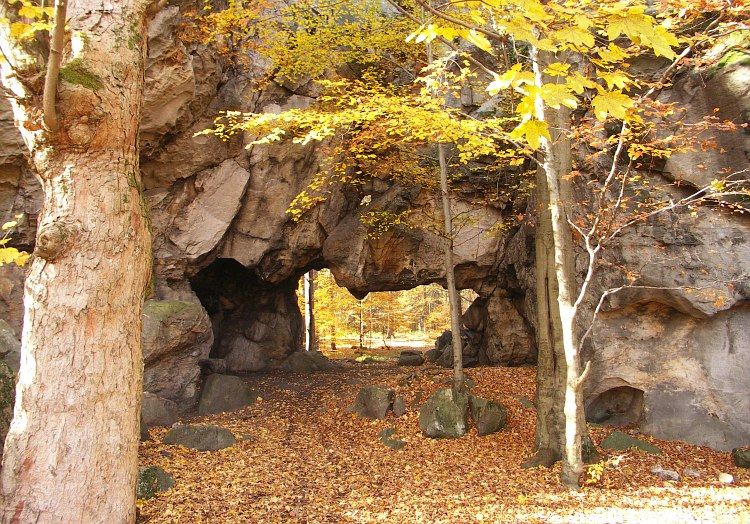
- The rock gate at Milštejn

- Location within Czech Republic

General information
- Type: Medieval castle
- Architectural style: Gothic architecture
- Location: Cvikov, Liberec Region, Czech Republic, Czech Republic
- Coordinates: 50°48′41″N 14°37′58″E
- Elevation: 562 m (1,844 ft)
- Owner: Czech State

Milštejn (Czech: hrad Milštejn, German: Mühlstein) are the remaining ruins of a castle in the north of the Czech Republic. The ruins are located in the Lusatian Mountains at an altitude of 562 m, about 3.5 km north from the town of Cvikov. The exact date when the castle was built is unknown. Based on the surrounding sites, it is assumed that the castle was founded between the 13th and 14th centuries to protect the country trail leading from Lípa to Zittau. The first known owners of the castle were Berka of Dubá, a prominent cadet branch of a Bohemian noble family.

== History ==
In the second half of the 13th century in the northern part of Bohemia, along the Leipzig trade route, the Lords of Warttenberg and Ronow built fortified settlements (Sloup, Vartenberk, Lemberk, Lipý, Frýdlant and others). It is documented by archaeological finds that at that time, Milštejn was built on the communication route between Sloup and Oybin.

== Gallery ==
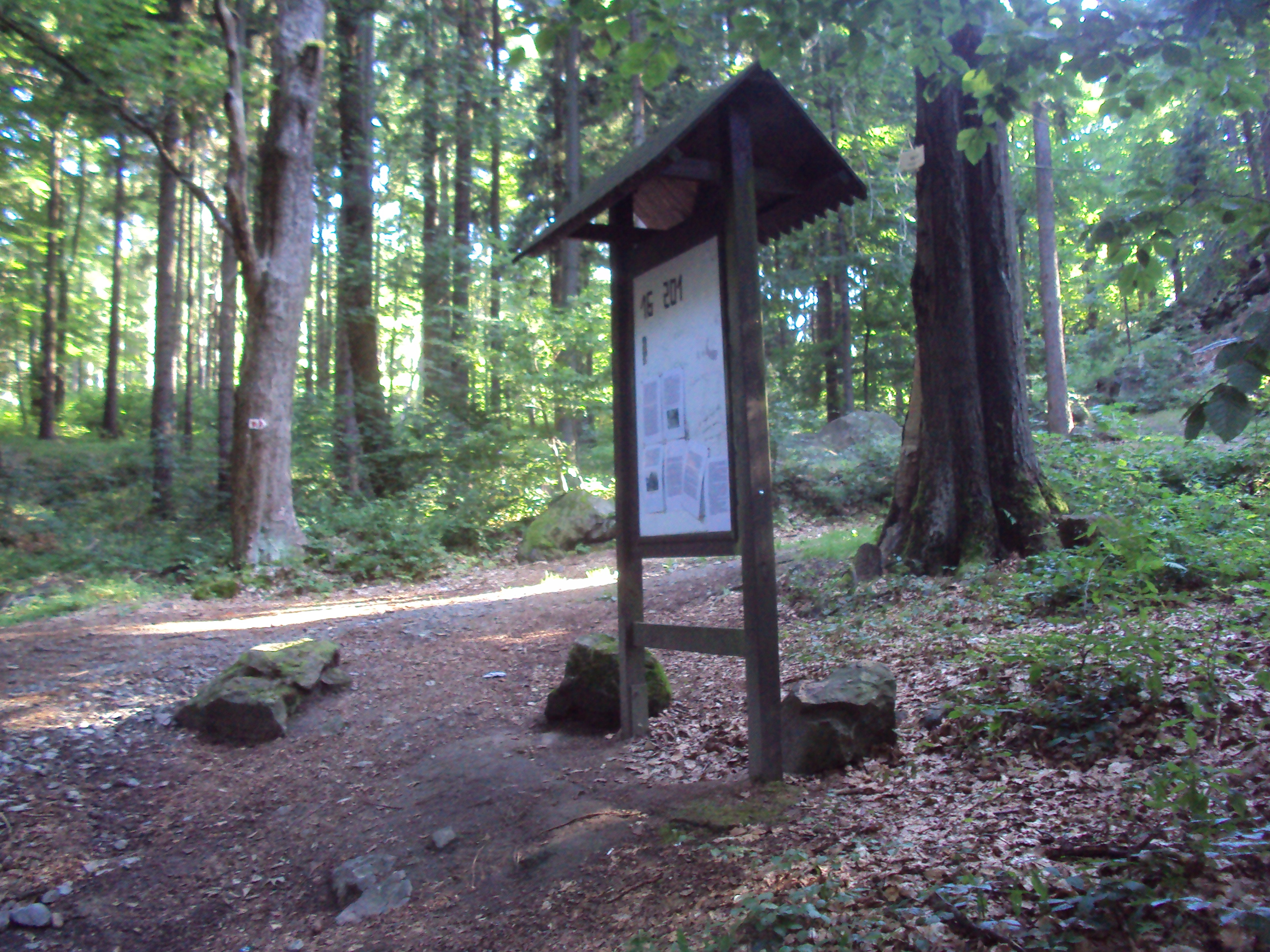
An information board below the castle ruins

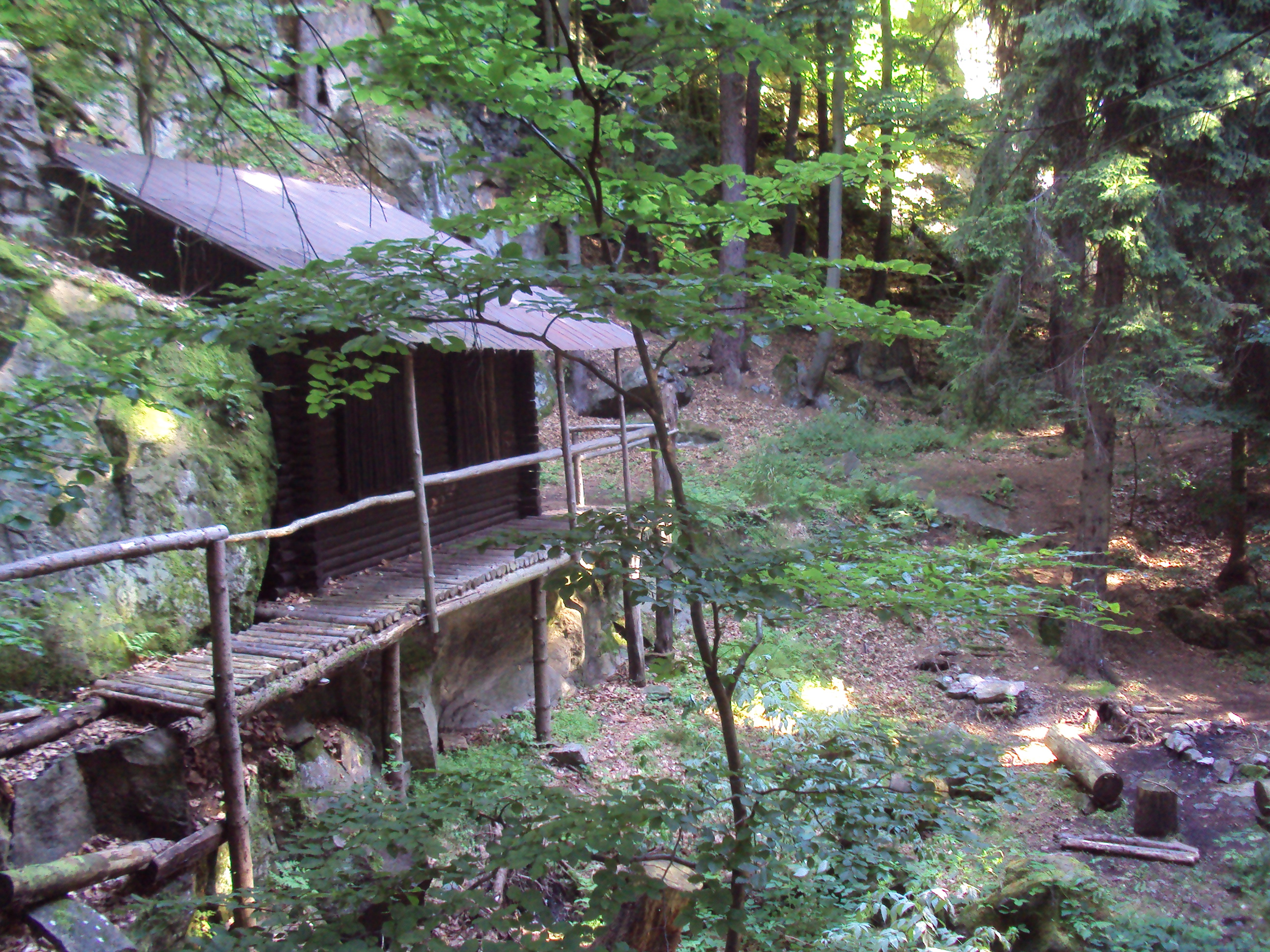
A small hut below the peak of the rock

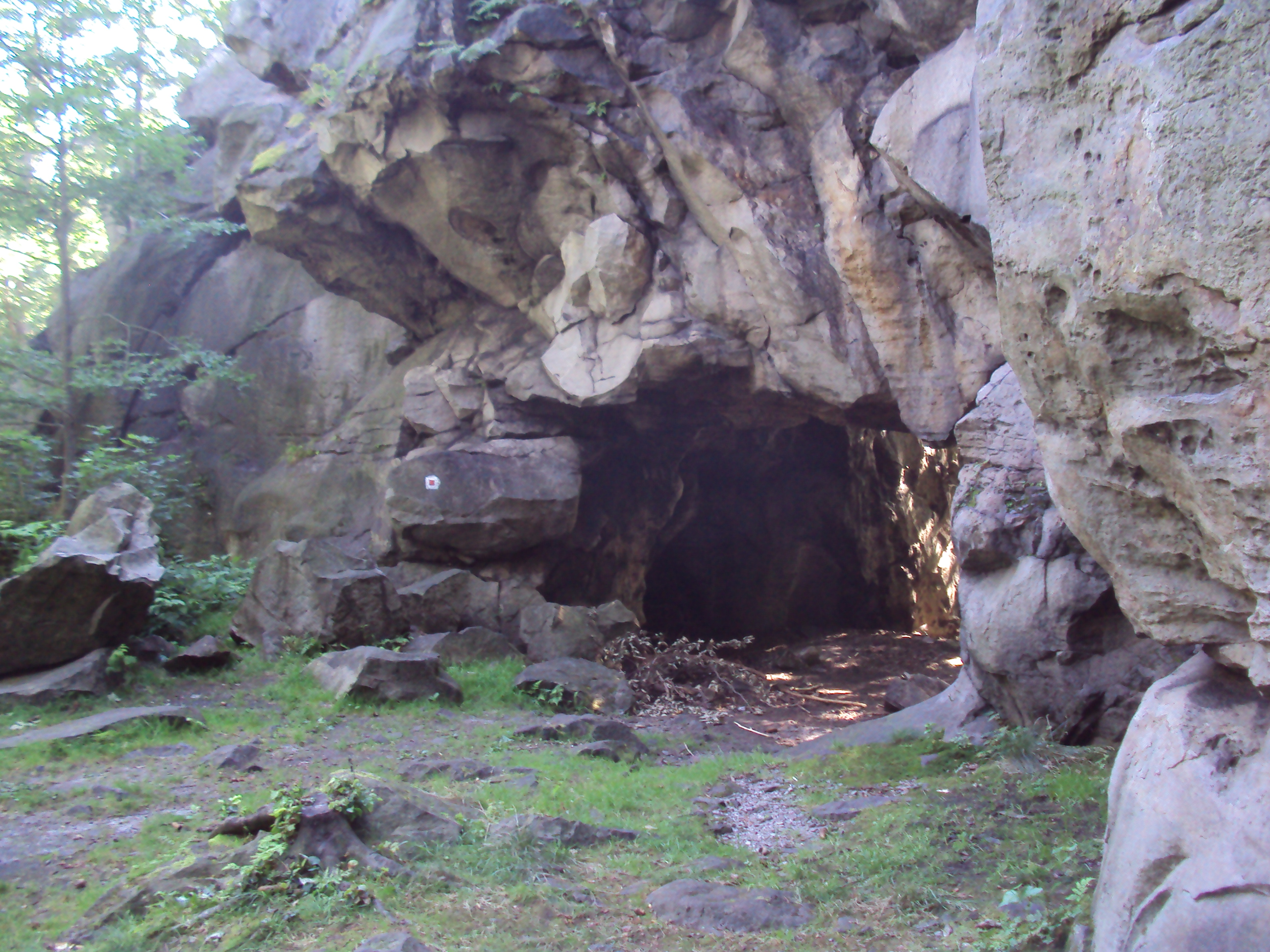
The entrance to the castle

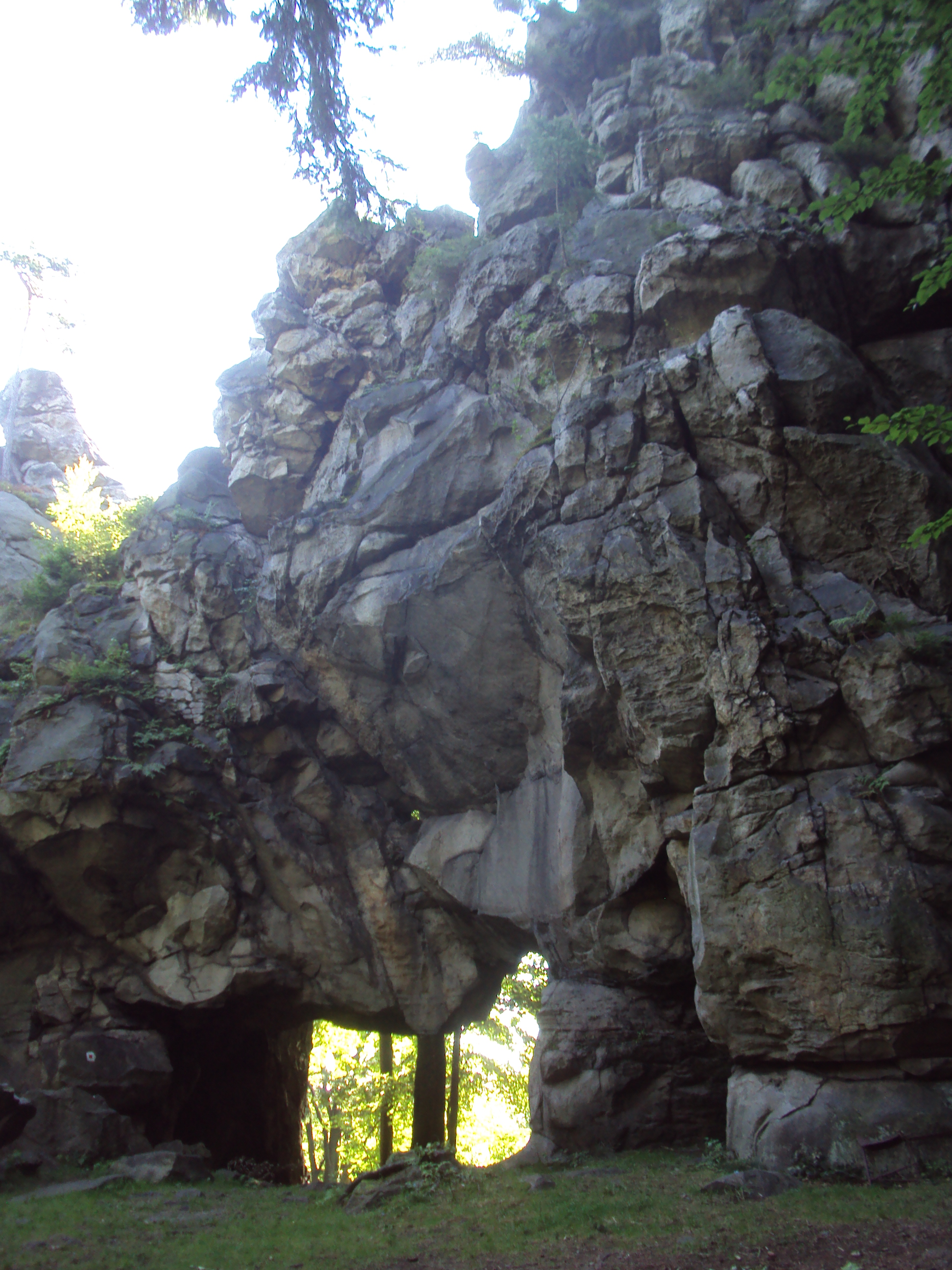
The opposite entrance to the castle

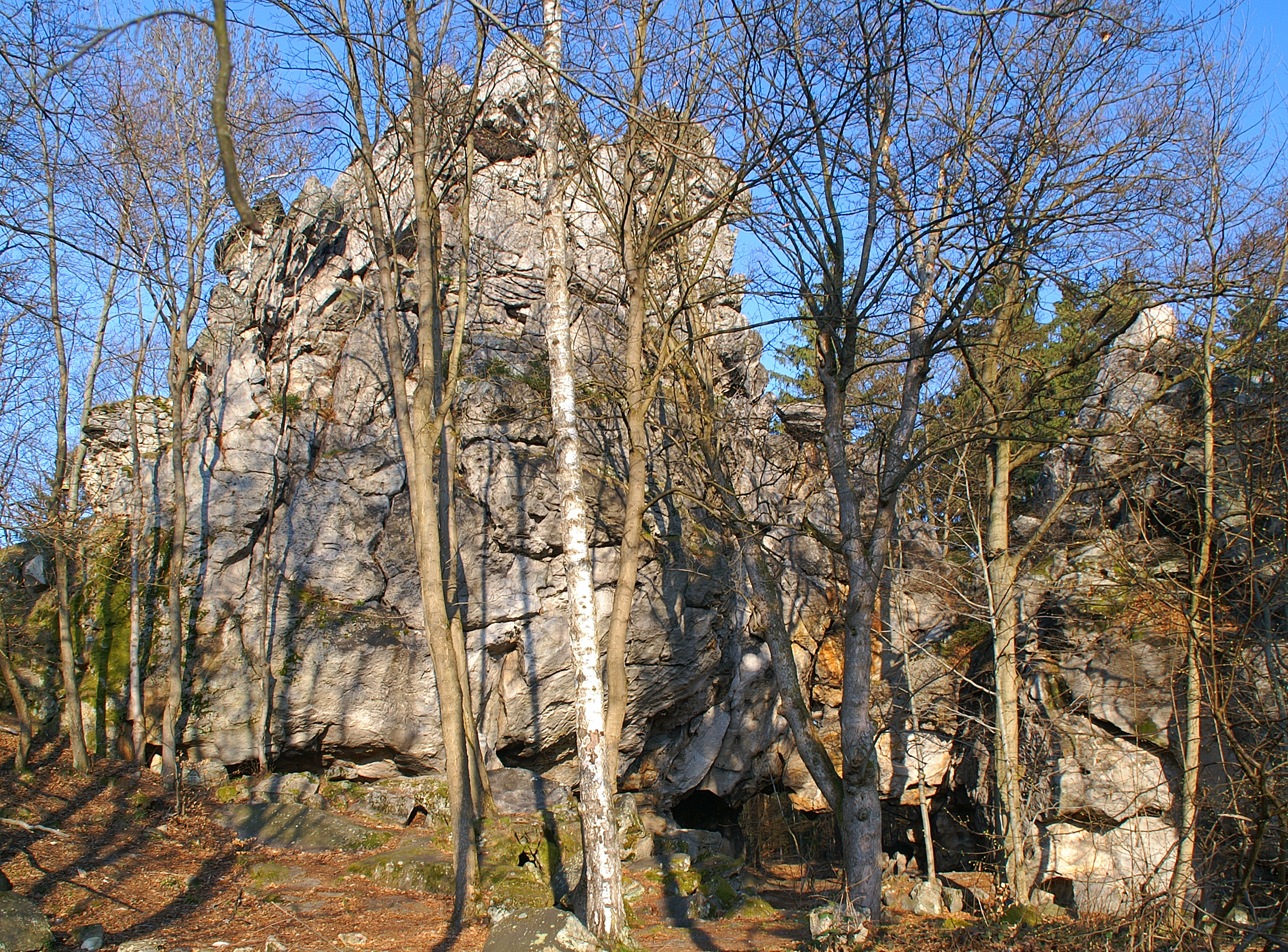
The ruins of the Milštejn castle

== See also ==
- List of castles in the Czech Republic
- History of the Czech lands in the Middle Ages
