= Philip William Augustus of Neuburg =

Eighth son of Elector Palatine Philip William

Philip William August, Count Palatine of Neuburg
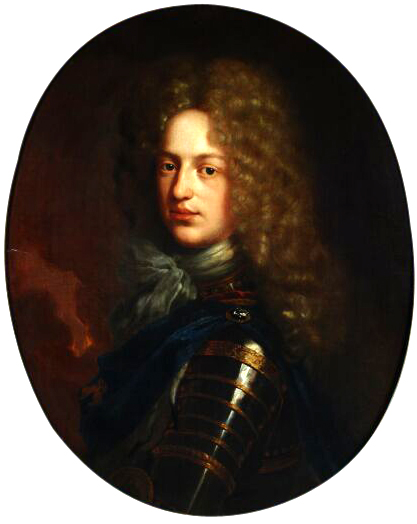
- Portrait by Pieter van der Werff, c. 1690
- Born: 19 November 1668; Neuburg an der Donau
- Died: 5 April 1693 (aged 24); Zákupy
- Spouse: Anna Maria Franziska of Saxe-Lauenburg
- Issue Detail: Countess Palatine Maria Anna of Neuburg
- House: House of Wittelsbach
- Father: Philip William, Elector Palatine
- Mother: Elisabeth Amalie of Hesse-Darmstadt

Philip William August, Count Palatine of Neuburg (born 19 November 1668 in Neuburg an der Donau; died: 5 April 1693 in Zákupy (German: Reichstadt)) was a Prince and Count Palatine of Neuburg.

== Life ==
Philip William August was the 13th from a total of 17 children of Elector Palatine Philip William (1615-1690) from his second marriage to Elisabeth Amalie (1635-1709), a daughter of Landgrave George II of Hesse-Darmstadt.

His oldest sister, Eleonor Magdalene married Emperor Leopold I in 1676. In August 1689, after he had visited his brother in Breslau and his sister in Vienna, Philip William began his Grand Tour to Italy.

Philip William August chose a secular career and entered into active military service. He died at the age of 24 after suffering for seven days from a "malignant fever" and was buried in the parish church of Zákupy. His heart lies in the Court Church in Neuburg on the Danube.

== Marriage and issue ==
He married on 29 October 1690 in Raudnitz Anna Maria Franziska (1672–1741), a daughter of Duke Julius Francis of Saxe-Lauenburg. The wedding ceremony, which had to be postponed due to the illness and death of Philip William August's father, was carried out "plainly". His marriage brought Philipp Wilhelm August the following children:

- Leopoldine Eleanor (1691–1693).
- Maria Anna Carolina (1693–1751), married in 1719 Prince Ferdinand of Bavaria (1699–1738).

== Ancestry ==
Ancestors of Philip William Augustus of Neuburg

16. Wolfgang, Count Palatine of Zweibrücken
8. Philip Louis, Count Palatine of Neuburg
17. Landgravine Anna of Hesse
4. Wolfgang Wilhelm, Count Palatine of Neuburg
18. William, Duke of Jülich-Cleves-Berg
9. Anna of Cleves
19. Archduchess Maria of Austria
2. Philipp Wilhelm, Elector Palatine
20. Albert V, Duke of Bavaria
10. William V, Duke of Bavaria
21. Archduchess Anna of Austria
5. Duchess Magdalene of Bavaria
22. Francis I, Duke of Lorraine
11. Duchess Renata of Lorraine
23. Princess Christina of Denmark and Norway
1. Philip William August, Count Palatine of Neuburg
24. George I, Landgrave of Hesse-Darmstadt
12. Louis V, Landgrave of Hesse-Darmstadt
25. Countess Magdalene of Lippe
6. George II, Landgrave of Hesse-Darmstadt
26. John George, Elector of Brandenburg
13. Margravine Magdalena of Brandenburg
27. Princess Elisabeth of Anhalt-Zerbst
3. Landgravine Elisabeth Amalie of Hesse-Darmstadt
28. Christian I, Elector of Saxony
14. John George I, Elector of Saxony
29. Margravine Sophie of Brandenburg
7. Princess Sophia Eleonore of Saxony
30. Albert Frederick, Duke of Prussia
15. Duchess Magdalene Sibylle of Prussia
31. Duchess Marie Eleonore of Cleves
