= Velenice (Česká Lípa District) =

- Municipality
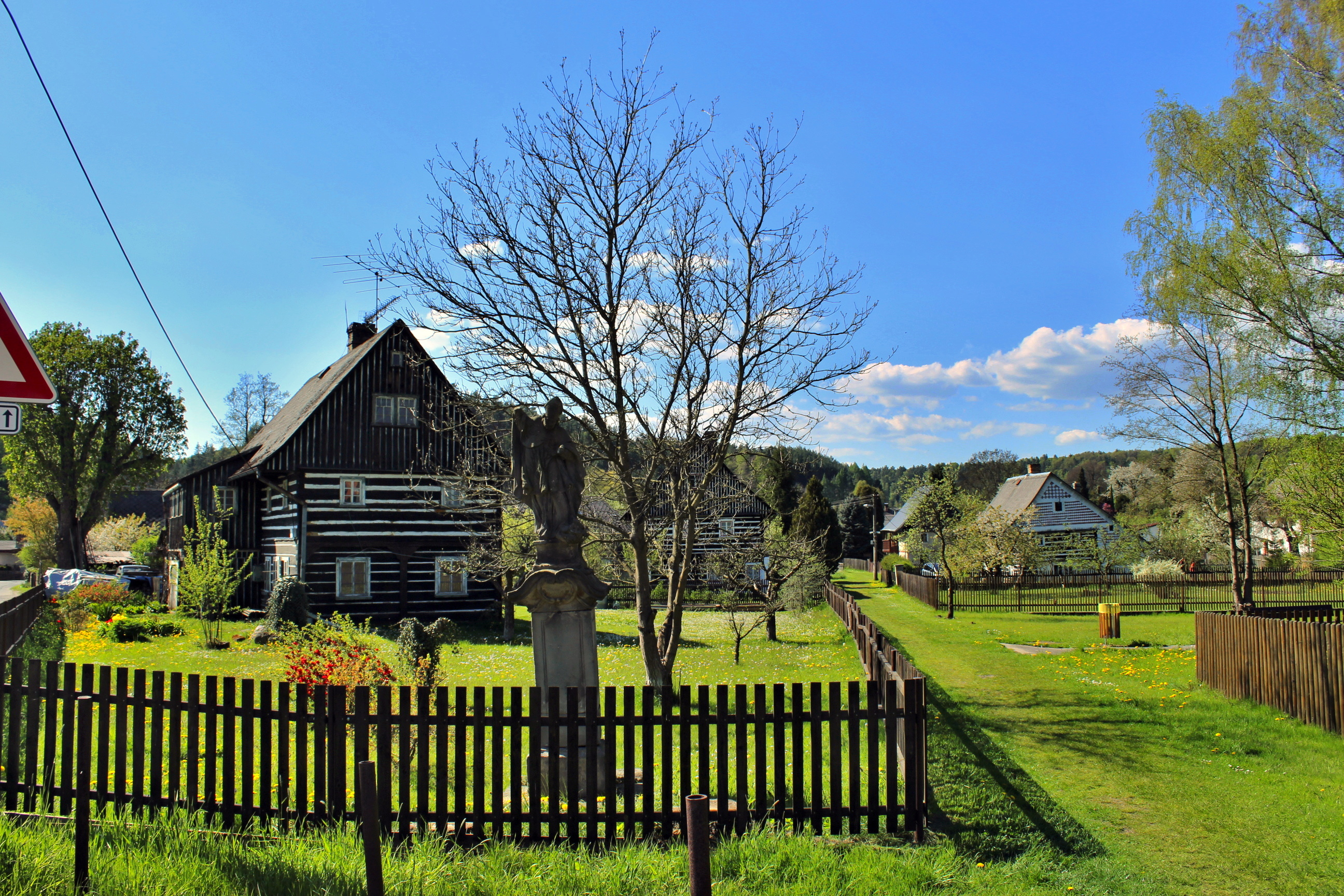
- Folk architecture houses

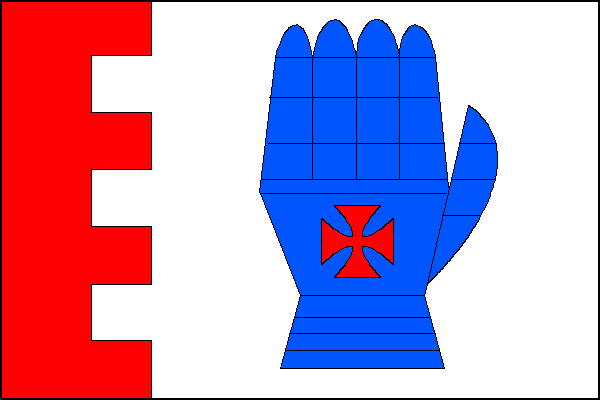
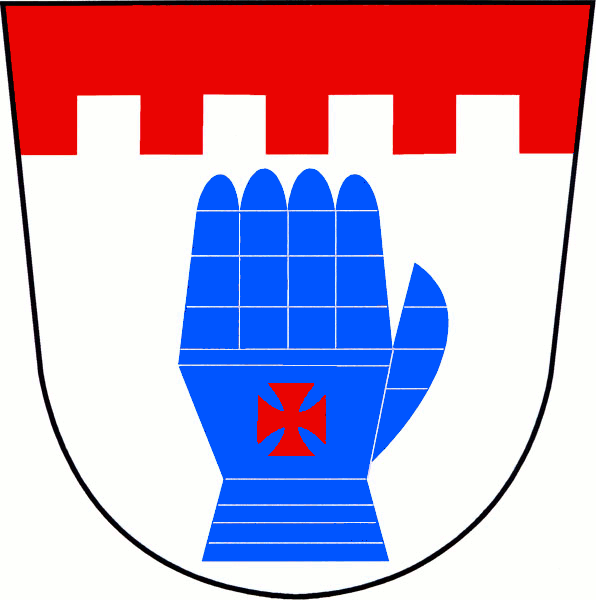
- Flag Coat of arms

- Location in the Czech Republic
- Coordinates: 50°43′9″N 14°39′50″E
- Country: Czech Republic
- Region: Liberec
- District: Česká Lípa
- First mentioned: 1399

Area
  - Total: 7.18 km^{2} (2.77 sq mi)
- Elevation: 278 m (912 ft)

Population (2026-01-01)
  - Total: 172
  - Density: 24.0/km^{2} (62.0/sq mi)
- Time zone: UTC+1 (CET)
  - Summer (DST): UTC+2 (CEST)
- Postal code: 471 23
- Website: www.velenice-cl.cz

Velenice (German: Wellnitz) is a municipality and village in Česká Lípa District in the Liberec Region of the Czech Republic. It has about 200 inhabitants.

== Etymology ==
The name is derived from the personal name Velen, meaning "the village of Velen's people".

== Geography ==
Velenice is located about 9 kilometres (6 mi) northeast of Česká Lípa and 27 km (17 mi) west of Liberec. It lies in the Ralsko Uplands. The highest point is the hill Velenický kopec at 417 m (1,368 ft) above sea level. The Svitavka River flows through the municipality.

== History ==
The first written mention of Velenice is from 1399. In 1479, Velenice was bought by the Berka of Dubá family. They annexed Velenice to the Sloup estate in 1502. In 1616, the Berkas of Dubá sold the village to the Salhauz family. Their properties were confiscated as a result of their participation in the Bohemian Revolt. Velenice then often changed hands, which lasted until 1710, when the village was acquired by the Kinsky family. They owned the village until the establishment of an independent municipality in 1850.

== Demographics ==
Historical population

| Year | Pop. | ±% |
|---|---|---|
| 1869 | 850 | — |
| 1880 | 826 | −2.8% |
| 1890 | 665 | −19.5% |
| 1900 | 588 | −11.6% |
| 1910 | 539 | −8.3% |

| Year | Pop. | ±% |
|---|---|---|
| 1921 | 477 | −11.5% |
| 1930 | 495 | +3.8% |
| 1950 | 299 | −39.6% |
| 1961 | 323 | +8.0% |
| 1970 | 281 | −13.0% |

| Year | Pop. | ±% |
|---|---|---|
| 1980 | 211 | −24.9% |
| 1991 | 156 | −26.1% |
| 2001 | 177 | +13.5% |
| 2011 | 169 | −4.5% |
| 2021 | 170 | +0.6% |

Source: Censuses

== Transport ==
There are no railways or major roads passing through the municipality.

== Sights ==
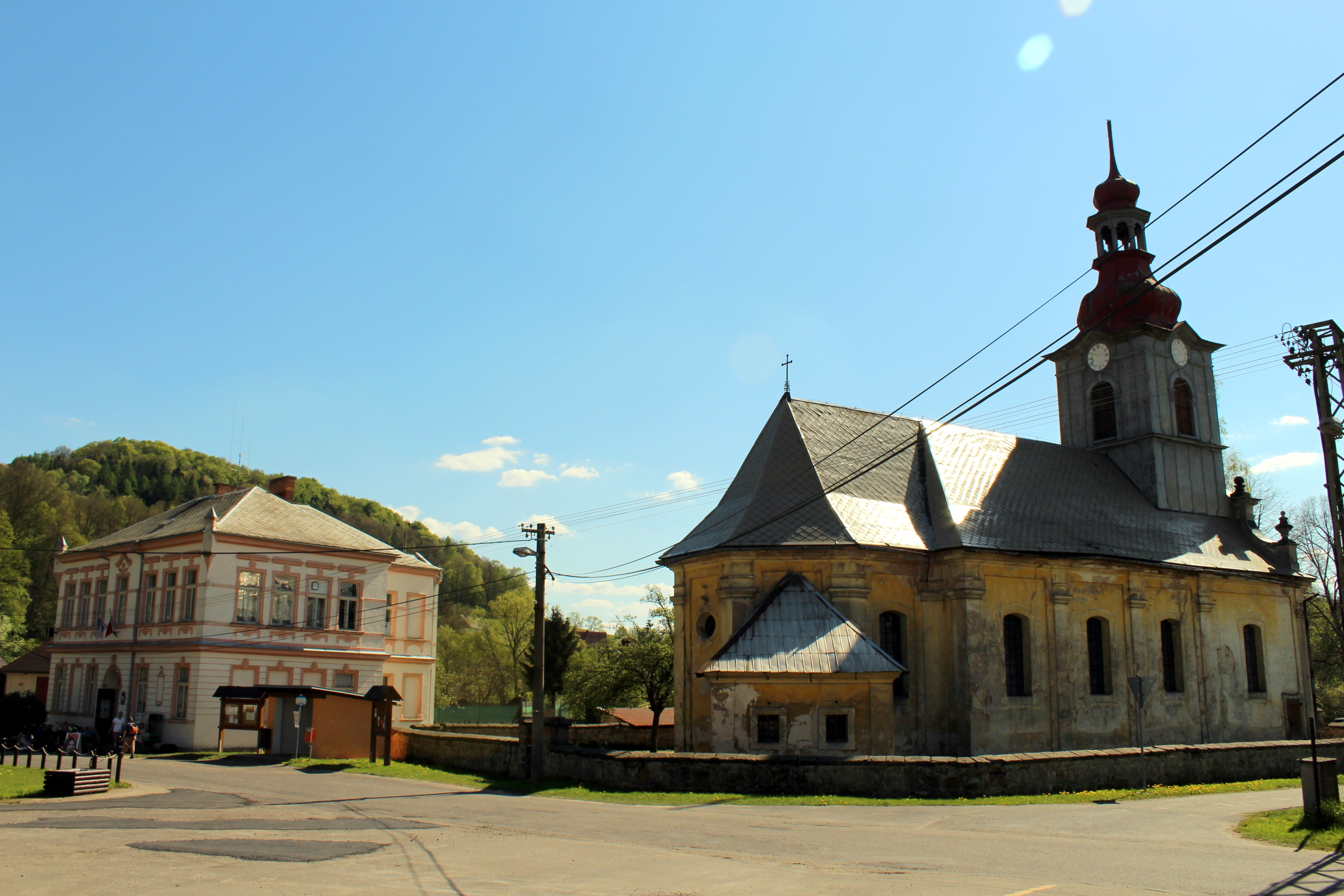
Centre of Velenice with the Church of the Holy Trinity and municipal office

The main landmark of Velenice is the Church of the Holy Trinity. It was built in the Baroque style in 1735. In the second half of the 20th century, the church fell into disrepair and the valuable Baroque interior was damaged.

The entire built-up area is protected as a village monument zone for its set of well-preserved timbered, half-timbered and brick houses, mainly from the 18th and 19th centuries.
