= Kunratice u Cvikova =

- Municipality
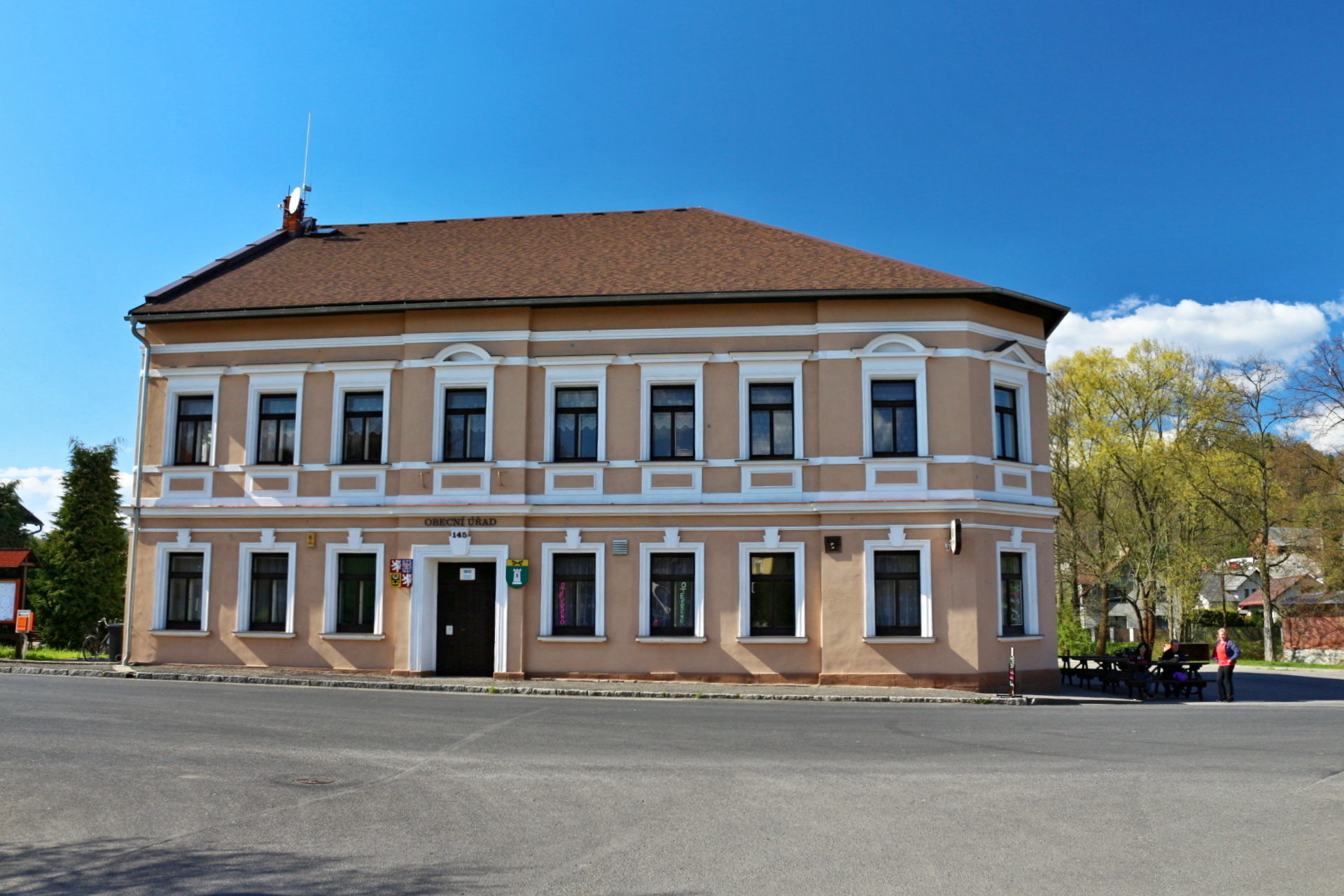
- Municipal office

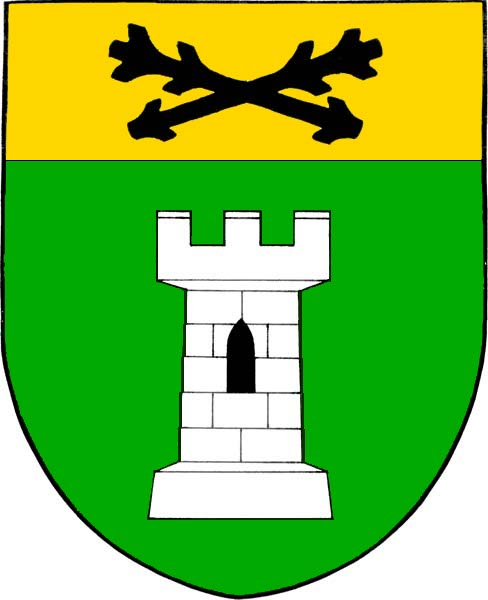
- Flag Coat of arms

- Location in the Czech Republic
- Coordinates: 50°46′7″N 14°40′43″E
- Country: Czech Republic
- Region: Liberec
- District: Česká Lípa
- First mentioned: 1296

Area
  - Total: 12.52 km^{2} (4.83 sq mi)
- Elevation: 318 m (1,043 ft)

Population (2026-01-01)
  - Total: 626
  - Density: 50.0/km^{2} (129/sq mi)
- Time zone: UTC+1 (CET)
  - Summer (DST): UTC+2 (CEST)
- Postal code: 471 55
- Website: www.kunraticeucvikova.eu

Kunratice u Cvikova (German: Kunnersdorf) is a municipality and village in Česká Lípa District in the Liberec Region of the Czech Republic. It has about 600 inhabitants.

== Etymology ==
The name is derived from the personal name Kunrát (a variation of the name Konrád), meaning "the village of Kunrát's people".

== Geography ==
Kunratice u Cvikova is located about 13 kilometres (8 mi) northeast of Česká Lípa and 25 km (16 mi) west of Liberec. It lies in the Ralsko Uplands. The highest point is the hill Dubina at 467 m (1,532 ft) above sea level. The northern half of the municipal territory lies within the Lusatian Mountains Protected Landscape Area. The Svitavka River flows through Kunratice u Cvikova. There are three fishponds in the municipality.

== History ==
The first written mention of Kunratice u Cvikova is from 1296. The village was probably founded around 1278. In 1388, the village was acquired by the Berka of Dubá family and incorporated it under the Milštejn estate.

== Demographics ==
Historical population

Year	Pop.	±%
1869	2,164	—
1880	2,255	+4.2%
1890	2,018	−10.5%
1900	1,943	−3.7%
1910	1,957	+0.7%

Year	Pop.	±%
1921	1,640	−16.2%
1930	1,572	−4.1%
1950	703	−55.3%
1961	693	−1.4%
1970	685	−1.2%

Year	Pop.	±%
1980	619	−9.6%
1991	483	−22.0%
2001	535	+10.8%
2011	592	+10.7%
2021	598	+1.0%

Source: Censuses

== Transport ==
The I/13 road (the section from Liberec to Děčín, which is a part of the European route E442) runs through the municipality.

== Sights ==
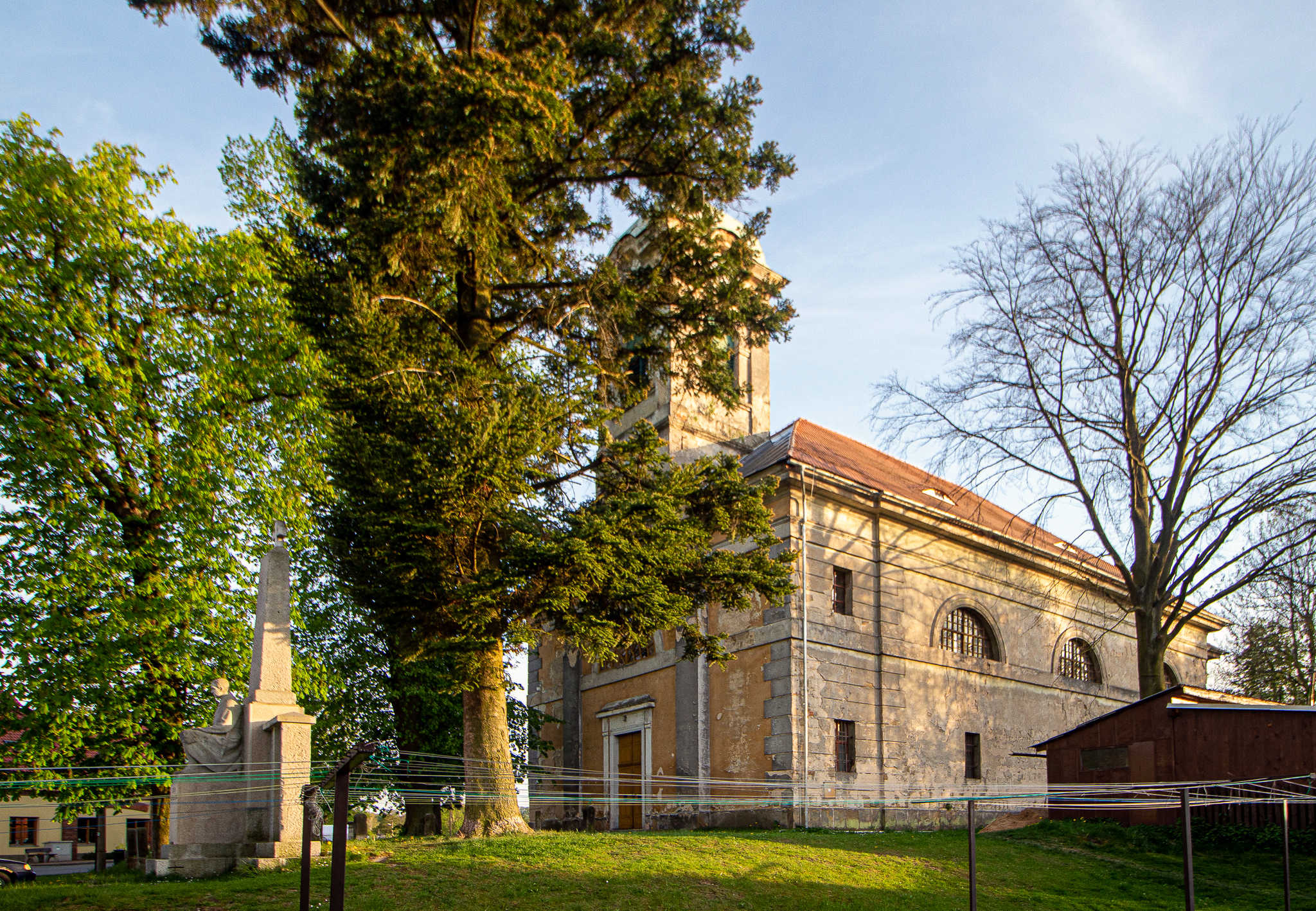
Exaltation of the Holy Cross

The Church of the Exaltation of the Holy Cross was built in the Empire style in 1833. In 2021, a valuable Holy Sepulchre (symbolic depiction of Christ's tomb) decorated with glass was discovered in the church.

In the centre of the village stands a colourful cast iron statue of Emperor Joseph II from 1882.
