= Svitavka =

River in the Czech Republic and Germany

Svitavka Zwittebach
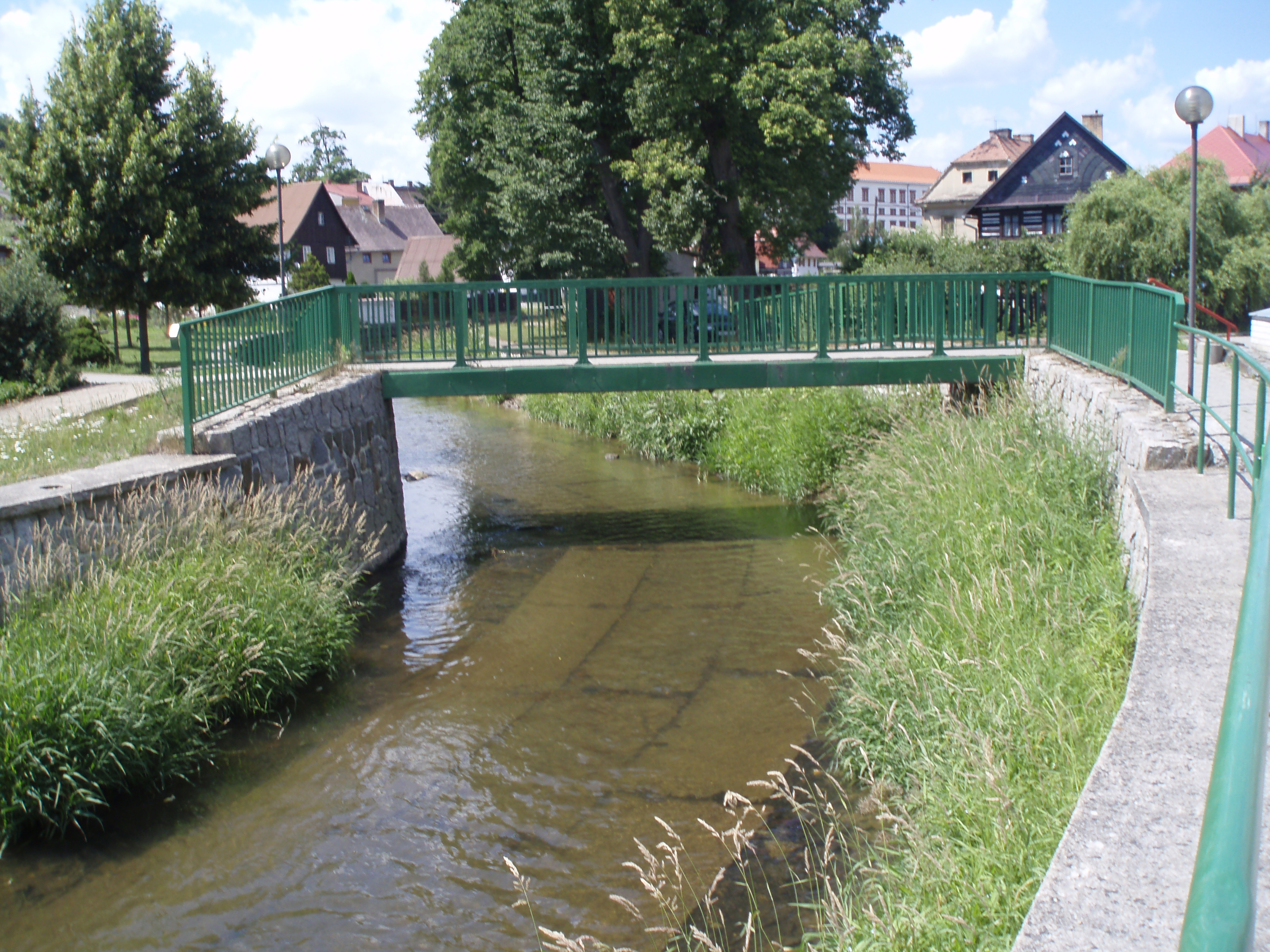
- The Svitavka in Zákupy

Location
- Countries: Czech Republic; Germany
- Region/ State: Liberec; Saxony

Physical characteristics
- Source
  - location: Jonsdorf, Lusatian Mountains
  - coordinates: 50°51′8″N 14°40′25″E
  - elevation: 586 m (1,923 ft)
- Mouth
  - location: Ploučnice
  - coordinates: 50°39′36″N 14°37′31″E
  - elevation: 254 m (833 ft)
- Length: 37.1 km (23.1 mi)
- Basin size: 132.5 km^{2} (51.2 sq mi)
- Discharge
  - average: 1.16 m^{3}/s (41 cu ft/s) near estuary

Basin features
- Progression: Ploučnice→ Elbe→ North Sea

The Svitavka (also called Svitávka; German: Zwittebach) is a river in the Czech Republic and Germany, a right tributary of the Ploučnice. It flows mostly through the Liberec Region in the Czech Republic, but it originates in Saxony in Germany. It is 37.1 km (23.1 mi) long.

== Etymology ==
The name referred to the clear water of the river and was derived from svítat, which meant '[be] clear' in Old Czech. Svitavka/Svitávka is a diminutive form of Svitava (a village, today a part of Cvikov). The river was called Svitávka until the 1990s, when it was officially renamed Svitavka, but it is still often called Svitávka.

== Characteristic ==
The Svitavka originates in the territory of Jonsdorf in the Lusatian Mountains at an elevation of 586 m (1,923 ft) and flows to Česká Lípa-Vlčí Důl, where it merges with the Ploučnice River at an elevation of 254 m (833 ft). It is 37.1 km (23.1 mi) long, of which 36.3 km (22.6 mi) is in the Czech Republic. Its drainage basin has an area of 132.5 km^{2} (51.2 sq mi).

The longest tributaries of the Svitavka are:

Tributary	Length (km)	Side
Boberský potok	11.9	right
Hamerský potok	9.2	right

== Course ==
The Svitavka originates in Jonsdorf in Germany and then continues in the Czech Republic through the territories of Mařenice, Krompach, Kunratice u Cvikova, Cvikov, Velenice, Zákupy and Česká Lípa.

== Nature ==
The upper course of the Svitavka is located in the protected landscape area of Lužické hory. The mouth of the river is located in the protected landscape area of Kokořínsko – Máchův kraj.

According to a 2016 study, nine species of aquatic water molluscs (four species of gastropods and five species of bivalves) occur in the river. Notable is the population of Pisidium amnicum and Pisidium tenuilineatum, which are endangered species within the Czech Republic. Their presence is an indicator of clean water.

== See also ==
- List of rivers of the Czech Republic
- List of rivers of Saxony
