= Joseph Ferdinand Maria of Salern =

German nobleman and general (1718–1805)

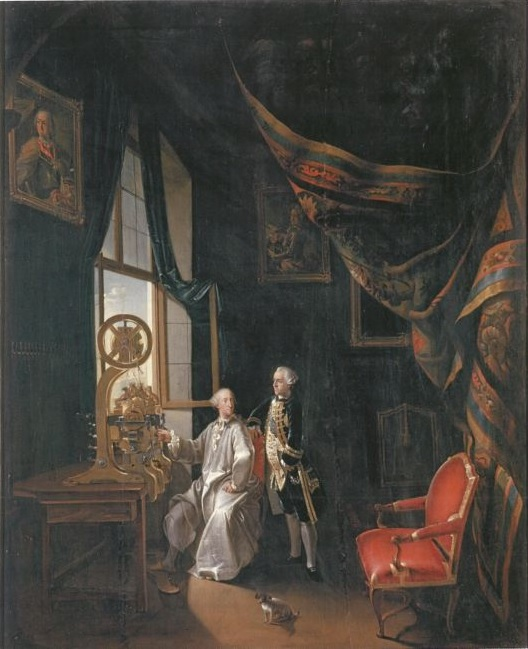
- Double portrait of Elector Maximilian III Joseph of Bavaria and Count Joseph of Salern, by Johann Jakob Dorner the Elder, 1765
- Born: 1718; Berg bei Kling, Upper Bavaria
- Died: 7 December 1805 (aged 86–87); Munich, Kingdom of Bavaria
- Noble family: House of Wittelsbach
- Spouses: Marie Mechthildis of Törring-Seefeld; Josepha of La Rosee
- Issue: Maximilian; Maria Josepha; Adelaide
- Father: Ferdinand Maria Innocenz of Bavaria
- Mother: Countess Marie Adelheid Fortunata of Spaur

Count Ferdinand Joseph Maria of Salern (1718 – 7 December 1805) was an illegitimate son of Prince Ferdinand Maria Innocenz of Bavaria (1699-1738) and Countess Marie Adelheid Fortunata of Spaur. He was thus a nephew of Emperor Charles VII and his brothers Clemens Augustus, elector and archbishop of Cologne, and Cardinal Johann Theodore, bishop of Freising, Regensburg and Liège.

Salern owned the Lordship of Geltolfing near Straubing. During the Napoleonic Wars, he served as a general of the artillery. From 1804, he had his own infantry regiment "Count Salern", which had been formed from the Royal Bavarian Infantry Regiment No. 4 "King William of Württemberg".

As the General Intendant for music at the Bavarian court, he was a patron of Wolfgang Amadeus Mozart. In 1779, he was elected as a full member of the Bavarian Academy of Sciences and Humanities. In the painting at the top of this article, he is represented as a trusted friend of his cousin Maximilian III Joseph, in the "woodturning" cabinet at Nymphenburg Palace.

== Marriages and issue ==
Salern was married twice. His first marriage was to Countess Marie Mechthildis of Törring-Seefeld (1734–1764). He had a son with her;

- Maximilian of Salern. (b. 1763 - d. c. 1810) Never married or had issue. With his death, the Salern line died out.

His second wife was Countess Josepha of La Rosee (died 1772). With her, he had two daughters;

- Maria Josepha (b. 13 December 1766 - d. 14 March 1830) Married twice, first to Peter Heinrich von Vieregg-Pittersdorf, second to Karl Theodor Sebastian von Halberg.
- Maria Anna Adelaide (b. 4 May 1771 - d. 22 August 1792) married Carl Eligius Elazarus Joseph Maria Freiherr von Strommer.
