= Hedwig of Sulzbach =

Duchess of Saxe-Lauenburg (1650–1681)

Marie Hedwig Auguste of the Palatinate-Sulzbach
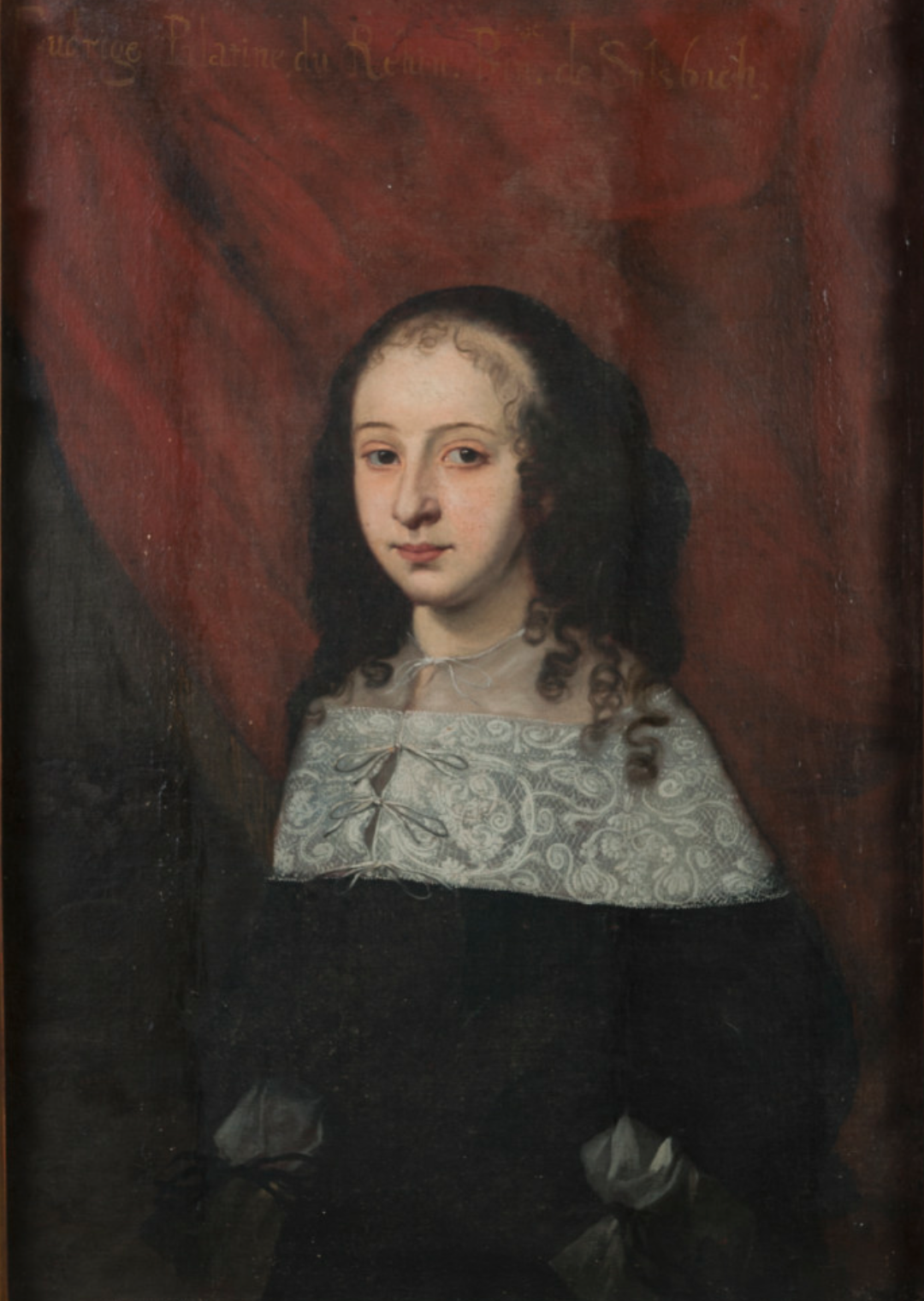
- Born: 15 April 1650; Sulzbach
- Died: 23 November 1681 (aged 31); Hamburg
- Burial: White Castle at Ostrov
- Spouse: Sigismund Francis, Archduke of Austria; Julius Francis, Duke of Saxe-Lauenburg
- Issue Detail: Anna Maria Franziska, Grand Duchess of Tuscany; Sybille, Margravine of Baden-Baden
- House: House of Wittelsbach
- Father: Christian August, Count Palatine of Sulzbach
- Mother: Amalie of Nassau-Siegen

Marie Hedwig Auguste of Sulzbach (German: Marie Hedwig Auguste von Sulzbach; born: 15 April 1650 in Sulzbach; died: 23 November 1681 in Hamburg) was a Countess Palatine of Sulzbach by birth and by marriage, Archduchess of Austria and by her second marriage, Duchess of Saxe-Lauenburg.

== Early life ==
Hedwig was a daughter of the Duke and Count Palatine Christian August of Sulzbach (1622–1708) from his marriage to Countess Amalie of Nassau-Siegen (1613–1669), daughter of Count John VII of Nassau-Siegen.

== First marriage ==
Hedwig was married on 3 June 1665 per cura in the court chapel of Sulzbach to Archduke Sigismund Francis of Austria-Tyrol (1630–1665), who after his brother's unexpected death had resigned from his ecclesiastical positions in order to marry. The marriage was never consummated: while travelling to meet his bride, the Archduke fell seriously ill and died in Innsbruck twelve days after the marriage.

== Second marriage ==
Hedwig's second marriage, in Sulzbach on 9 April 1668, was with Duke Julius Francis of Saxe-Lauenburg (1641–1689). Her father had a memorial stone erected in the Sulzbach parish church to commemorate the event. Hedwig had been assured an annual income of 20000guilders at her first marriage; Julius Francis made a deal with the imperial court, in which Hedwig would receive a lump sum instead.

== Death ==
Hedwig died in 1681 and was buried in the White Castle at Ostrov (German: Schlackenwerth).

== Issue ==
Hedwig from her second marriage had the following children:

- Anna Maria Theresia (1670–1671)
- Anna Maria Franziska (1672–1741)

married firstly in 1690 Count Palatine Philip William of Neuburg (1668–1693)
married secondly 1697 Grand Duke Gian Gastone de' Medici of Tuscany (1671–1737)

- Sybille (1675–1733)

married in 1690 Margrave Louis William of Baden-Baden (1655–1707)

== Sources ==
- Greinert, Melanie (2018). Zwischen Unterordnung und Selbstbehauptung: Handlungsspielräume Gottorfer Fürstinnen (1564–1721) (in German). Murmann Publishers GmbH. ISBN 9783529094491.419
- Theologische Quartalschrift, vol. 50, H. Laupp, 1868, p. 106 Digitized
- Johann Samuel Ersch: Allgemeine Encyclopädie der Wissenschaften und Künste, section 2 part 28, J. f. Gleditsch, 1851, p. 363
