= Zákupy =

- Town
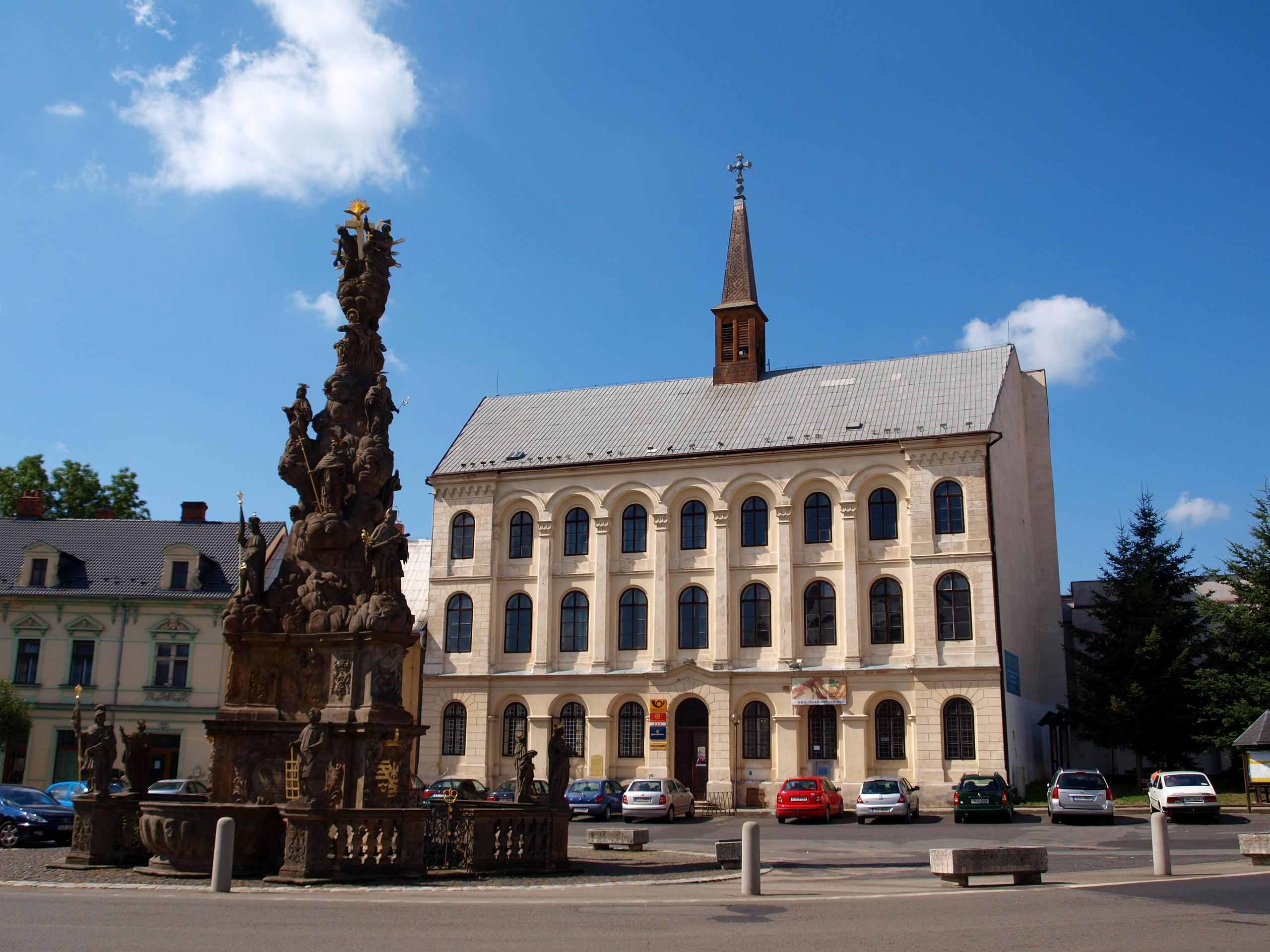
- The square Náměstí Svobody

- Flag Coat of arms

- Location in the Czech Republic
- Coordinates: 50°41′29″N 14°39′4″E
- Country: Czech Republic
- Region: Liberec
- District: Česká Lípa
- First mentioned: 1315

Government
  - Mayor: Radek Lípa

Area
  - Total: 40.78 km^{2} (15.75 sq mi)
- Elevation: 271 m (889 ft)

Population (2026-01-01)
  - Total: 2,907
  - Density: 71.28/km^{2} (184.6/sq mi)
- Time zone: UTC+1 (CET)
  - Summer (DST): UTC+2 (CEST)
- Postal codes: 470 02, 471 23, 473 01
- Website: www.zakupy.cz

Zákupy (Czech pronunciation: [ˈzaːkupɪ]; German: Reichstadt) is a town in Česká Lípa District in the Liberec Region of the Czech Republic. It has about 2,900 inhabitants. The town is located on the Svitavka River in the Ralsko Uplands.

Zákupy was probably founded in the 13th century. The main landmark of the town is the Zákupy Castle, which is protected as a national cultural monument. The historic town centre with the castle is well preserved and is protected as an urban monument zone.

== Administrative division ==
Zákupy consists of seven municipal parts (in brackets population according to the 2021 census):

- Zákupy (2,167)
- Božíkov (220)
- Brenná (112)
- Kamenice (159)
- Lasvice (81)
- Šidlov (62)
- Veselí (36)

== Etymology ==
The name Zákupy is derived from the Czech word zákup. It was a term for inheritance right arising from purchase.

== Geography ==
Zákupy is located about 7 kilometres (4 mi) east of Česká Lípa and 29 km (18 mi) west of Liberec. It lies in the Ralsko Uplands. The highest point is the hill Kamenický kopec at 436 m (1,430 ft) above sea level. The southern part of the municipal territory extends into the Kokořínsko – Máchův kraj Protected Landscape Area.

The Svitavka River flows through the town. The Ploučnice River flows across the southern part of the territory, but its confluence with the Svitavka is located just outside the territory of Zákupy. There are several small fishponds in the vicinity of the town.

== History ==
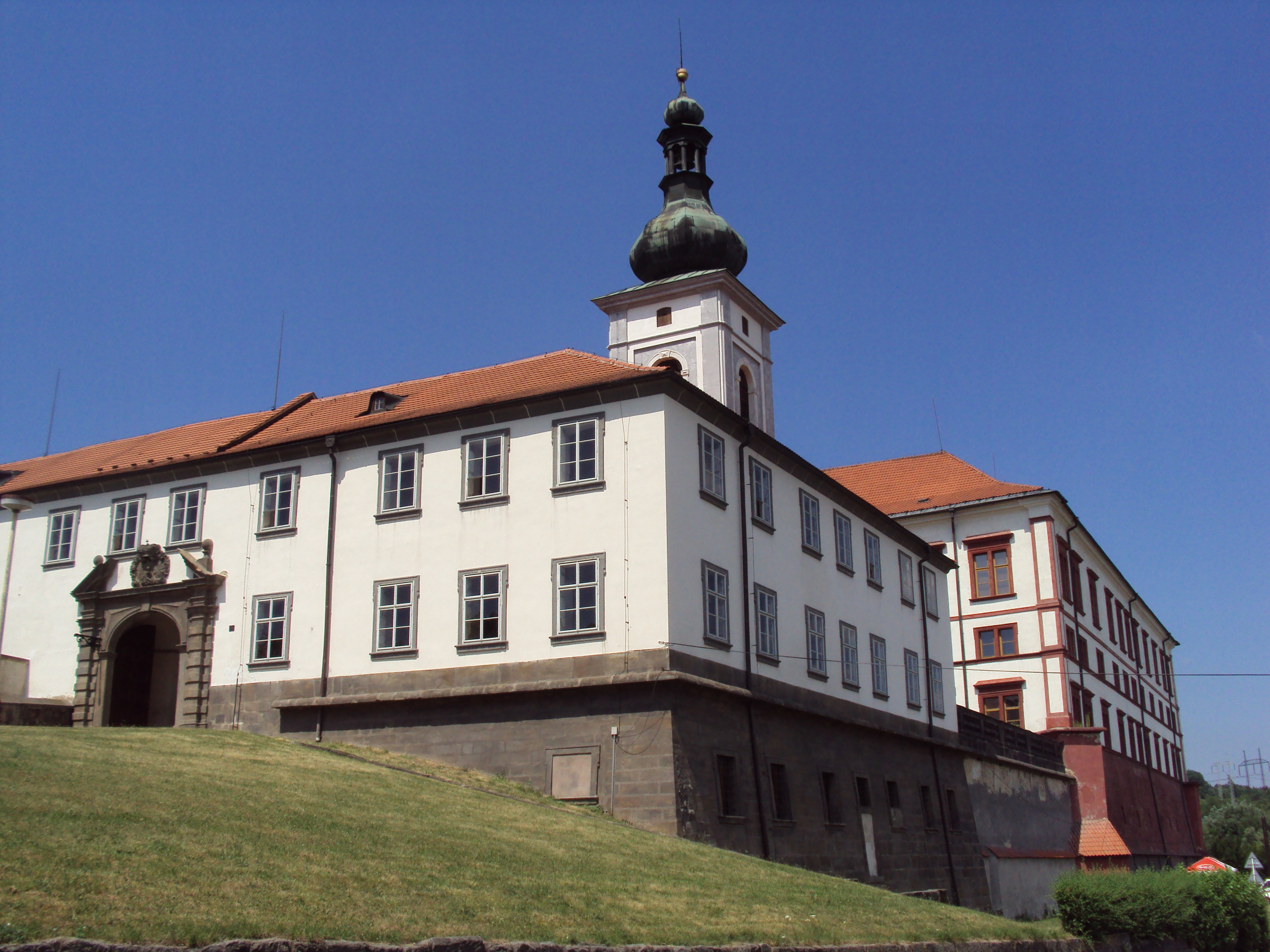
Zákupy Castle

=== 13th–18th centuries ===
Zákupy was probably founded in the 13th century. The first written mention of Zákupy under the name Richinstadt is from 1315, when Fridman of Richinstadt owned the local fortress. Under the fortress were two villages, Czech and German, which shared a church and which soon merged into one settlement. Zákupy was referred to as a market town in 1378.

Zákupy was held by the noble Pancíř of Smojno family, then by the Lords of Wartenberg, who sold Zákupy to the Berka of Dubá family in the 1460s. During their rule, Zákupy prospered and developed, and in 1541, it was promoted to a town. In 1612, the indebted estate was bought by Jan Novohradský of Kolowrat.

During the Thirty Years' War, Zákupy was looted and damaged several times (in 1621, 1634 and 1639) by various armies. The estate was acquired by the Imperial field marshal Julius Henry of Saxe-Lauenburg in 1632. His son Julius Francis founded the Capuchin monastery and had the castle rebuilt. The last heiress, Anna Maria Franziska of Saxe-Lauenburg, died at the castle in 1741. Her daughter Maria Anna was married to Ferdinand Maria Innocenz of Bavaria and hence the possessions went to his family.

=== 19th–20th centuries ===
In 1803, the estate was purchased by the Habsburg archduke Ferdinand III. In 1815, Emperor Francis I of Austria awarded the title of Duke of Reichstadt (German: Herzog von Reichstadt) to his grandson, Napoleon II. Napoleon II died without heirs in 1832, having never visited the town. After his abdication from the throne in 1848, Emperor Ferdinand I of Austria took over the management of the estate. He used the castle as a summer residence and had the interior decorated in the Rococo style.

On 8 July 1876, Russia's Chancellor Alexander Gorchakov and Austria's Emperor Emperor Franz Joseph reached the Reichstadt Agreement on the following Russo-Turkish War and the partition of the Balkans at the castle. Archduke Franz Ferdinand of Austria and Countess Sophie Chotek of Chotkov were married there on 1 July 1900.

The town was part of the Sudetenland, and most of its inhabitants were Sudeten Germans. In October 1938, the region was annexed by Nazi Germany, as a result of the Munich Agreement, and was incorporated into the Reichsgau Sudetenland. After World War II, the German population was expelled.

== Demographics ==
Historical population

Year	Pop.	±%
1869	4,411	—
1880	4,266	−3.3%
1890	3,658	−14.3%
1900	3,534	−3.4%
1910	3,330	−5.8%

Year	Pop.	±%
1921	3,533	+6.1%
1930	3,821	+8.2%
1950	2,437	−36.2%
1961	2,482	+1.8%
1970	2,446	−1.5%

Year	Pop.	±%
1980	2,278	−6.9%
1991	1,987	−12.8%
2001	2,593	+30.5%
2011	2,711	+4.6%
2021	2,837	+4.6%

Source: Censuses

== Transport ==
Zákupy is located on the railway line Liberec–Děčín.

== Sights ==
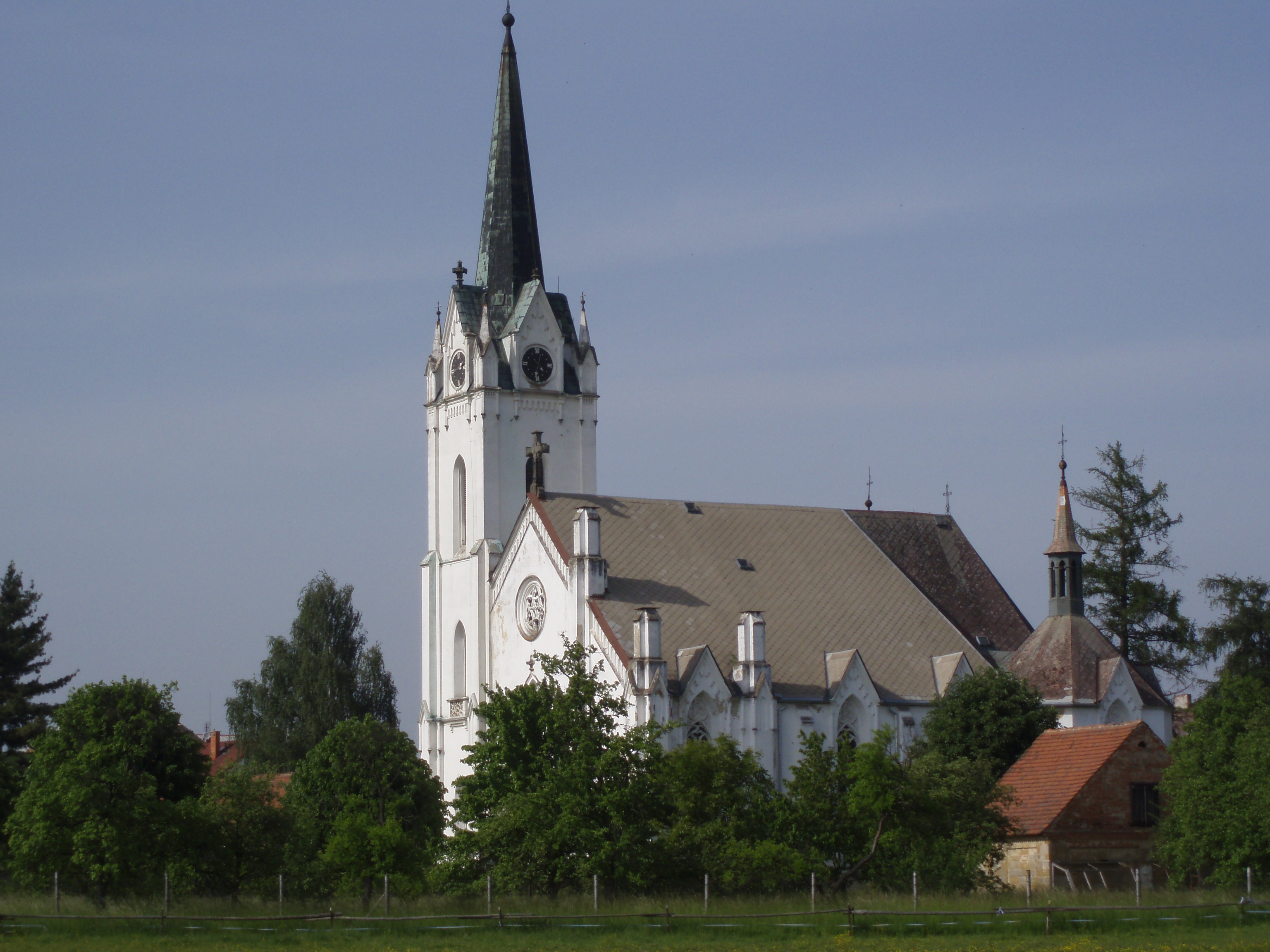
Church of Saints Fabian and Sebastian

Zákupy is known for Zákupy Castle. It was created by the reconstruction of the original fortress, which began in 1541. During the reconstruction after the fire in 1573, a large eastern wing was created, and the castle was gradually expanded into four wings. In the 1680s, the castle was rebuilt in the Baroque style. During World War I, there was a hospital in the castle. After World War I, the castle became state property and since the 1970s, it has been open to the public. The castle includes French garden and English park. Since 2002, it has been protected as a national cultural monument.

The historical core is formed by the square Náměstí Svobody. Among the main landmarks of the square are the pseudo-Gothic town hall from 1867 and a Baroque plague column with the statue of Holy Trinity from 1708.

Other sights include Church of Saints Fabian and Sebastian, former Capuchin monastery with Church of Saint Francis of Assisi, and stone bridges over the Svitavka.

== Notable people ==
- Countess Palatine Maria Anna of Neuburg (1693–1751), noblewoman
- Meda Mládková (1919–2022), art collector
