= Ferdinand Maria Innozenz of Bavaria =

Bavarian prince and Imperial Field marshal (1699-1738)

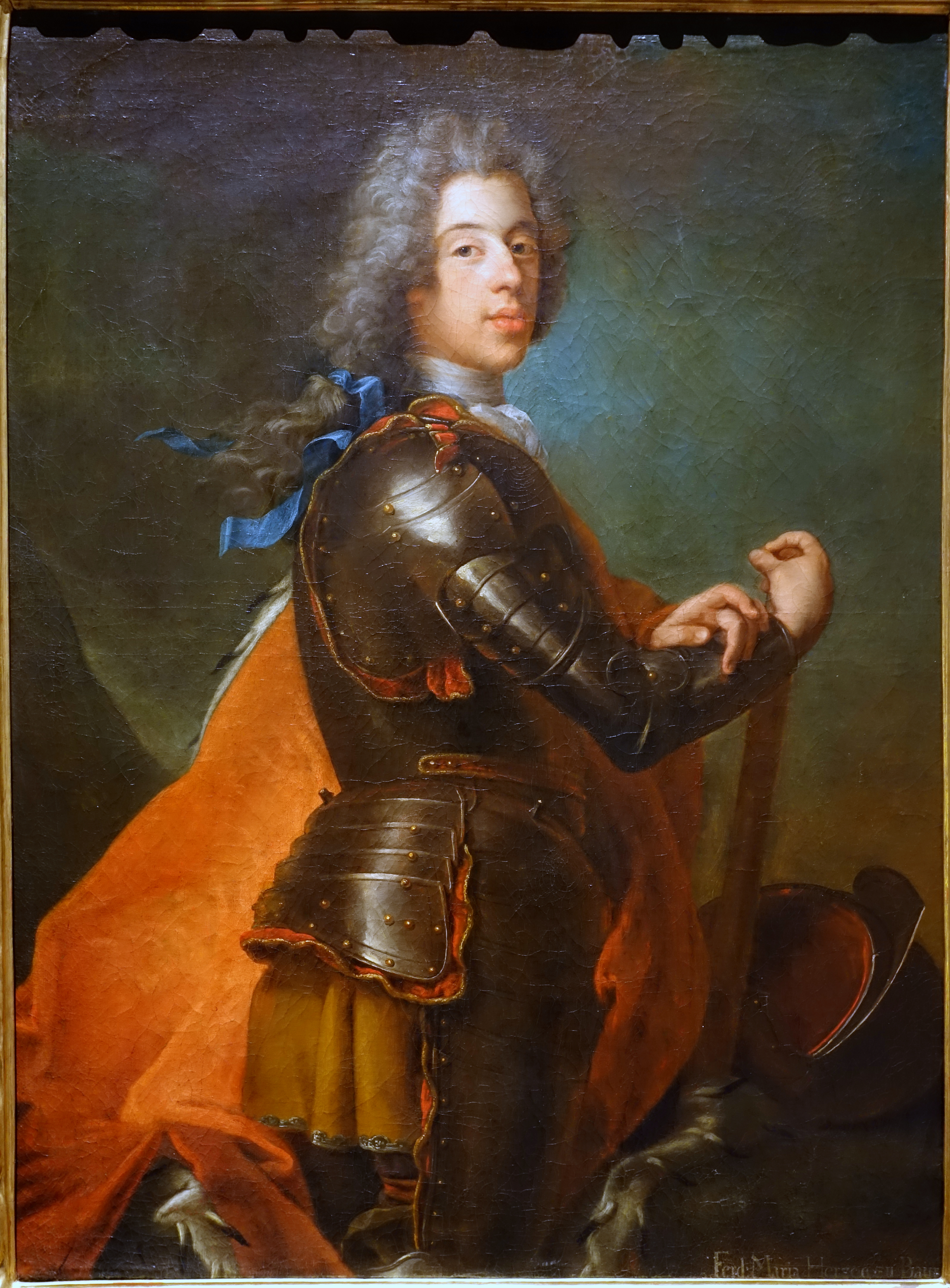
- Portrait by Joseph Vivien, c. 1724
- Born: 5 August 1699; Brussels, Duchy of Brabant, Spanish Netherlands, Holy Roman Empire
- Died: 9 December 1738 (aged 39); Munich, Electorate of Bavaria, Holy Roman Empire
- Burial: Theatine Church, Munich
- Spouse: Countess Palatine Maria Anna of Neuburg (m. 1719)
- Issue Detail: Duke Maximilian Francis Joseph; Clement Francis de Paula; Duchess Therese Emmanuel; Joseph Ferdinand (ill.)
- House: Wittelsbach
- Father: Maximilian II Emanuel, Elector of Bavaria
- Mother: Therese Kunigunde Sobieska

Ferdinand Maria Innocenz Michael Joseph of Bavaria (5 August 1699 in Brussels – 9 December 1738 in Munich) was a Bavarian prince and an Imperial Field marshal.

== Life ==
Ferdinand Maria Innocent was a son of Elector Maximilian II Emanuel of Bavaria (1662-1726) from his marriage to Therese Kunigunde Sobieska (1676-1730), a daughter of King John III Sobieski of Poland.

He served as a general in the imperial army. In 1738, he was promoted to Field marshal and imperial Feldzeugmeister.

He died in 1738 and was buried in the Theatine Church in Munich.

== Marriage and issue ==
Ferdinand Maria Innocent married on 5 February 1719 in Zákupy to Maria Anna Carolina, a daughter of Philip William August, Count Palatine of Neuburg. He had the following children:

- Maximilian Francis Joseph (11 April 1720 – 12 December 1738) died aged 18 unmarried with no issue.
- Clement Francis de Paula (1722–1770)

married in 1742 Countess Palatine Maria Anna of Sulzbach (1722–1790)

- Therese Emmanuel (22 July 1723 – 27 March 1743) died aged 19 unmarried.

Ferdinand also had a son from his extra-marital affaire with Countess Marie Adelaide Fortunata Spaur (1694–1781):

- Joseph Ferdinand (1718–1805), general of the regiment "Count of Salern", married:
  1. in 1753 to Countess Marie Mechthildis of Törring (1734–1764)
  2. in 1766 to Countess Josepha of La Rosee (d. 1772)
