= Pieter van der Werff =

Dutch painter

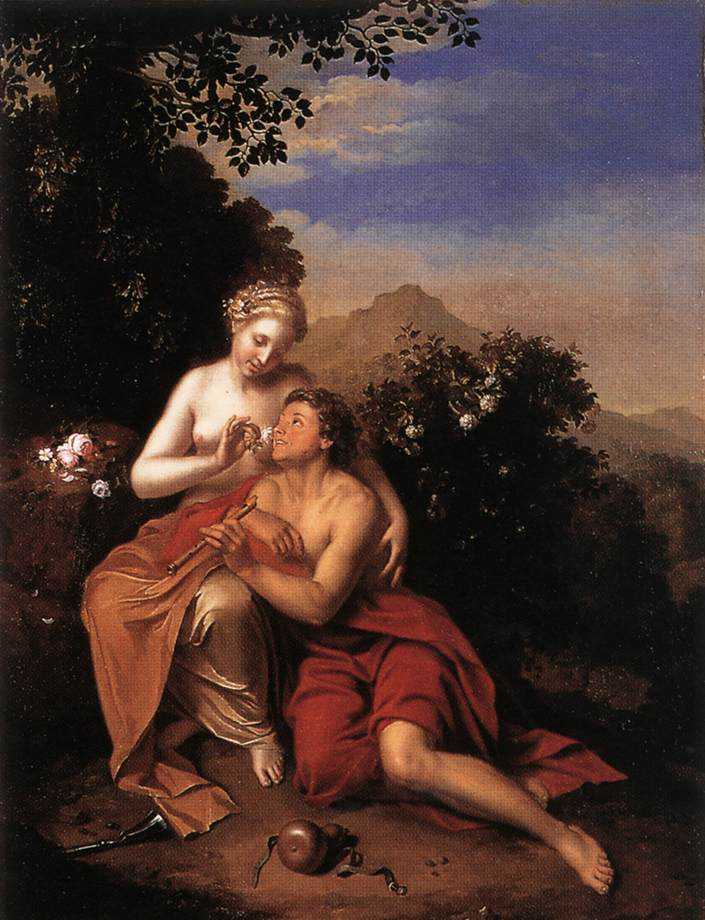
- Granida and Daifilo, 1711
- Born: 1665; Kralingen, Dutch Republic (modern-day Netherlands)
- Died: 26 September 1722 (aged 56–57); Rotterdam, Dutch Republic (modern-day Netherlands)
- Known for: Painting
- Movement: Baroque

Pieter van der Werff (1665 – 26 September 1722) was a Dutch Golden Age painter. He assisted his older brother, Adriaen van der Werff.

== Life ==
He learned to paint from his brother Adriaen and according to the RKD, he spent most of his life working in Rotterdam, where he painted the rich and famous. There is possible evidence he might have travelled to England to seek commissions as two portraits painted c.1709 of an unknown gentleman and unknown woman hang in the Victoria Art Gallery Bath, their alternative titles being John Churchill, First Duke of Marlborough and Sarah, Duchess of Marlborough. Whilst in England he may have had commissions from the Fairfax family – a long established Yorkshire Catholic family who owned extensive land and property in the county.

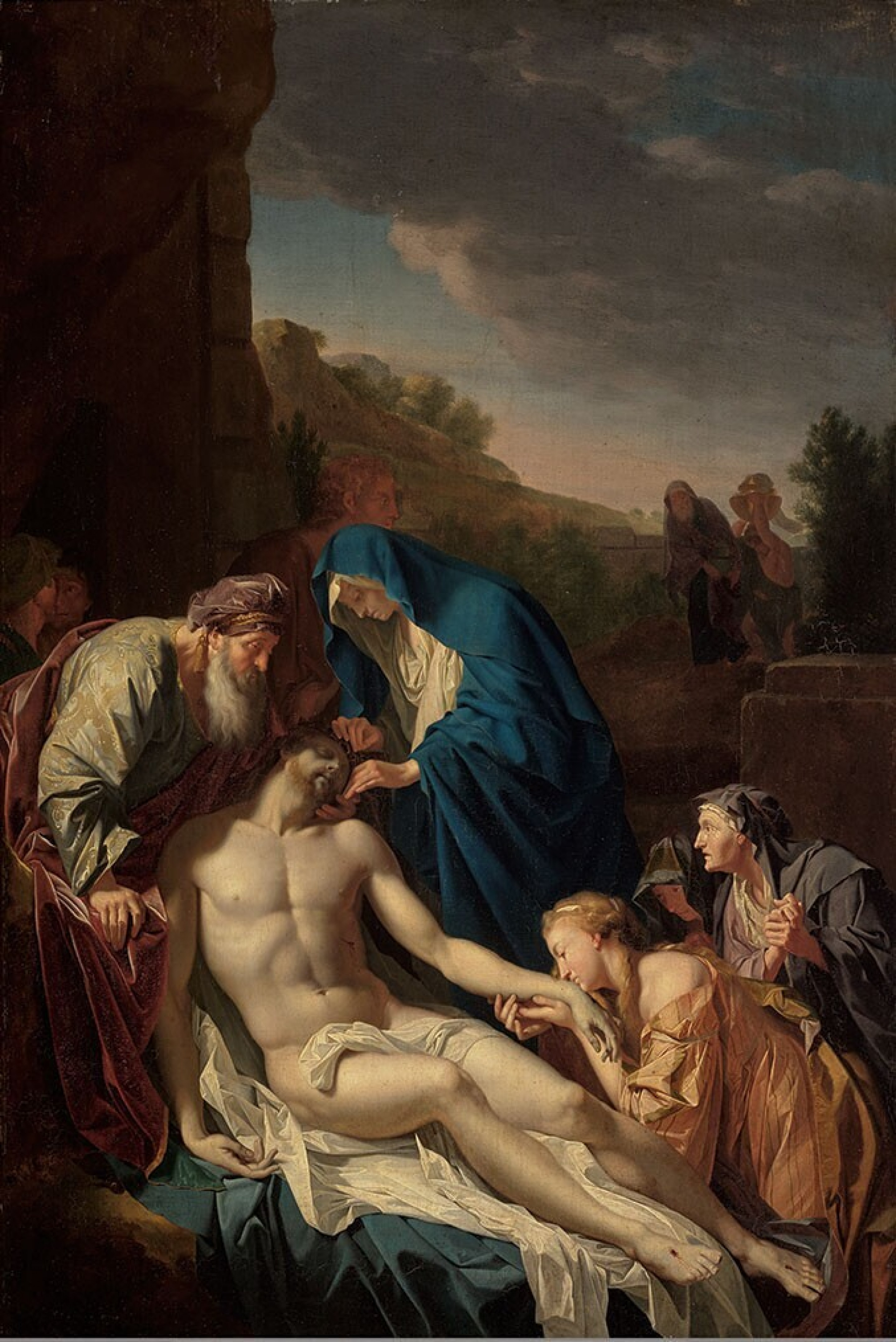
The Entombment of Christ (1709) Initially attributed to his brother Adriaen. This is the earliest known painting to use Prussian blue.

Pieter was also the first recorded painter to use the pigment Prussian blue, with the earliest usage through painting a copy of his brother's painting The Entombment of Christ in 1709, using the pigment.

== Works ==
- Portrait of Adriaen Paets (1690-1720), two portraits
- Portrait of Adriaen Besemer (1690-1722)
- Portrait of Cornelis de Koningh (1690-1722)
- Portrait of Paulus Verschuur (1690-1722)
- Portrait of Gerard van Bergen (1695-1722)
- Portrait of Cornelis van den Bergh (1695-1722)
- Portrait of Johan van der Bergh (1695-1722)
- Portrait of Joost van Coulster (1695-1722)
- Portrait of Cornelis Jansz Hartigsvelt (1695-1722)
- Portrait of Willem Hartigsvelt
- Portrait of Johan Kievelt (1695-1722)
- Portrait of Ewoud Pietersz (1695-1722)
- Portrait of Johan de Reus (1695-1722)
- Portrait of Dominicus Rosmale (1695-1722),
- Portrait of Pieter Sonmans (1695-1722)
- Portrait of Johan van der Veeken (1695-1722)
- Portrait of Johan de Vries (1695-1722)
- Portrait of Philip William August, Count Palatine of Neuburg (1690s)
- Portrait of Jacob Dane (1700)
- Portrait of a Cornelis Matelief de Jonge (1700)
- Granida and Daifilo (1711)
- Portrait of a Woman, presumably Elisabeth Hollaer, wife of Theodorus Rijswijk (1710s)
- Lot and his Daughters
- Portrait of Hendrik Nobel
- Portrait of a Gentleman (1709) (alternative: John Churchill (1650-1722), 1st Duke of Marlborough), Victoria Art Gallery, Bath, England
- Portrait of a Woman (1709) (alternative: Sarah, Duchess of Marlborough) 1709, Victoria Art Gallery, Bath, England
- Portrait of a Gentleman, (c.1700) (alternative: John Dann (1660-1722), partner in Coggs & Dann, London Goldsmith Bankers,
- Portrait of a Lady (1705) possibly Eliza Dann, wife of John Dann, of Coggs & Dann London Goldsmith Bankers,
- Portrait of a Gentleman, (1704), Fairfax house, York England

== Public Art Galleries and Museums ==
Some of the artist's paintings feature amongst the following collections:

USA

- Detroit Institute of Arts, Michigan USA - 'The Repentant Magdalen, 1711'

UK

- Fitzwilliam Museum, University of Cambridge, England - 'Bacchus and Ariadne' 1712
- Victoria Art Gallery, Bath, England -portraits of 'Gentleman and Lady' -alternatives: 'John & Sarah Churchill', Duke & Duchess of Marlborough 1709
- Lamport House, Northamptonshire, England, 'man with cat and birdcage within an arch'
- Nottingham City Museum and Galleries, England, 'Christian de Weerdt'
- Pollok house, Glasgow, Scotland, 'Saint Mary Magdalen' c.1707-1722'
- Erddig Estate, Wrexham, Wales, 'The Expulsion of Adam and Eve' (attributed), National Trust
- Wellcome Collection, London, England, 'Portrait of a Man' (attributed)

RUSSIA

- Hermitage Museum, Saint Petersburg, Russia - 'Peter the Great'

FRANCE

- Louvre Paris, - 'Adam and Eve'

NETHERLANDS

- Rijksmuseum, Amsterdam - 'A Girl Drawing and a Boy near a Statue of Venus'
- Museum Boijmans Van Beuningen, Rotterdam - 'self portrait', 'The Penitent Magdalen'

DENMARK

- Statens Museum for Kunst (National Gallery of Denmark), Copenhagen
