= Julius Francis, Duke of Saxe-Lauenburg =

Julius Francis
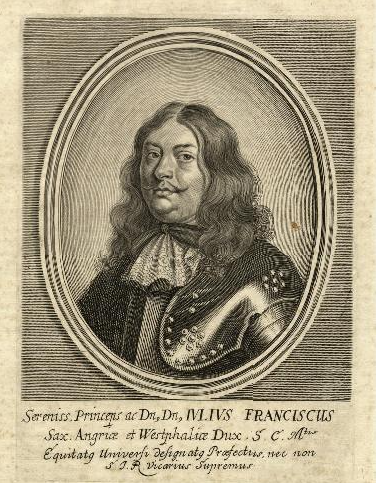

Duke of Saxe-Lauenburg
- Reign: 1666 – 1689
- Predecessor: Francis Erdmann
- Successor: George William
- Born: 16 September 1641; Prague, Kingdom of Bohemia
- Died: 30 September 1689 (aged 48); Reichstadt, Kingdom of Bohemia
- Consort: Hedwig of the Palatinate-Sulzbach
- Issue more...: Anna Maria Franziska, Grand Duchess of Tuscany; Sibylle, Margravine of Baden-Baden
- House: House of Ascania
- Father: Julius Henry, Duke of Saxe-Lauenburg
- Mother: Anna Magdalena of Lobkowicz
- Religion: Roman Catholic

Julius Francis (16 September 1641 – 30 September 1689) was duke of Saxe-Lauenburg between 1666 and 1689. He was officially known as Julius Franz von Sachsen, Engern und Westfalen.

== Life ==
He was a son of Duke Julius Henry and his third wife Anna Magdalena of Lobkowicz, daughter of Baron William the Younger Popel of Lobkowicz. His father Julius Henry had acquired sprawling estates around and a castle in Ploschkowitz (Ploskovice) and Schlackenwerth (Ostrov), Kingdom of Bohemia. Julius Francis had inherited more estates from his Bohemian mother, which is why the dukes of Saxe-Lauenburg had been adopted into the Bohemian nobility, however, not as imperially immediate aristocrats, as in their homeland. Having no sons Julius Francis provided for the legal grounds of female succession in Saxe-Lauenburg. With his death, the Lauenburg line of the House of Ascania was extinct in the male line. So Julius Francis' two daughters Anna Maria Franziska and Sibylle fought for the succession of the former, the elder sister. Also, Julius Francis' cousin, Eleonore Charlotte of Saxe-Lauenburg-Franzhagen, claimed the succession. Their weakness was abused by George William, Duke of Brunswick-Lüneburg, who invaded Saxe-Lauenburg with his troops, thus inhibiting the ascension of the legal heiress.

Also other monarchies claimed the succession, resulting in a conflict involving further the neighboring duchies of Mecklenburg-Schwerin and of Danish Holstein, as well as the five Ascanian-ruled Principalities of Anhalt, the Electorate of Saxony, which had succeeded the Dukes of Saxe-Wittenberg in 1422, Sweden and Brandenburg.

Militarily engaged were Celle and Danish Holstein, which agreed on 9 October 1693 (Hamburger Vergleich), that Celle – de facto holding most of Saxe-Lauenburg – would retain the duchy in personal union. In 1728 Charles VI finally legitimized the de facto takeover. Anna Maria Franziska and Sibylle, never waiving their claim, were dispossessed in Saxe-Lauenburg and the former exiled in Ploschkowitz.

== Marriage and issue ==
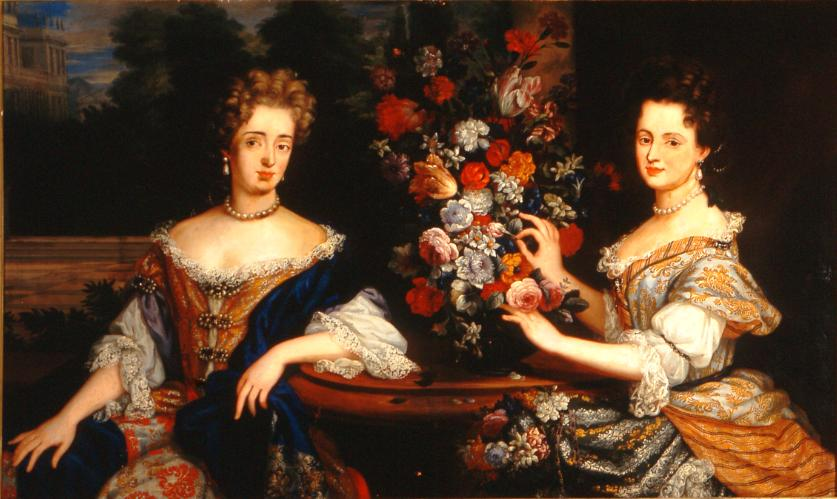
His two surviving daughters Sibylle (left) and Anna Maria Franziska (right), anonymous, c. 1690

On 9 April 1668 Julius Francis married in Sulzbach Hedwig of the Palatinate (1650 – 1681), daughter of Christian Augustus, Count Palatine of Sulzbach. They had three daughters:

- Maria Anna Theresia (1670–1671)
- Anna Maria Franziska (Neuhaus upon Elbe, 13 June 1672 – 15 October 1741, Reichstadt);

married firstly on 29 October 1690 in Raudnitz upon Elbe to Philip William August, Count Palatine of Neuburg (1668–1693), son of Philip William, Elector Palatine;
married secondly on 2 July 1697 in Düsseldorf to Gian Gastone de' Medici, Grand Duke of Tuscany (1671–1737)

- Franziska Sibylle Augusta (Ratzeburg, 21 January 1675 – 10 July 1733, Ettlingen), married 27 March 1690 in Raudnitz Louis William, Margrave of Baden-Baden.

Julius Francis, Duke of Saxe-Lauenburg House of Ascania Born: 16 September 1641 in Prague Died: 30 September 1689 in Reichstadt
Regnal titles
Preceded by Francis Erdmann	Duke of Saxe-Lauenburg; 1666 – 1689	Succeeded by George William
