= Cvikov =

- Town
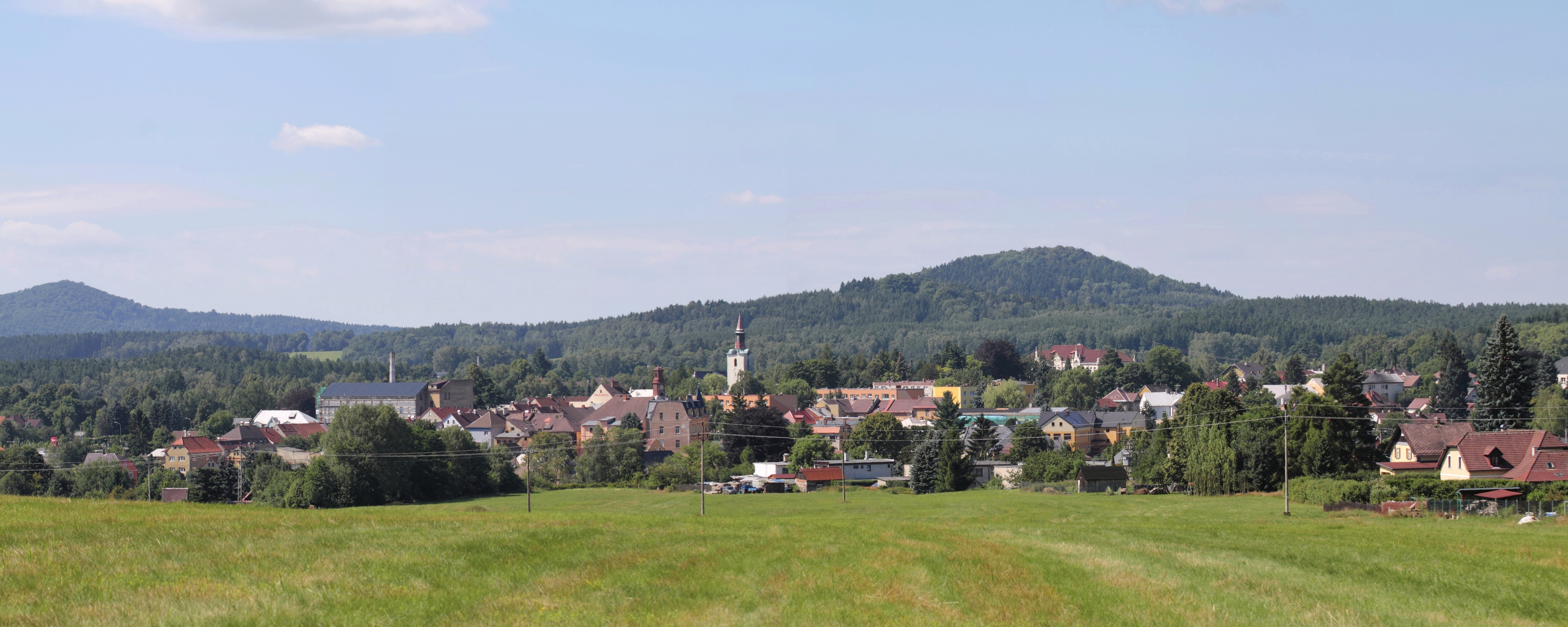
- View from the southeast

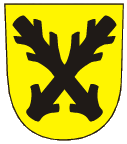
- Flag Coat of arms

- Location in the Czech Republic
- Coordinates: 50°46′33″N 14°38′0″E
- Country: Czech Republic
- Region: Liberec
- District: Česká Lípa
- First mentioned: 1352

Government
  - Mayor: Petr Vrabec

Area
  - Total: 45.09 km^{2} (17.41 sq mi)
- Elevation: 357 m (1,171 ft)

Population (2026-01-01)
  - Total: 4,520
  - Density: 100/km^{2} (260/sq mi)
- Time zone: UTC+1 (CET)
  - Summer (DST): UTC+2 (CEST)
- Postal code: 471 54
- Website: www.cvikov.cz

Cvikov (Czech pronunciation: [ˈtsvɪkof]; German: Zwickau in Böhmen) is a town in Česká Lípa District in the Liberec Region of the Czech Republic. It has about 4,500 inhabitants.

== Administrative division ==
Cvikov consists of eight municipal parts (in brackets population according to the 2021 census):

- Cvikov I (992)
- Cvikov II (2,676)
- Drnovec (185)
- Lindava (386)
- Naděje (37)
- Svitava (21)
- Trávník (37)
- Záhořín (0)

== Etymology ==
The origin of the name is unclear. According to one theory, the name was derived from the personal name Cvik, meanings "Cvik's (court)". This is also evidenced by the oldest preserved documents, where the name of the settlement is written with Cv- at the beginning. According to the second theory, the town was founded by German colonists and the name was transferred to it from the Saxon city of Zwickau. This is evidenced by the time the settlement was founded. Some documents suggest that these theories may not be correct and Cvikov was originally named Zvíkov, which is the name of several other settlements in the country.

== Geography ==
Cvikov is located about 12 kilometres (7 mi) northeast of Česká Lípa and 29 km (18 mi) west of Liberec. It lies mostly in the Ralsko Uplands. The northern part of the municipal territory extends into the Lusatian Mountains and includes the highest point of Cvikov, the mountain Suchý vrch at 641 m (2,103 ft) above sea level. The stream Boberský potok flows through the town proper. The Svitavka River flows through the villages of Lindava and Svitava.

== History ==
The first written mention of Cvikov is from 1352. The settlement was founded in the 13th century. In 1391, it was promoted to a town. In 1634, during the Thirty Years' War, the town was destroyed by fire, then it suffered during the War of the Bavarian Succession (1778). The greatest development of Cvikov occurred in the 19th century, when the town was industrialised.

== Demographics ==
Historical population

Year	Pop.	±%
1869	8,271	—
1880	8,500	+2.8%
1890	8,788	+3.4%
1900	9,067	+3.2%
1910	8,530	−5.9%

Year	Pop.	±%
1921	7,365	−13.7%
1930	7,477	+1.5%
1950	4,512	−39.7%
1961	4,177	−7.4%
1970	4,224	+1.1%

Year	Pop.	±%
1980	4,518	+7.0%
1991	4,327	−4.2%
2001	4,449	+2.8%
2011	4,311	−3.1%
2021	4,334	+0.5%

Source: Censuses

== Transport ==
The I/13 road, which connects Liberec with Ústí nad Labem, runs through the town.

== Sights ==
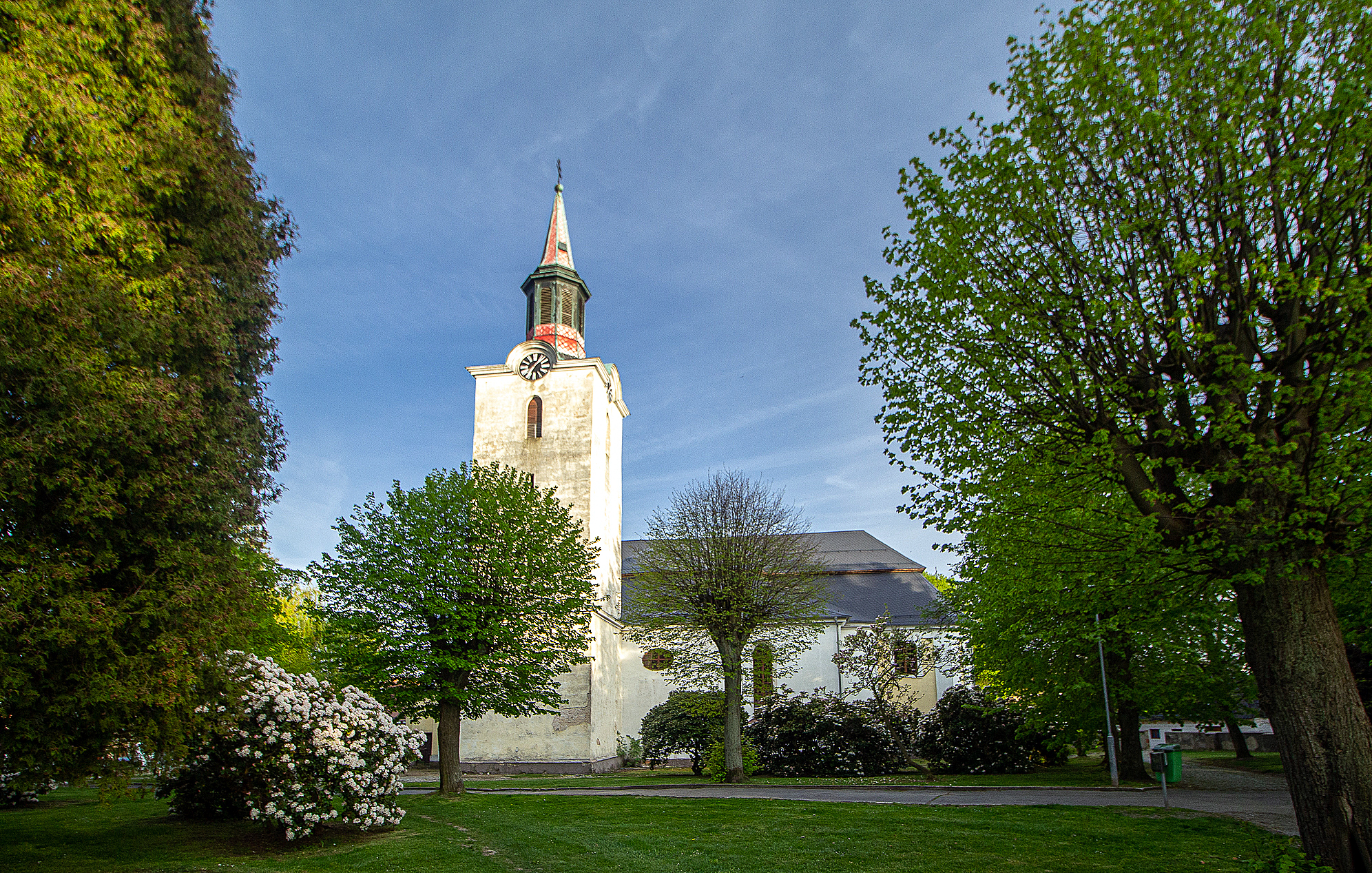
Church of Saint Elizabeth of Hungary

The main landmark of the town is the Church of Saint Elizabeth of Hungary. The original Gothic church was completely rebuilt in 1553–1558, then it was rebuilt into is current Baroque form in 1726–1728.

== Notable people ==
- Anton Günther (1783–1863), Austrian philosopher
- Karl Kreibich (1883–1966), German Bohemian politician
- Josef Friedrich (1893–?), flying ace
