= Agatha van der Mijn =

Dutch artist (1700–1776/1796)

- Born: 13 May 1700; Amsterdam
- Died: 1776/1796; London

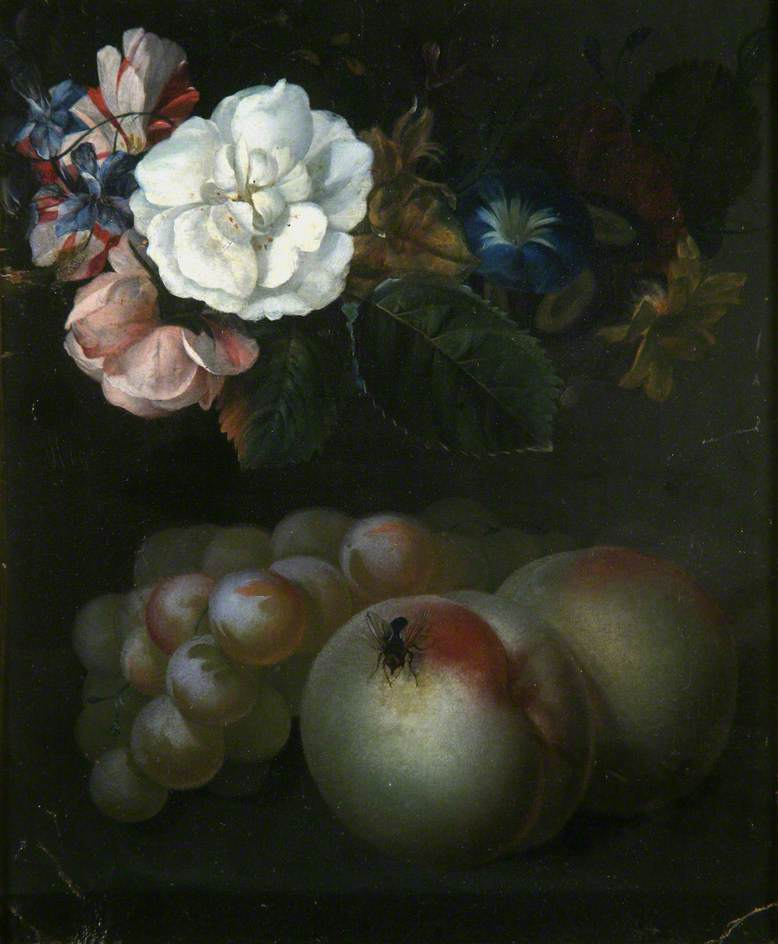
Fruit and flower still life

Agatha van der Mijn (13 May 1700 – 1776/1796) was an 18th-century flower painter from the Dutch Republic active in London.

== Biography ==
She was the younger sister of the painter Herman van der Mijn, and like her niece Cornelia learned to paint flowers from him. The poet Willem van Swaanenburg (1678 - 1728) published a book of poems "Parnas" in 1724 that included a poem in honor of her 18th birthday professing his undying love for her and mentioning her as "a magical goddess of painter flowers". Since this poem shows that she was already active as a flower artist before 1718, it is possible that she accompanied her brother when he took his family and the family of his pupil Jacoba Maria van Nickelen to Dusseldorp in 1712–1713 to work for Johann Wilhelm, Elector Palatine. The flower painter Rachel Ruysch was also active in Dusseldorp in the years 1712-1716 and Agatha's work, along with that of Nickelen and her niece Cornelia van der Mijn all show a similar style. In 1722 Herman van der Mijn moved to London with his family and she accompanied him. Herman died a year after his son Robert sank through the ice at Marylebone in 1740 while ice-skating.

In 1808 Edward Edwards wrote the following in a piece about her nephew, Herman's son Frank: "Beside Frank, there were two other artists of the same name, R. and A. Vandermine, both of whom were related to the former. One of them painted for the shops, and there are many slight pictures of an Old Man, in a loose coat and hair cap, hugging a bag of money, which were painted, by one of these artists. The wife of one of them was also of the profession : She painted fruit and flowers, and they were all exhibitors at the Society's Rooms in the Strand, in the years 1761 and 1762.".
