= Frans van der Mijn =

Dutch painter

Frans Mijn
- Born: 1719; Düsseldorf, Dutch Republic
- Died: 1783 (aged 63–64); London, England, Great Britain
- Parent: Herman Mijn

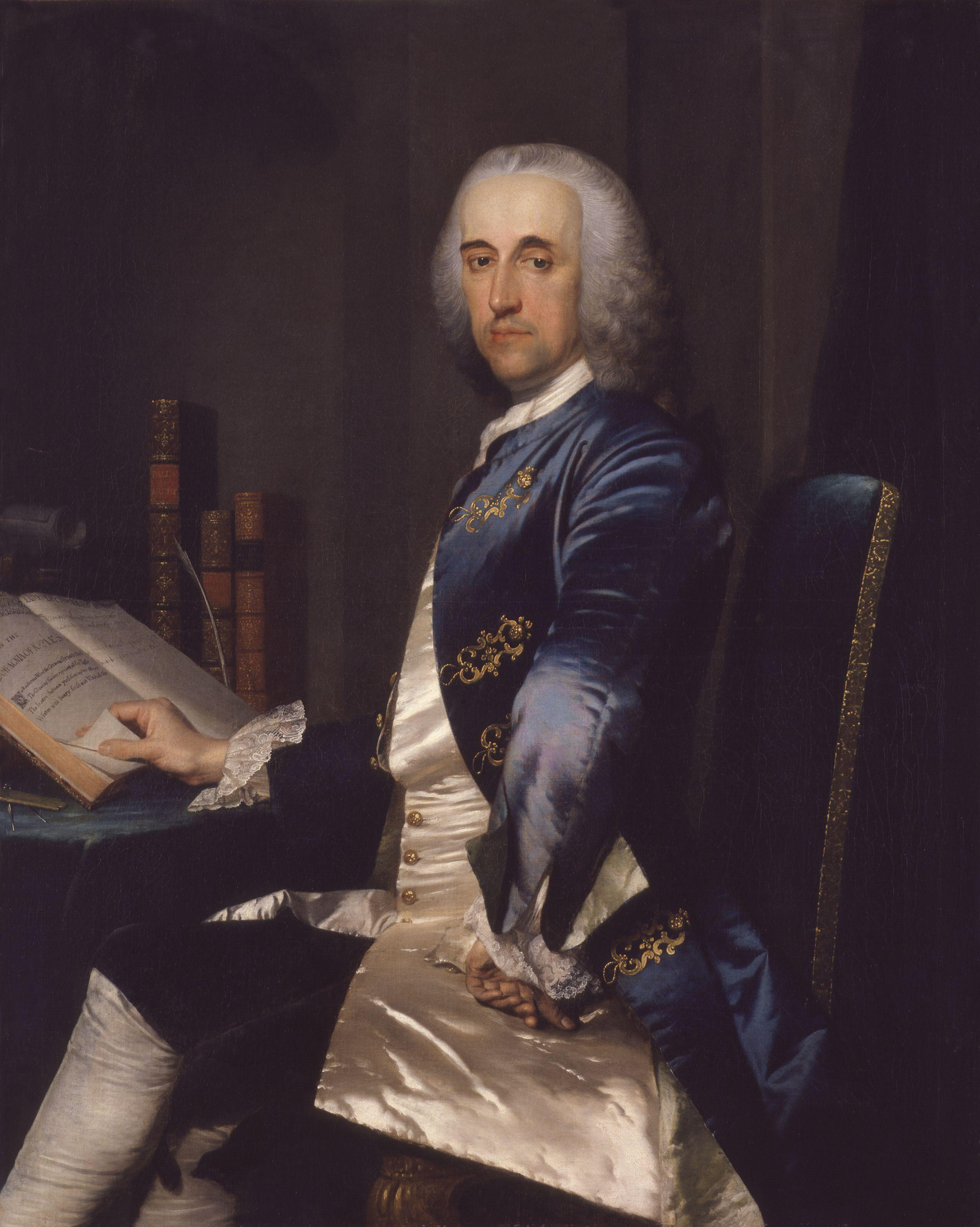
Portrait of Sir Thomas Robinson, 1st Baronet

Frans van der Mijn (1719 – 1783) was a Dutch painter who specialised in portrait painting.

== Biography ==
According to the Netherlands Institute for Art History (RKD), he was the son of Herman van der Mijn and was born when his father moved to Düsseldorf to work for Johann Wilhelm, Elector Palatine. He influenced the painter James Latham. He worked in Amsterdam from 1742 until 1748 and worked in The Hague before returning to England where he worked on portraits and sent a painting in to the London Society of Artists each year during 1761–1772.

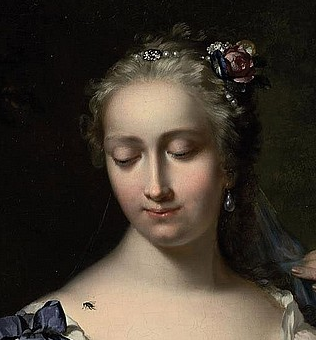
Detail of a 1742 painting by van der Mijn that uses a fly in a Renaissance Allegory of Touch theme

In 1750, Johan van Gool wrote about him, his father, his brothers Robert, George, Andreas and Gerard, and his sister Cornelia who were all good painters. In 1808, Edward Edwards wrote the following about him: "Frank Vandermine, or Vander Mijne: A native of Holland, who lived many years in England, and practised as a portrait painter, both in London and the country. He was some time at Norwich, where he painted several heads. He had considerable merit as an artist, but was of mean address and vulgar manners: He loved smoking and drinking, nor would forego his pipe, though it was offensive to his employers, so that he never acquired the practice which he might otherwise have obtained. He boasted, that after he had painted a portrait, the likeness remained so strong upon his memory, that if the picture were immediately obliterated, he could repaint the resemblance without the assistance of the sitter. He died in indigent circumstances, at his apartments in Moorfields, some time in 1783.

== Other painters ==
Beside Frank, there were two other artists of the same name, R. and A. Vandermine, both of whom were related to the former. One of them painted for the shops, and there are many slight pictures of an Old Man, in a loose coat and hair cap, hugging a bag of money, which were painted, by one of these artists. The wife of one of them was also of the profession: She painted fruit and flowers, and they were all exhibitors at the Society's Rooms in the Strand, in the years 1761 and 1762. There is a mezzotinto portrait of Frank, from a picture of his own painting, inscribed, The Smoker. It represents himself in profile, with a pipe in his mouth."
