= Johannes Spilberg =

Dutch painter

Johannes Spilberg (30 April 1619 – 10 August 1690) was a German Baroque painter, active in Amsterdam during the period known as the Dutch Golden Age.

== Life ==
Spilberg was born and died in Düsseldorf. He learned to paint from his father, who painted in oils and on glass, who then sent him to Antwerp, to learn under Rubens. While underway, he heard that Rubens had died, so he settled in Amsterdam and became apprentice to Govert Flink, a student of Rembrandt, for seven years. He won a commission for a schutterstuk from the Burgomasters of Amsterdam that still hangs in Amsterdam. In Amsterdam he married Marrite Gerrits in 1649.

He worked for years as family portrait painter for Johann Wilhelm, Elector Palatine. His uncle Gabriel was court painter for Charles II of Spain.

Though he worked in Düsseldorf, he kept his family in Amsterdam, since he was traveling with his patron most of the time anyway. He taught his daughter Adriana to paint, and her talents became so well known, that she was offered a position in Düsseldorf as well. Her father wanted her to marry a painter, however, and felt her chances were higher of finding a good one in Amsterdam. Eventually, she did marry the painter Willem Breekveld in 1684, but he died in 1687. After Spilberg's death, she married his successor in Düsseldorf, Eglon van der Neer in December 1697.

He is known for portraits, landscapes, and historical allegories in the Rembrandt school.

== Gallery ==
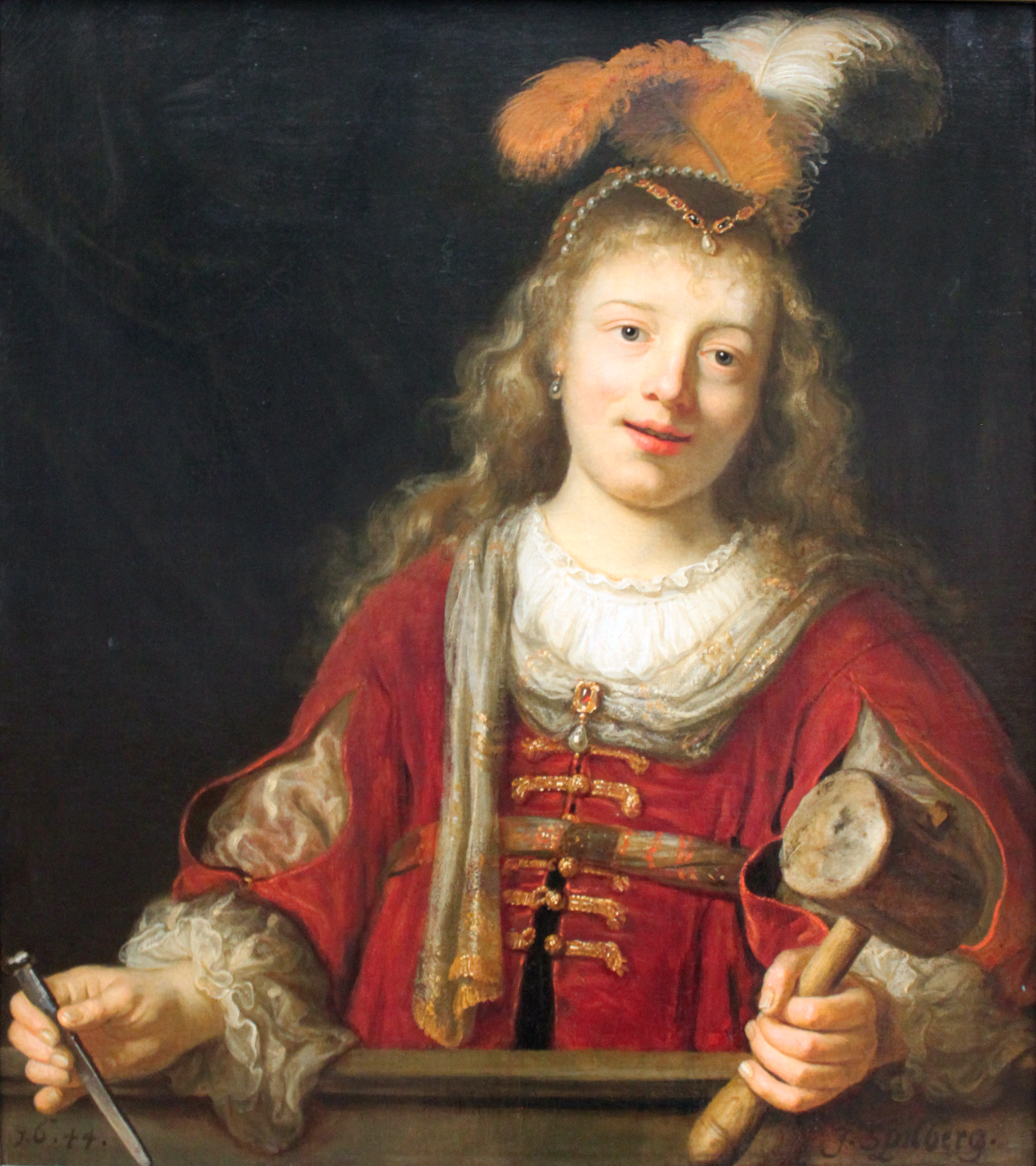
1644 religious painting of Jael with her hammer and nail, style of Flinck, collection Gemäldegalerie Berlin

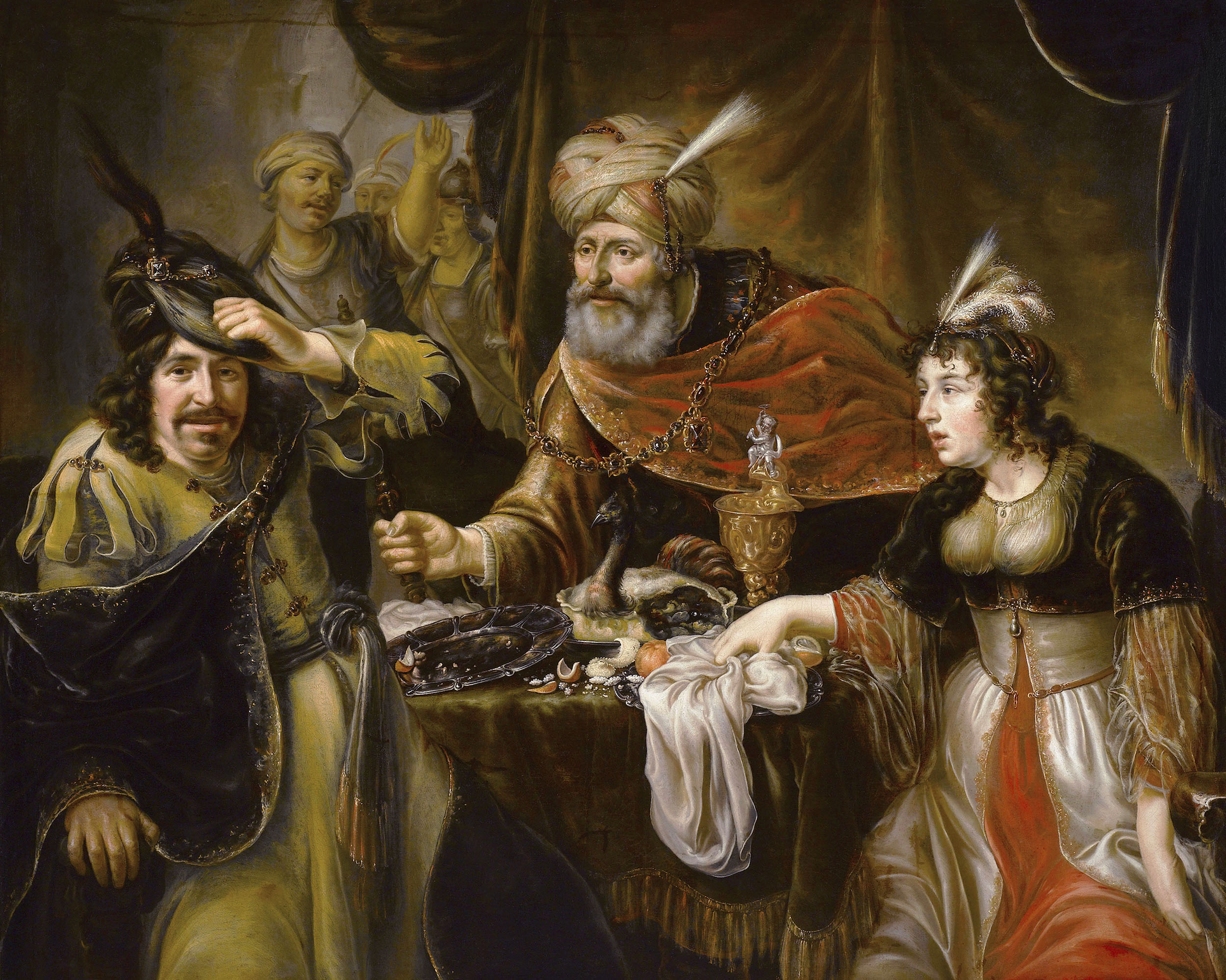
The Feast of Esther by Johannes Spilberg the Younger

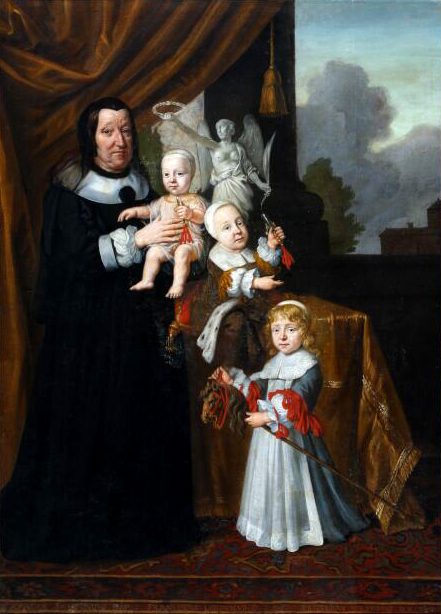
Family of Sophia Eleonore of Saxony, 1667.
