= Herman van der Mijn =

Dutch painter

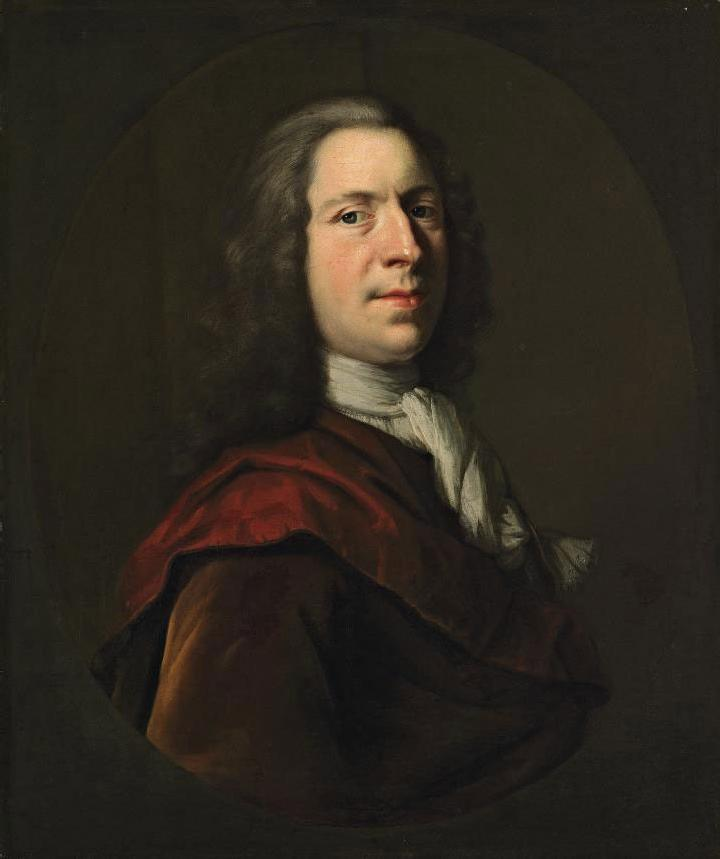
Portrait of Herman van der Mijn by Anna van Hannover

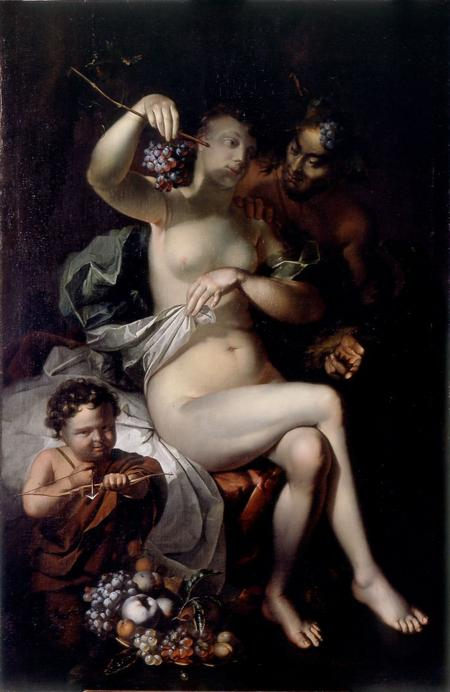
Venus, Jupiter, and Amor, 1712

Herman van der Mijn, or Heroman van der Myn (1684 – 1741), was an 18th-century painter from the Dutch Republic.

He was born in Amsterdam. According to the RKD he learned to paint flowers from Ernst Stuven, and became a master of the Antwerp Guild of St. Luke in 1712, and the following year court painter to Johann Wilhelm, Elector Palatine. According to Houbraken he introduced Jan van Nickelen to Jan Frans van Douven. He took the family of Jan van Nickelen in tow to Dusseldorp, where they painted at court, and Van der Mijn taught Van Nickelen's daughter Jacoba Maria van Nickelen to paint flowers. She met the painters Rachel Ruysch and Willem Troost (whom Jacoba married) there.

Van der Mijn returned to the Netherlands in 1717, but left on a trip via Brussels and Paris to London, where he stayed except in 1737, when he took a trip to Leeuwarden. His sister Agatha was also a flower painter who accompanied him to England, and his children all became painters: George, Robert, Cornelia, Frans, Gerard and Andreas van der Mijn. Other pupils (besides Jacoba Maria) were James Latham and Herman Frederik van Hengel.

He also taught Anne, Princess Royal and Princess of Orange, daughter of George II of Great Britain and Caroline of Ansbach, drawing and painting. She made a portrait of van der Mijn himself while he was at work making portraits of other family members.

He died in London in 1741.
