= Georg Andreas Kraft =

German Baroque composer and musician

- Born: c. 1660; Nuremberg
- Died: 1 December 1726 (aged 65–66); Bedburg
- Other names: Giorgio Krafft, Crafft
- Era: Baroque

Georg Andreas Kraft (c. 1660 – 1 December 1726) was a German Baroque composer and musician. His surname is sometimes given as Krafft or Crafft, and his first name sometimes appears in its Italianized form Giorgio.

Kraft was born in Nuremberg, and with the encouragement of the Elector Palatine, Johann Wilhelm, trained in Italy under the composer and violinist Arcangelo Corelli. On his return, he served as the concert master of the court orchestra in Düsseldorf and composed the ballet music for several operas by his friend Johann Hugo von Wilderer, another composer at Johann Wilhelm's court. He also performed at the coronation of emperor Charles VI at Frankfurt am Main in 1711.

When Charles Philip became Elector Palatine on the death of his brother Johann Wilhelm, he moved his court to Heidelberg. Kraft retired as a court musician in 1716 rather than move to Heidelberg. On his retirement, his son, Sebastian Johannes, took over his musical position. Kraft died in Kaster, a district in the city of Bedburg on 1 December 1726.
