= Jacoba Maria van Nickelen =

Dutch artist (1690–1749)

- Born: 1680; Haarlem, Netherlands
- Died: September 20, 1749 (aged 68–69); Amsterdam, Dutch Republic
- Known for: Painting
- Spouse: Willem Troost

Jacoba Maria van Nickelen (1690–1749) was an 18th-century flower painter from the Dutch Republic.

== Biography ==
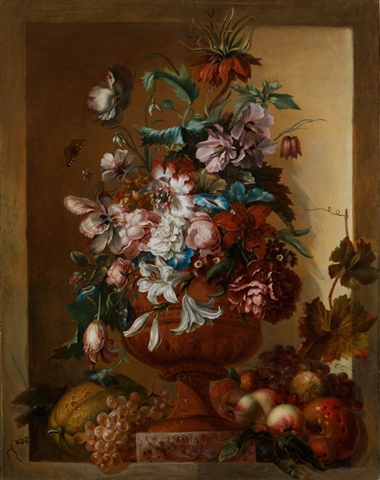
Flowers in a vase set in a stone niche

van Nicklen was born into an old painting family of Haarlem; her grandfather Isaak van Nickelen painted church interiors, and her father Jan van Nickelen was a landscape painter. According to the RKD she was a fruit and flower still life painter, whose work shows the same elements as the work of Cornelia van der Mijn, the daughter of her teacher Herman van der Mijn. She was active at the court of Johann Wilhelm, Elector Palatine, where besides Cornelia, the women painters Adriana Spilberg and Rachel Ruysch also painted. She married the painter Willem Troost and had eight children, though only two survived infancy. van Nickelen died in Amsterdam in 1749.
