= Johann Hugo von Wilderer =

Johann Hugo von Wilderer (1670 or 1671 – buried 7 June 1724) was a German Baroque composer. He was born in Bavaria and died in Mannheim, where in his later years he served as the Kapellmeister of the court orchestra. His compositions include eleven operas, two oratorios, cantatas, and sacred works.

== Life and work ==
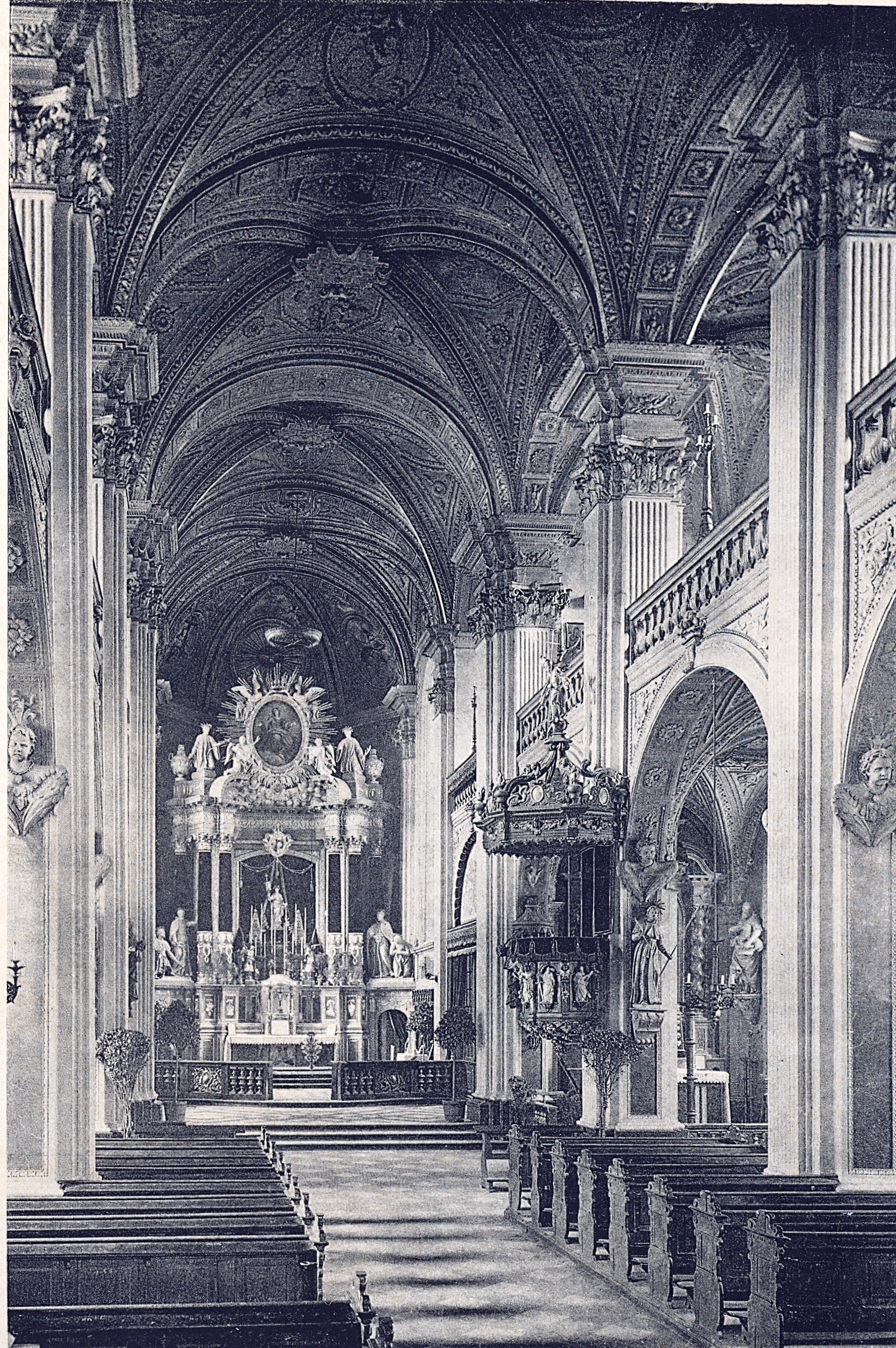
St. Andreas, Düsseldorf, interior, 19th century

Wilderer was born in Bavaria. He studied with Giovanni Legrenzi in Venice. Probably in 1687 he was employed at the Palatine court in Düsseldorf as an organist. A document dated 1 October 1692 indicates that he was organist at the church St. Andreas, the court church at the time. He held the office until 1697. On the occasion of his first opera Giocasta, first performed for the opening of the opera house at the Mühlenstraße in 1696, he was appointed Vice-Kapellmeister (vice musical director). In 1703 he received the title Hofkapellmeister (court musical director). In 1699 he had also received the appointment of Hofkammerrat (treasury official). He was knighted by Elector Johann Wilhelm in 1704 or 1705.

Wilderer probably met George Frideric Handel when Handel visited the court in Düsseldorf in 1710 and 1711. Agostino Steffani was also resident at the court during Wilderer's tenure as Kapellmeister. Georg Andreas Kraft (1660-1726), a friend of Wilderer, wrote the ballet music for several of his operas, including his 1696 Giocasta. A high point in Wilderer's career was the coronation of emperor Charles VI at Frankfurt am Main in 1711, where he conducted the entire orchestra of 53 members.

When the elector died on 8 June 1716, his brother and successor Charles Philip combined the courts in Düsseldorf and Innsbruck, with the new court moved at first to Neuburg, then to Heidelberg, and finally to Mannheim. The Düsseldorf court orchestra was dissolved, but in 1718, many of its musicians were reinstated in the Innsbruck court orchestra headed by Jakob Greber. When Charles Philip moved the court to Mannheim in 1720 Wilderer and Greber served jointly as Kapellmeister of the orchestra, which later became famous as the orchestra of the Mannheim school. Wilderer died in Mannheim and was buried there on 7 June 1724. He was married to Maria Dahmen. The couple had nine children.

At a time when European music was dominated by French and Italian artists, Wilderer gained a reputation as a German musician. His works include eleven operas (most of which were premiered in Düsseldorf), two oratorios, cantatas, motets, and other sacred works. His first opera Giocasta, was revived in Düsseldorf in 2008. His sacred drama Esther, originally performed as an oratorio in Heidelberg in 1723, was performed in Mannheim as an opera on 17 March 1724, three months before his death.

Johann Sebastian Bach copied and performed Wilder's Missa brevis in G minor in around 1730, and for a while the work was believed to have been composed by Bach himself. Christoph Wolff noted similarities between a theme from Wilderer's Missa and the theme of the Kyrie I from Bach's Mass in B minor as well as some similarities in the structure of both works.

== Selected works ==
- Giocasta (dramma per musica), premiered Düsseldorf 1696, libretto by Stefano Benedetto Pallavicino
- Il giorno di salute (dramma per musica), premiered Düsseldorf 1697, libretto probably by Demanstein, the first opera to use a viola d'amore in the orchestra
- Faustolo (favola pastorale per musica), premiered Düsseldorf 1706, libretto by Stefano Benedetto Pallavicino
- Te Deum for choir, trumpets, timpani, strings and basso continuo, recorded 1980 with the Norddeutscher Figuralchor and the Neue Düsseldorfer Hofmusik, conducted by Jörg Straube
