= Cornelia van der Mijn =

Dutch artist (1709–1782)

Cornelia Mijn
- Born: 1709; Amsterdam, The Netherlands
- Died: 1782 (aged 72–73); London, England, Great Britain
- Parent: Herman Mijn

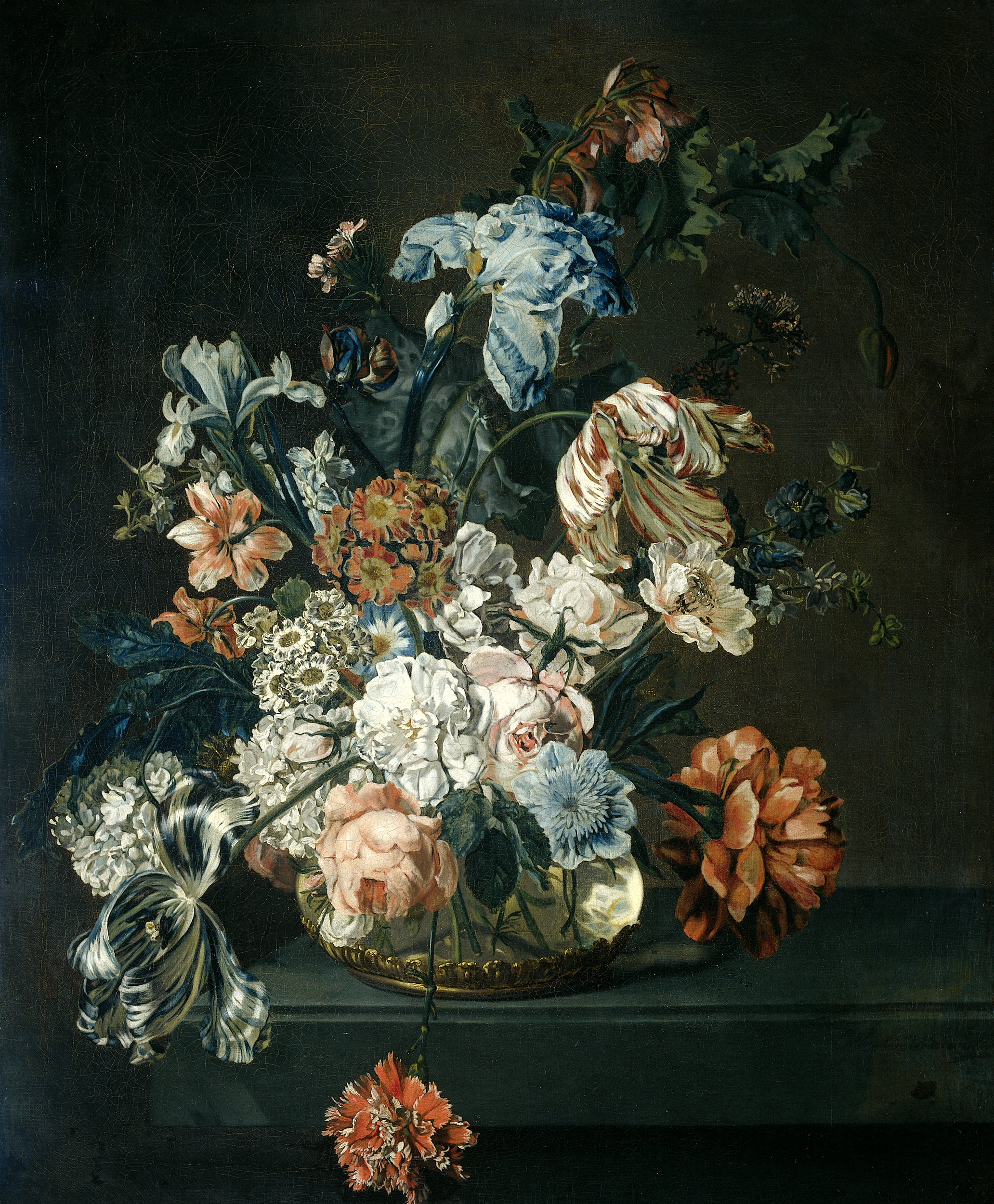
Flower still life, 1762

Cornelia van der Mijn (1709–1782) was an 18th-century flower painter from the Dutch Republic active in London in the 1760s.

== Biography ==
According to the RKD, she was the daughter and pupil of the painter Herman van der Mijn. Her aunt Agatha, who was nine years older, and her siblings Frans, Gerard, George, Andreas, and Robert also became painters. Her father took his family and the family of Jacoba Maria van Nickelen, another pupil, with him to Dusseldorp to work for Johann Wilhelm, Elector Palatine. The flower painter Rachel Ruysch was also active in Dusseldorp in the years 1712-1716 when Cornelia was there. In 1722, she moved to London with her family and remained there. Only her brother George returned to Amsterdam.

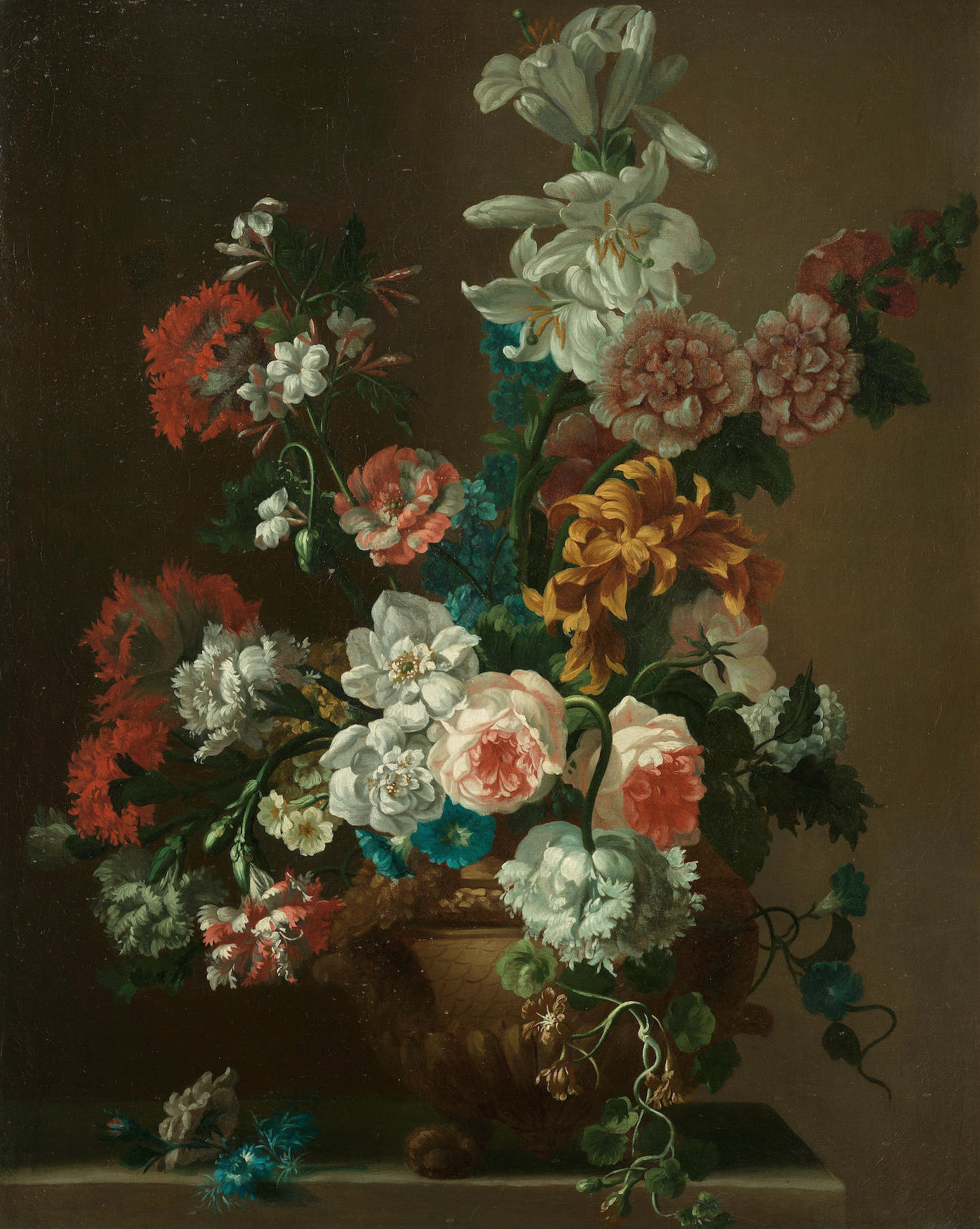
Flowers in vase, oil on canvas, 92,8 x 72,2 cm., private collection
