= Willem Troost =

Dutch painter

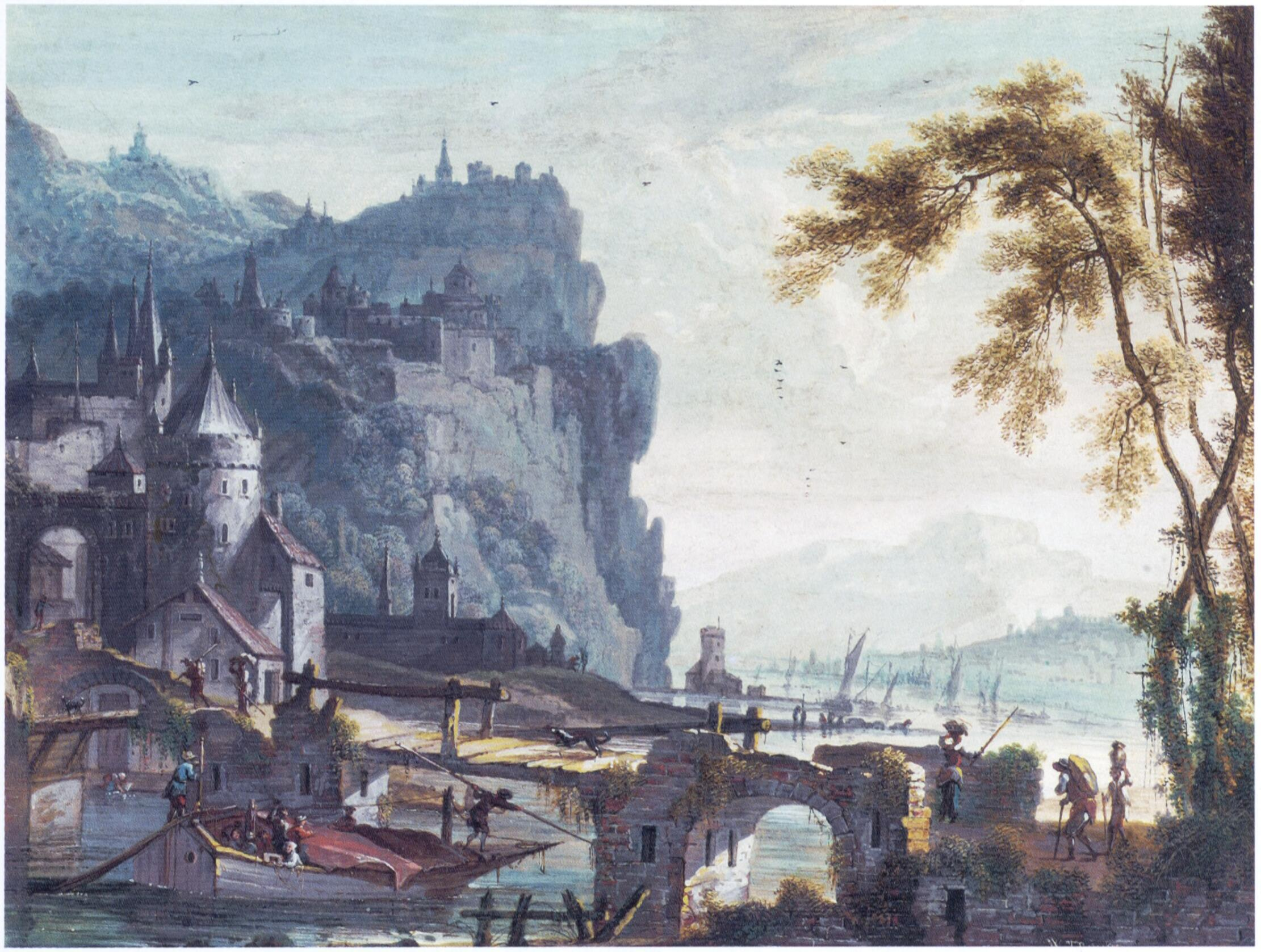
Fantasy Rhine landscape with castle town

Wilhelmus, or Willem Troost (1684–1752), was an 18th-century painter from the Dutch Republic.

== Biography ==
He was born in Amsterdam. According to the RKD he was a pupil of Johannes Glauber from 1704 to 1709 and became court painter in Dusseldorp in 1712. He also worked in Keulen, Duisburg & Kleef, before returning to the Netherlands and spending time in Haarlem from 1735 until 1745 before moving to Amsterdam. He is known for Italianate landscapes and interior decorations.

He married the painter Jacoba Maria van Nickelen, with whom he possibly travelled to Dusseldorp to become court painters for Johann Wilhelm, Elector Palatine. According to Jan van Gool he had been the sixth of seven sons and was first apprenticed to a clerk for eight years before becoming a pupil of Glauber. He and his wife eventually had eight children, of whom two were still alive when Van Gool was writing; a daughter who was a gifted musician and a son who was a good draughtsman and who designed patterns for silk fabrics. He is not to be confused with Willem Troost (1812–1893).
