= Eglon van der Neer =

Dutch painter

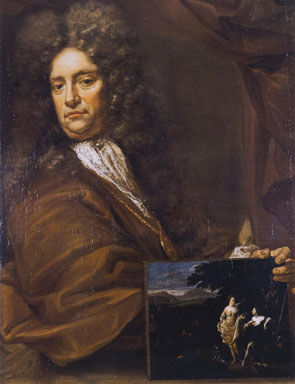
Selfportrait (1696) in Galleria degli Uffizi

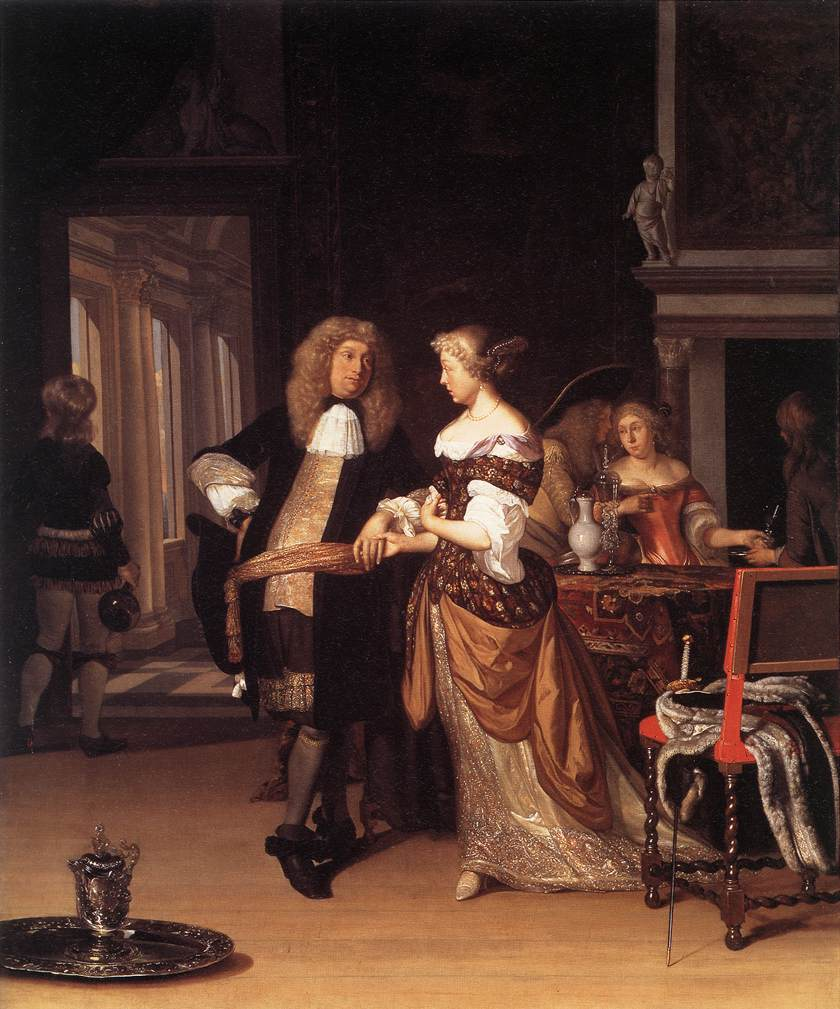
Elegant couple in an interior, 1678

Eglon van der Neer (1635/36 – 3 May 1703) was a Dutch painter of historical scenes, portraits and elegant, fashionable people, and later of landscapes.

== Life ==
Van der Neer was born in Amsterdam and likely first taught by his father, Aert van der Neer,. Eglon had a least five brothers and sisters, who were baptized in the Nieuwe Kerk between 1640 and 1650. He took lessons from Jacob van Loo, who was then one of the foremost figure painters in Amsterdam.

Around 1654, Van der Neer, who probably had just finished his education with van Loo, traveled to Orange, Vaucluse in the south of France and entered the service of Frederick, Burgrave of Dohna, governor of the Principality of Orange. Van der Neer stayed for three or four years in Orange and returned to Amsterdam by the end of 1658. There he married Maria Wagensvelt, the daughter of a wealthy Rotterdam notary. In 1663, van der Neer and his family moved to Rotterdam, where Adriaen van der Werff became his student. He stayed in Rotterdam until his wife died in 1677. In 1679, he moved to The Hague. In 1680 he became a member of the Confrerie Pictura there. Later that year he moved again, taking up his residence at Brussels, where he married the miniature painter Marie Du Chastel in the following year. They had nine children.

=== Painter for royalty ===
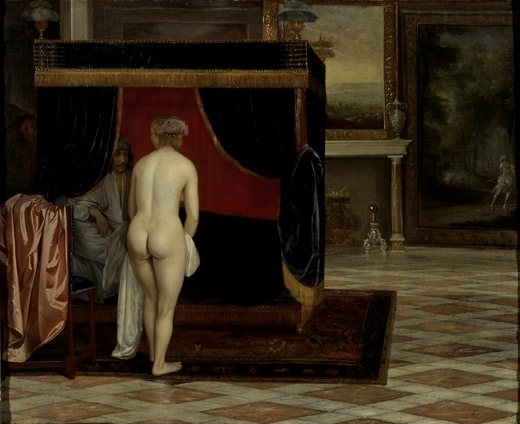
Kandaules' wife discovers Gyges, 1675-1680.

In Brussels, van der Neer established a good relationship with the governor of the Spanish Netherlands, the Marquess of Castanaga. In 1687, van der Neer was appointed court painter to the Spanish King Charles II of Spain. In 1689, when Carlos' first wife died, van der Neer portrayed one of the new wedding candidates, Maria Anna of Neuburg.

In 1695, Johann Wilhelm, Elector Palatine, bought a painting by van der Neer, when traveling through the Netherlands. This painting must have pleased him, because shortly thereafter the Elector Palatine contacted van der Neer directly and gave him commissions. In that same year Brussels was bombarded by French troops and van der Neer started to look for another place to begin a new life. The Elector Palatine had been looking for a replacement ever since his last court painter Johannes Spilberg had died in 1690. Van der Neer's second wife had died in 1692, and he met Spilberg's daughter, herself a qualified painter, Adriana Spilberg. They married in 1697 and in 1698 Johann Wilhelm offered Van der Neer the position at his court as head painter. Van der Neer thus settled in Düsseldorf and remained there for these last years of his life.

== Legacy ==
During his Amsterdam and Rotterdam period, van der Neer primarily painted genre scenes and portraits that betray a stunning variety of styles. His interior scenes show the influence of Pieter de Hooch, Gerard ter Borch, Gabriel Metsu and Frans van Mieris. Van der Neer painted only a handful of mythological and Biblical scenes. The early examples are very similar to his genre scenes and show figures in contemporary interiors. Later, in Brussels and Düsseldorf, van der Neer set his historical scenes outdoors, with a landscape setting. In these paintings he followed the example of Adam Elsheimer. His pure landscapes, without figures from literary sources, show other stylistic influences, such as Jan Brueghel the Elder, and Jacques d'Arthois. Most of van der Neer's paintings are small and his style is highly finished. However, he could work on a large scale and would then adjust his manner of painting.

== Gallery ==
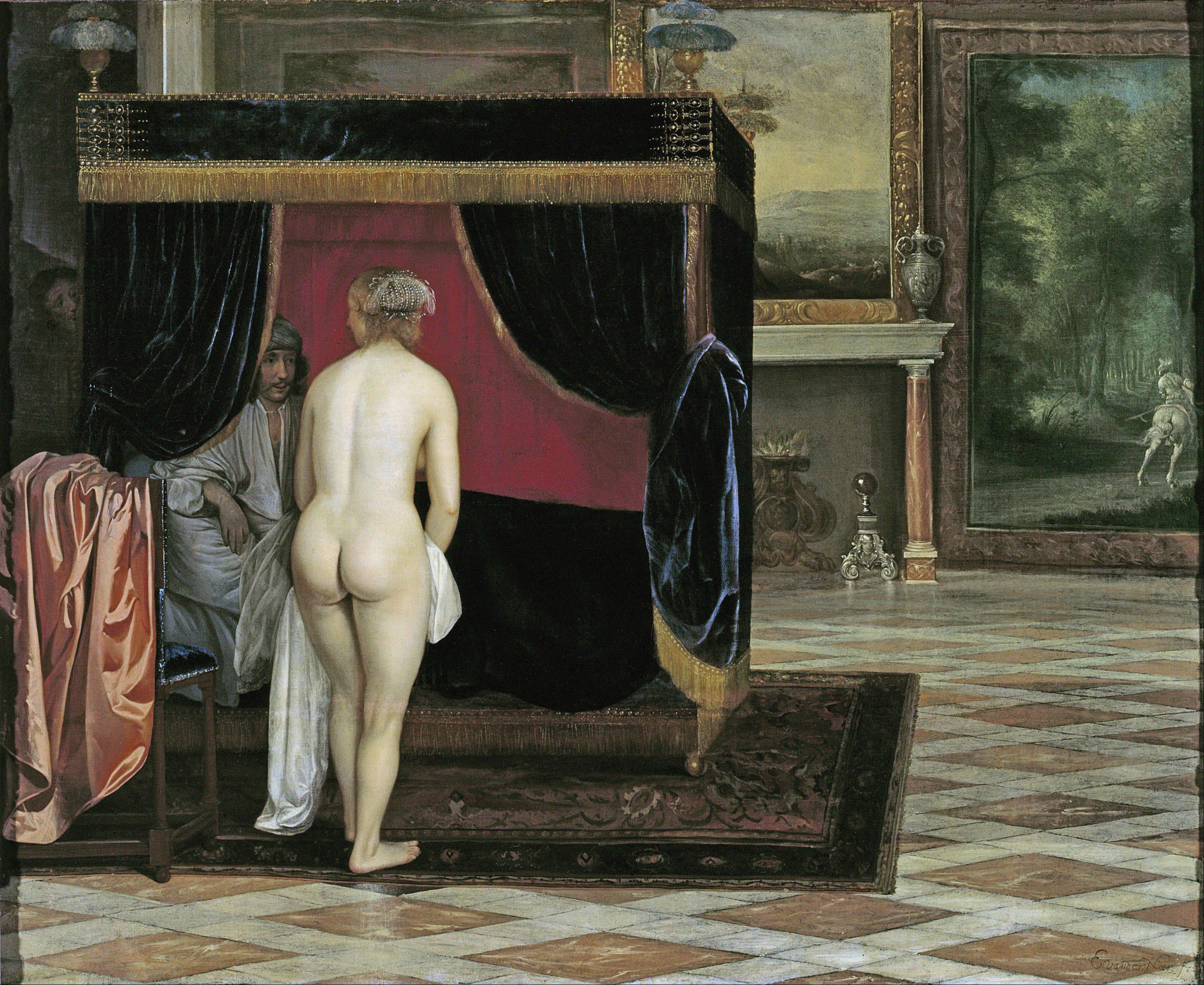
Candaules' Wife Discovering the Hiding Gyges, 1660-1662

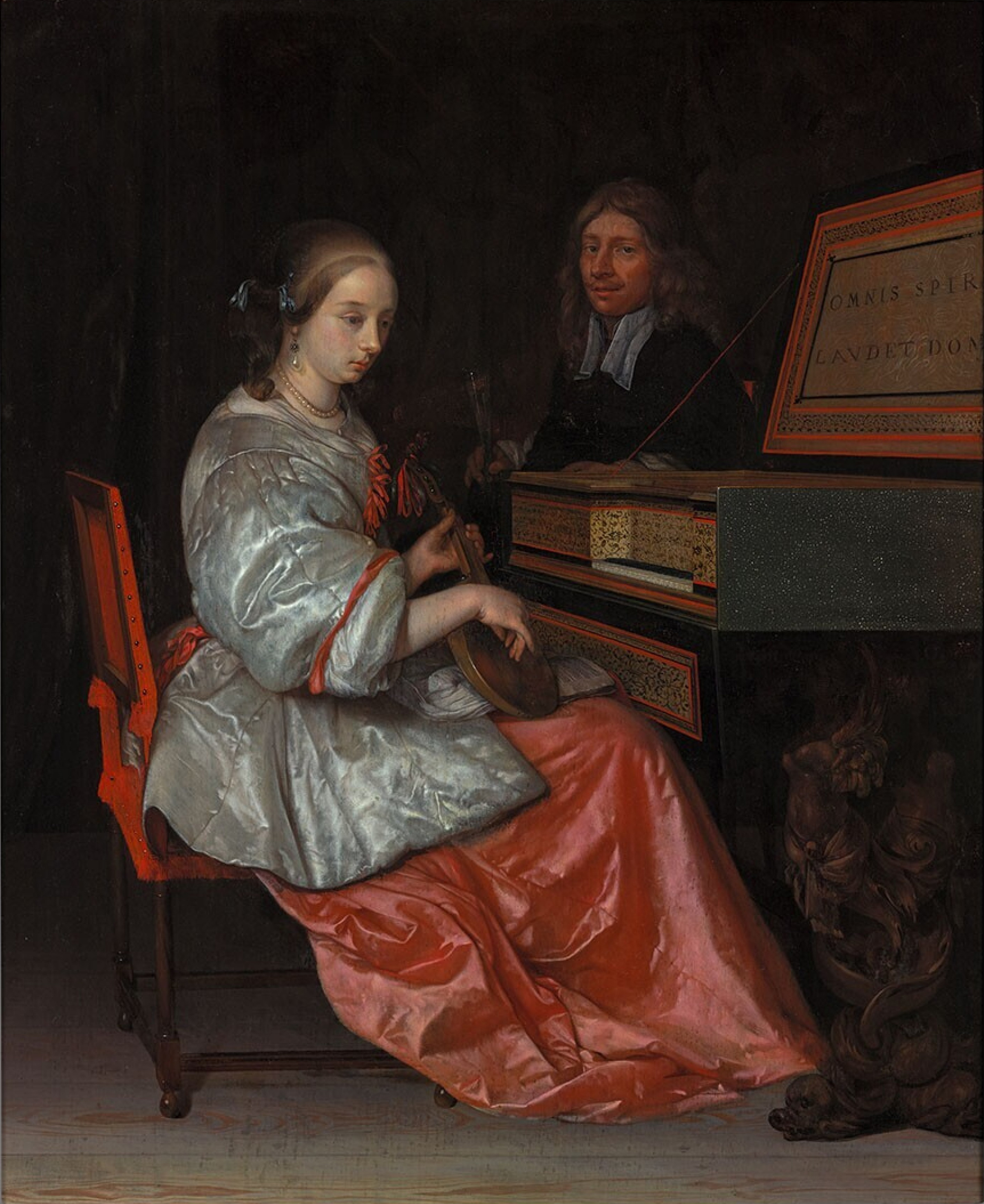
Woman at a virginal with a cittern on her lap, accompanied by a man, 1669

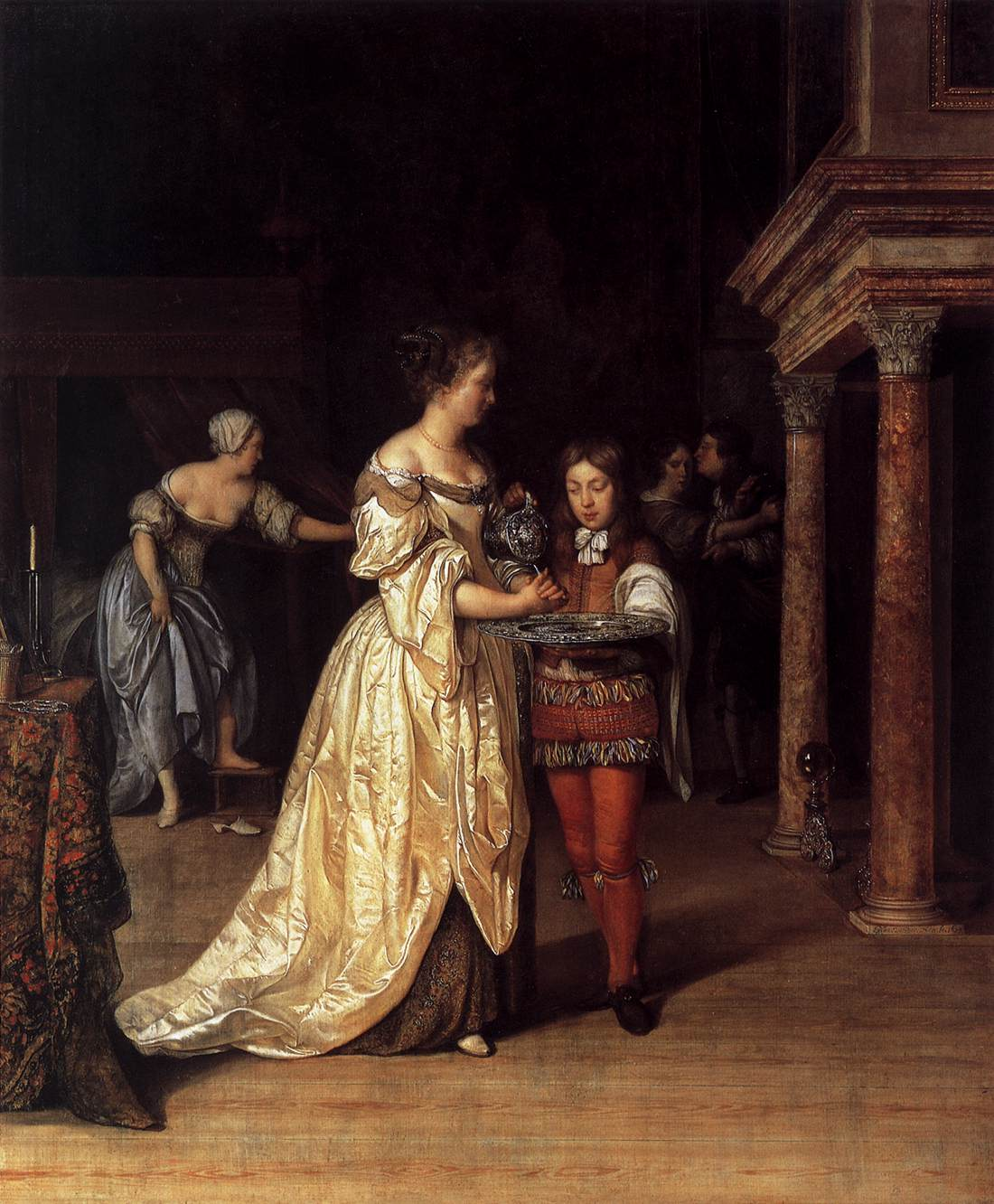
Interior with a Woman Washing her Hands, 1675

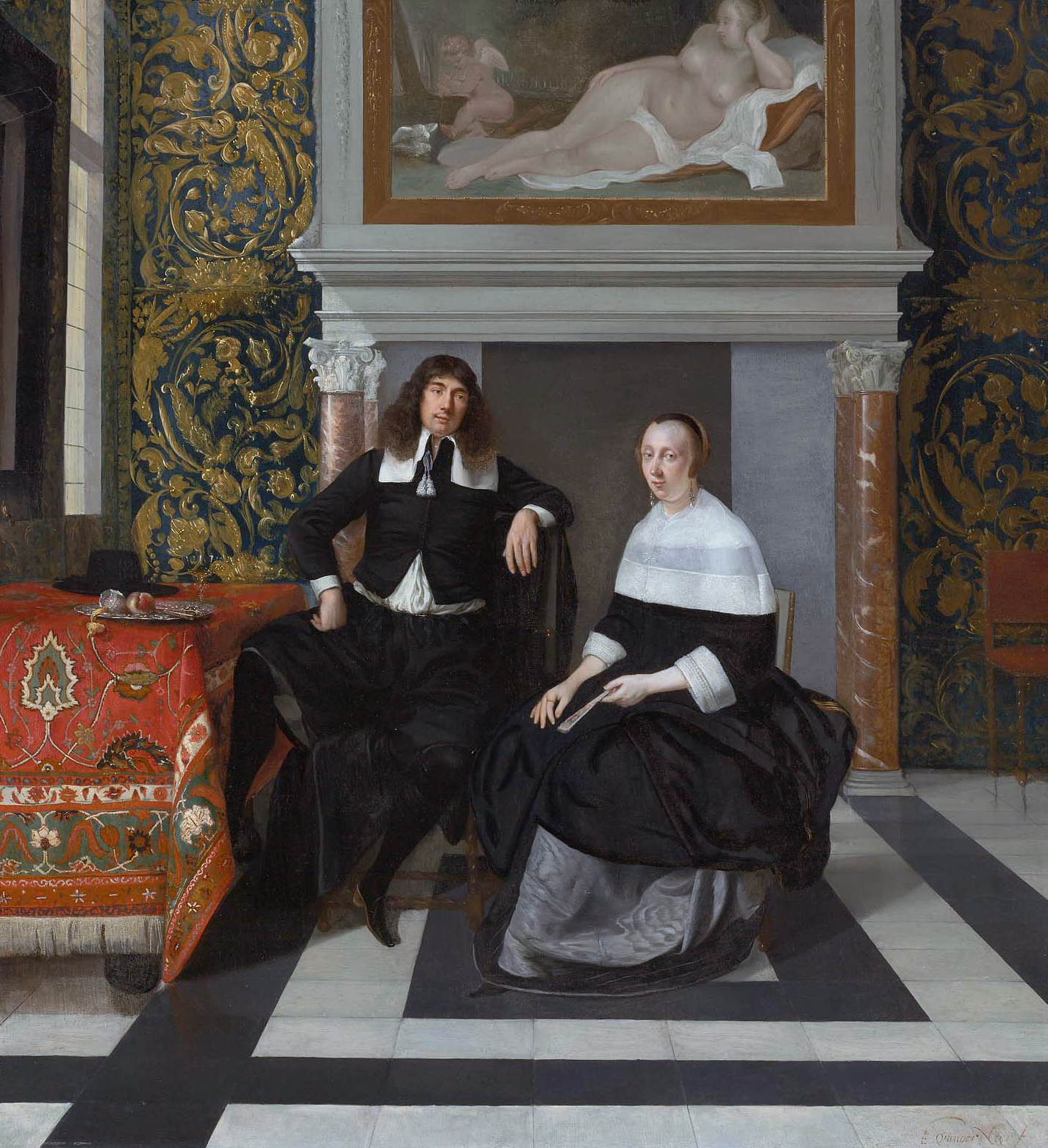
Portrait of a Man and Woman in an Interior, 1666

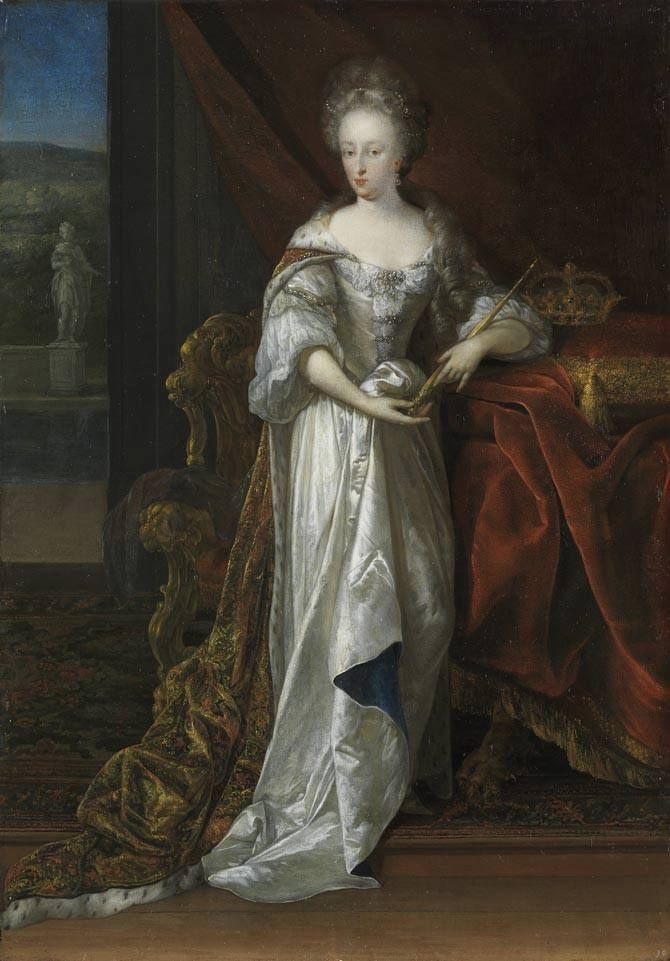
Maria Anna of Neuburg, Queen of Spain, 1689

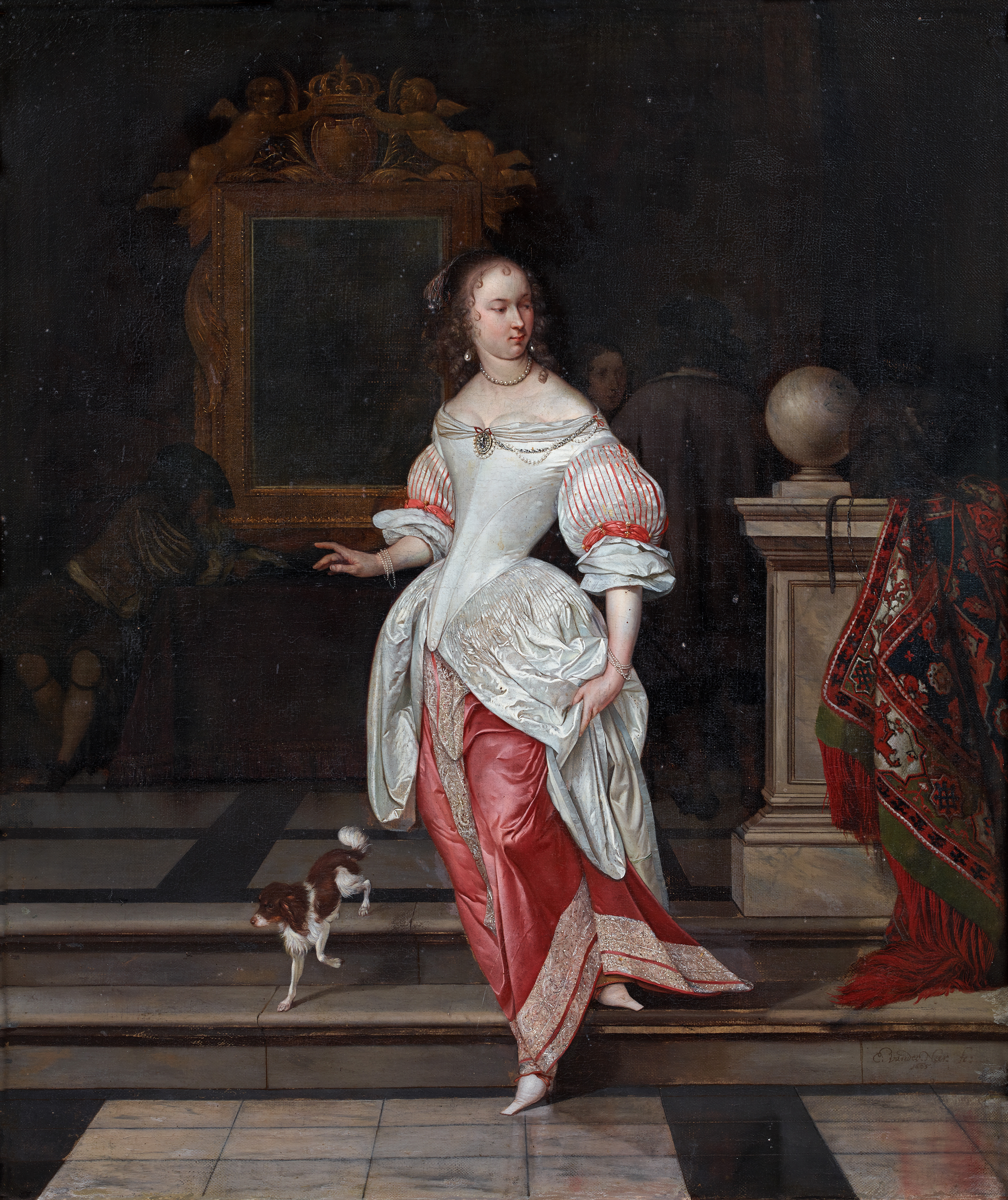
La Grande Dame, 1665

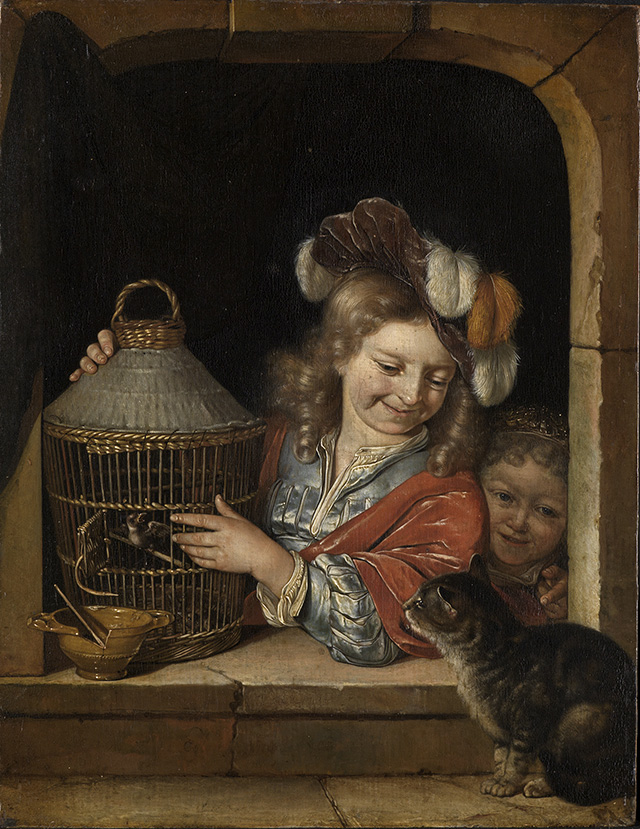
Two children with a cat and birdcage in a window, 1677
