= St. Andreas, Düsseldorf =

St. Andreas
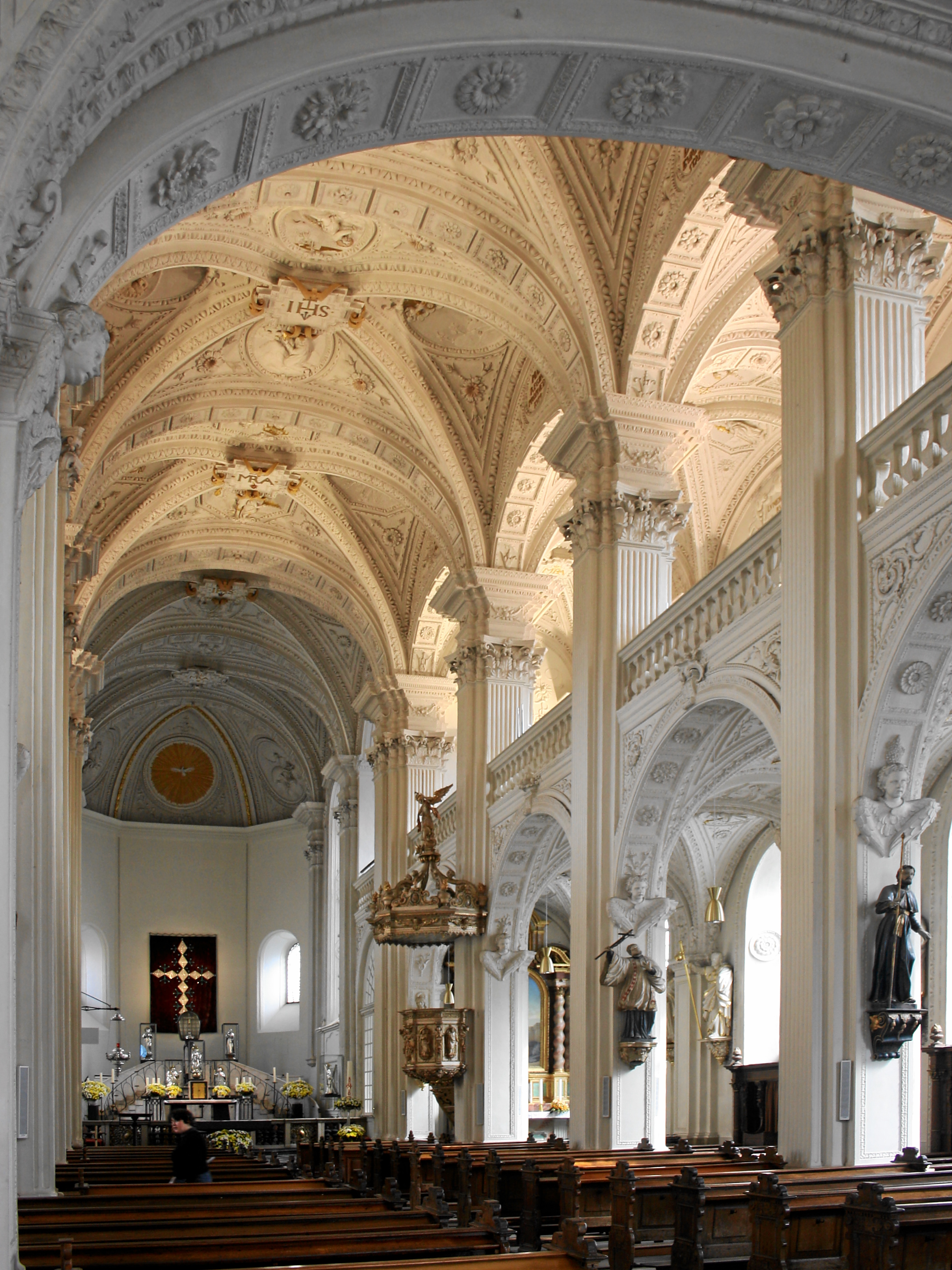

- 51°13′39″N 6°46′31″E
- Location: Andreasstraße 27; Düsseldorf
- Country: Germany
- Denomination: Roman Catholic
- Religious order: Dominican Order
- Website: www.dominikaner-duesseldorf.de

History
- Status: Parish church
- Dedication: Saint Andrew
- Consecrated: 1629

Architecture
- Functional status: Active
- Style: Baroque
- Groundbreaking: 1622

Administration
- Archdiocese: Cologne
- Parish: Sankt Andreas

Clergy
- Rector: Fr. P. Elias H. Füllenbach OP

The Church of St. Andreas (German: St. Andreas) is a Roman Catholic parish church situated in the center of the German city of Düsseldorf. It is the priory church of the local community of Dominican Friars, who also administer the much older Collegiate Church of St Lambertus.

== History ==
The church, dedicated to St. Andrew, was constructed between 1622 and 1629 in the South German baroque style. It was originally built for the Jesuits, who arrived in Düsseldorf in 1619, and served as the "court church" for the Counts palatine of Neuburg (House of Palatinate-Neuburg) from 1708. After the dissolution of the Jesuit order in August 1773, it served as a parish church until 2005, when it became the monastery church of the Dominican Order. The building itself is now owned by the land of North Rhine Westphalia.

The church is furnished with stucco by Johannes Kuhn from Strassburg and life-size sculptures of the apostles and of saints of the Society of Jesus.

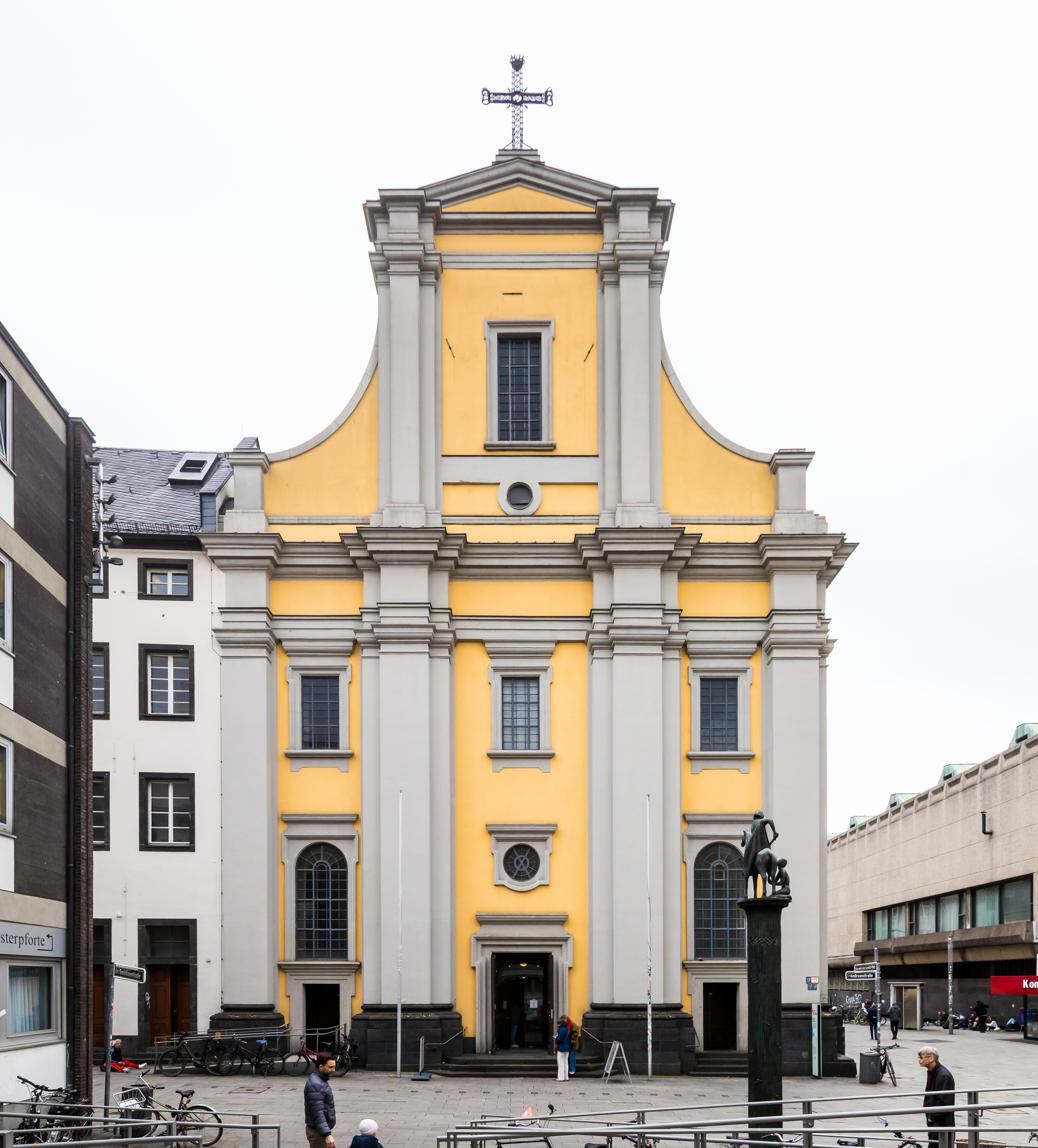
Facade

In the late 17th and early 18th centuries, the church was an important center of musical culture in Düsseldorf. The composer Johann Hugo von Wilderer served as its organist. The mausoleum, designed by Venetian architect Simone del Sarto, contains the tombs of several Electors Palatine, including that of Johann Wilhelm. The high altar of the church was destroyed during World War II. The new altar, designed by Ewald Mataré was built in 1960. Paintings by Ernst Deger can be found in the church's two side altars which are dedicated to the Virgin Mary.

In 1972 the church came under the pastoral care of the local community of Dominican Friars and became their priory church.

== Organ ==
The organ dates back to an instrument built in 1782 by Peter Kemper, in a casing by Bernhard Orlinski and Josef Zimmermann. In World War II the organ was damaged. In 1953 it was restored and expanded by 18 stops by the organ builder Fabritius. In 1970/71 and again in 2003, the organ was restored by Rudolf von Beckerath Orgelbau.

== See also ==
- List of Jesuit sites
