= George van der Mijn =

Dutch painter

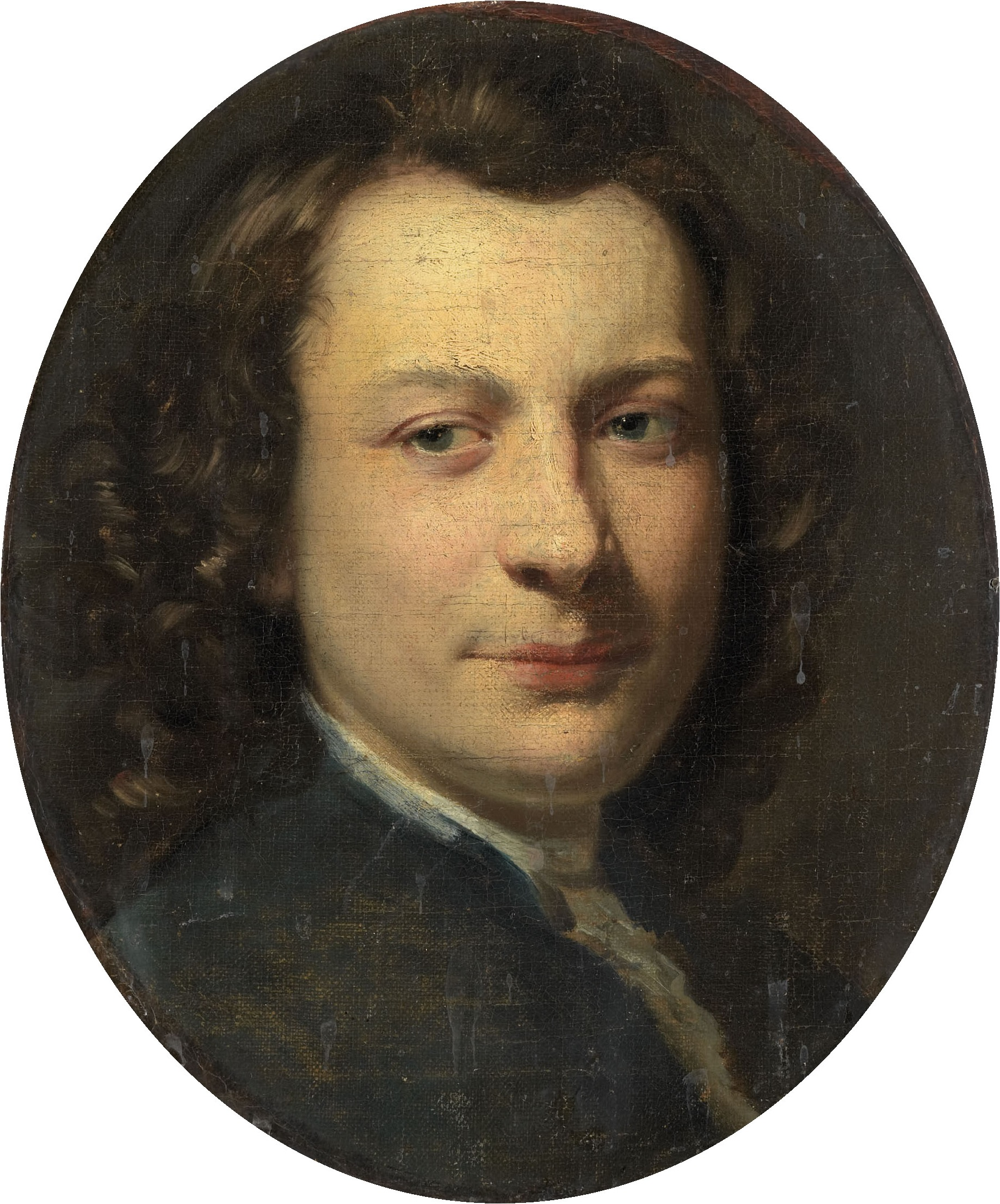
Portrait of George van der Mijn by his brother Frans van der Mijn

George van der Mijn (1723–1763) was an 18th-century painter from the Dutch Republic.

== Biography ==
According to the Netherlands Institute for Art History (Dutch: Rijksbureau voor Kunsthistorische Documentatie or RKD) he was the son of Herman van der Mijn, who was born in London after his father moved there. He is known for portraits and genre works and his pupil was Dirk van Dijl.

Johan van Gool wrote about him, his father, his brothers Robert, Francis, Andreas and Gerard, and his sister Cornelia who were all good painters in their own right. Van Gool mentioned that another brother Willem could have been a good painter, but fell through the ice while skating and died young. He probably discussed his family with George himself, since they were contemporaries in Amsterdam during the period Van Gool was working on his book.
