= Jan van Nickelen =

Dutch Golden Age painter

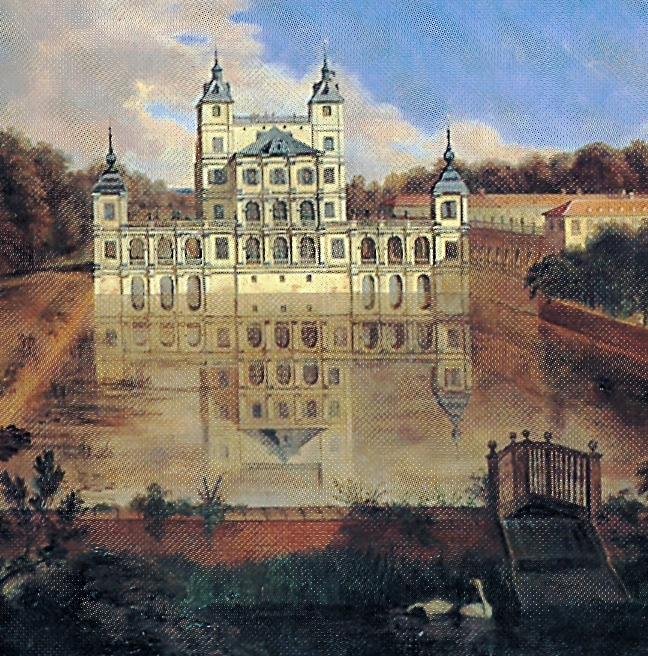
Schloss Benrath, 1715

Jan van Nickelen (1655, Haarlem – 1721, Kassel), was a Dutch Golden Age painter.

== Biography ==
According to Houbraken he learned to paint from his father Isaak van Nickelen, who taught him perspective and who sent him to school to learn Latin and French. He was very inventive and discovered an innovation in textile production, which he was unable to exploit due to lack of funds. He also invented a new type of hard varnish, which he used in the production of chassinets, a painted silk backdrop for shadow plays and room screen decorations. His chassinets were popular with Johann Wilhelm, Elector Palatine, whom he met through his Amsterdam friend Herman van der Mijn and Jan Frans van Douven. He won a commission to make screens with views of his properties, and Van der Mijn became the teacher of his daughter, the flower painter Jacoba Maria van Nickelen. After the death of the Elector in 1716 he moved to Kassel where he worked five years for the Landgrave on decorations for the residence "Slot Winterkaste" there, until his death cut the works short.

According to the RKD He became a member of the Haarlem Guild of St. Luke in 1688, moved to Dusseldorp in 1712, and moved to Kassel in 1716.
