= Adriana Spilberg =

Dutch artist (1652–1700)

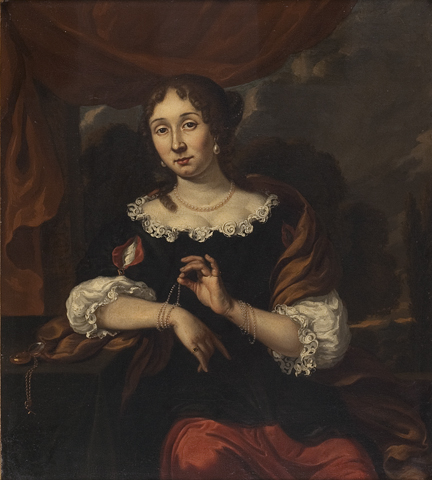
Portrait of a woman

Adriana Spilberg (1652–1700) was a Dutch Golden Age painter active at the court of Johann Wilhelm, Elector Palatine.

== Biography ==
She was born in Amsterdam. According to Houbraken her father Johannes Spilberg taught her to paint in oils, crayon and pastels and she became quite famous in Amsterdam. Spilberg kept her in Amsterdam while he was working for Johann Wilhelm, Elector Palatine. When his patron married Archduchess Maria Anna Josepha of Austria, she asked Spilberg to bring his family, including his famous daughter, to court, which he did, and Adriana became court painter for the archduchess in 1681 in Düsseldorf. Adriana married the painter Wilhelm Breekvelt there and had three sons by him, but he died in 1687. In 1689 her patroness died and Johann Wilhelm remarried Anna Maria Luisa de' Medici. In 1690 her father died, and he was replaced as court painter by Eglon van der Neer, whom she married after 11 years of widowhood in 1697.

According to the RKD she was the pupil and dochter of Johannes Spilberg, wife of Willem Breekvelt after 1687, and after 1697 the wife of Eglon van der Neer. She died in 1700 in Düsseldorf.
