= Wilhelm Breckvelt =

Dutch Golden Age painter

Wilhelm Breckvelt, or Breekvelt (1658 – 1687, Düsseldorf), was a Dutch Golden Age painter.

== Biography ==
According to Houbraken he married Adriana Spilberg, who had many suitors, but her father would only marry her to another painter. Adriana had 3 sons by him, but he died young at 29 only 3 years after they married.

According to the RKD he is known for a signed drawing in the university library of Leiden. He is registered in Düsseldorf in 1658-1687.
