= Isaak van Nickelen =

Dutch painter

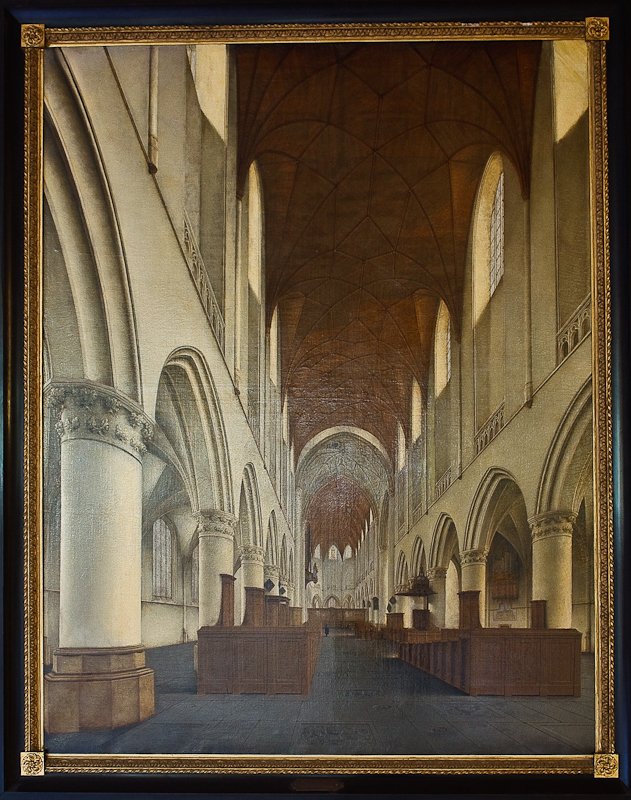
Interior of the St. Bavochurch, Haarlem

Isaak van Nickelen (1632–1703) was a Dutch Golden Age painter.

== Biography ==
Van Nickelen was born and died in Haarlem. According to Houbraken he painted church interiors in the manner of Hendrick Cornelisz. van Vliet.

Houbraken mentioned him in relation to his son, the landscape painter Jan van Nickelen.

According to the RKD in 1660 he became master of the Haarlem Guild of St. Luke and was successful with his paintings of church interiors, but he lived to a great age and went bankrupt near the end of his life in 1698.
