= James Latham (painter) =

Irish portrait painter

James Latham (c. 1696 – 26 January 1747) was an Irish portrait painter.

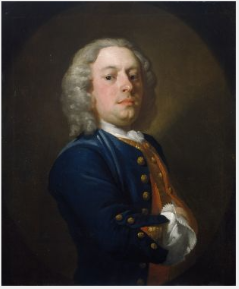
James Latham, self-portrait, c. 1730

== Biography ==
James Latham was born in Thurles, County Tipperary, in the Kingdom of Ireland possibly related to the Latham family of Meldrum and Ballysheehan. After beginning his art practice, Latham studied in Antwerp during the academic year of 1724–25, where he became a Master of the Guild of St Luke. He returned to Dublin by 1725and may have visited England in the 1740s, as his work from this period shows the influence of Joseph Highmore, Charles Jervas, and William Hogarth. Anthony Pasquin memorably dubbed Latham "Ireland's Van Dyck." Latham died in Dublin on 26 January 1747.

James Latham (1696–1747). Portrait of a girl holding a rose.

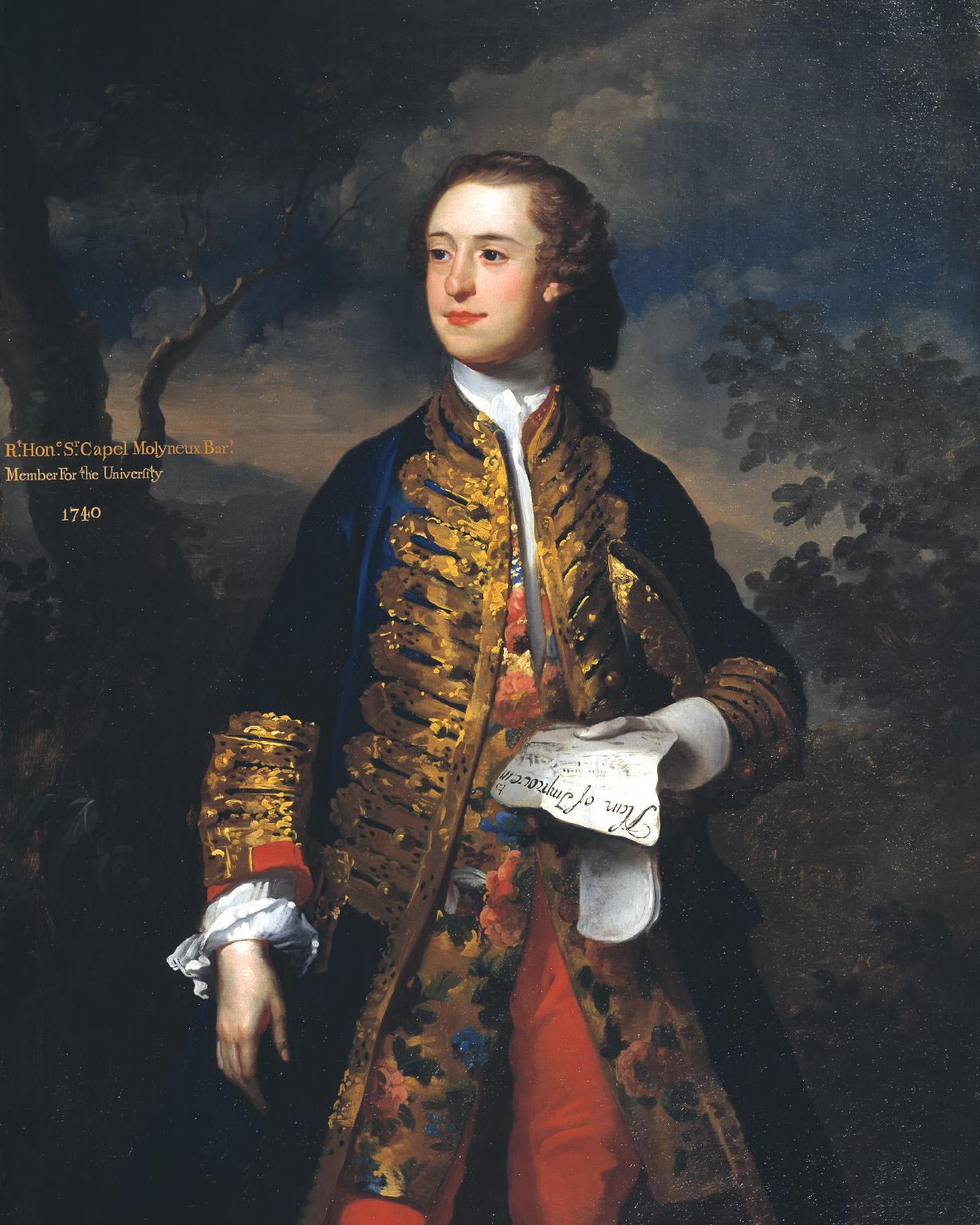
The Rt Hon. Sir Capel Molyneux, 1740. Purchased 1947. http://www.tate.org.uk/art/work/N05801

Several of James Latham's portraits are in the National Gallery of Ireland collection in Dublin. Notable works include the portrait of MP Charles Tottenham (1694–1758) of New Ross, Co. Wexford, known as "Tottenham in his Boots" (Cat. No. 411), and a portrait of Bishop Robert Clayton (1697–1758) and his wife Katherine (Cat. No. 4370). In 1947, two centuries after the artist's death, the London Tate Gallery purchased Latham's portrait of Sir Capel Molyneux (ref. N05801).
