= Johann Wilhelm, Elector Palatine =

Elector Palatine from 1690 to 1716

John William
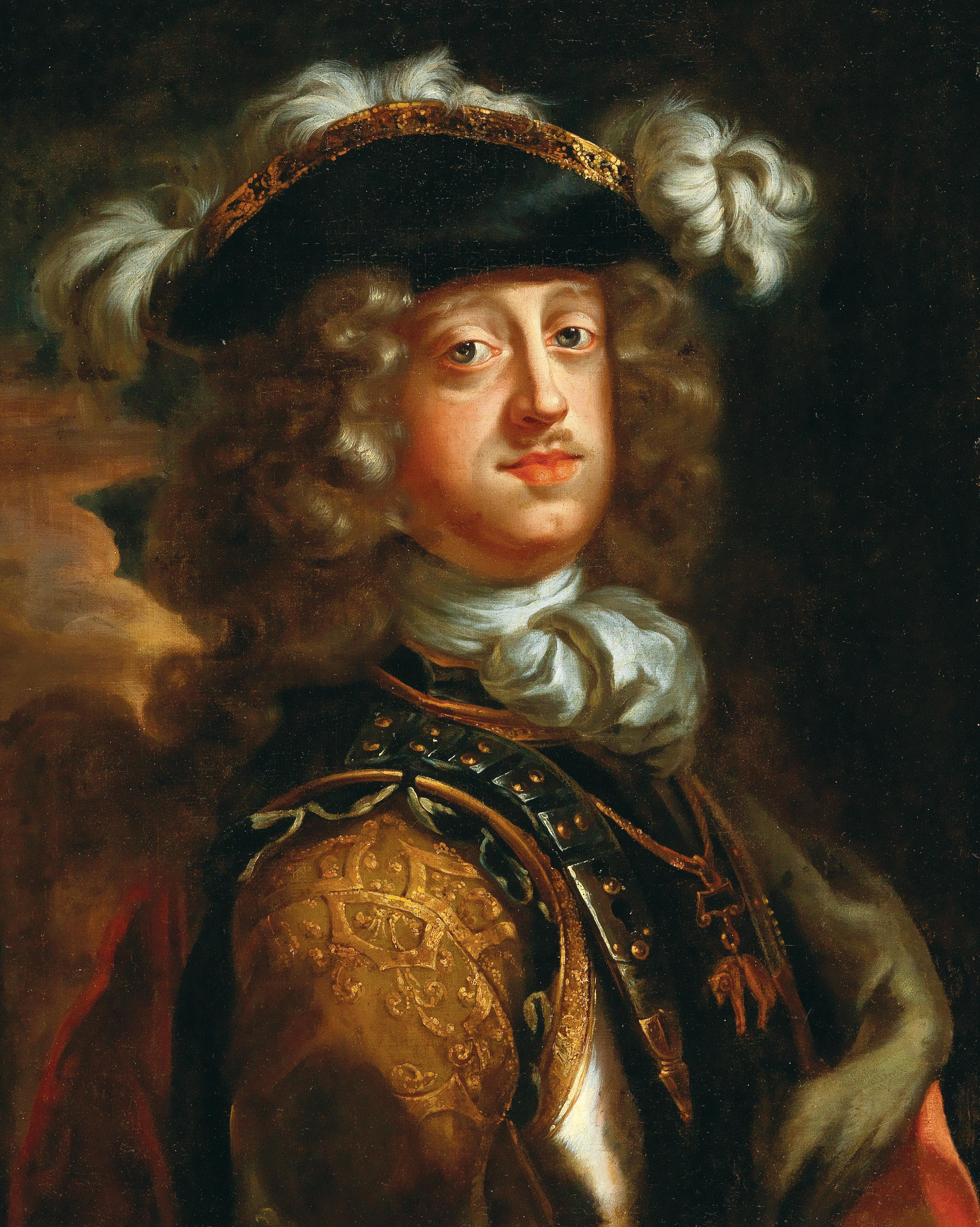

Elector Palatine Count Palatine of Neuburg
- Reign: 2 September 1690 – 8 June 1716
- Predecessor: Philip William
- Successor: Charles III Philip
- Born: 19 April 1658; Düsseldorf, United Duchies of Jülich-Cleves-Berg, Holy Roman Empire
- Died: 8 June 1716 (aged 58); Düsseldorf, United Duchies of Jülich-Cleves-Berg, Holy Roman Empire
- Burial: St. Andreas, Düsseldorf
- Spouse: Archduchess Maria Anna Josepha of Austria (m. 1678; died 1689) Anna Maria Luisa de' Medici (m. 1691)
- House: Wittelsbach
- Father: Philip William, Elector Palatine
- Mother: Landgravine Elisabeth Amalie of Hesse-Darmstadt

John William, Elector Palatine (Jan Wellem in Low German, English: John William; 19 April 1658 – 8 June 1716) of the Wittelsbach dynasty was Elector Palatine (1690–1716), Duke of Neuburg (1690–1716), Duke of Jülich and Berg (1679–1716), and Duke of Upper Palatinate and Cham (1707–1714). From 1697 onwards Johann Wilhelm was also Count of Megen.

== Early life and background ==
He was the son of Count Palatine Philip William of Neuburg and Elisabeth Amalie of Hesse-Darmstadt and was born in Düsseldorf, where he resided, rather than in Heidelberg, which had been largely destroyed by French troops during the Nine Years' War. He was educated by the Jesuits and in 1674 he made a grand tour to Italy.

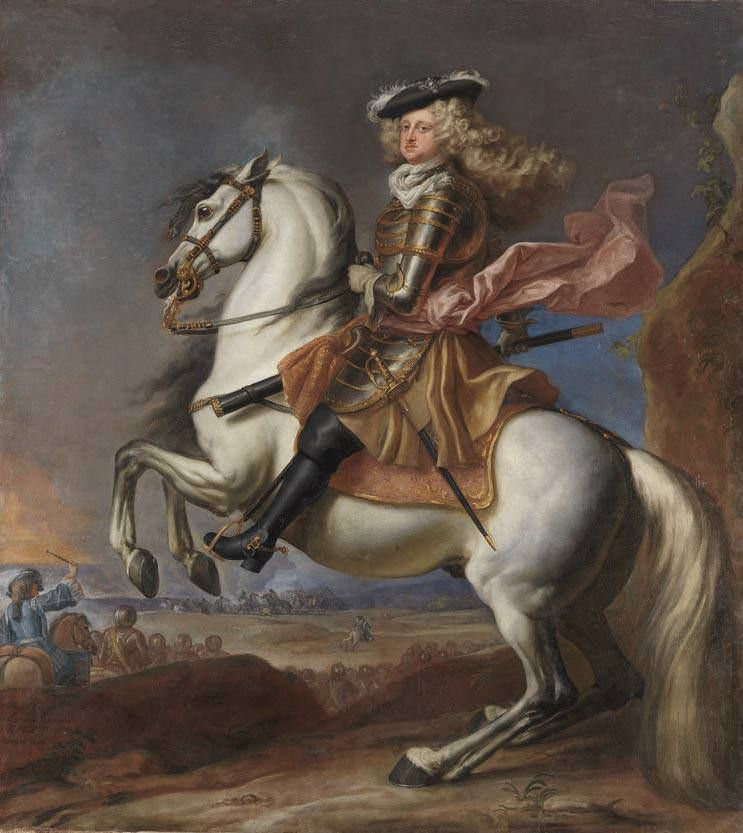
Equestrian portrait of Johann Wilhelm by Anthoni Schoonjans, 1702

His brother was Franz Ludwig, Count Palatine of Neuburg, his sisters were married to Holy Roman Emperor Leopold I, Peter II of Portugal, and Charles II of Spain.

== Succession ==
As a gift to Johann Wilhelm and his new bride, Archduchess Maria Anna Josepha of Austria, Johann Wilhelm's father ceded to them the Duchies of Jülich and Berg in 1679.

Johann Wilhelm later also succeeded his father as Elector Palatine in 1690. In the Peace of Rijswijk (1697), he was restored to many of the possessions which had been taken by the French, with the provision that the Electoral Palatinate not revert to Protestantism. This provision made him unpopular in the Palatinate and with Protestants.

During the War of the Spanish Succession Johann Wilhelm received also the Bavarian Upper Palatinate, which was returned to Bavaria in 1714. He died in Düsseldorf and was buried in the St. Andreas Church. Having no son, Johann Wilhelm was succeeded by his brother Charles III Philip, Elector Palatine.

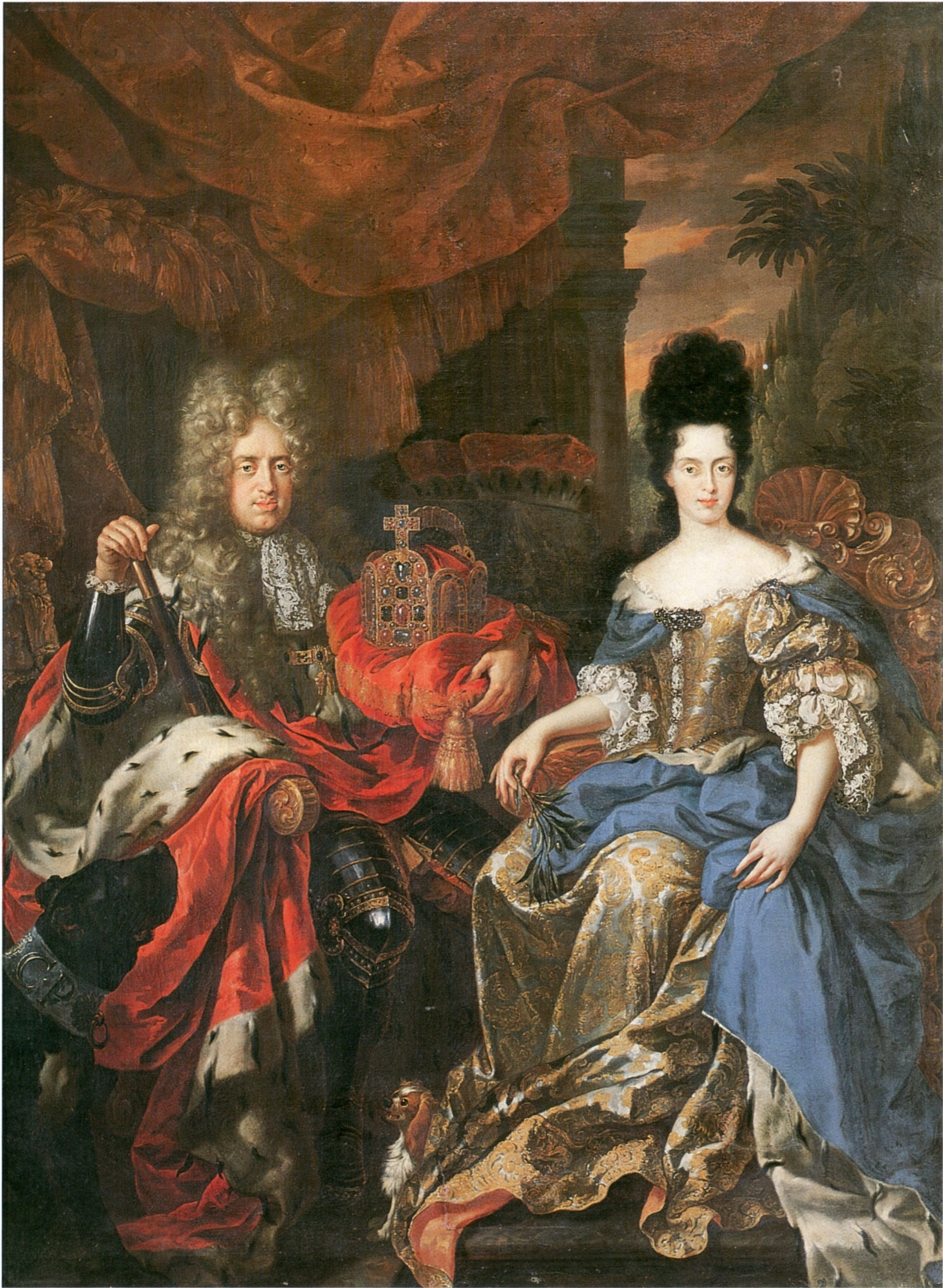
Double portrait of Johann Wilhelm von der Pfalz and Anna Maria Luisa de' Medici

== Marriages ==
On 25 October 1678, in Wiener Neustadt, Johann Wilhelm married Archduchess Maria Anna Josepha of Austria. She was a daughter of Ferdinand III, Holy Roman Emperor, and his third wife, Eleanor of Mantua. The wedding ceremony was performed by Archbishop Leopold Karl von Kollonitsch.

The couple settled in Düsseldorf, where they led an elaborate royal household. During their marriage, Maria Anna Josepha gave birth to two children, but neither survived infancy:

- A son (b. and d. Düsseldorf, 6 February 1683)
- A son (b. and d. Vienna, 5 February 1686)

Maria Anna Josepha died in 1689 of tuberculosis. A couple of years later, on 29 April 1691, Johann Wilhelm married by proxy Anna Maria Luisa de' Medici, daughter of Cosimo III de' Medici, Grand Duke of Tuscany. She departed for Düsseldorf on 6 May 1691, accompanied by her younger brother, Gian Gastone. Johann Wilhelm surprised her at Innsbruck, where they officially married.

Anna Maria Luisa became pregnant in 1692; however, she miscarried. Historians believed incorrectly that shortly after her arrival, she contracted syphilis from her adulterous husband, which might have explained why Anna Maria Luisa and Johann Wilhelm failed to produce any children. In 2012, after concern caused by the 1966 Flood of the Arno River, the bones of Anna Maria Luisa were exhumed. A scientific examination found no traces of syphilis.

== Art collections ==
He was more popular in Jülich-Berg, where he erected impressive buildings such as the Bensberg Castle and led a lavish court which gave work to many artists and artisans, including the court painters Johannes Spilberg, his daughter Adriana, her later husband Eglon van der Neer, Adriaen van der Werff, Jan Frans van Douven, Herman van der Mijn, Jan van Nickelen, his daughter Jacoba Maria van Nickelen, her husband Willem Troost, Anthoni Schoonjans, Rachel Ruysch, Godfried Schalcken, and Jan Weenix with his daughter Maria Weenix. His enormous collection of paintings by Rubens can still be seen in the Alte Pinakothek in Munich.

His widow Anna Maria Luisa was the last scion of the House of Medici. A patron of the arts, she bequeathed the Medicis’ large art collection, including the contents of the Uffizi, Palazzo Pitti, and the Medicean villas, which she inherited upon the death of her brother Gian Gastone in 1737, and her Palatine treasures to the Tuscan state, on the condition that no part of it could be removed from the capital Florence. Therefore, these treasures are still to be visited in Florence today.

In Düsseldorf, the Jan-Wellem Square is named after Johann Wilhelm.

== Ancestry ==
Ancestors of Johann Wilhelm, Elector Palatine

8. Philip Louis, Count Palatine of Neuburg
4. Wolfgang Wilhelm, Count Palatine of Neuburg
9. Anna of Cleves
2. Philipp Wilhelm, Elector Palatine
10. William V, Duke of Bavaria
5. Duchess Magdalene of Bavaria
11. Duchess Renata of Lorraine
1. Johann Wilhelm, Elector Palatine
12. Louis V, Landgrave of Hesse-Darmstadt
6. George II, Landgrave of Hesse-Darmstadt
13. Margravine Magdalena of Brandenburg
3. Landgravine Elisabeth Amalie of Hesse-Darmstadt
14. John George I, Elector of Saxony
7. Princess Sophia Eleonore of Saxony
15. Duchess Magdalene Sibylle of Prussia

== Bibliography ==
- Alessandro Cont, La Chiesa dei principi. Le relazioni tra Reichskirche, dinastie sovrane tedesche e stati italiani (1688-1763), preface of Elisabeth Garms-Cornides, Trento, Provincia autonoma di Trento, 2018, pp. 103–138.

Johann Wilhelm, Elector Palatine House of Wittelsbach Born: 1658 Died: 1716
Regnal titles
Preceded by Philip William	Duke of Jülich and Berg; 1679–1716	Succeeded by Charles III Philip
Preceded by Philip William	Count Palatine of Neuburg; Elector Palatine; 1690–1716	Succeeded by Charles III Philip
