= Eibner =

- Language(s): German

Origin
- Meaning: derived from eiben, meaning 'yewen' or 'yew-like'

Eibner is a surname of German origin. The meaning is most likely derived from the German adjective eiben, meaning yewen or yew-like. Notable people with the surname include:

- Alexander Eibner (1862–1935), German painter, and chemist
- Brett Eibner (born 1988), American professional baseball player
- John Eibner, American Christian human rights activist
- Friedrich Eibner (1826-1877), German painter of Architectural subjects
