= Palatinate-Sulzbach-Hilpoltstein =

Palatinate-Sulzbach-Hilpoltstein; Pfalz-Sulzbach-Hilpoltstein
'1614 - 1644
Capital; Circle; Bench	Hilpoltstein none none
Partitioned from Palatinate-Neuburg	1614
Extinct; to Palatinate-Sulzbach	1644

Palatinate-Sulzbach-Hilpoltstein was a state of the Holy Roman Empire based around Hilpoltstein in modern central Bavaria, Germany.

Palatinate-Sulzbach-Hilpoltstein was created in 1614 out of the partition of the territories of Philip Louis of Palatinate-Neuburg for his youngest son John Frederick. John Frederick died in 1644 without heirs so Sulzbach-Hilpoltstein was inherited by Palatinate-Sulzbach.
