= Johann Friedrich, Count Palatine of Sulzbach-Hilpoltstein =

Count Palatine of Sulzbach-Hilpoltstein from 1614 to 1644

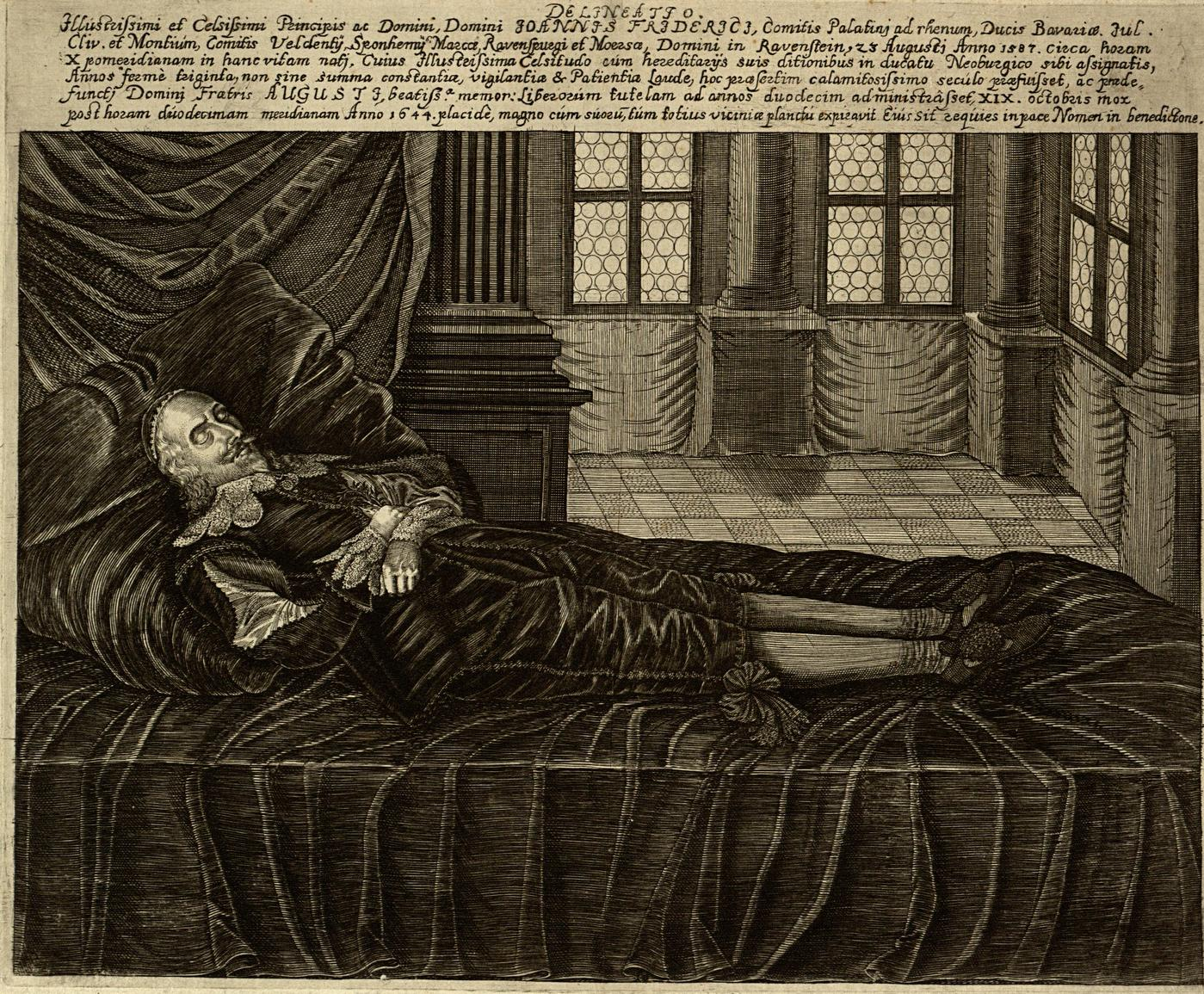
- Born: 23 August 1587; Neuburg
- Died: 19 October 1644 (aged 57); Hilpoltstein
- Noble family: House of Wittelsbach
- Spouse: Sophie Agnes of Hesse-Darmstadt
- Father: Philipp Ludwig, Count Palatine of Neuburg
- Mother: Anna of Cleves

Johann Friedrich (23 August 1587 – 19 October 1644) was the Count Palatine of Sulzbach-Hilpoltstein from 1614 until 1644.

== Life ==
Johann Friedrich was born in Neuburg in 1587 as the youngest son of Philipp Ludwig, Count Palatine of Neuburg and Anna of Cleves. After his father's death in 1614, his territories were partitioned between Johann Friedrich and his brothers; Johann Friedrich being the youngest he received the Lordship of Hilpoltstein. He died in Hilpoltstein in 1644 and was buried in Lauingen.

== Marriage ==
Johann Friedrich married Sophie Agnes (12 January 1604 – 8 September 1664), daughter of Landgrave Louis V of Hesse-Darmstadt, in 1624 and had the following children:

1. Anne Louise (11 October 1626 – 23 February 1627)
2. Maria Magdalena (27 February 1628 – 17 June 1629)
3. Philipp Ludwig (26 February 1629 – 8 August 1632)
4. Johann Friedrich (25 March 1630 – 22 May 1630)
5. unnamed daughter (22 April 1631)
6. Maria Eleanore (28 March 1632 – 23 November 1632)
7. Joanna Sophie (2 September 1635 – 19 August 1636)
8. Anne Magdalena (5 March 1638 – 29 July 1638)

== Ancestors ==
Ancestors of Johann Friedrich, Count Palatine of Sulzbach-Hilpoltstein

8. Louis II, Count Palatine of Zweibrücken
4. Wolfgang, Count Palatine of Zweibrücken
9. Elisabeth of Hesse
2. Philipp Ludwig, Count Palatine of Neuburg
10. Philip I, Landgrave of Hesse
5. Anna of Hesse
11. Christine of Saxony
1.Johann Friedrich, Count Palatine of Sulzbach-Hilpoltstein
12. John III, Duke of Cleves
6. Wilhelm, Duke of Jülich-Cleves-Berg
13. Maria of Jülich-Berg
3. Anna of Cleves
14. Ferdinand I, Holy Roman Emperor
7. Archduchess Maria of Austria
15. Anne of Bohemia and Hungary

Regnal titles
Preceded by Philipp Ludwig	Count Palatine of Sulzbach-Hilpoltstein; 1614 – 1644	Succeeded by Christian Augustus
