= Hilpoltstein =

- Town
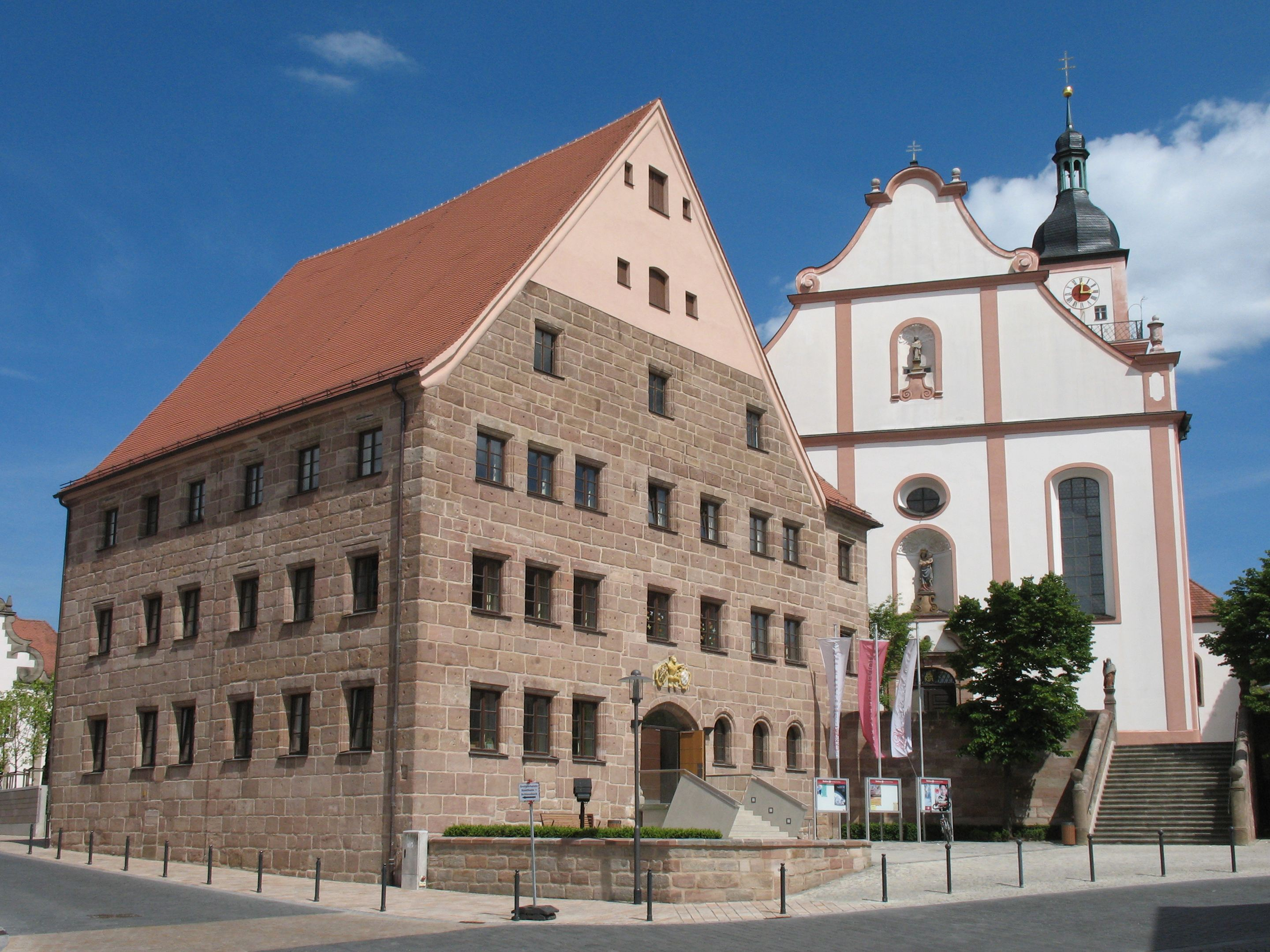
- Former residence of Johann Friedrich, Count Palatine of Sulzbach-Hilpoltstein and Church of Saint John the Baptist

- Coat of arms

- Location of Hilpoltstein within Roth district
- Interactive map of Hilpoltstein
- Location within Germany Location within Bavaria
- Coordinates: 49°11′N 11°11′E
- Country: Germany
- State: Bavaria
- Admin. region: Middle Franconia
- District: Roth

Government
  - Mayor (2020–26): Markus Mahl (SPD)

Area
  - Total: 89.72 km^{2} (34.64 sq mi)
- Elevation: 380 m (1,250 ft)

Population (2025-12-31)
  - Total: 13,707
  - Density: 152.8/km^{2} (395.7/sq mi)
- Time zone: UTC+01:00 (CET)
  - Summer (DST): UTC+02:00 (CEST)
- Postal codes: 91161
- Dialling codes: 09174
- Vehicle registration: RH, HIP
- Website: www.hilpoltstein.de

Hilpoltstein (German pronunciation: [ˈhɪlpɔltˌʃtaɪn]) is a town in the district of Roth, in Bavaria, Germany. It is situated 10 km southeast of Roth bei Nürnberg and 30 km south of Nuremberg, close to the lake 'Rothsee.

== History ==
- Origins of the castle and the town date back to the 10th century.
- Town privileges were granted in 1354.
- 1799, Hilpoltstein becomes part of Bavaria

== Sights ==
- Rathaus (Town Hall)
- Accessible Tower of the Remains of the early medieval Castle
- Remains of The Town Wall
- Church of Saint John the Baptist (Town's Parish Church)
- Jahrsdorfer House
- Guest House 'Schwarzes Ross' with historic Brewery and museum on handcrafts and town history

== Sons and daughters of the place ==
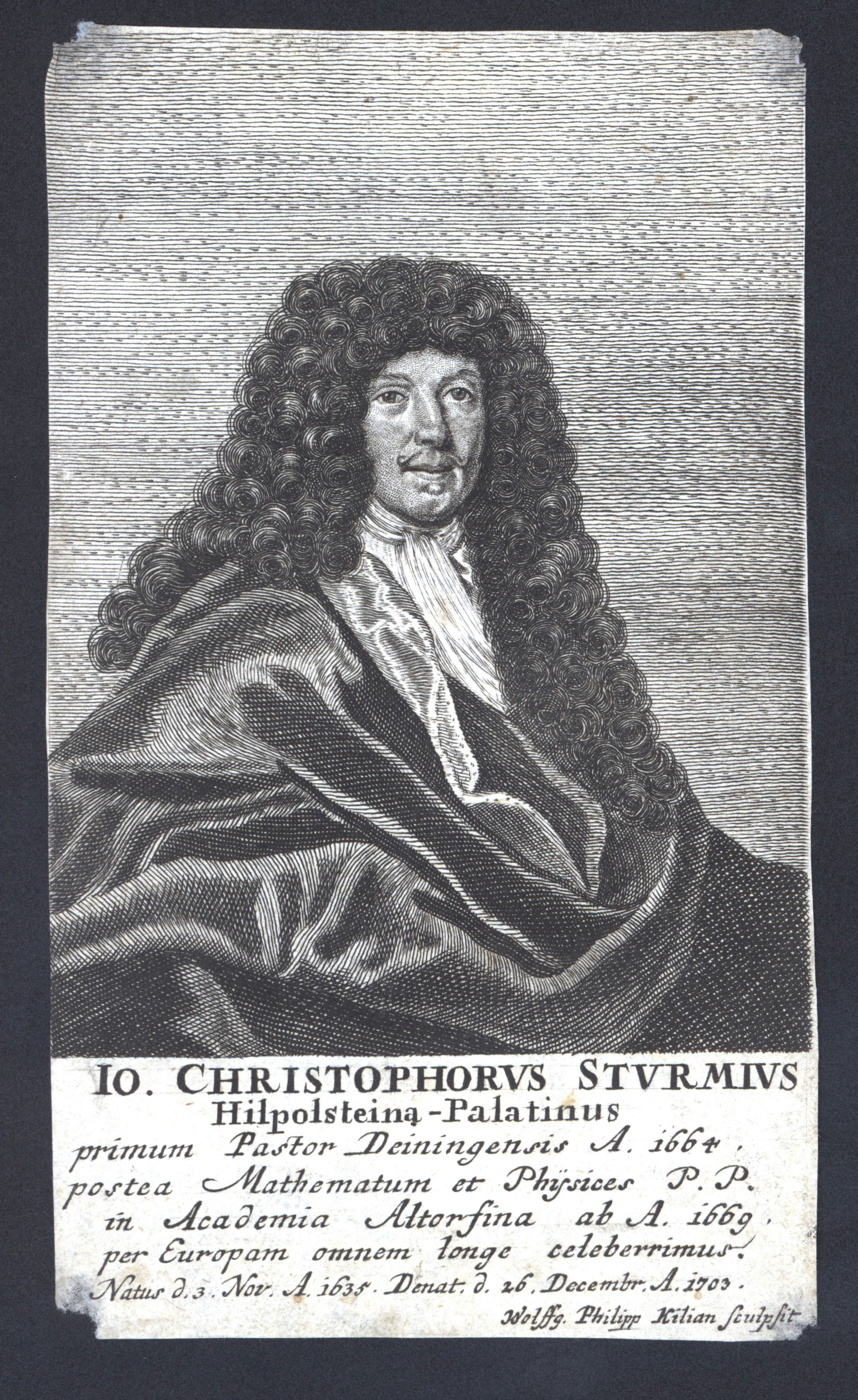
Johann Christoph Sturm

- Johann Christoph Sturm (1635–1703), astronomer and mathematician
- Friedrich Eibner (1825–1877), painter

== People who work or have worked on the ground ==
- Ludwig Elsbett (1913–2003), engineer and inventor of the Elsbett engine

== Annual Events ==
- Spring Concert of the town's brass band (April)
- Medieval festival with knights tournament (May)
- Challenge Roth: World's largest long-distance triathlon (July)
- Burgfest - Popular folk fair with medieval pageant, flea market in the old town, beer tent, fireworks (1st weekend of August)
- Kite festival (last weekend of September)
- Christmas Market (1st weekend of the Advent)
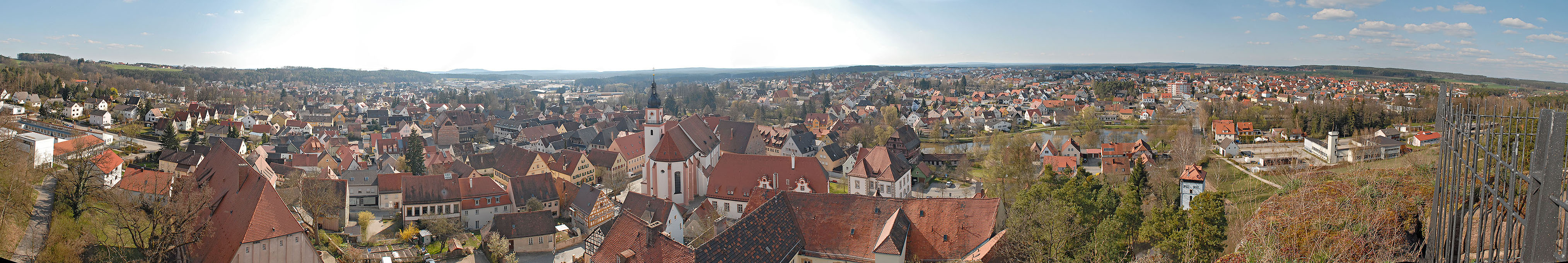
Panorama view of Hilpoltstein

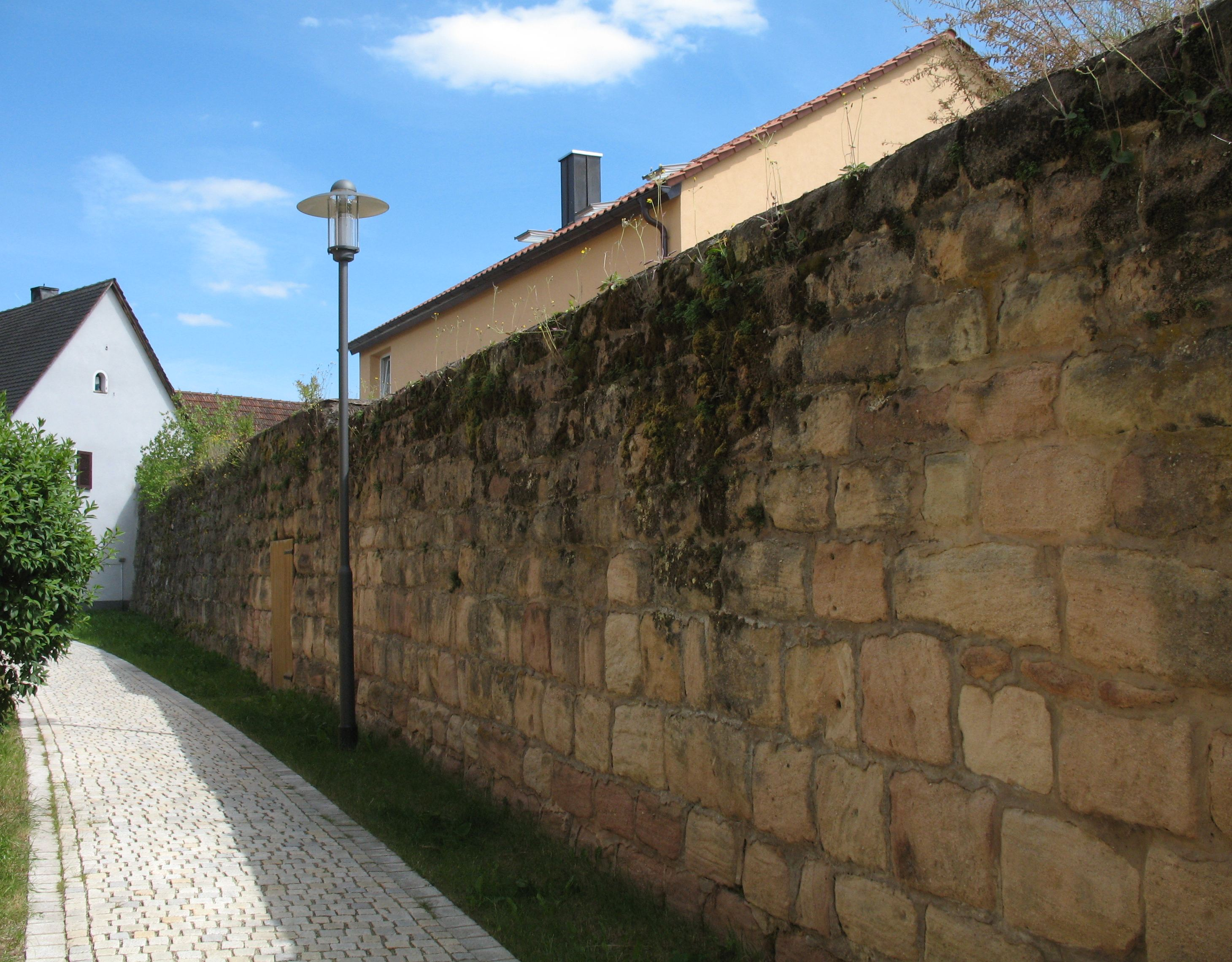
City wall

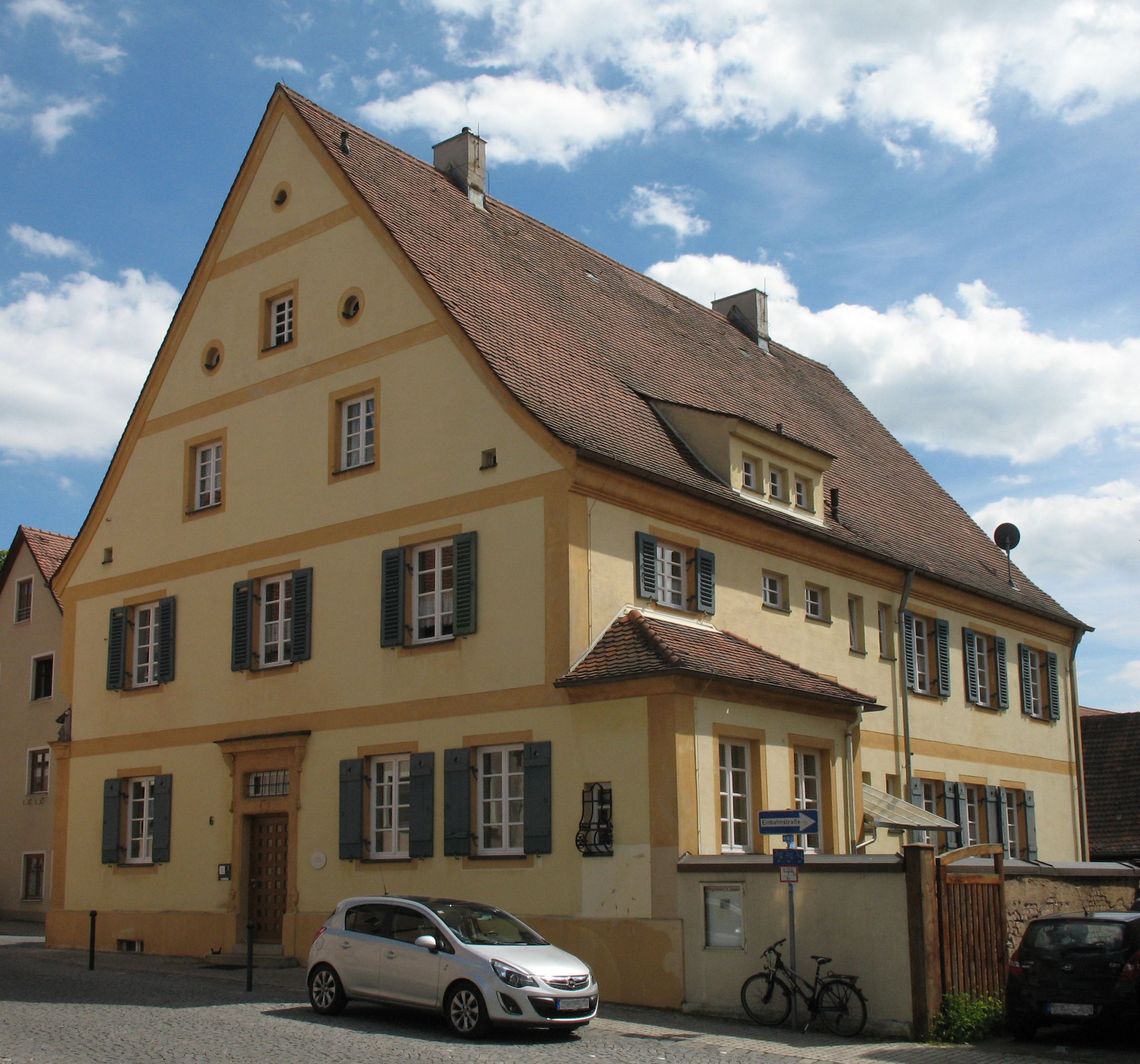

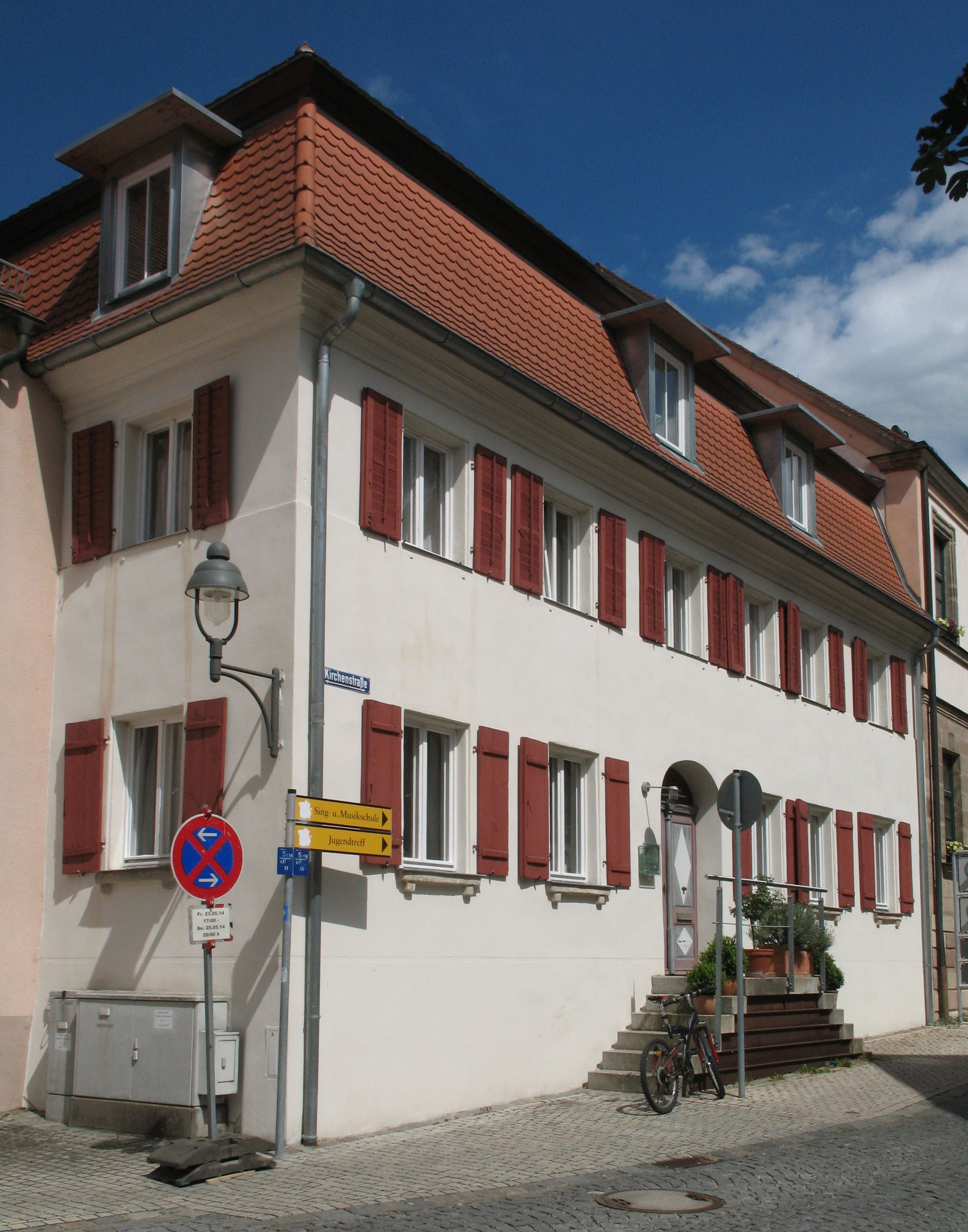

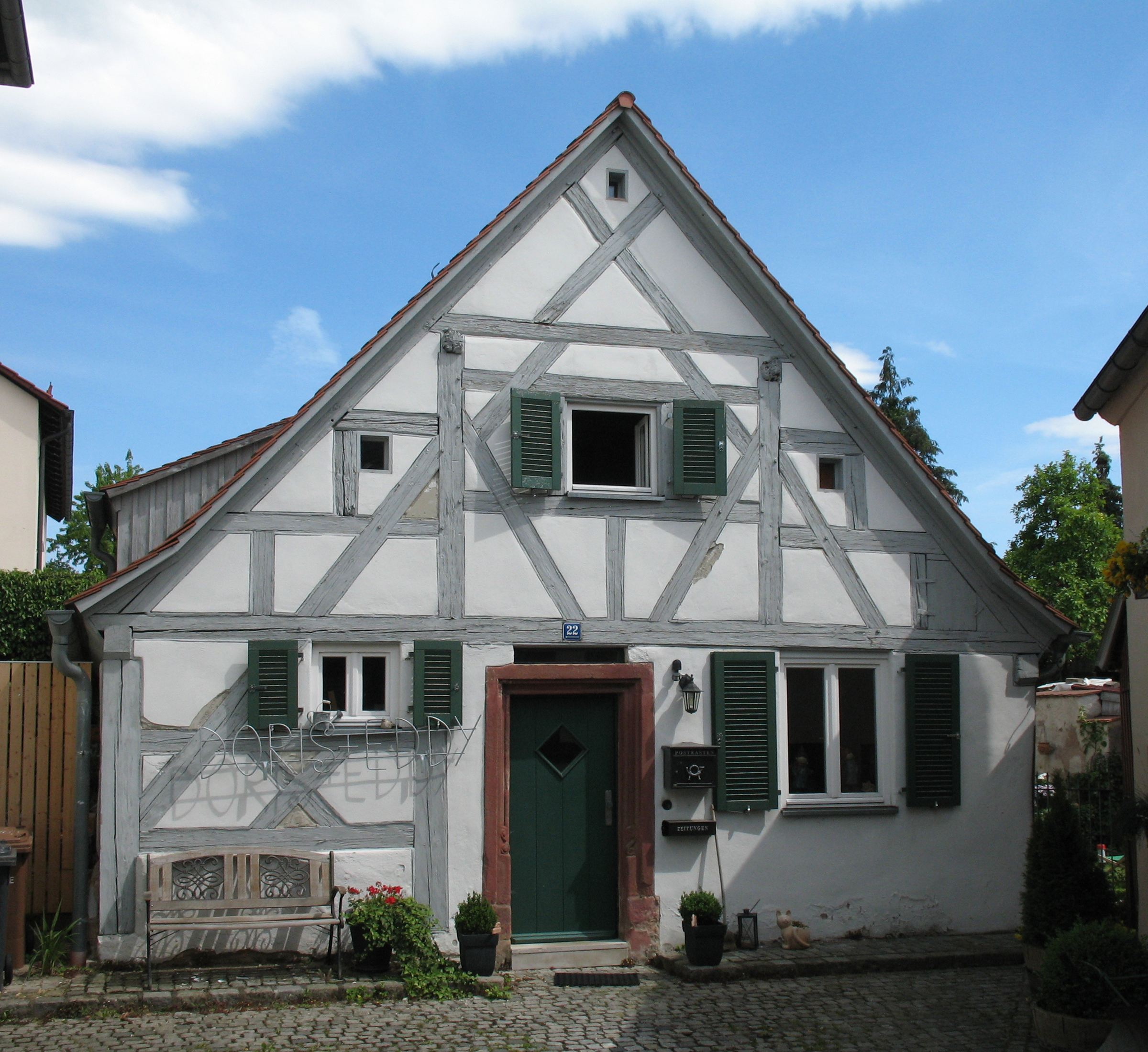

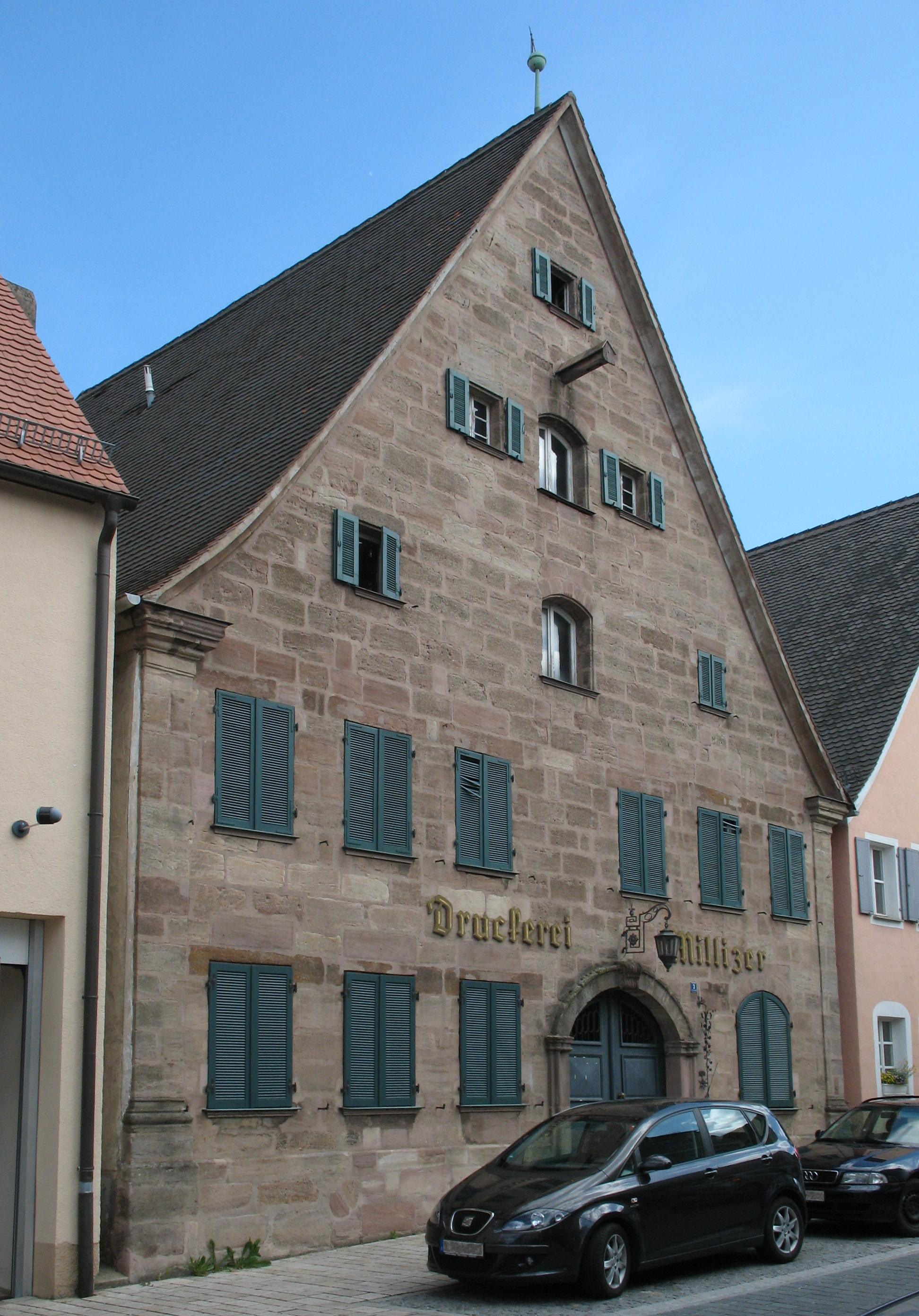

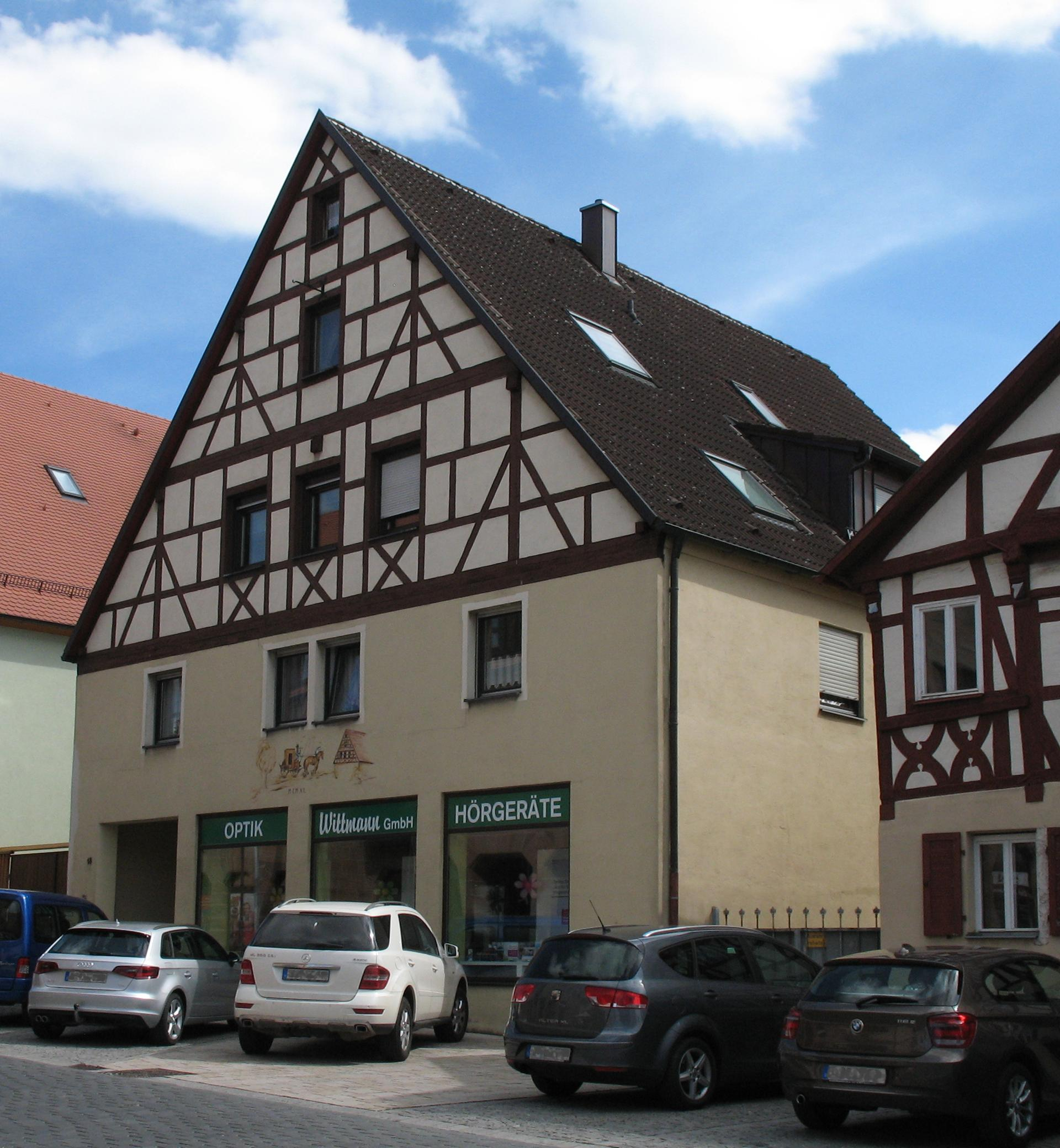

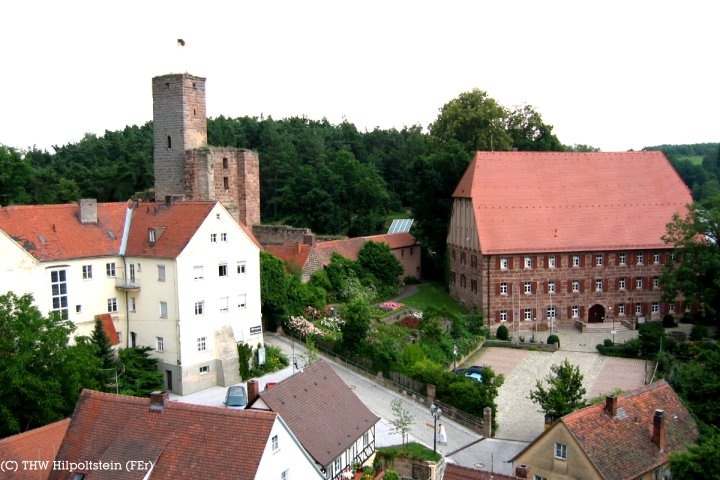
Castle Remains
