= Friedrich Eibner =

German painter (1826–1877)

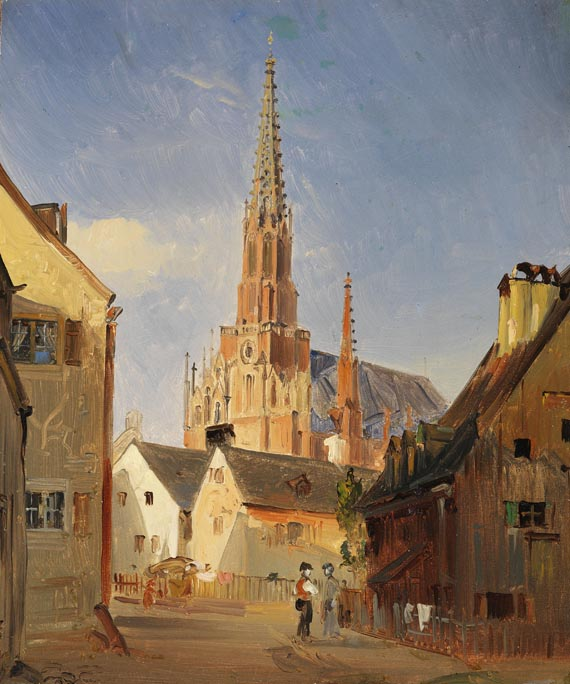
Mariahilfkirche in Munich

Friedrich Eibner (1826–1877) was a German painter of architectural subjects. He was born in 1826, at Hilpoltstein in Bavaria, Weimar Republic (now Germany). Eibner studied after the works of Heinrich Schönfeld; he travelled in Bavaria, and afterwards in Germany, France, Upper Italy, and Spain, making a large number of water-colour drawings of the places he visited. The Album for the Prince Metschersky, with whom he travelled in Spain in 1860–61, may be considered his best work. He died at Munich in 1877. His son was Alexander Eibner, a noted chemist and painter.

== See also ==
- List of German painters
