= Alexander Eibner =

German painter, and chemist (1862–1935)

- Born: Alexander Paul Friedrich Eibner; September 11, 1862; Munich, German Empire (now Germany)
- Died: May 1, 1935 (aged 72); Munich, Germany
- Burial place: Alter Südfriedhof
- Education: Technical University of Munich (PhD)
- Occupations: Painter, chemist, educator
- Spouse: Martha Rosenberger (m. 1906–)
- Father: Friedrich Eibner

Alexander Paul Friedrich Eibner (1862–1935) was a German chemist, painter, and educator. He was known for his technical painting techniques.

== Early life and education ==
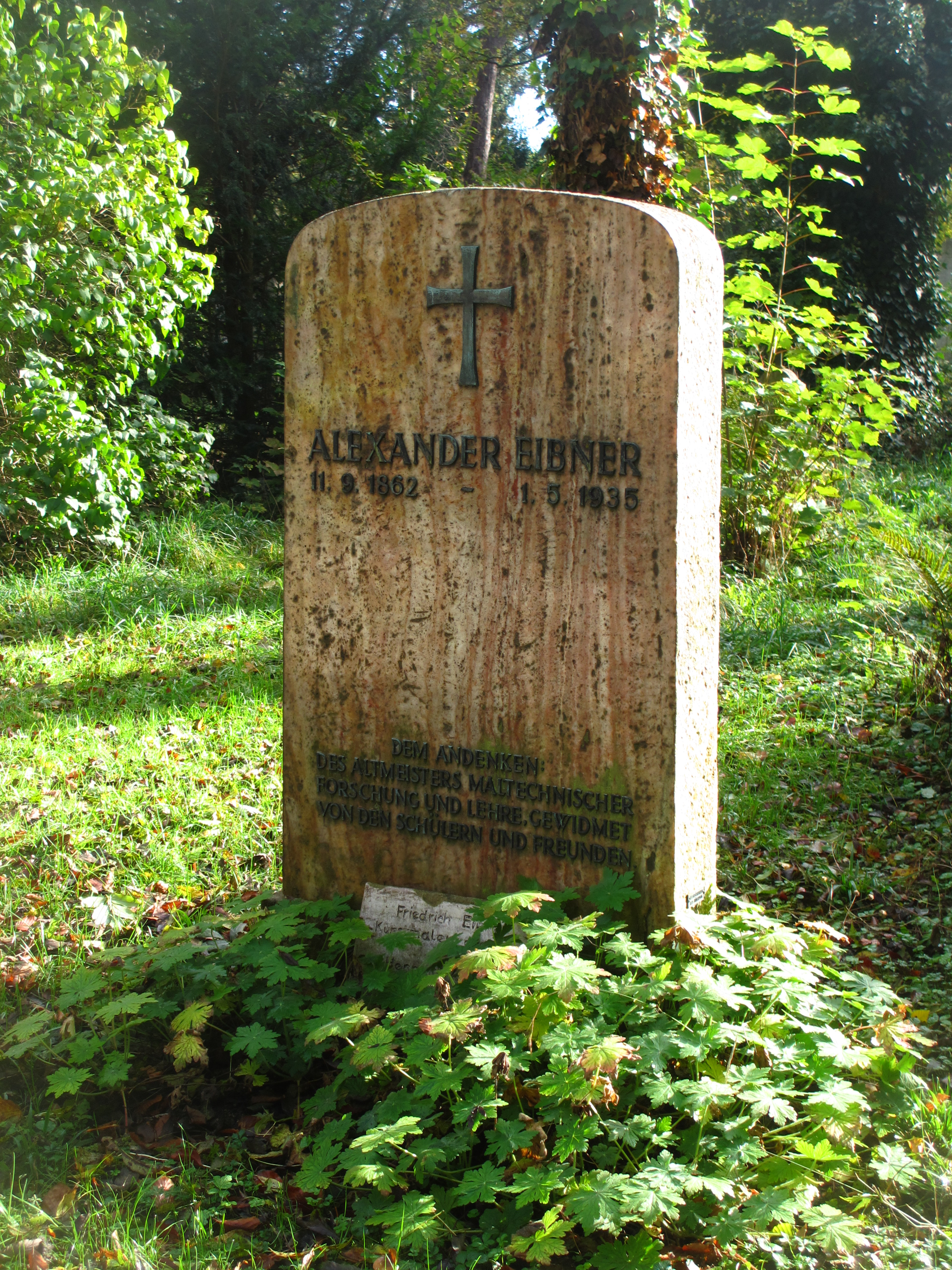
Grave of Eibner at Alter Südfriedhof

Alexander Eibner, was born on September 11, 1862, in Munich. He was the son of Luise Weissenberger, and painter Friedrich Eibner. Eibner studied chemistry at the Technical University of Munich, under Wilhelm von Miller and he obtained a doctorate degree in 1892.

== Career ==
By 1894, he qualified as a professor, and began researching aromaticity in organic chemistry. He studied the bleaching of pigment of Prussian Blue using zinc oxide. Through that research he introduced the concept of photocatalysis in 1911.

In 1903, Eibner became assistant to chemist Gustav Schultz at the newly founded Research Institute and Information Center for Painting Techniques, promoting the scientific study of the nature and the properties of painting materials. Starting in 1907, Eibner lead the Research Institute and Information Center for Painting Techniques, which closed after his death.

He died on May 1, 1935, in Munich. He is buried at Alter Südfriedhof cemetery, near his father.
