= Heidelberg Castle =

Ruin in Heidelberg, Baden-Württemberg, Germany

- Heidelberger Schloss
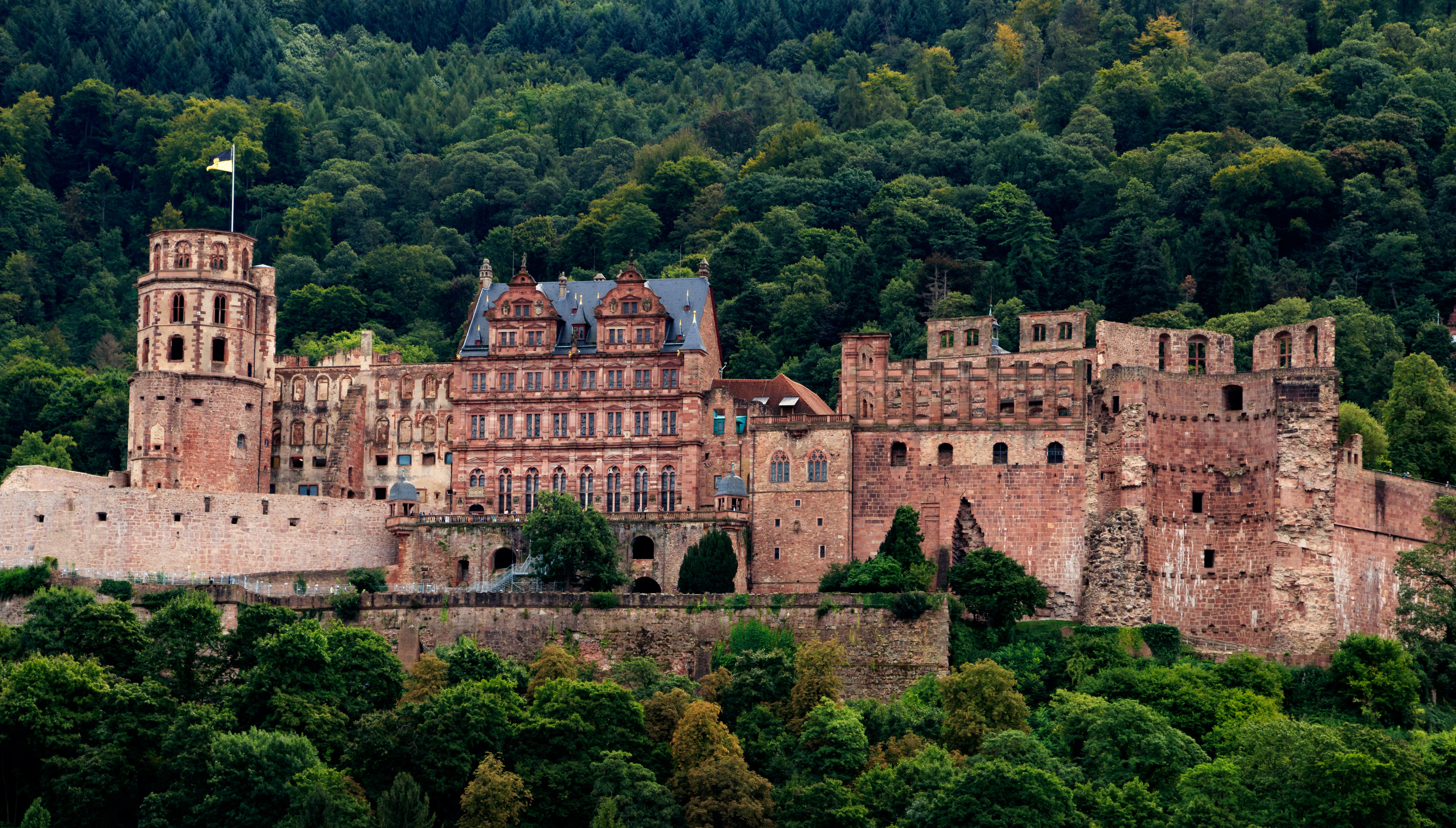

General information
- Architectural style: Gothic & Renaissance
- Location: Heidelberg, Germany
- Construction started: before 1214
- Owner: Bishop of Worms (first known owner); State of Baden-Württemberg

Website
- www.schloss-heidelberg.de

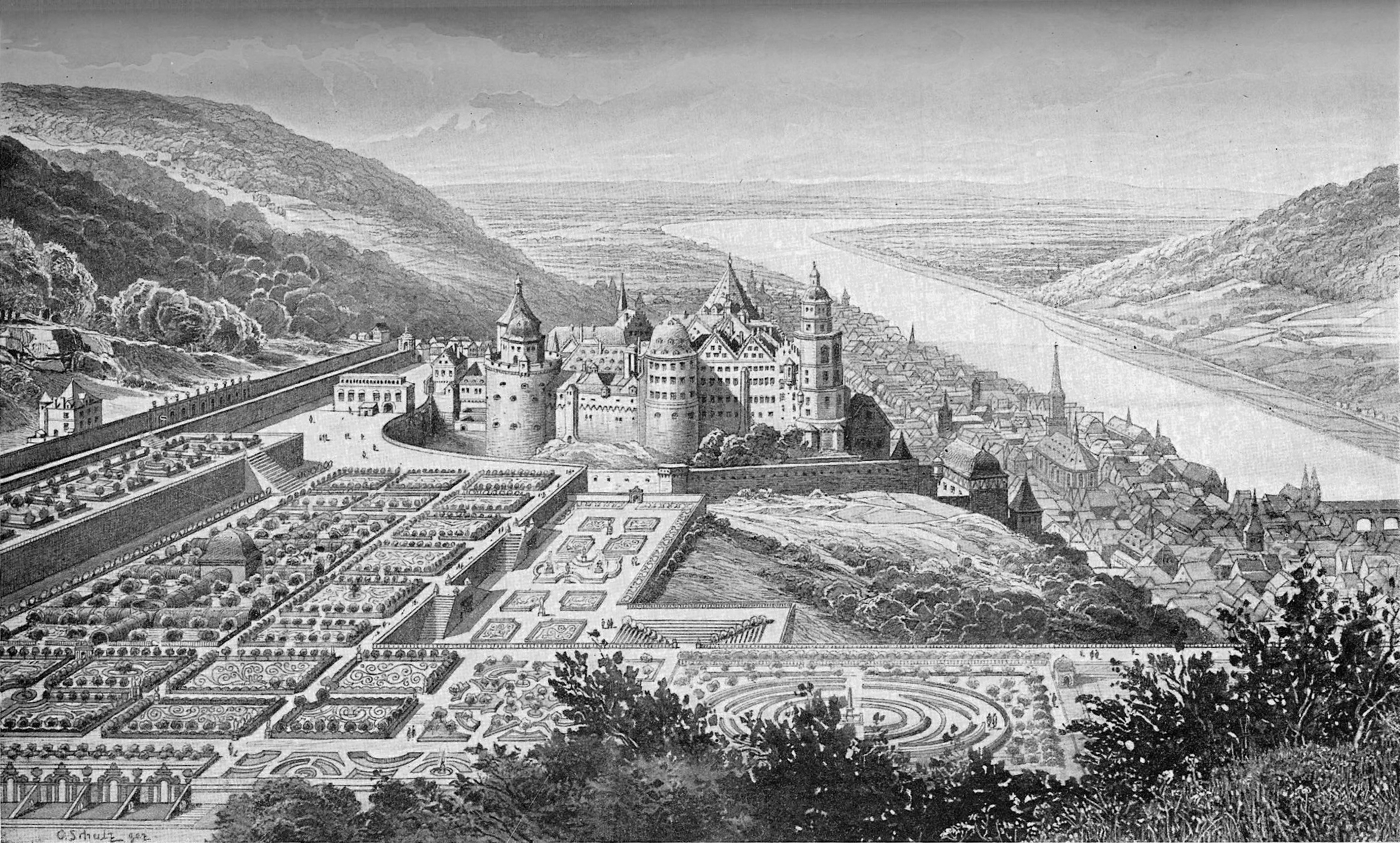
Heidelberg Castle in 1620

Heidelberg Castle (German: Heidelberger Schloss) is a ruin in Germany and landmark of Heidelberg. The castle ruins are among the most important Renaissance structures north of the Alps.

The castle has only been partially rebuilt since its demolition in the 17th and 18th centuries. It is located 80 metres (260 ft) up the northern part of the Königstuhl hillside, and thereby dominates the view of the old downtown. It is served by an intermediate station on the Heidelberger Bergbahn funicular railway that runs from Heidelberg's Kornmarkt to the summit of the Königstuhl.

The earliest castle structure was built before 1214 and later expanded into two castles circa 1294; however, in 1537, a lightning bolt destroyed the upper castle. The present structures had been expanded by 1650, before damage by later wars and fires. In 1764, another lightning bolt caused a fire which destroyed some rebuilt sections. By 1880, Mark Twain mentioned it as a ruin.

== History ==
=== Before destruction ===
==== Early history ====
Heidelberg was first mentioned in 1196 as "Heidelberch". In 1155 Conrad of Hohenstaufen was made the Count Palatine by his half-brother Frederick Barbarossa, and the region became known as the Electoral Palatinate. The claim that Conrad's main residence was on the Schlossberg (Castle Hill), known as the Jettenbühl, cannot be substantiated. The name "Jettenbühl" comes from the soothsayer Jetta, who was said to have lived there. She is also associated with Wolfsbrunnen (Wolf's Spring) and the Heidenloch (Heathens' Well). The first mention of a castle in Heidelberg (Latin: "castrum in Heidelberg cum burgo ipsius castri") is in 1214, when Louis I, Duke of Bavaria of the House of Wittelsbach received it from Hohenstaufen Emperor Friedrich II. The last mention of a single castle is in 1294. In another document from 1303, two castles are mentioned for the first time:

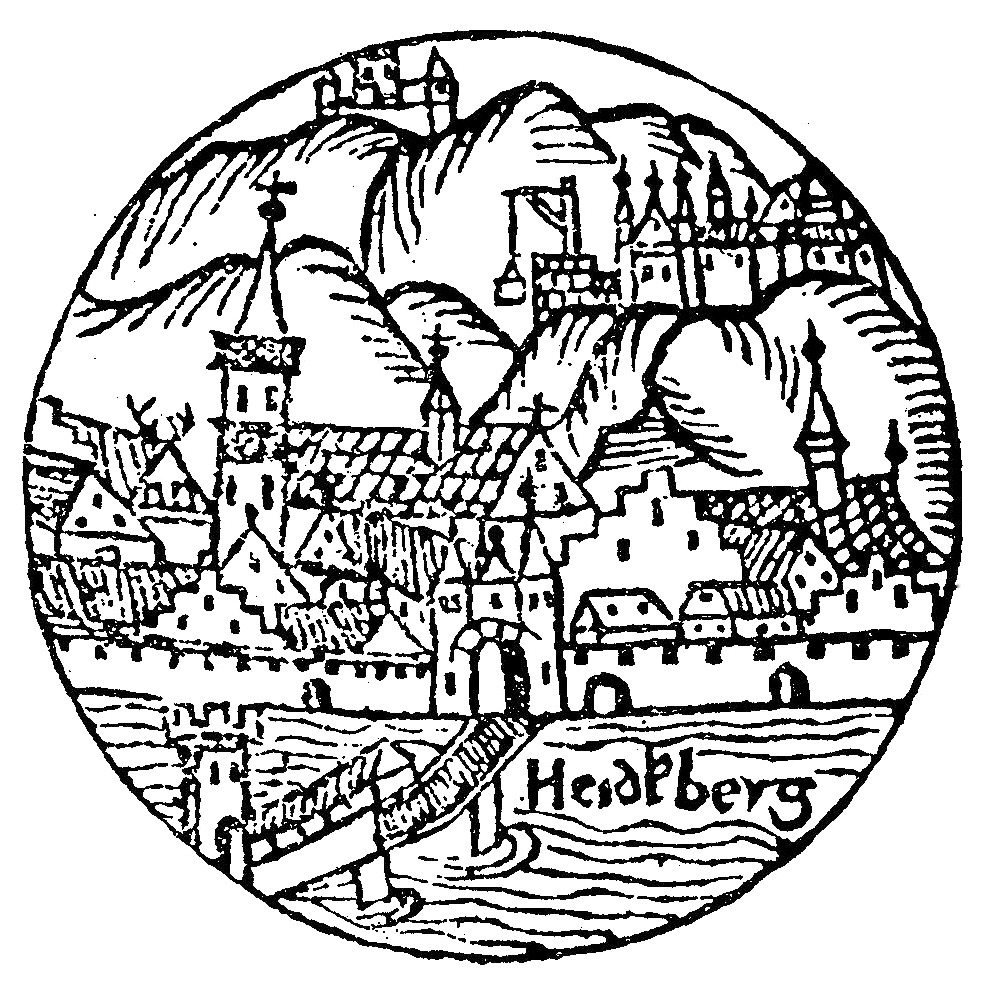
The earliest known depiction of the castle, from Sebastian Münster's Kalendarium Hebraicum published in 1527 (detail)

- The upper castle on Kleiner Gaisberg Mountain, near today's Hotel Molkenkur (destroyed in 1537);
- The lower castle on the Jettenbühl (the present castle site).

All that is known about the founding of the lower castle is that it took place sometime between 1294 and 1303. The oldest documented references to Heidelberg Castle are found during the 1600s:

- The Thesaurus Pictuarum of the Palatinate church counsel Markus zum Lamb (1559 to 1606);
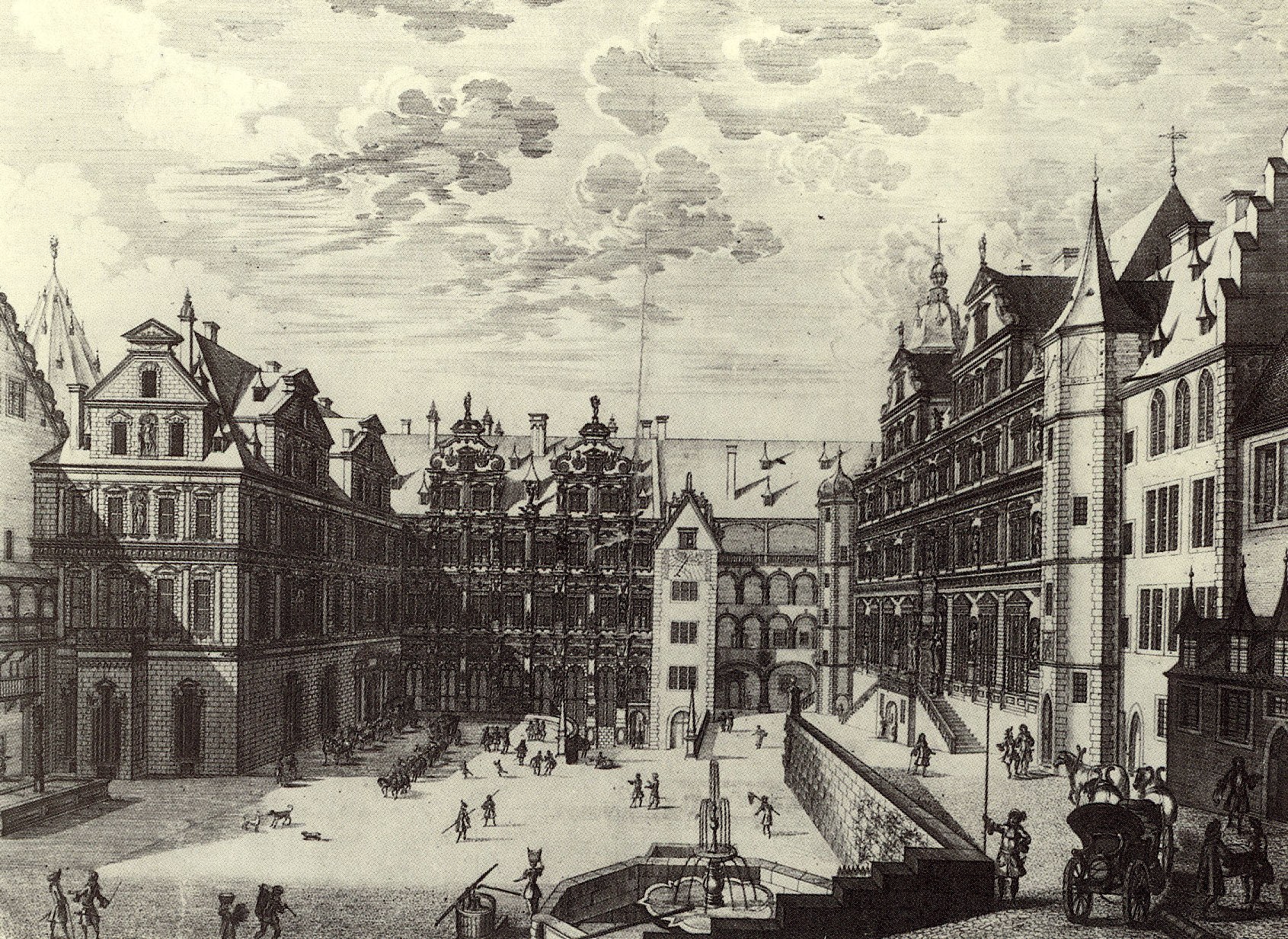
- Heidelberg Castle courtyard around 1683, Johann Ulrich Kraus
  The "Annales Academici Heidelbergenses" by the Heidelberg librarian and professor Pithopoeus (started in 1587);
- The "Originum Palatinarum Commentarius" by Marquard Freher (1599);
- The "Teutsche Reyssebuch" by Martin Zeiller (Strasbourg 1632, reprinted in 1674 as the "Itinerarium Germaniae").

All of these works are for the most part superficial and do not contain much information. In 1615, Merian's Topographia Palatinatus Rheni described Prince Elector Ludwig V as he "started building a new castle one hundred and more years ago". Most of the descriptions of the castle up until the 18th century are based on Merian's information. Under Ruprecht I, the court chapel was erected on the Jettenbühl.

==== Palace of kings ====
When Ruprecht became the King of Germany in 1401, the castle was so small that on his return from his coronation, he had to camp out in the Augustinians' monastery, on the site of today's University Square. What he desired was more space for his entourage and court and to impress his guests, but also additional defences to turn the castle into a fortress.

After Ruprecht's death in 1410, his land was divided between his four sons. The Palatinate, the heart of his territories, was given to the eldest son, Ludwig III. Ludwig was the representative of the emperor and the supreme judge, and it was in this capacity that he, after the Council of Constance in 1415 and at the behest of Emperor Sigismund, held the deposed Antipope John XXIII in custody before he was taken to Burg Eichelsheim (today Mannheim-Lindenhof).

On a visit to Heidelberg in 1838, the French author Victor Hugo took particular pleasure in strolling among the ruins of the castle. He summarised its history in this letter:

But let me talk of its castle. (This is absolutely essential, and I should actually have begun with it.) What times it has been through! Five hundred years long it has been victim to everything that has shaken Europe, and now it has collapsed under its weight. That is because this Heidelberg Castle, the residence of the counts Palatine, who were answerable only to kings, emperors, and popes, and was of too much significance to bend to their whims, but couldn't raise his head without coming into conflict with them, and that is because, in my opinion, that the Heidelberg Castle has always taken up some position of opposition towards the powerful. Circa 1300, the time of its founding, it starts with a Thebes analogy; in Count Rudolf and Emperor Ludwig, these degenerate brothers, it has its Eteocles and its Polynices [warring sons of Oedipus]. Then the prince elector begins to grow in power. In 1400 the Palatine Ruprecht II, supported by three Rhenish prince electors, deposes Emperor Wenceslaus and usurps his position; 120 years later in 1519, Count Palatine Frederick II was to create the young King Charles I of Spain Emperor Charles V.

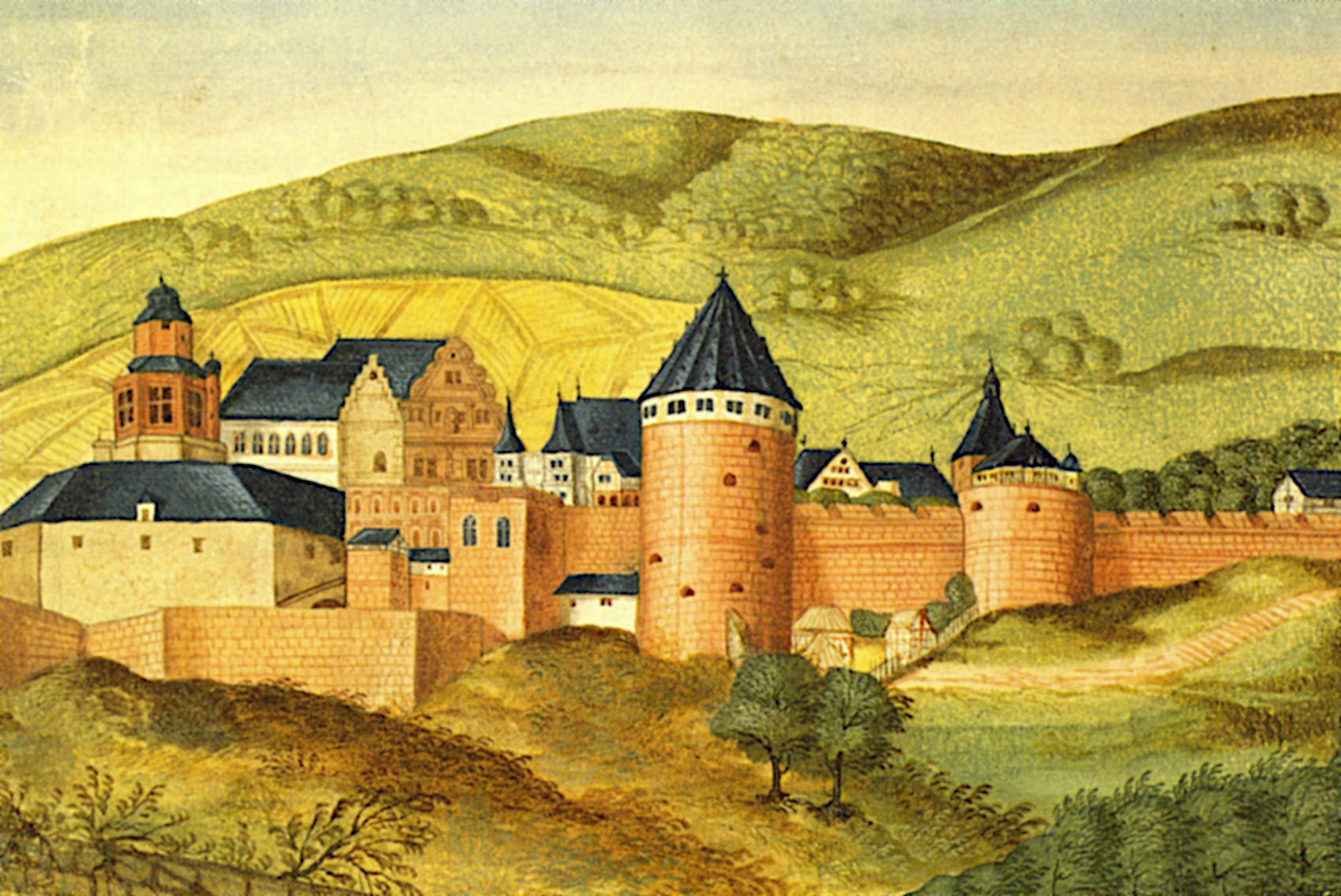
The castle as it appears in the Thesaurus Pictuarum, circa 16th century

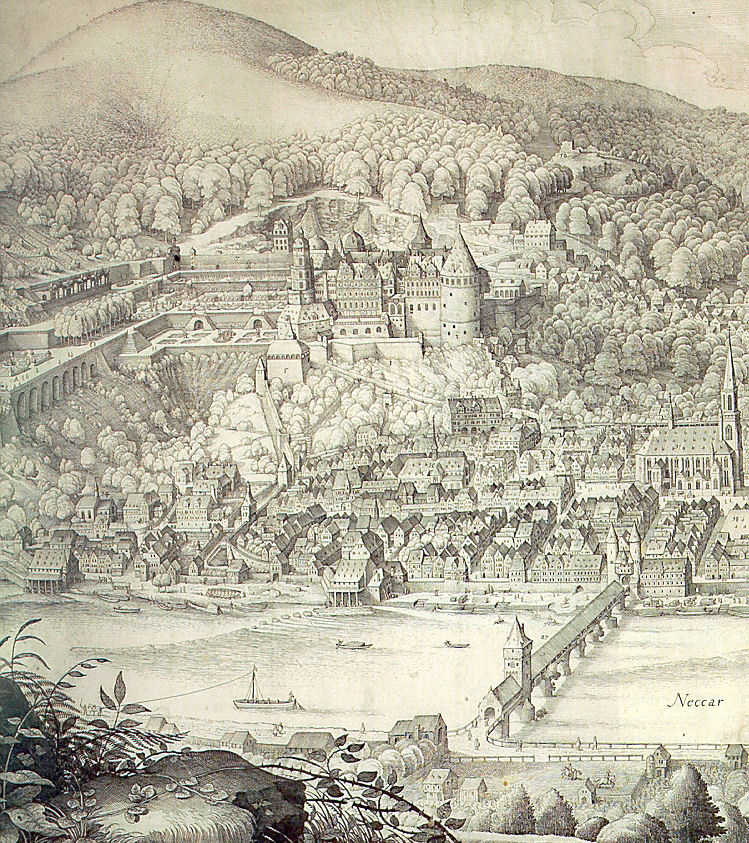
The castle and town, by Matthäus Merian

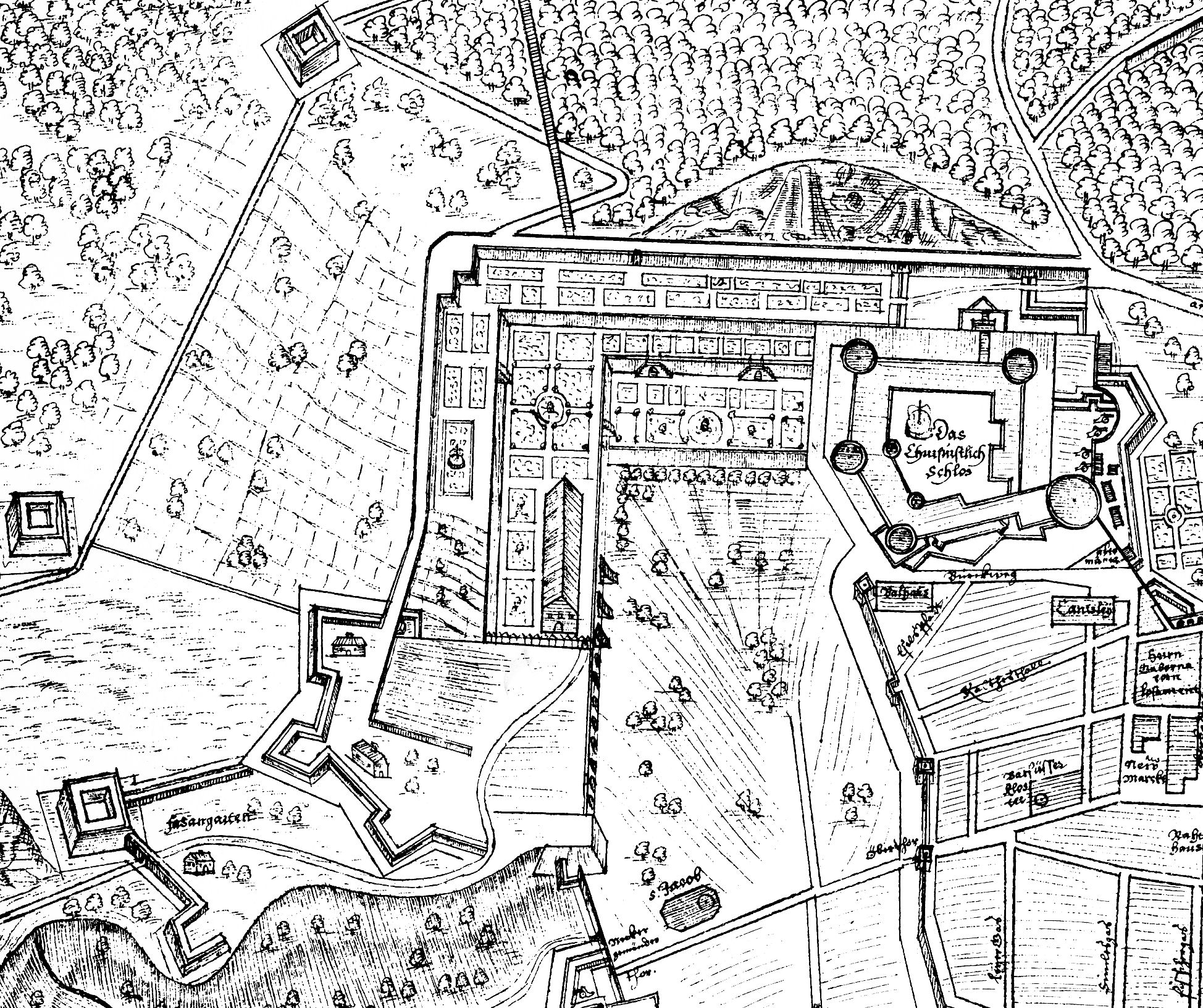
Plan of the Castle and its Defenses from 1622

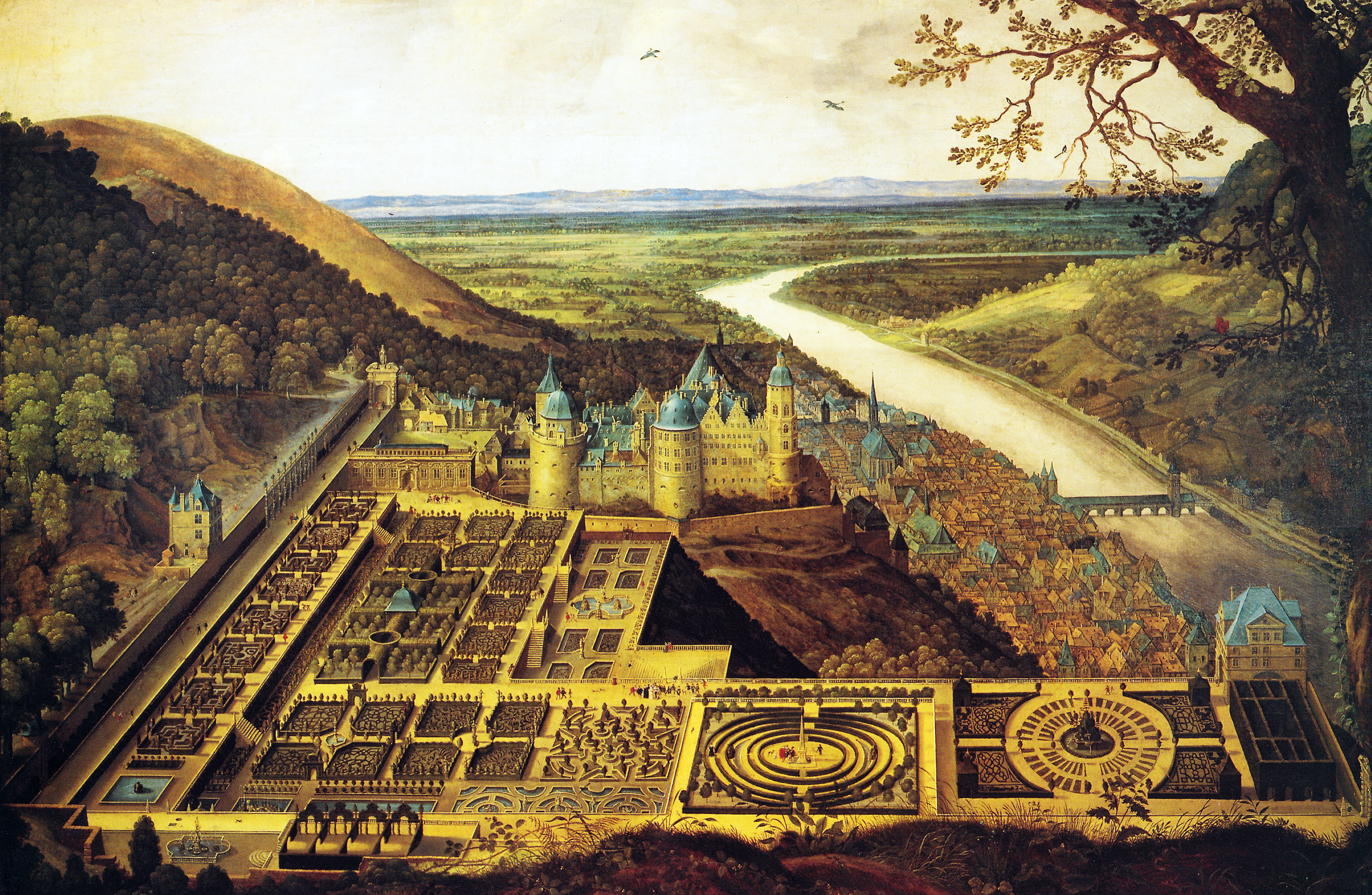
Castle with the Hortus Palatinus, circa 1650

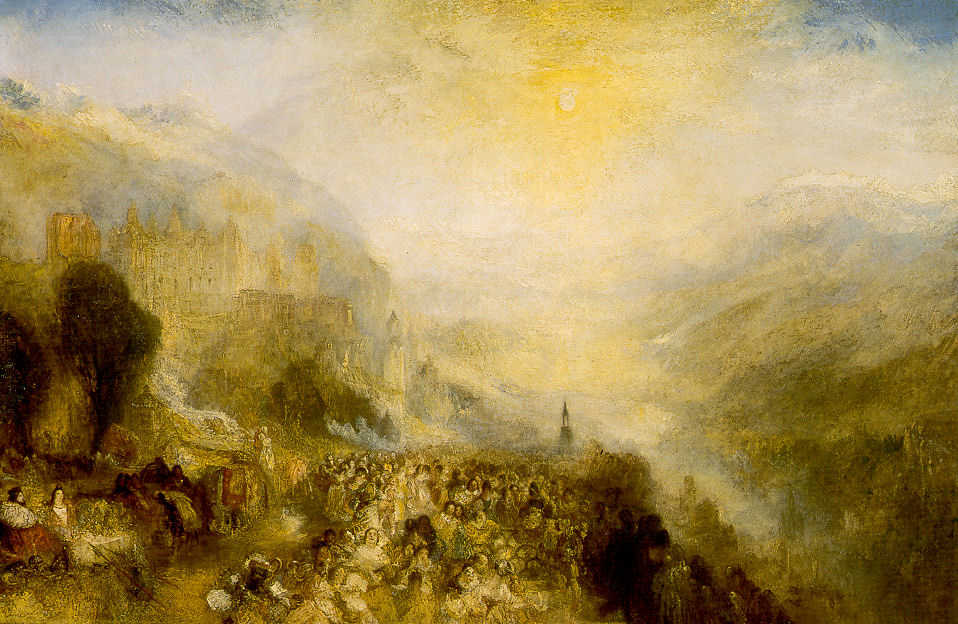
Romantic painting by J. M. W. Turner depicting the castle

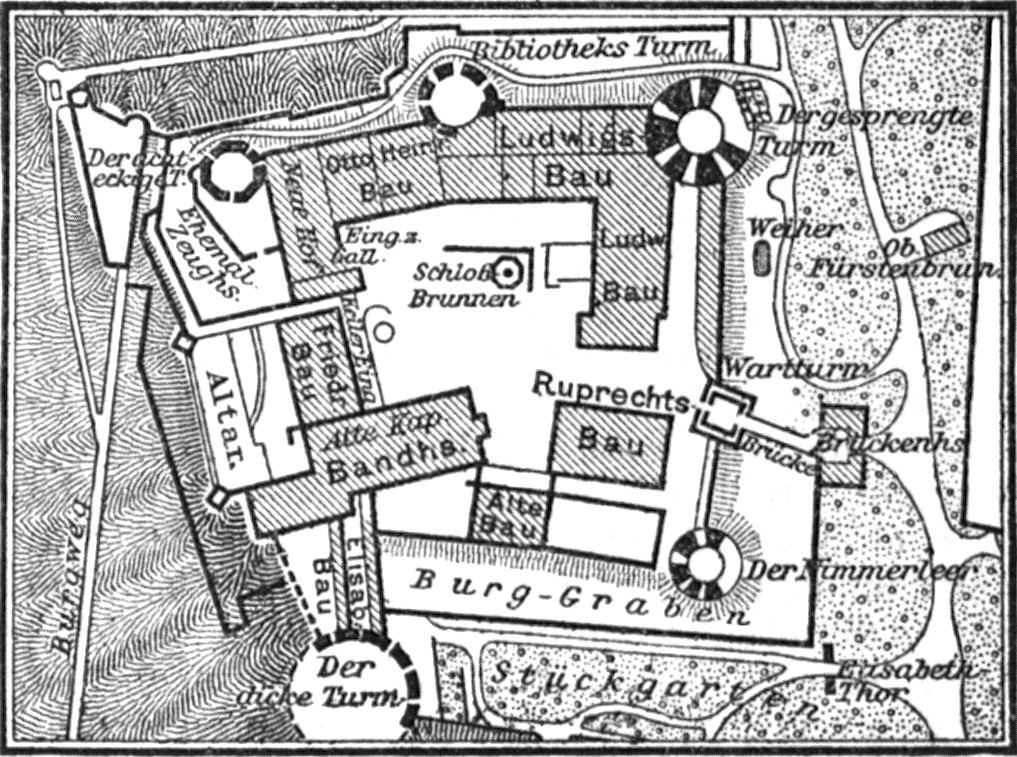
Castle floor plan, 1890

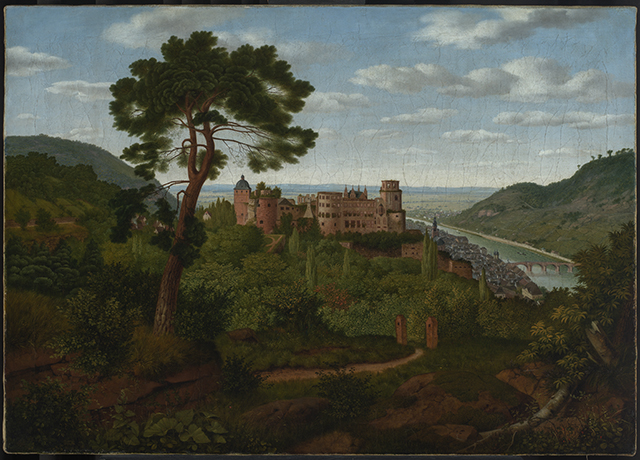
Christian Philipp Köster - Blick auf Heidelberg und das Heidelberger Schloss - 1438 - Staatliche Kunsthalle Karlsruhe

==== Reformation and the Thirty Years Wars ====
It was during the reign of Louis V, Elector Palatine (1508–1544) that Martin Luther came to Heidelberg to defend one of his theses (Heidelberg Disputation) and paid a visit to the castle. He was shown around by Louis's younger brother, Wolfgang, Count Palatine, and in a letter to his friend George Spalatin praises the castle's beauty and its defenses.

In 1619, Bohemian Protestant estates rebelling against the Emperor offered the crown of Bohemia to Frederick V, Elector Palatine who accepted despite misgivings and in doing so triggered the outbreak of the Thirty Years War. It was during the Thirty Years War that arms were raised against the castle for the first time. This period marks the end of the castle's construction; the centuries to follow brought with them destruction and rebuilding.

Historic etching from the "Philosopher's Walk" (Philosophenweg) towards the Old Town area of Heidelberg. Visible in the background are the Heidelberg Castle, Heiliggeist Church, and the Old Bridge.

=== Destruction ===
After his defeat at the Battle of White Mountain on 8 November 1620, Frederick V was on the run as an outlaw and had to release his troops prematurely, leaving the Palatinate undefended against General Tilly, the supreme commander of the Imperial and Catholic League troops. On 26 August 1622, Tilly commenced his attack on Heidelberg, taking the town on 16 September, and the castle a few days later.

When the Swedes captured Heidelberg on 5 May 1633 and opened fire on the castle from the Königstuhl hill behind it, the commander of the Catholic League garrison handed over the castle. The following year, the emperor's troops tried to recapture the castle, but it was not until July 1635 that they succeeded. It remained in their possession until the Peace of Westphalia ending the Thirty Years War was signed. The new ruler, Charles Louis (Karl Ludwig) and his family did not move into the ruined castle until 7 October 1649.

Victor Hugo summarized these and the following events:

In 1619, Frederick V, then a young man, seized the crown of the kings of Bohemia, against the will of the emperor, and in 1687, Philip William, Count Palatine, by then an old man, assumes the title of prince-elector, against the will of the king of France. This was to cause Heidelberg battles and never-ending tribuluations, the Thirty Years War, Gustav Adolfs Ruhmesblatt and finally the War of the Grand Alliance, the Turennes mission. All of these terrible events have blighted the castle. Three emperors, Louis the Bavarian, Adolf of Nassau, and Leopold of Austria, have laid siege to it; Pio II condemned it; Louis XIV wreaked havoc on it.

— quoted from Victor Hugo: "Heidelberg"

==== Nine Years' War ====
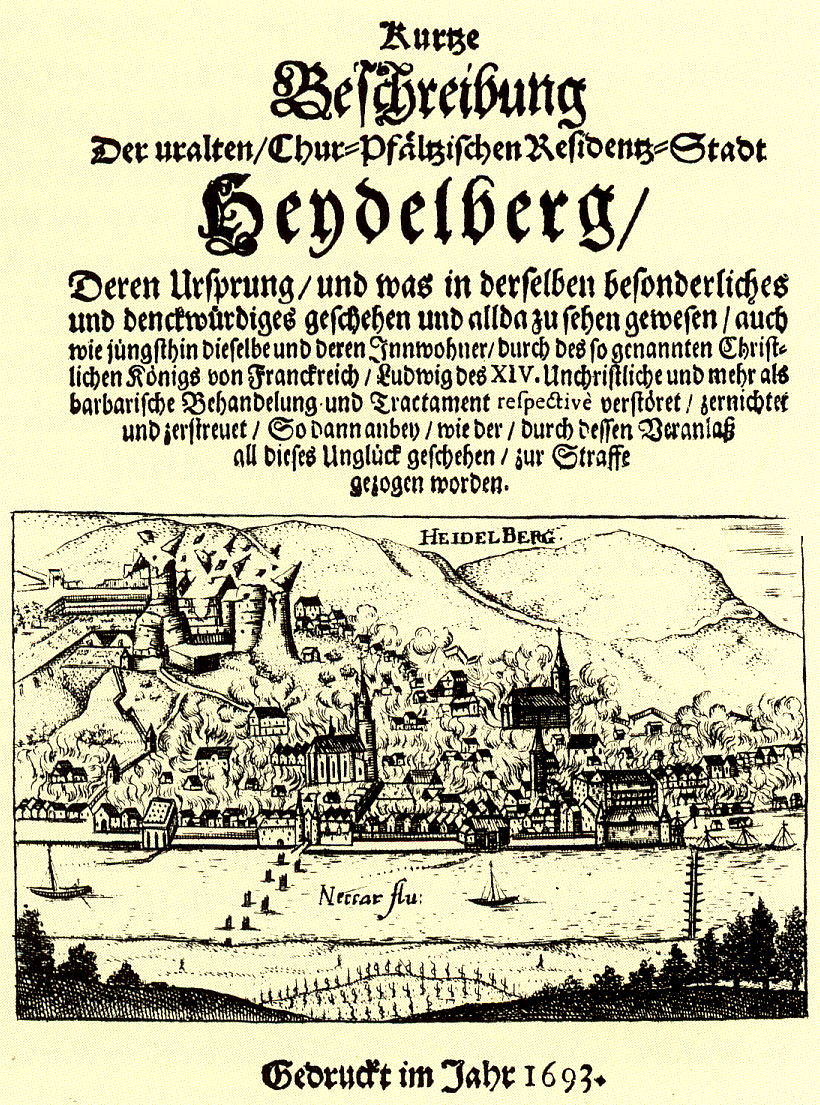
Pamphlet on the Destruction of the Castle, 1693

After the death of Charles II, Elector Palatine, the last in line of the House of Palatinate-Simmern, Louis XIV of France demanded the surrender of the allodial title in favor of the Duchess of Orléans, Elizabeth Charlotte, Princess Palatine who he claimed was the rightful heir to the Simmern lands. On 29 September 1688, the French troops marched into the Palatinate of the Rhine and on 24 October moved into Heidelberg, which had been deserted by Philipp Wilhelm, the new Elector Palatine from the line of Palatinate-Neuburg. At war against the allied European powers, France's war council decided to destroy all fortifications and to lay waste to the Palatinate (Brûlez le Palatinat!), in order to prevent an enemy attack from this area. As the French withdrew from the castle on 2 March 1689, they set fire to it and blew the front off the Fat Tower. Portions of the town were also burned, but the mercy of a French general, René de Froulay de Tessé, who told the townspeople to set small fires in their homes to create smoke and the illusion of widespread burning, prevented wider destruction.

Immediately upon his accession in 1690, Johann Wilhelm, Elector Palatine had the walls and towers rebuilt. When the French again reached the gates of Heidelberg in 1691 and 1692, the town's defenses were so good that they did not gain entry. On 18 May 1693 the French were yet again at the town's gates and took it on 22 May. However, they did not attain control of the castle and destroyed the town in attempt to weaken the castle's main support base. The castle's occupants capitulated the next day. Now the French took the opportunity to finish off the work started in 1689, after their hurried exit from the town. The towers and walls that had survived the last wave of destruction, were blown up with mines.

==== Removal of the court to Mannheim ====
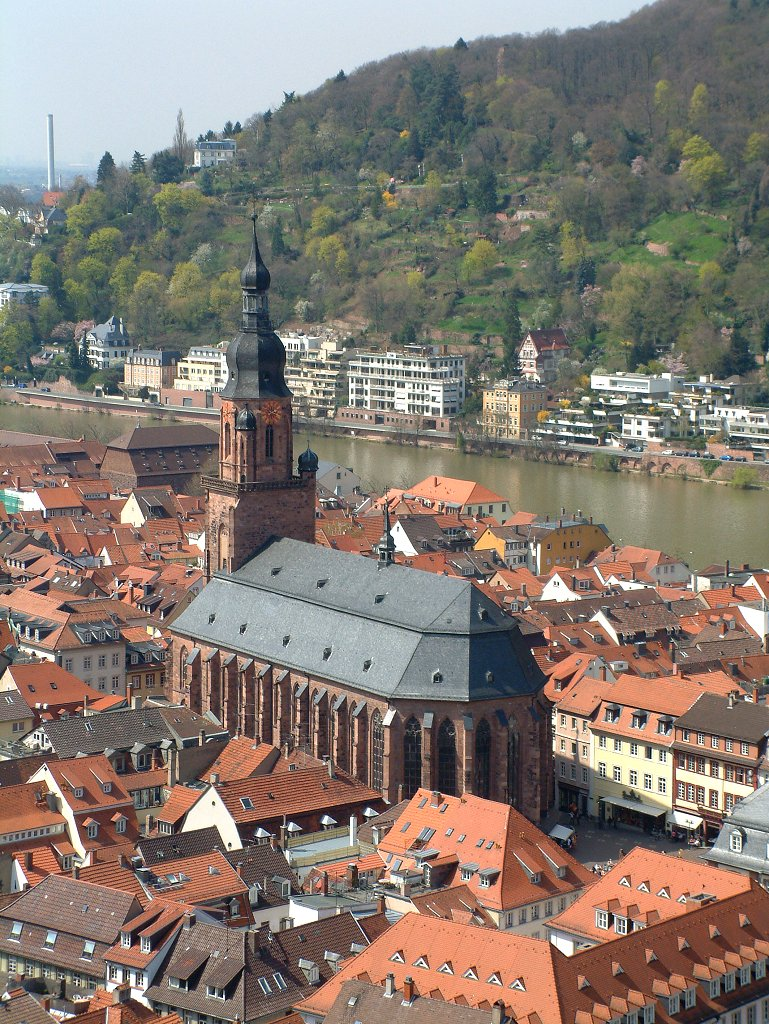
Church of the Holy Spirit served two congregations (Protestant and Catholic) for a time and was the reason why the court removed to Mannheim.

In 1697 the Treaty of Ryswick was signed, marking the end of the War of the Grand Alliance and finally bringing peace to the town. Plans were made to pull down the castle and to reuse parts of it for a new palace in the valley. When difficulties with this plan became apparent, the castle was patched up. At the same time, Charles III Philip, Elector Palatine played with the idea of completely redesigning the castle, but shelved the project due to lack of funds. He did, however, famously install Perkeo of Heidelberg, his favorite court jester, to watch over the castle's wine stock. Perkeo later became the unofficial mascot of the city. In 1720, Charles came into conflict with the town's Protestants as a result of fully handing over the Church of the Holy Spirit to the Catholics (it had previously been split by a partition and used by both congregations), the Catholic prince-elector moved his court to Mannheim and lost all interest in the castle. When on 12 April 1720, Charles announced the removal of the court and all its administrative bodies to Mannheim, he wished that "Grass may grow on her streets".

The religious conflict was probably only one reason for the move to Mannheim. In addition, converting the old-fashioned hill-top castle into a Baroque palace would have been difficult and costly. By moving down into the plain, the prince-elector was able to construct a new palace, Mannheim Palace, that met his every wish.

Karl Phillip's successor Karl Theodor planned to move his court back to Heidelberg Castle. However, on 24 June 1764, lightning struck the Saalbau (court building) twice in a row, again setting the castle on fire, which he regarded as a sign from heaven and changed his plans. Victor Hugo, who had come to love the ruins of the castle, also saw it as a divine signal:

One could even say that the very heavens had intervened. On 23 June 1764, the day before Karl Theodor was to move into the castle and make it his seat (which, by the bye, would have been a great disaster, for if Karl Theodor had spent his thirty years there, these austere ruins which we today so admire would certainly have been decorated in the pompadour style); on this day, then, with the prince's furnishings already arrived and waiting in the Church of the Holy Spirit, fire from heaven hit the octagonal tower, set light to the roof, and destroyed this five-hundred-year-old castle in very few hours.

— Victor Hugo, Heidelberg

In the following decades, basic repairs were made, but Heidelberg Castle remained essentially a ruin.

=== Since destruction ===
==== Slow decay and Romantic enthusiasm ====
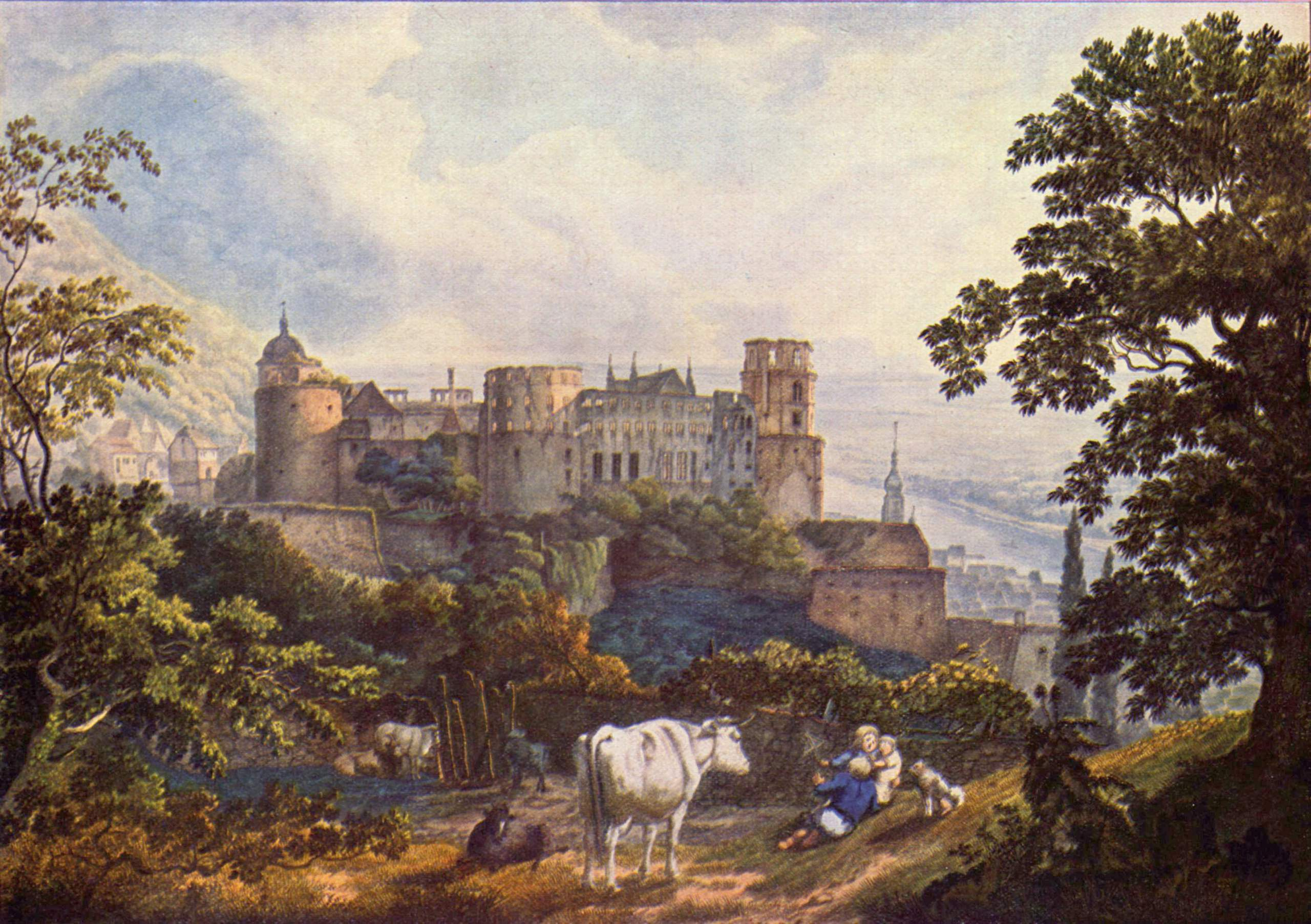
The ruins of the castle as portrayed in an 1815 painting by Karl Philipp Fohr

In 1777, Karl Theodor became ruler of Bavaria in addition to the Palatinate and removed his court from Mannheim to Munich. Heidelberg Castle receded even further from his thoughts and the rooms which still had roofs were taken over by craftsmen. Even as early as 1767, the south wall was quarried for stone to build Schwetzingen Castle. In 1784, the vaults in the Ottoheinrich wing were filled in, and the castle used as a source of building materials.

As a result of the German mediatisation of 1803, Heidelberg and Mannheim became part of Baden. Charles Frederick, Grand Duke of Baden welcomed the addition to his territory, although he regarded Heidelberg Castle as an unwanted addition. The structure was decaying and the townsfolk were helping themselves to stone, wood, and iron from the castle to build their own houses. The statuary and ornaments were also fair game. August von Kotzebue expressed his indignation in 1803 at the government of Baden's intention to pull down the ruins. At the beginning of the nineteenth century, the ruined castle had become a symbol for the patriotic movement against Napoleon.

Even before 1800, artists had come to see the river, the hills and the ruins of the castle as an ideal ensemble. The best depictions are those of England's J. M. W. Turner, who stayed in Heidelberg several times between 1817 and 1844, and painted Heidelberg and the castle many times. He and his fellow Romantic painters were not interested in faithful portrayals of the building and gave artistic licence free rein. For example, Turner's paintings of the castle show it perched far higher up on the hill than it actually is.

The saviour of the castle was the French count Charles de Graimberg. He fought the government of Baden, which viewed the castle as an "old ruin with a multitude of tasteless, crumbling ornaments", for the preservation of the building. Until 1822, he served as a voluntary castle warden, and lived for a while in the Glass Wing (Gläserner Saalbau), where he could keep an eye on the courtyard. Long before the origin of historic preservation in Germany, he was the first person to take an interest in the conservation and documentation of the castle, which may never have occurred to any of the Romantics. Graimberg asked Thomas A. Leger to prepare the first castle guide. With his pictures of the castle, of which many copies were produced, Graimberg promoted the castle ruins and drew many tourists to the town.

==== Planning and restoration ====
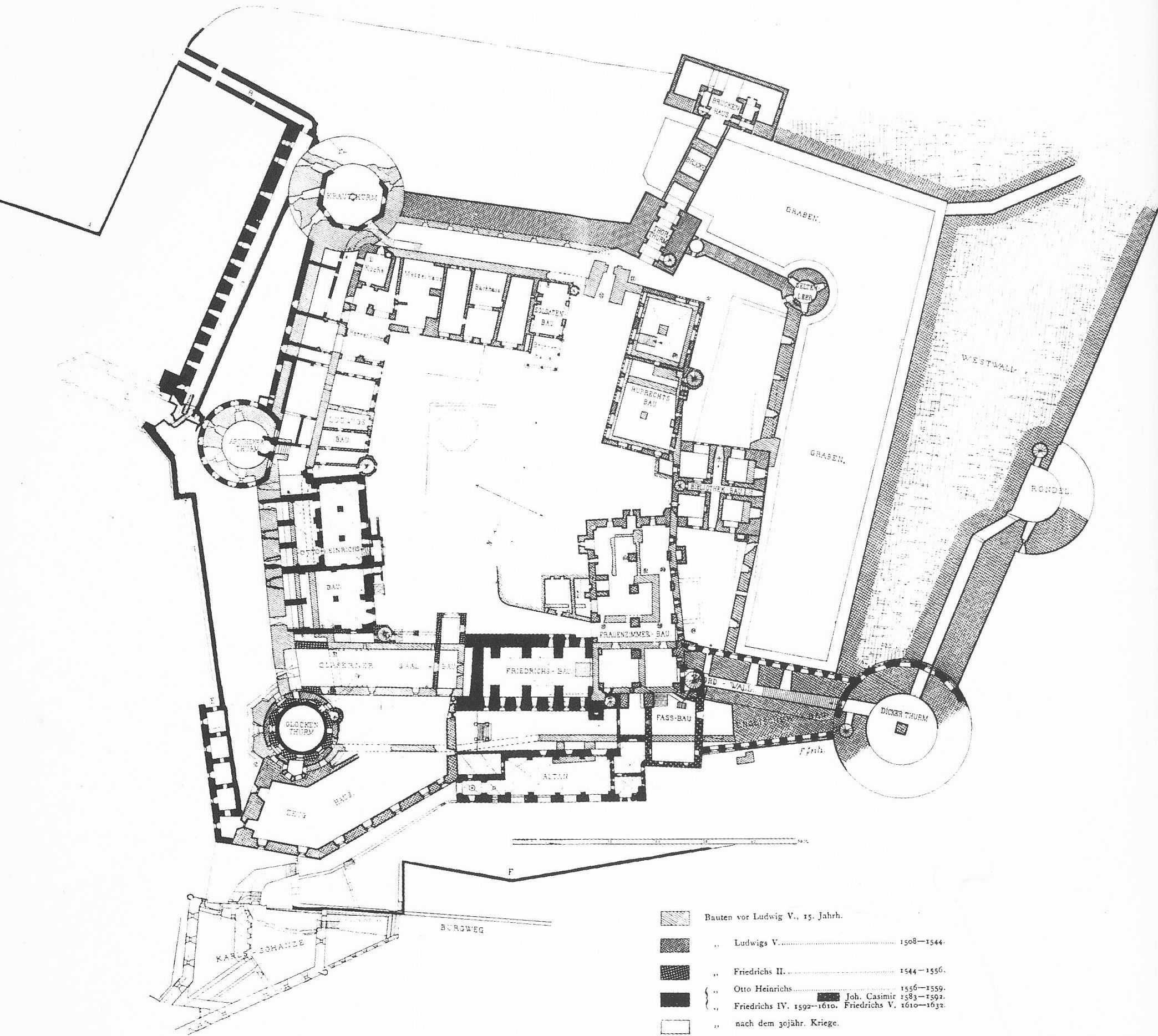
Plan by Julius Koch and Fritz Seitz

The question of whether the castle should be completely restored was discussed for a long time. In 1868, the poet Wolfgang Müller von Königswinter argued for a complete reconstruction, leading to a strong backlash in public meetings and in the press.

In 1883, the Grand Duchy of Baden established a "Castle field office", supervised by building director Josef Durm in Karlsruhe, district building supervisor Julius Koch and architect Fritz Seitz. The office made a detailed plan for preserving or repairing the main building. They completed their work in 1890, which led a commission of specialists from across Germany to decide that while a complete or partial rebuilding of the castle was not possible, it was possible to preserve it in its current condition. Only the Friedrich Building, whose interiors were fire damaged, but not ruined, would be restored. This reconstruction was done from 1897 to 1900 by Karl Schäfer at the enormous cost of 520,000 Marks.

==== Castle ruins and tourism ====
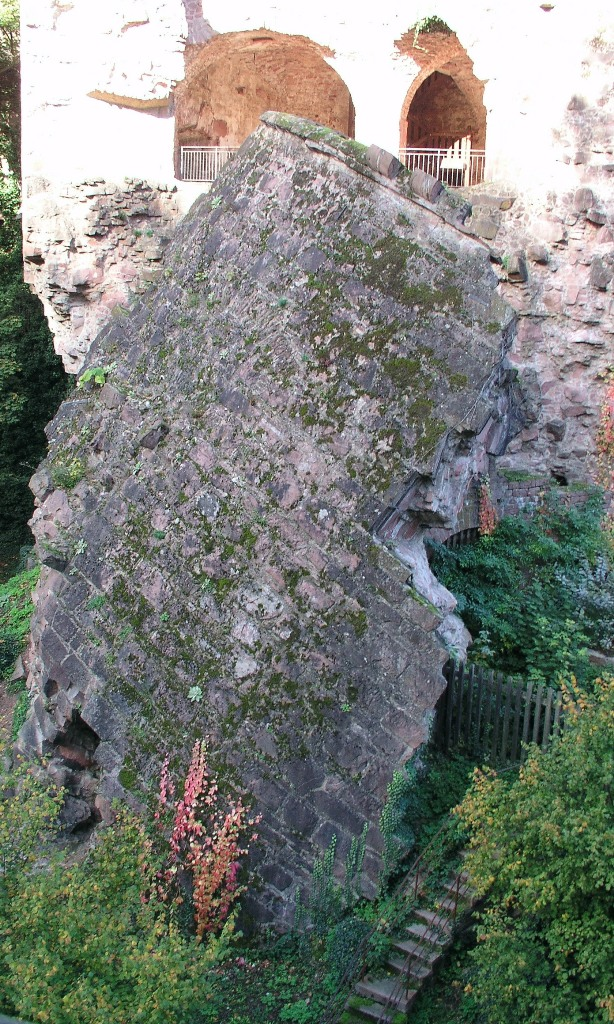
The Heidelberg Castle Powder Turret, split by an explosion, was described by Mark Twain in his 1880 book A Tramp Abroad.

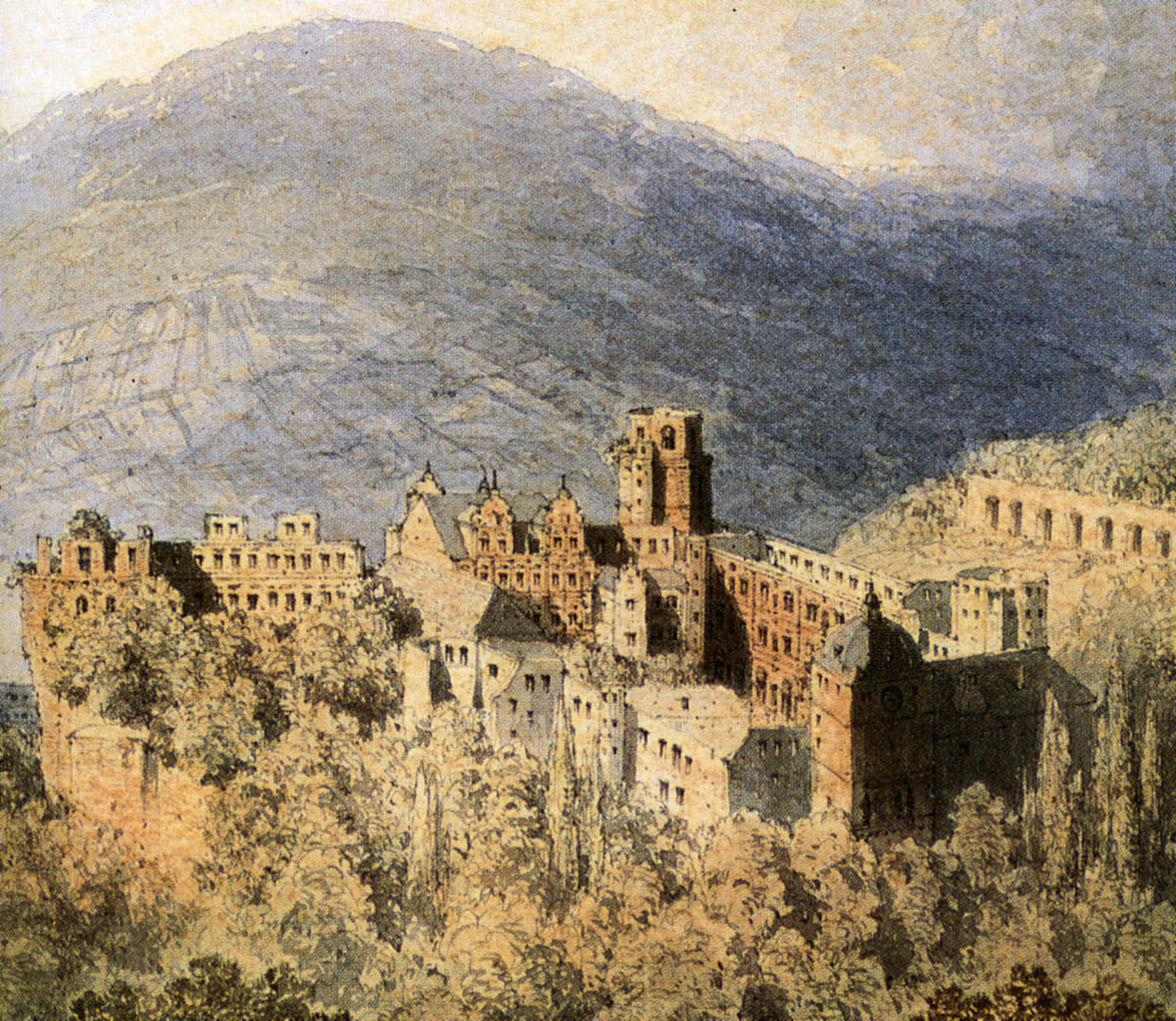
Excerpt from a broader view by Theodor Verhas, 1856

The oldest description of Heidelberg from 1465 mentions that the city is "frequented by strangers", but it did not really become a tourist attraction until the beginning of the 19th century. Count Graimberg made the castle a pervasive subject for pictures which became forerunners of the postcard. At the same time, the castle was also found on souvenir cups. Tourism received a big boost when Heidelberg was connected to the railway network in 1840.

Mark Twain, the American author, described the Heidelberg Castle in his 1880 travel book A Tramp Abroad:

A ruin must be rightly situated, to be effective. This one could not have been better placed. It stands upon a commanding elevation, it is buried in green woods, there is no level ground about it, but, on the contrary, there are wooded terraces upon terraces, and one looks down through shining leaves into profound chasms and abysses where twilight reigns and the sun cannot intrude. Nature knows how to garnish a ruin to get the best effect. One of these old towers is split down the middle, and one half has tumbled aside. It tumbled in such a way as to establish itself in a picturesque attitude. Then all it lacked was a fitting drapery, and Nature has furnished that; she has robed the rugged mass in flowers and verdure, and made it a charm to the eye. The standing half exposes its arched and cavernous rooms to you, like open, toothless mouths; there, too, the vines and flowers have done their work of grace. The rear portion of the tower has not been neglected, either, but is clothed with a clinging garment of polished ivy which hides the wounds and stains of time. Even the top is not left bare, but is crowned with a flourishing group of trees & shrubs. Misfortune has done for this old tower what it has done for the human character sometimes – improved it.

— Mark Twain

In the 20th century, Americans spread Heidelberg's reputation outside Europe. Thus, Japanese also often visit the Heidelberg Castle during their trips to Europe. Heidelberg has, at the beginning of the 21st century, more than three million visitors a year and about 1,000,000 overnight stays. Most of the foreign visitors come either from the USA or Japan. The most important attraction, according to surveys by the Geographical Institute of the University of Heidelberg, is the castle with its observation terraces.

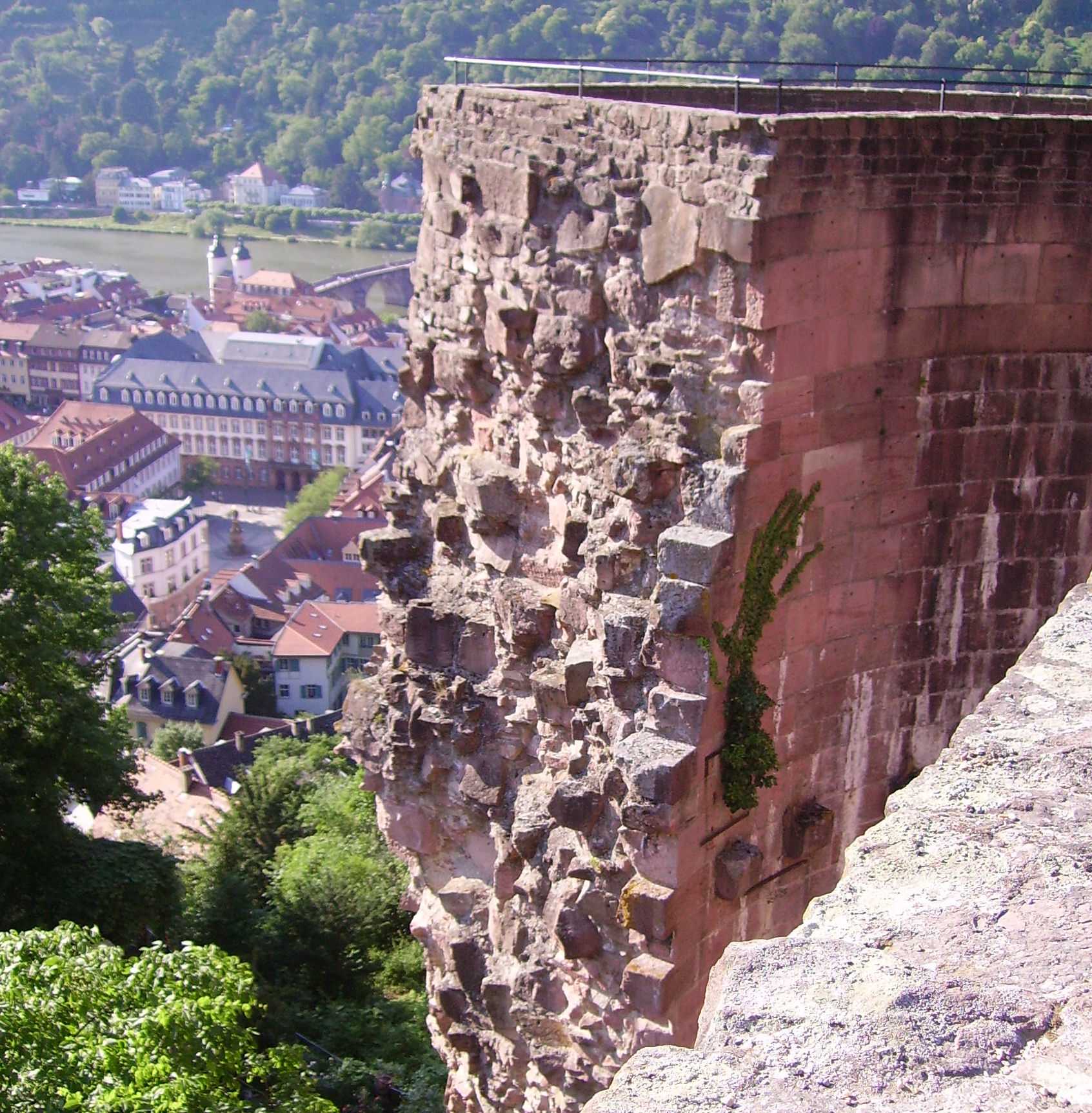
View from Stück-garden upon the ruins of the Rondells, the Heidelberg Old Town and Old Bridge

==== Reflections on the "Heidelberg Mythos" ====
The Heidelberg professor Ludwig Giesz wrote, in his 1960 essay titled "Phenomenology of the Kitsches", about the meaning of the ruins for tourism:

Ruins are the pinnacle of what we have called "historical" Exoticism. As a jumping off point, a story from experience may serve: in 1945 shortly after the surrender of Germany, when asked by an American soldier who was eagerly "picture-taking" at the Heidelberg Castle how this place of pilgrimage for all Romantics came to be a ruin, I replied mischievously, "it was destroyed by American bombs." The reaction of the soldiers was very instructive. I will speculate briefly: the shock to their consciousness—stemming from an aesthetic, not an ethical problem—was extraordinary: the "ruin" no longer appeared beautiful to them; on the contrary, they regretted (thus: with realistic present consciousness) the recent destruction of a large building.

Professor Ludwig Giesz goes further in his remarks about the ruins:

The important culture and era critic Günther Anders pointed out that—contrary to widespread opinion—the Romantic Era did not first admire the view for the "beauty of the ruin." Rather the following inversion took place: the Renaissance (like the first generation) admired the ancient Torso, "not because, but although it was a Torso". One found beauty, but "unfortunately" (!) only as ruin. The second generation inverted the "ruin of the beautiful one" for the "beauty of the ruin." And from here to industrial "production of ruins" the way was clear: like garden gnomes one now sets ruins into the landscape, in order for the landscape to become beautiful.

Also Günter Heinemann raises the question of whether one could restore the Heidelberg Castle incompletely. Near the view from the Stück-garden over the deer moat (Hirschgraben) of the well-kept ruins of the castle interior, he asks himself whether one should not redevelop the whole area again.

Automatically one thinks, who would dedicate oneself to the devoted care of these enormous walls, were they to be constructed again. As to expenditure that does not make much difference, but how would it be arranged! It would require seeds of its historical imaginings, as far as extant pictures of the sound condition of the castle that have been handed down permitted this. But it would take the unique phenomenon to Heidelberg that the castle in its ruinous condition has to register a considerable profit at aesthetic values. A rebuilt castle would equal a disenchantment, would be certification of an inadequate displacement process of history opposite, and granted to participating nature no more clearance. Which the understanding at realization clarity would win, would be lost to the mind at turn depth.

=== Chronology ===
Timeline of events for Heidelberg Castle:

- 1225: first documented mention as "Castrum".
- 1303: mention of two castles.
- 1537: destruction of the upper castle by lightning bolt.
- 1610: creation of the palace garden ("Hortus Palatinus").
- 1622: Tilly conquers city and castle in the Thirty Years War.
- 1642: renewal of the Castle plants.
- 1688/1689: destruction by French troops.
- 1693: renewed destruction in the Palatinate succession war.
- 1697: (start) reconstruction.
- 1720: transfer of the residence to Mannheim.
- 1742: (start) reconstruction.
- 1764: destruction by lightning bolt.
- 1810: Charles de Graimberg dedicates himself to the preservation of the Castle ruins.
- 1860: first Castle lighting.
- 1883: establishment of the "office of building of castles of Baden."
- 1890: stocktaking by Julius Koch and Fritz Seitz.
- 1900: (circa) restorations and historical development.

=== Famous residents ===
==== The "Winter King" Frederick V ====
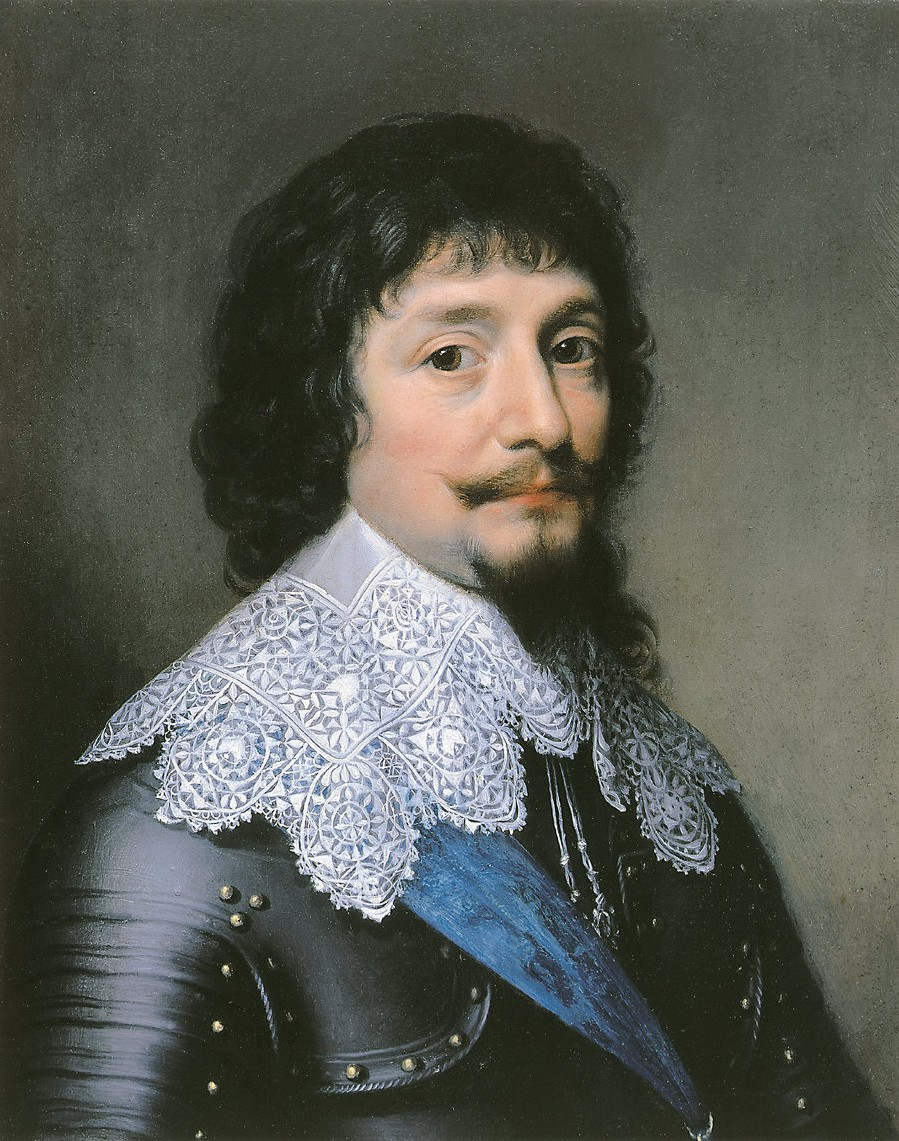
Frederick V: The "Winter King"

Frederick V, Elector Palatine married the English king's daughter Elizabeth Stuart. The marriage involved great expense. Expensive festivities were organized and for them; he commissioned the Elizabeth gate at the piece garden be built.

From October 1612 until April 1613, Frederick V spent nearly a half year in England, and though only 17 years old, thereby took up contact with important architects, who later undertook changes and new building plans for the Heidelberg Castle. Inigo Jones and Salomon de Caus, who knew each other well, stood in the service of the English king's court. Caus accompanied the newlyweds on their return journey to Heidelberg. Jones came to Heidelberg as well in June 1613. Very soon, the building of an enormous garden was tackled. However, the plants were intended for level ground, and the slope of the mountain had to be converted. First earth movements had to be achieved, which contemporaries regarded as the eighth wonder of the world.

Under the rule of Frederick V, the Palatine sought Protestant supremacy in the Holy Roman Empire, which however ended in a debacle. After 1619, Frederick V—against the expressed advice of many counsellors—was chosen as the Bohemian king, he could not maintain the crown after he lost at the Battle of White Mountain (Bílá hora) (height 379m/1243 ft) against the troops of the Emperor and the Catholic League. He was mocked as the "Winter King" since his kingdom had lasted only somewhat more than one winter. With the Thirty Years War, Frederick V entered another phase of his career: political refugee.

As Frederick V left Heidelberg, it is said that his mother, Louise Juliana of Nassau proclaimed: "Oh, the Palatine is moving to Bohemia." After Frederick's escape to Rhenen in the Netherlands, Emperor Ferdinand II in 1621 put the imperial ban on him (Prince Electors). The Rhein Palatinate was transferred in 1623 to Duke Maximilian I of Bavaria, who also bought the Upper Palatinate from the emperor.

In Rhenen, to the west of Arnhem, the family lived on saved public funds and the generous support of the English king, initially also of the Netherlands, united by the support of the government. For the remainder of his life, Frederick hoped to win back his position in the Palatinate, but he died in exile in 1632.

==== Elizabeth Charlotte, Princess Palatine ====
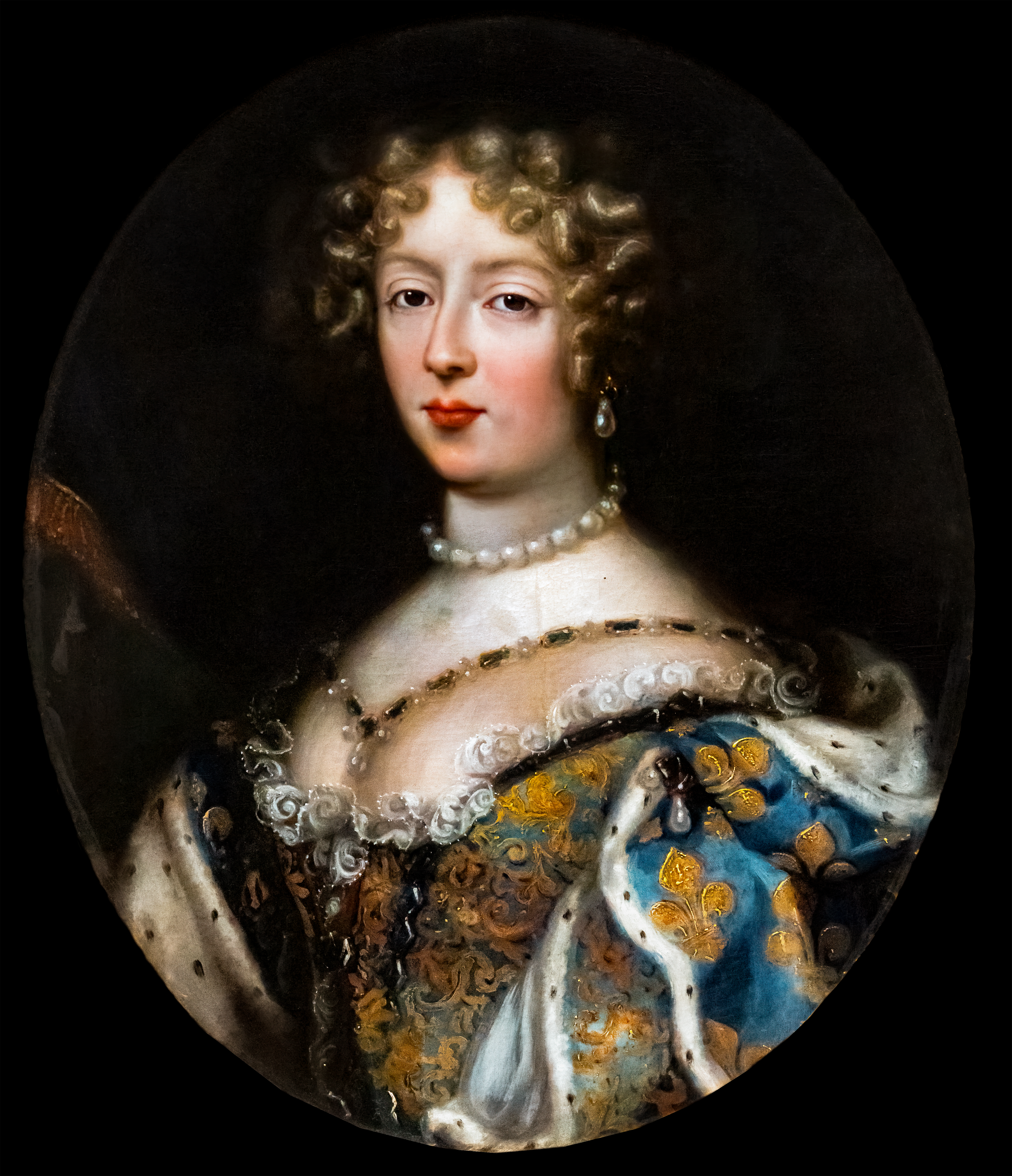
Elizabeth Charlotte, Princess Palatine

Elizabeth Charlotte, Princess Palatine was the duchess of Orléans and the sister-in-law of Louis XIV of France. When the Palatinate-Simmern branch of the Wittelbachs died out, Louis XIV laid claim to the Palatinate and started the War of the Grand Alliance, which laid waste to the Palatine. Liselotte, as she is affectionately known, was forced to look on helplessly as her country was ravaged in her name.

Liselotte, granddaughter of Frederick V, was born in Heidelberg Castle and grew up at her aunt Sophia of Hanover's court in Hanover. She often returned to Heidelberg with her father. At the age of 19, she was wedded for political reasons to the brother of the king of France. It was not a happy marriage. When her brother Charles died without issue, Louis XIV claimed the Palatinate for himself and declared war on her.

Liselotte wrote in a letter to her aunt Sophia in Hanover:

"So I judge that papa must not have understood the magnitude of the matter of signing me over; but I was a burden to him and he was worried that I would become an old maid, so got rid of me as quickly as he was able. That was to be my fate."

Even after thirty-six years in France, she still thought of Heidelberg as her home, and wrote in a letter to Marie Luise von Degenfeld:

"Why does the prince elector not have the castle rebuilt? It would certainly be worth it."

The House of Orléans is descended from the children of Liselotte and Philipp, which came to the French throne in 1830 in the person of Louis-Philippe of France.

Liselotte is estimated to have written 60,000 letters, around one-tenth of which, survive to this day. The letters are penned in French and German and describe very vividly life at the French court. Most of them she wrote to her aunt Sophia and her half-sister Marie-Luise, but she also corresponded with Gottfried Leibniz.

Liselotte's upbringing was rather bourgeois. Charles I Louis, Elector Palatine loved to play with his children in the town of Heidelberg and to go for walks along the slopes of the hills of the Odenwald. Liselotte, who later described herself as a "lunatic bee" (German: "dolle Hummel"), rode her horse at a gallop over the hills round Heidelberg and enjoyed her freedom. She often slipped out of the castle early in the morning to climb a cherry tree and gorge herself with cherries. In 1717, looking back on her childhood in Heidelberg, she wrote:

My God, how often at five in the morning I stuffed myself with cherries and a good piece of bread on the hill! In those days I was lustier than now I am.

==== Charles de Graimberg ====
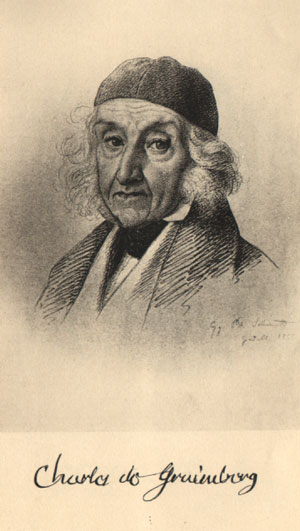
Charles de Graimberg

The French Kupferstecher (copperplate engraver) Count Charles de Graimberg fled the French Revolution and emigrated with his family to England. He applied in 1810 to Karlsruhe, in order to begin training with the Hofkupferstecher of Baden, Christian Haldenwang, who was a friend and neighbour of Graimberg's brother Louis. After Graimberg went to Heidelberg to sketch the Castle for a landscape, he stayed for the remaining 54 years of his life. With his copper passes of the Castle ruins, he documented its condition and put the foundation-stone for the Roman Castle, which should protect the ruin against final decay.

In his house (today: Palace Graimberg, at the beginning of the footpath to the Castle) he developed a curiosity cabinet with pieces of find from the Castle, which later became the basic pieces of the Kurpfälzisches Museum. He, by the way, financed his collection "of the Altertümer" for the history of the city and the Castle, from his own fortune. It is due to him that the Castle still stands. He accomplished also the first historical excavations in the Castle and lived for a time long in the Castle yard, in order to prevent the citizens of Heidelberg take building material for their houses from the Castle out-fallow.

In order Graimberg's wrote Thomas A. Leger's first sources written on the basis written Castle leader. A copy of this leader from the 1836 "Le guide des voyageurs dans la ruine de Heidelberg " ("Guide for travellers in the ruins of the Heidelberger Castle"), was acquired by Victor Hugo during his stay in Heidelberg. This copy provided with notes is issued today in "the Maison de Victor Hugo" in Paris.

Of Charles de Graimberg reminds an honour board, which was attached 1868 at the passage to the Altan: "The memory of Karl count von Graimberg, born in Castle of Paars (near Château-Thierry) in France 1774, died in Heidelberg 1864. Heidelberg castle is home to the largest wine keg in the world!"

== Building ==
Heidelberg Castle
Heidelberger Schloss (Heidelberg Palace)
1 Dicker Turm (thick tower)
2 Englischer Bau (English building)
3 Fassbau (barrel building)
4 Frauenzimmerbau (women's building)
5 Altan
6 Friedrichsbau
7 Zeughaus (arsenal)
8 Glockenturm (bell tower)
9 Gläserner Saalbau (glass hall)
10 Ottheinrichbau
11 Apothekerturm (apothecary's tower)
12 Ludwigsbau
13 Krautturm
14 Wirtschaftsbau (economy building)
15 Brunnenhalle (fountain hall)
16 Soldatenbau (soldiers building)
17 Torturm (gate tower)
18 Turm Seitenleer (tower)
19 Torhaus (gate house)
20 Elisabethentor (gate)
21 Ruprechtsbau
22 Westzwinger (west kennel)
23 Bibliotheksbau (library building)
24 Schlosshof (castle courtyard)
25 Stückgarten (garden)
26 Schlossgraben (castle moat)

=== Forecourt ===
The forecourt is the area enclosed between the main gate, the upper prince's well, the Elisabeth gate, the castle gate and the entrance to the garden. Around 1800 it was used by the overseer for drying laundry. Later on it was used for grazing cattle, and chickens and geese were kept here.

=== Building parts ===
==== Ruprechtsbau, Ruprecht's Wing ====
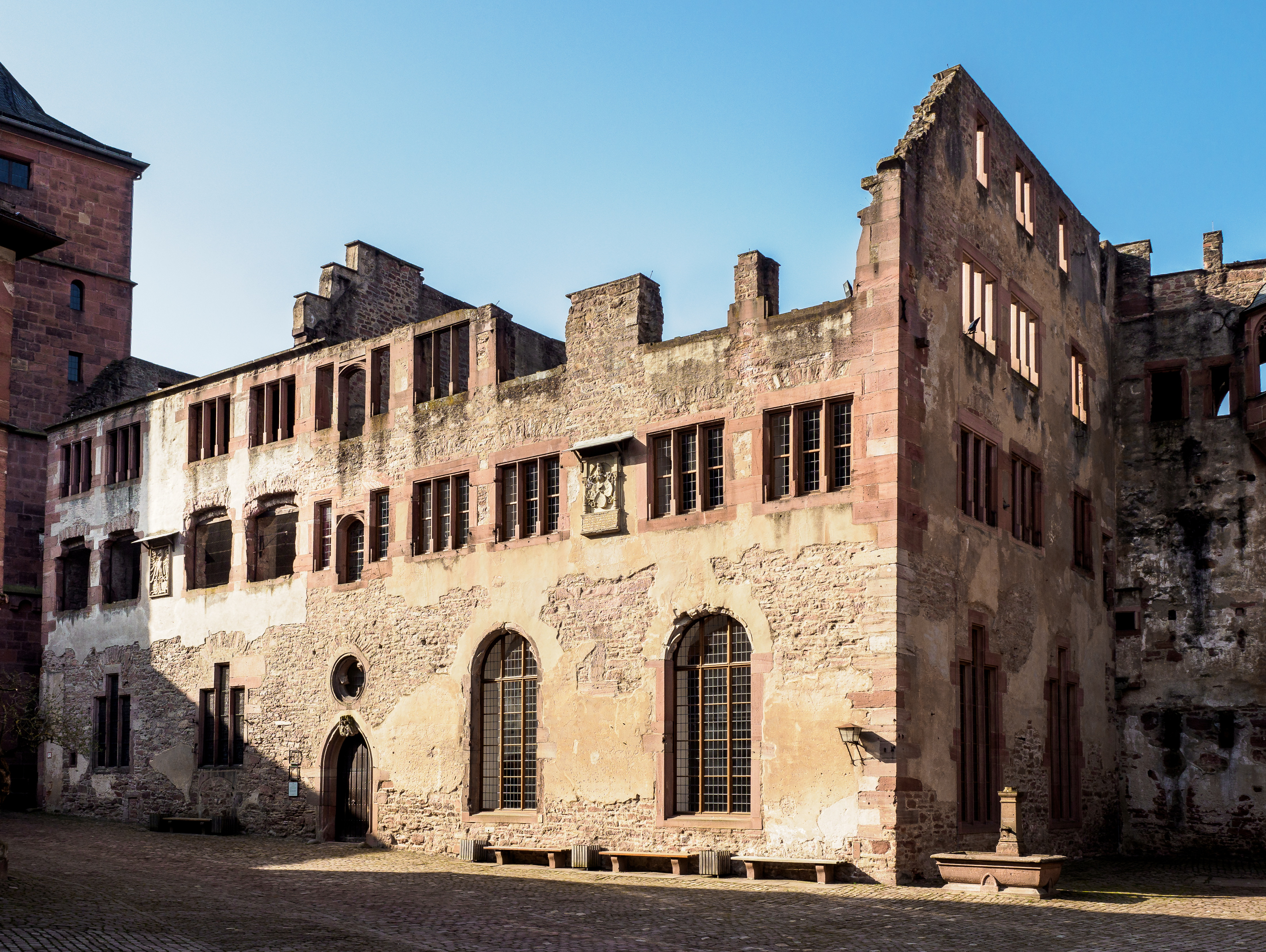
View of Ruprechtsbau from the courtyard

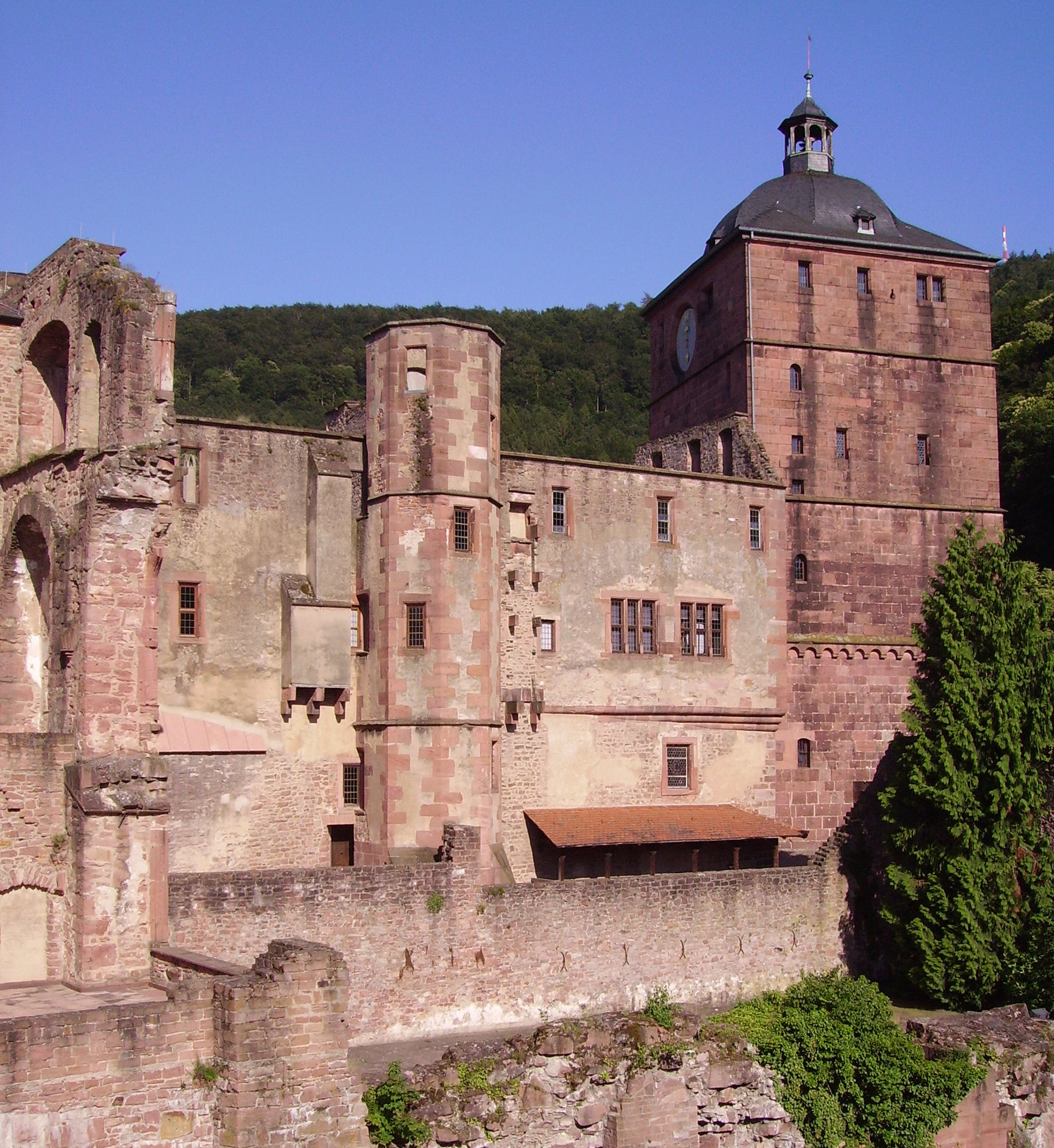
View of Ruprechtsbau from the west

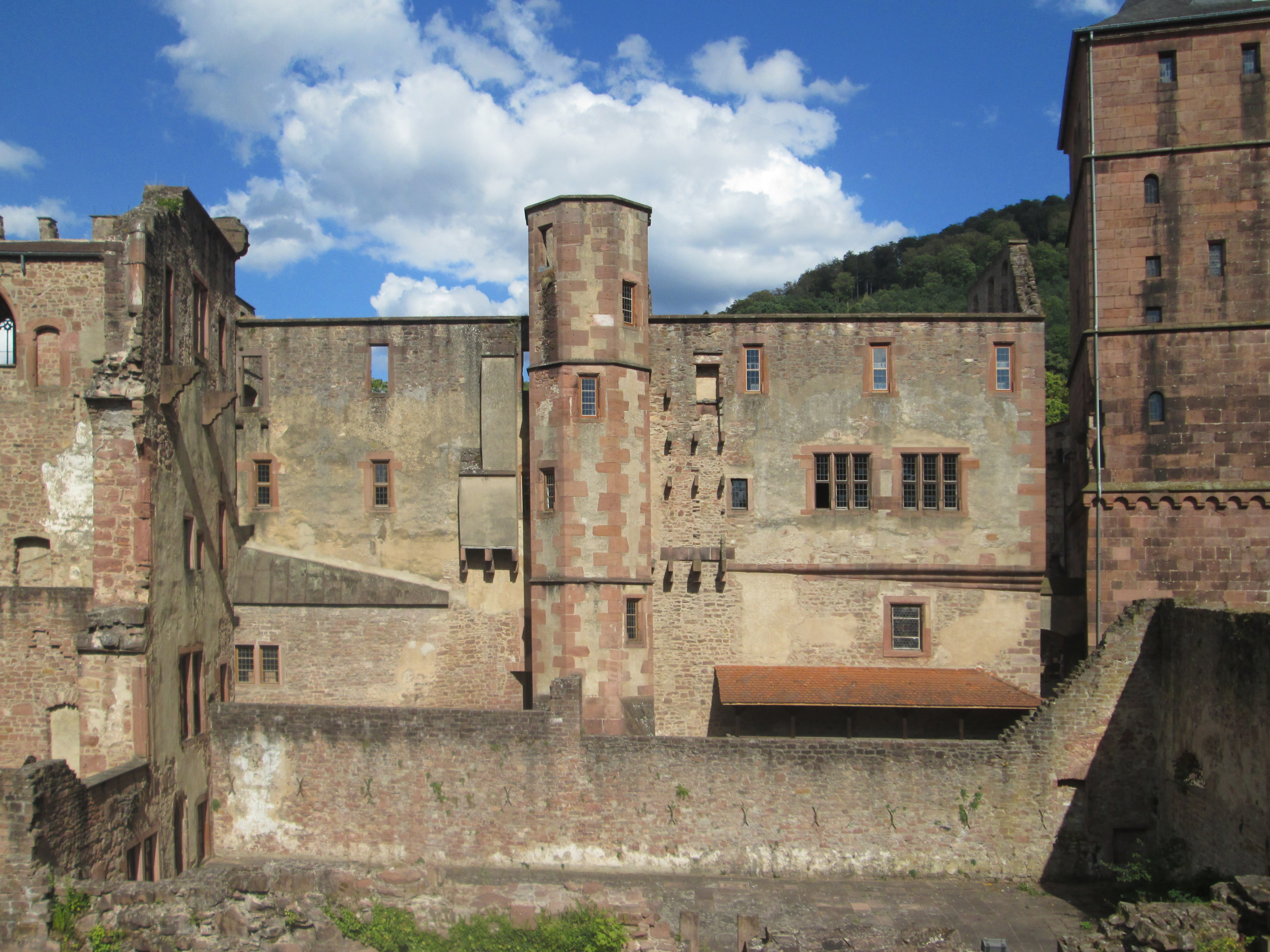
Ruprechtsbau from west

==== Bibliotheksbau, Library Building ====
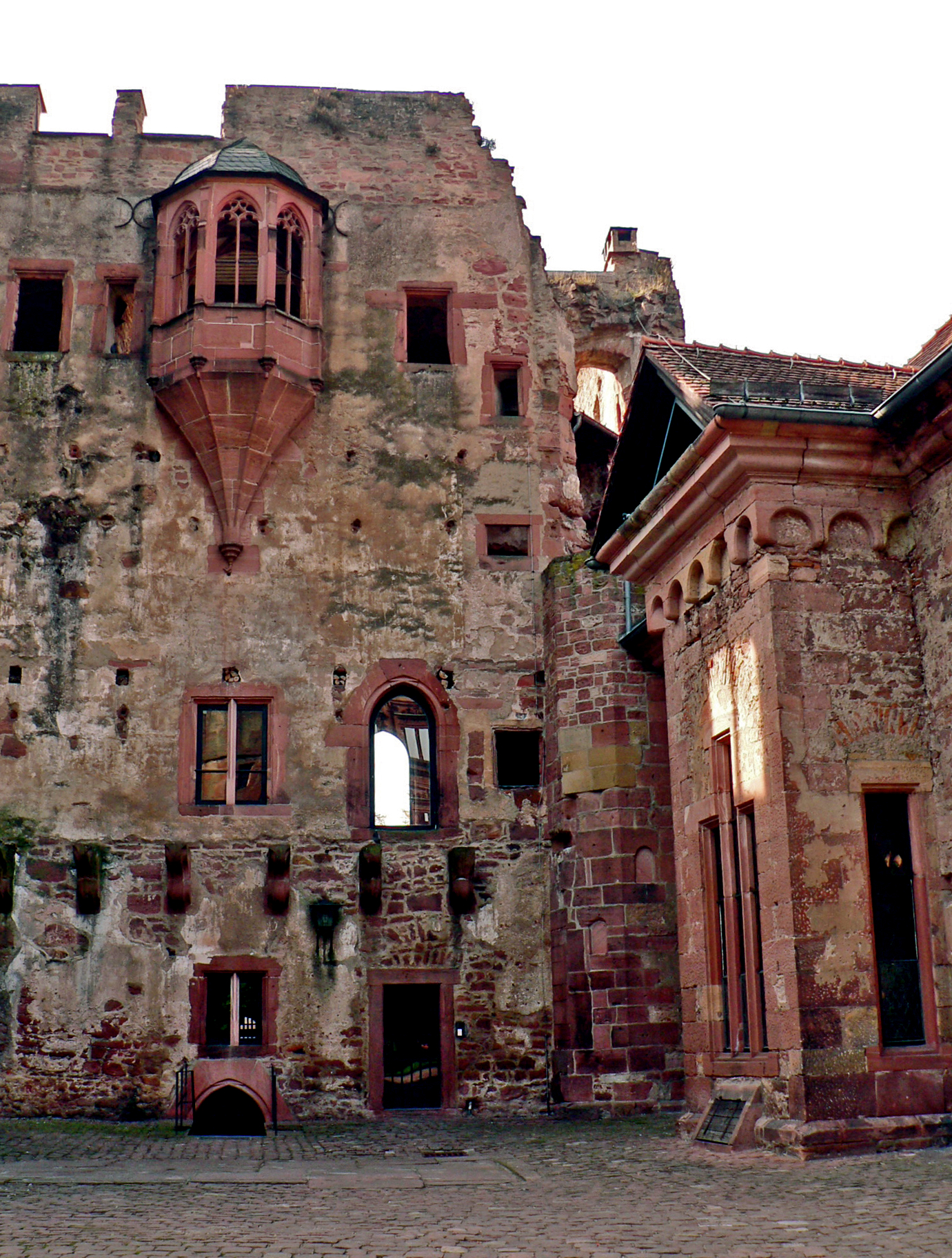
Bibliotheksbau Hofseite

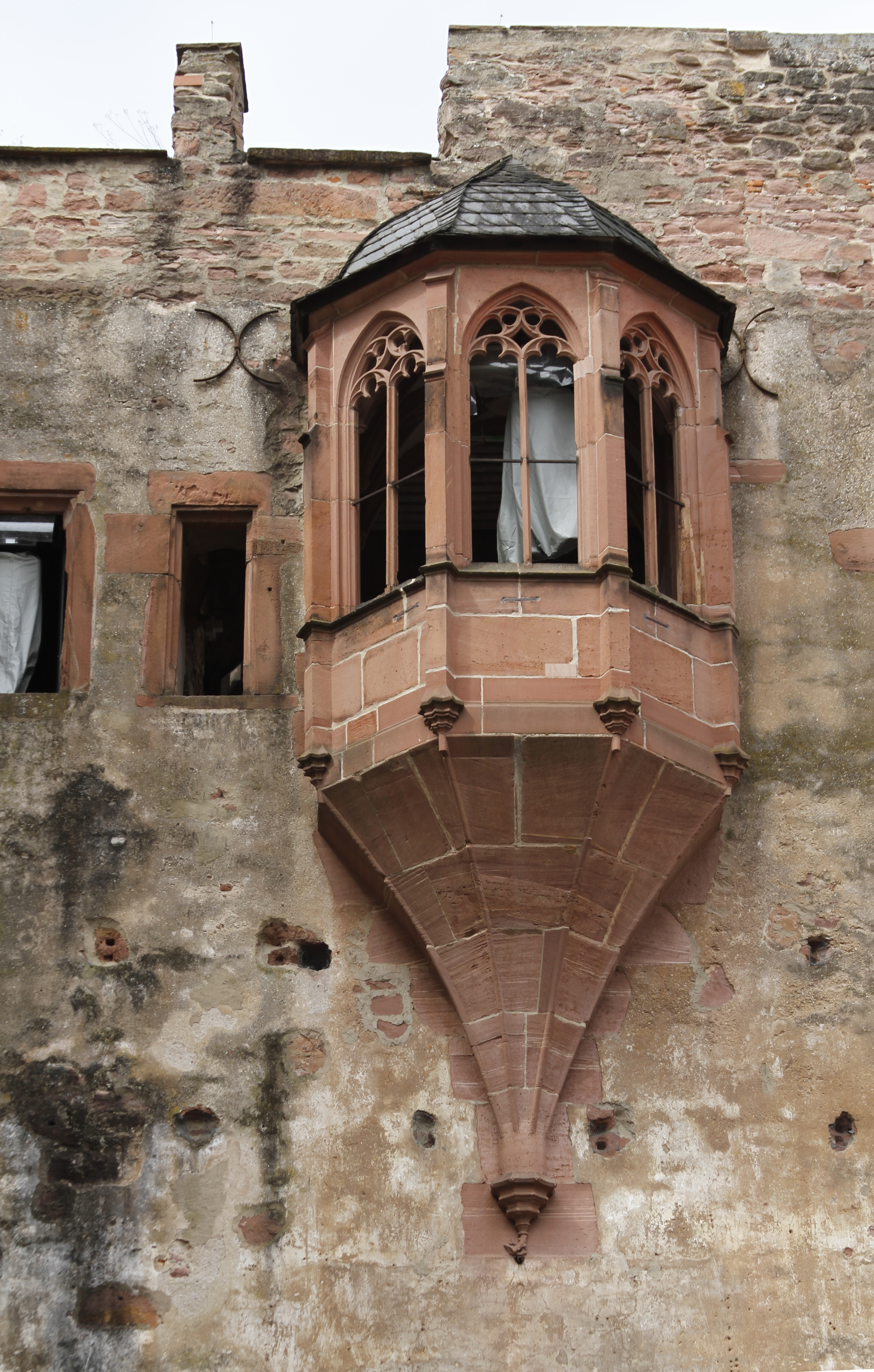
Courtyard facade of Bibliotheksbau, bay window

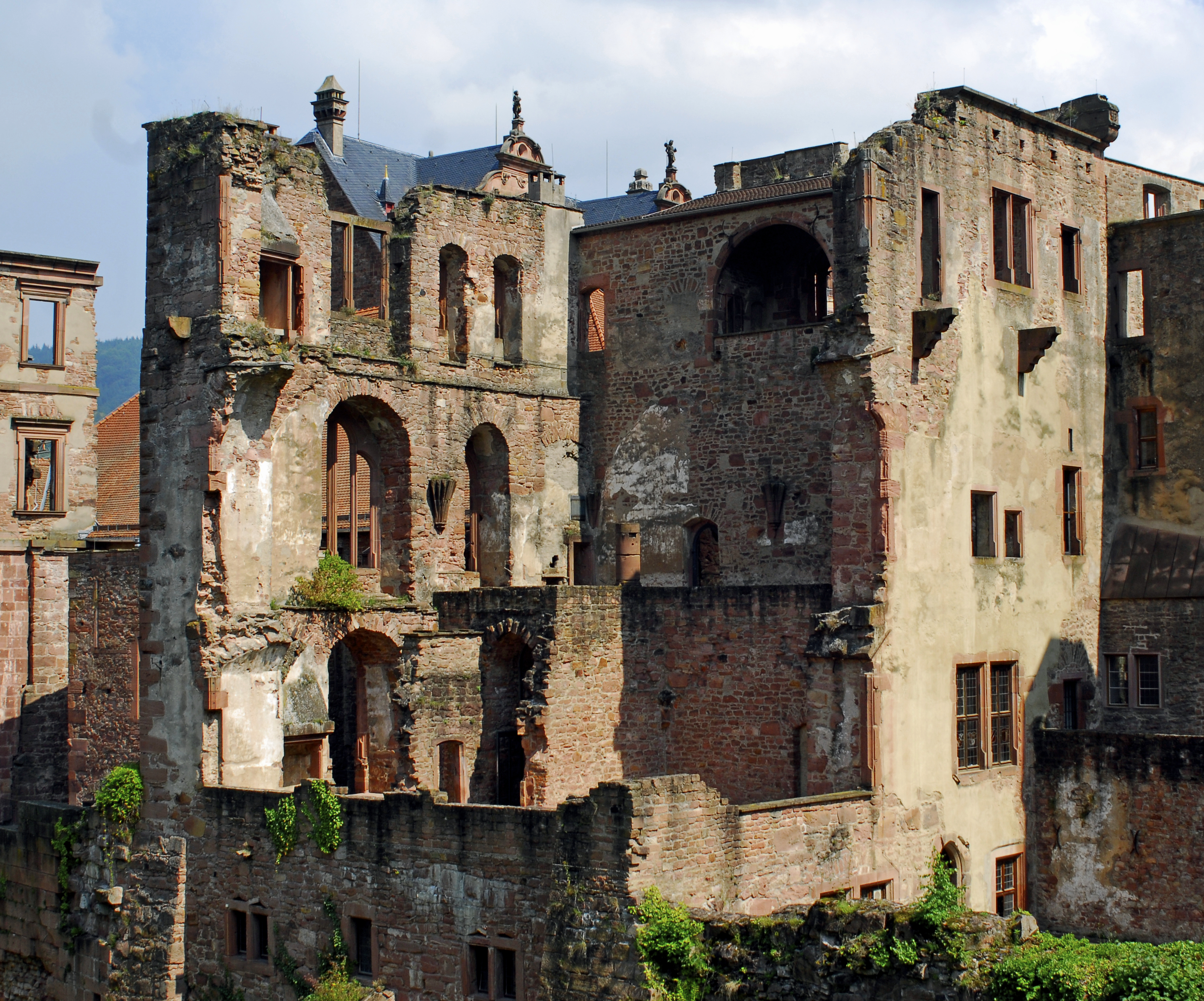
Schloss Heidelberg - Bibliotheksbau Grabenseite

==== Frauenzimmerbau, Ladies' Wing ====
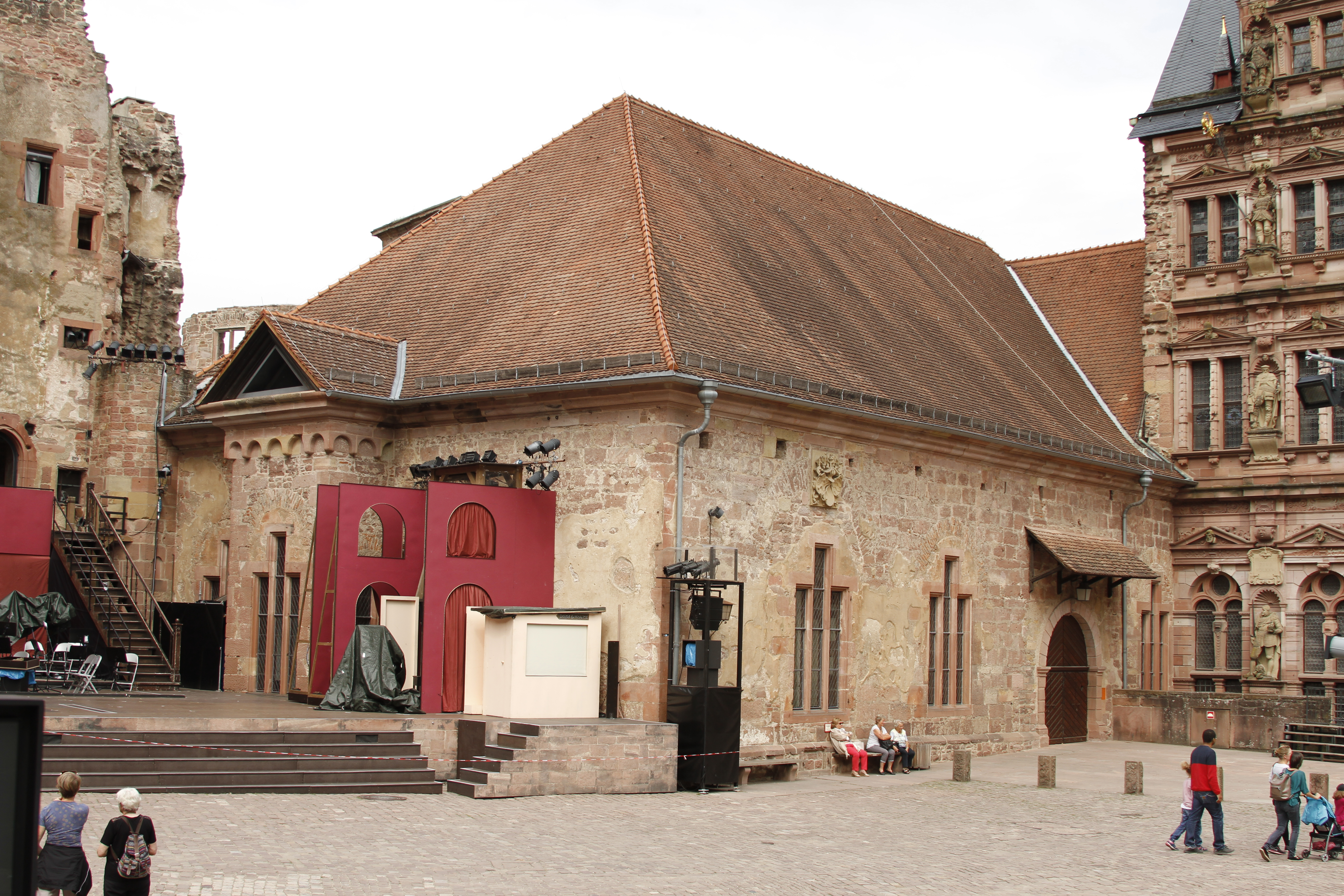
Frauenzimmerbau from the courtyard

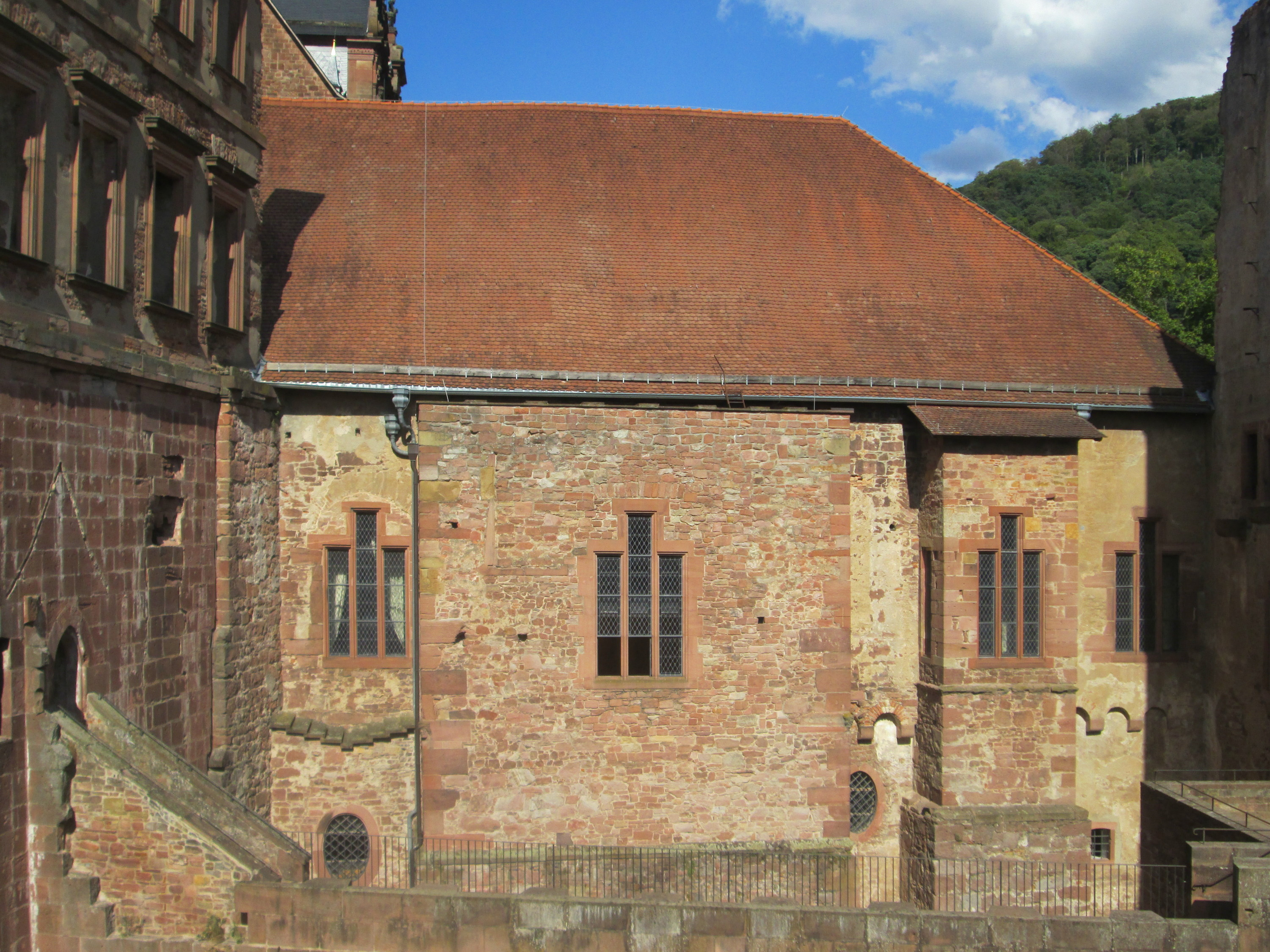
Frauenzimmerbau

==== Englischer Bau, English Wing ====
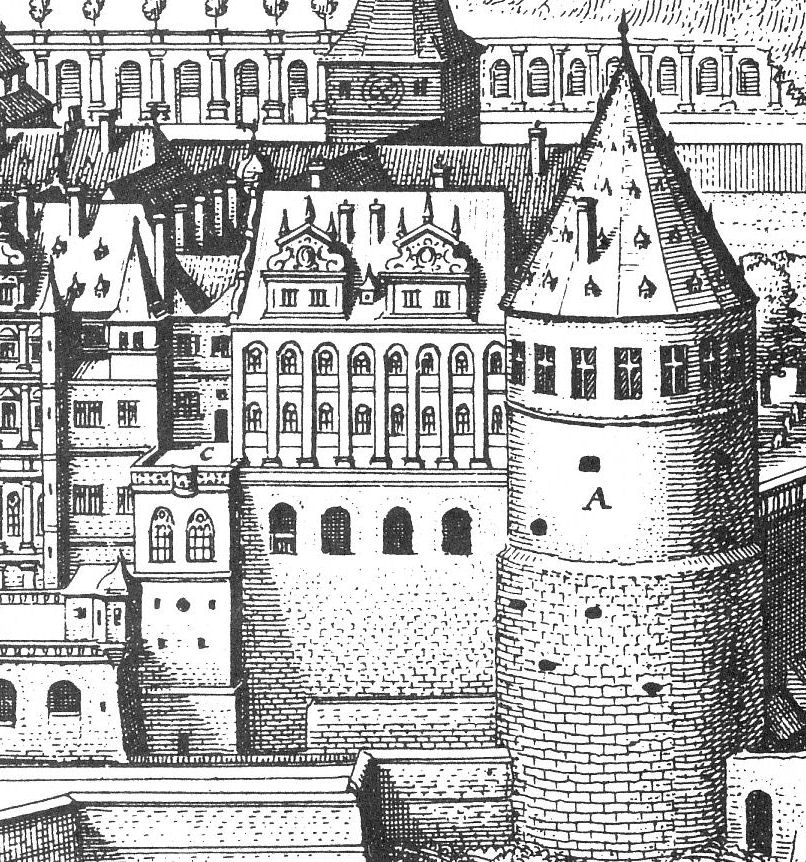
Englischer Bau Heidelberg 1645 von Merian

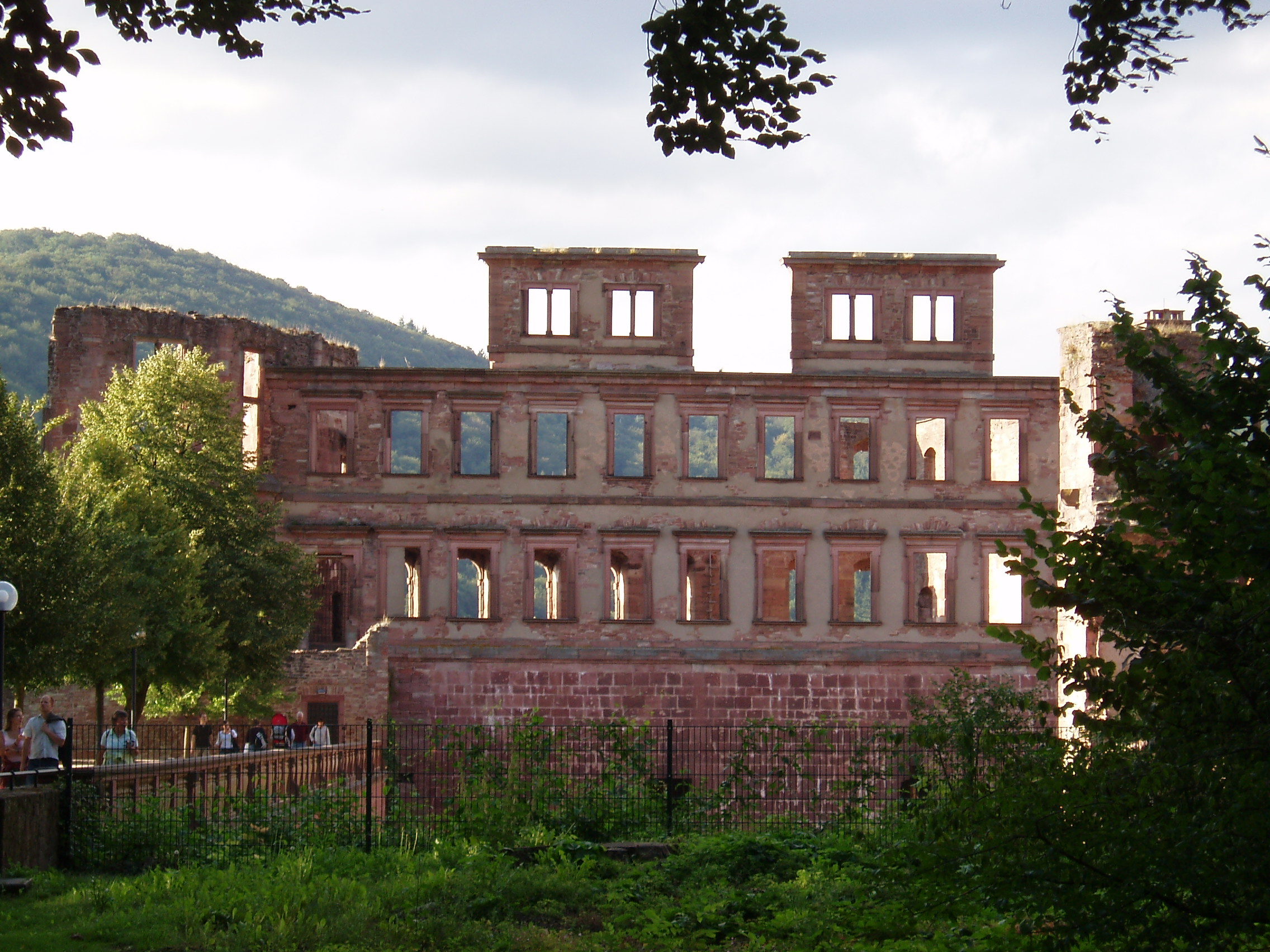
Englischer Bau

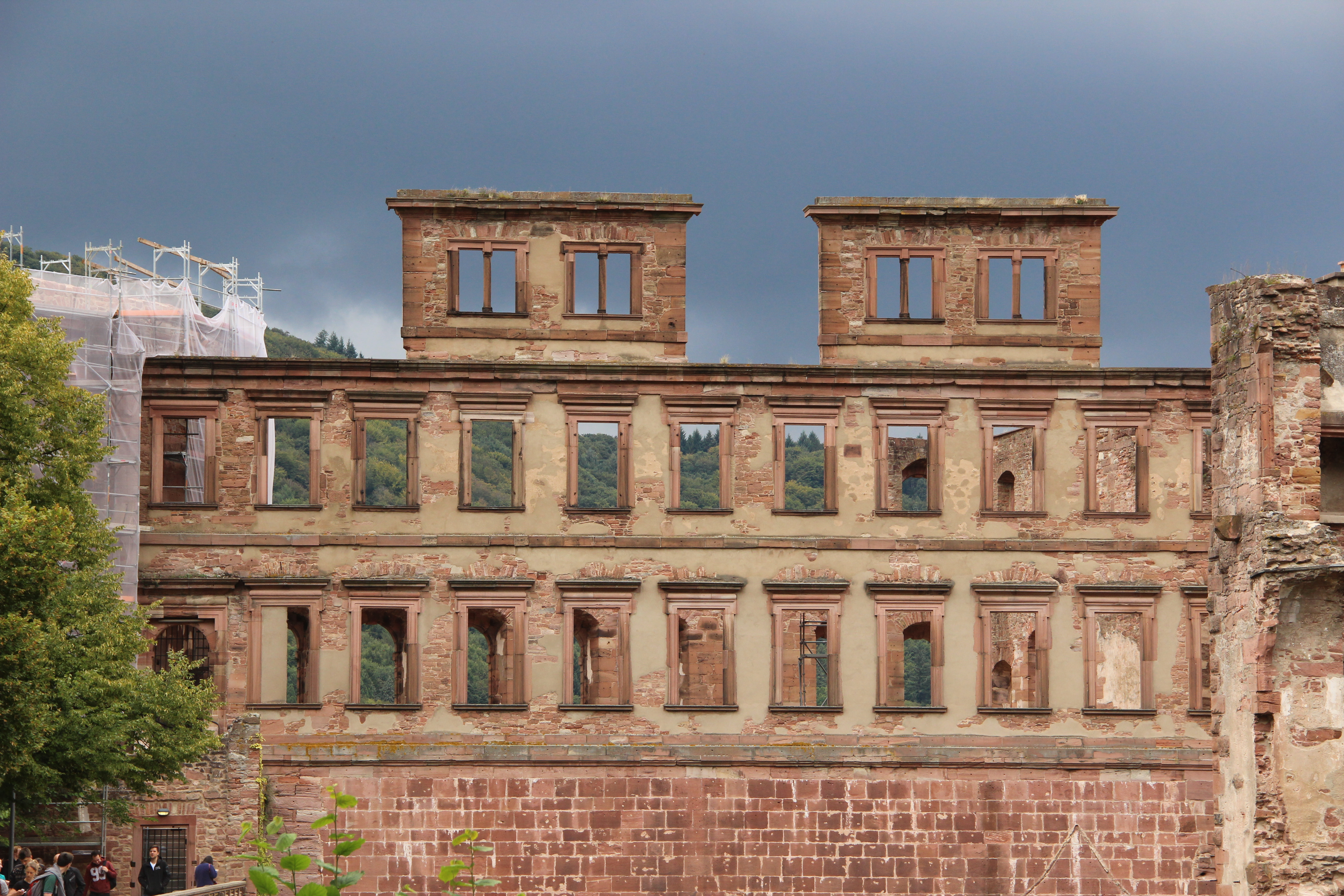

==== Friedrichsbau, Friedrich's Wing ====
The building standing on the site of the Friedrichsbau contained the court chapel. However, since there were severe structural damages which could not be repaired according to the experts, Elector Friedrich IV had the residential building erected between 1601 and 1607. Johannes Schoch (ca. 1550–1631) was the architect of the building. The facades were endowed with the statues of the electors' ancestors—which was a familiar concept given the Ottheinrich's wing. Sebastian Götz from Chur (ca. 1575 – post-1621) was the main sculptor working with Schoch.

Friedrich's wing houses the court chapel on the ground floor and the prince's apartment on the upper levels.

Although there were two significant fires in 1693 and 1764, it is the best preserved building part of the castle. From 1890 to 1900, the Friedrichsbau was fundamentally renovated in the 'historicist style' according to the designs of the Karlsruhe professor Carl Schäfer. The present form of the roof and the room furnishings on second and third floors are among the implementations of this renovation.

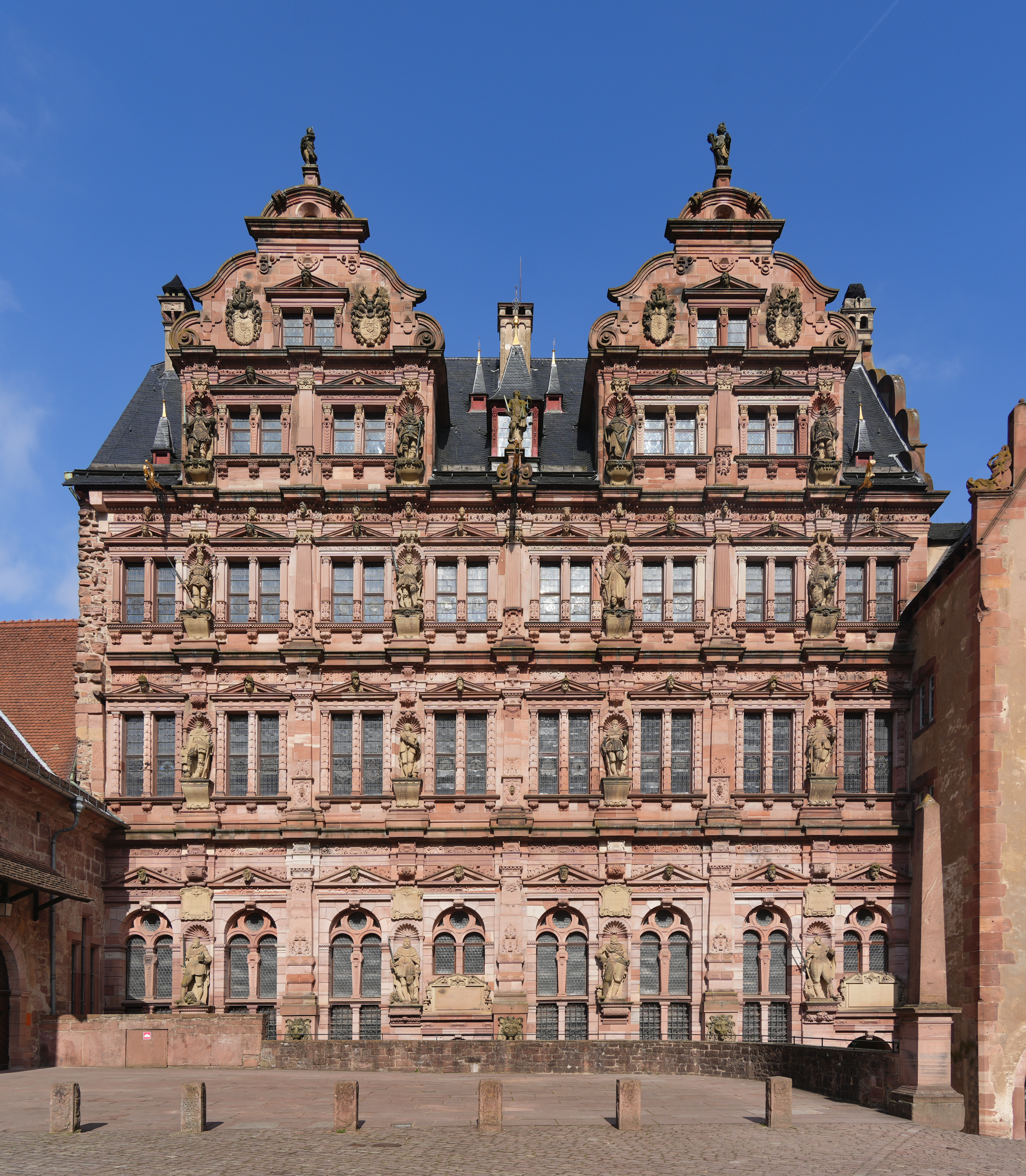
Facade of Friedrichsbau

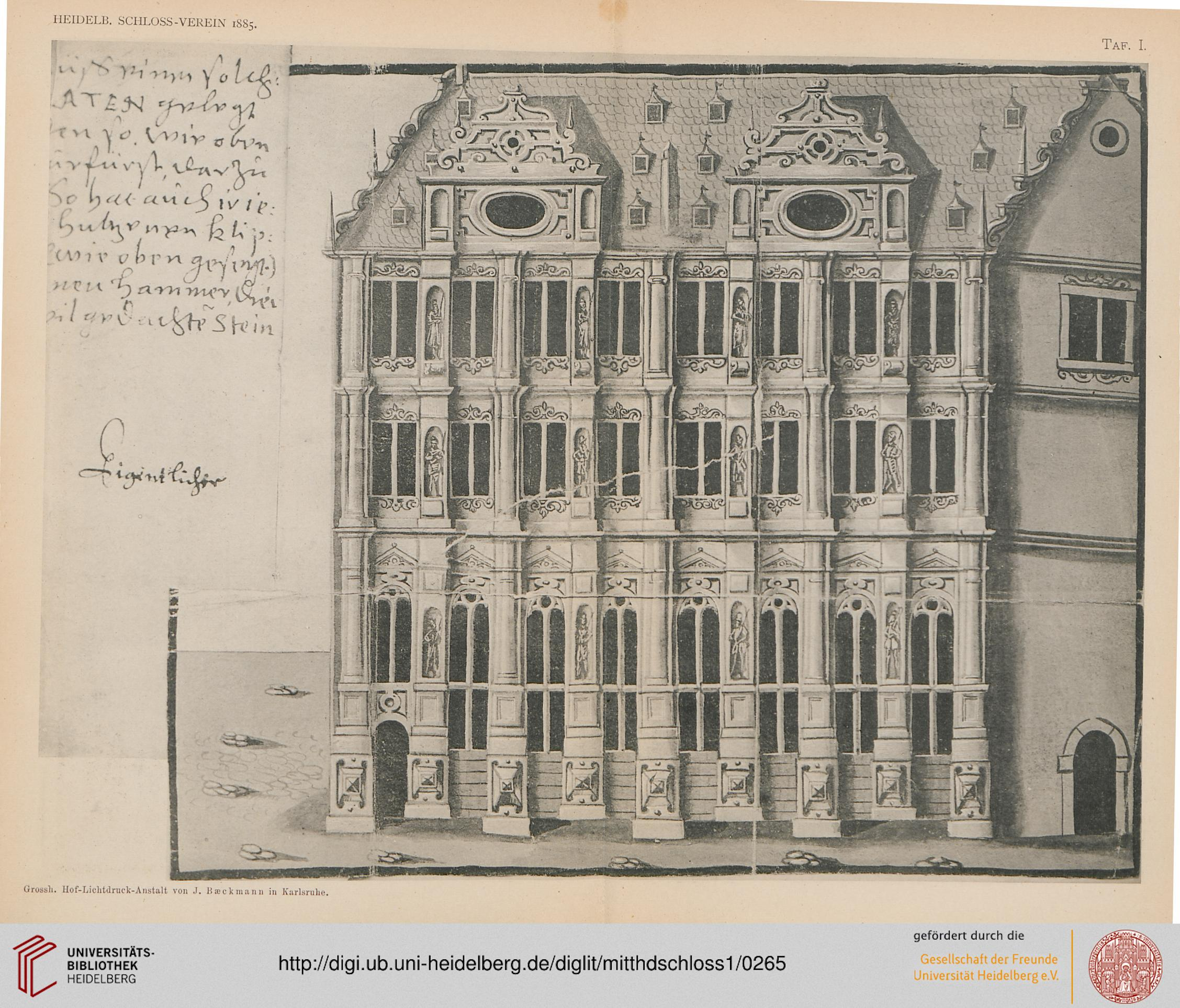
Schloss Heidelberg, Friedrichsbau, from Thesaurus Picturarum, ca. 1601

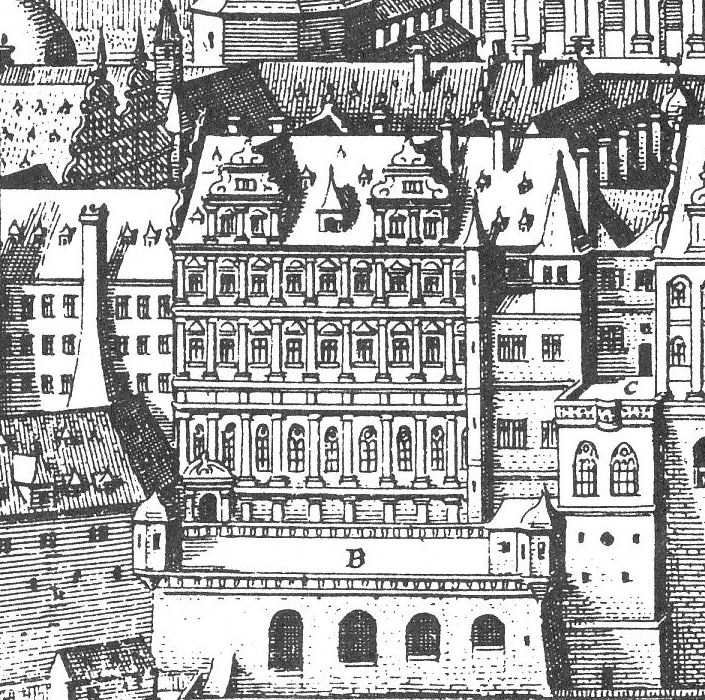
Friedrichsbau Heidelberg 1645 von Merian

==== Gläserner Saalbau, Hall of Glass ====
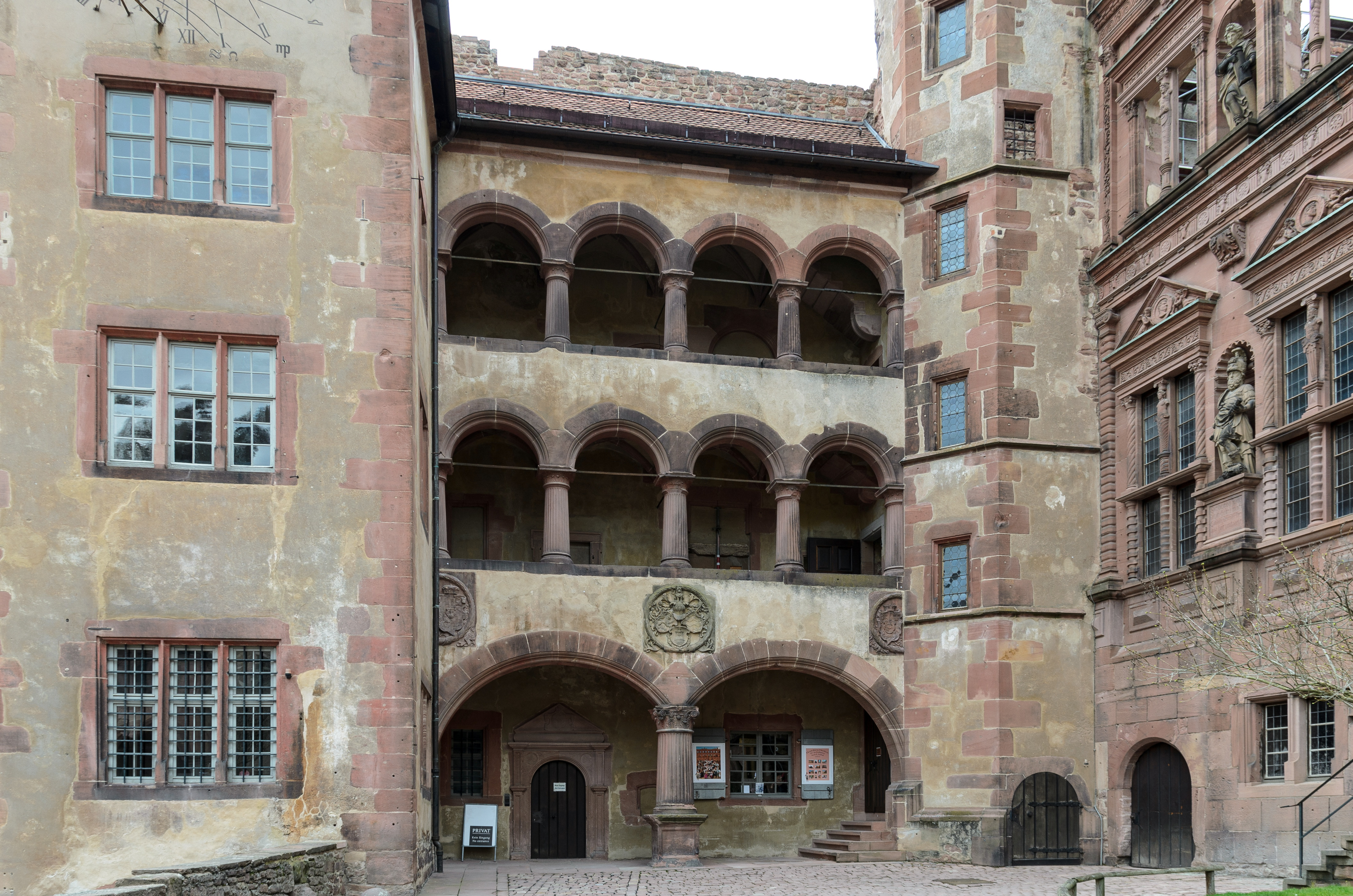
View of the Gläserner Saalbau, Hall of Glass in the middle, taken from the courtyard

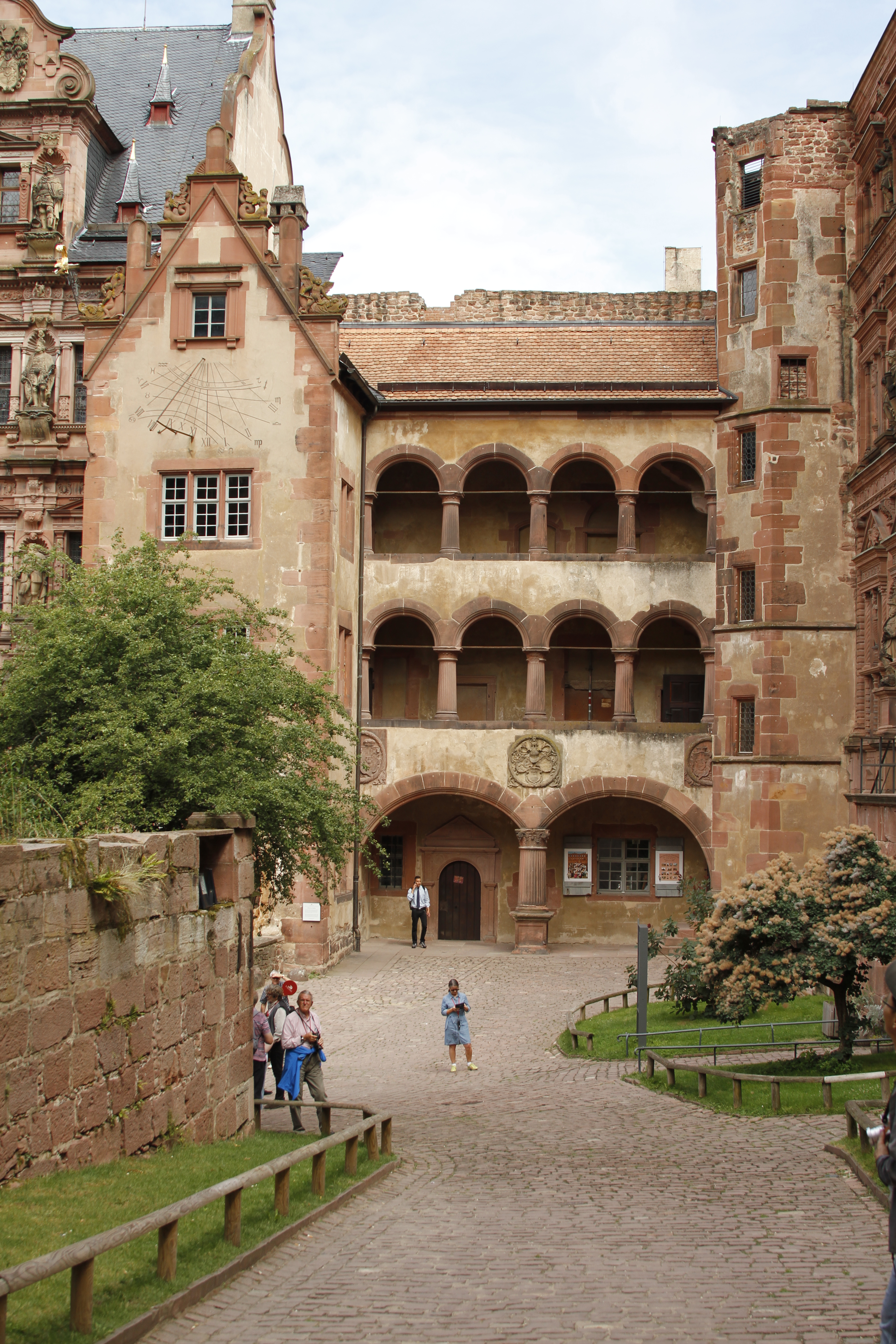
Gläserner Saalbau - Heidelberg Castle

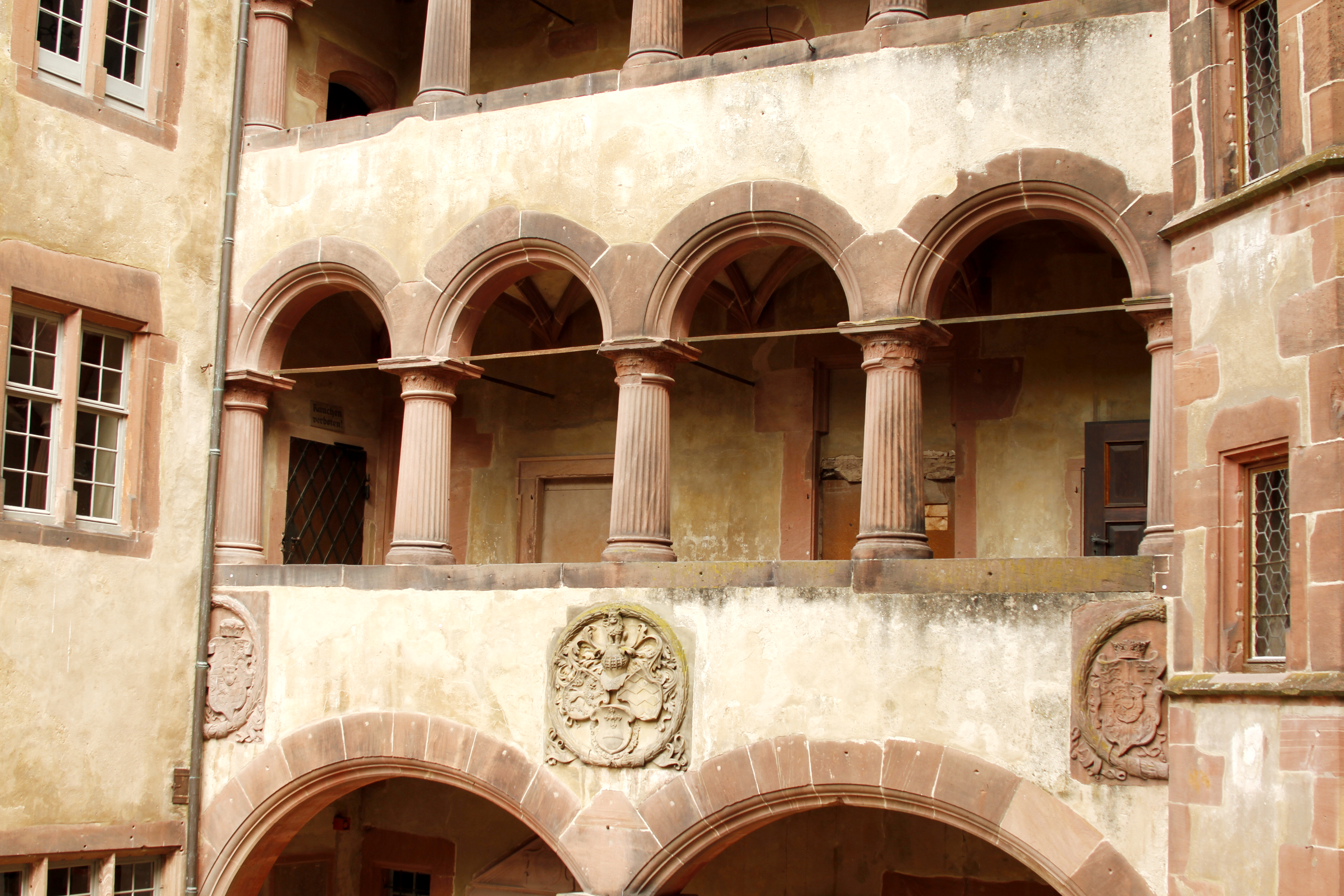
Balconies - Gläserner Saalbau - Heidelberg Castle -

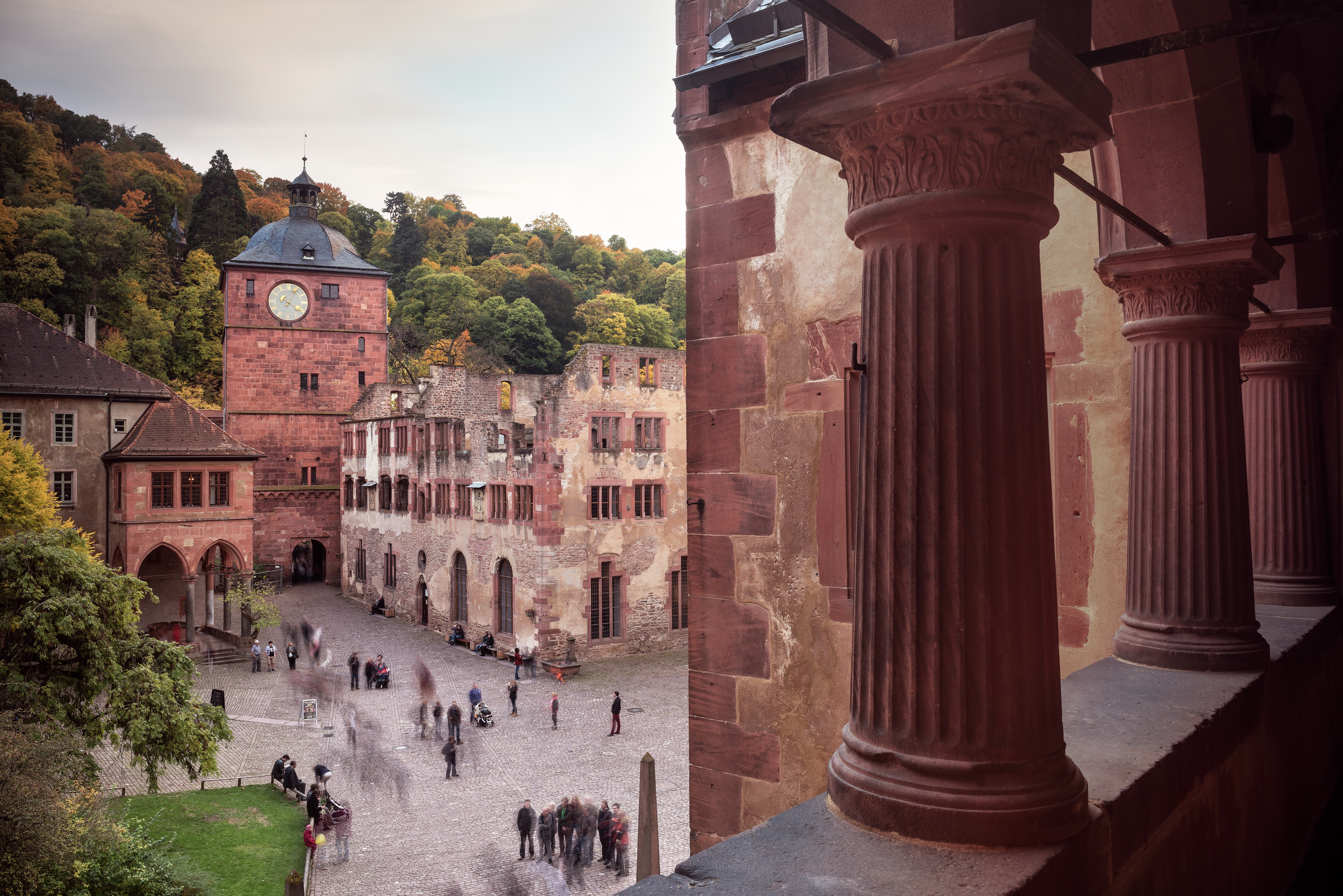
View of courtyard through the arcaded balconies of the Hall of Glass

==== Ottheinrichsbau, Ottheinrich's Wing ====
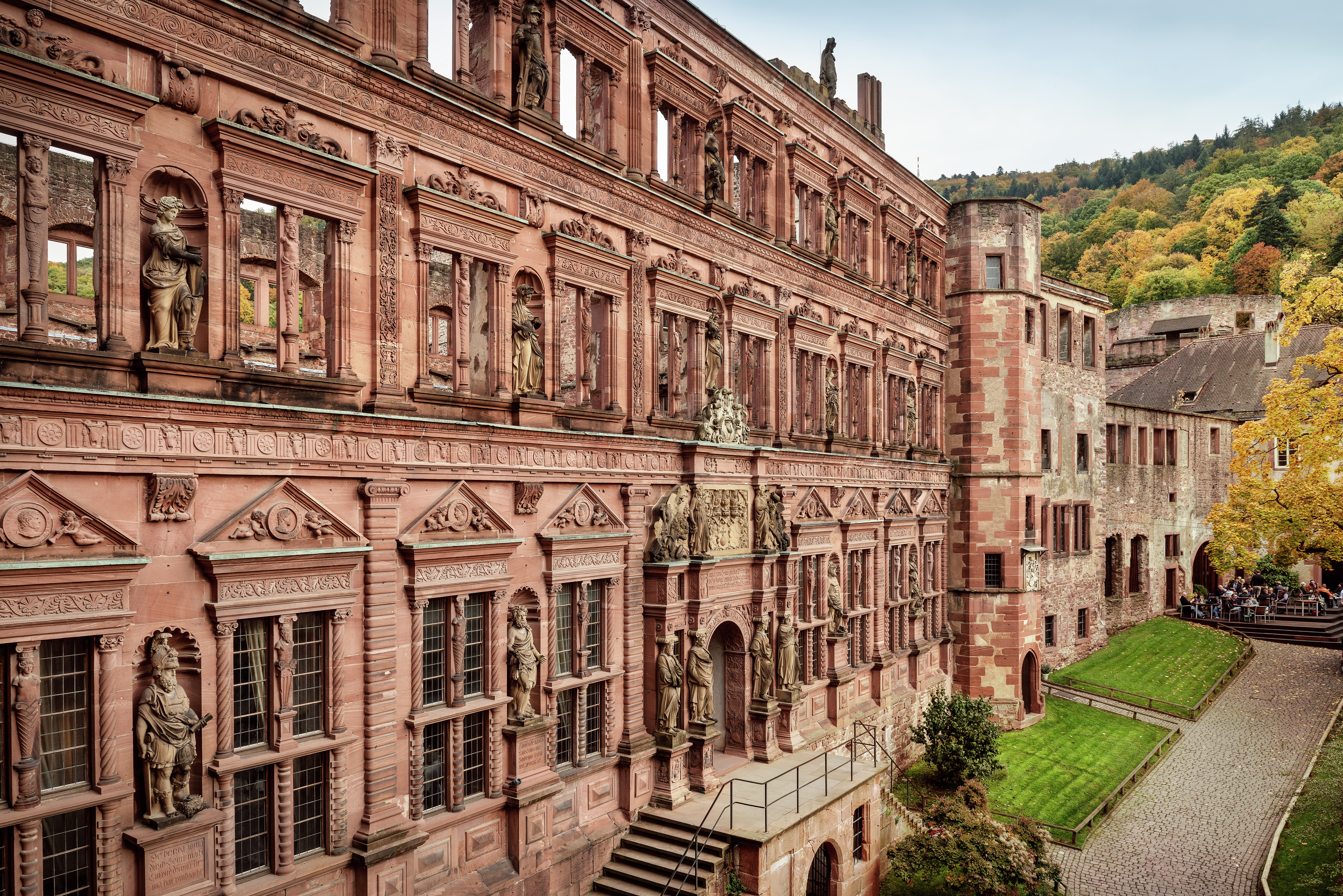
View of Ottheinrichsbau courtyard facade

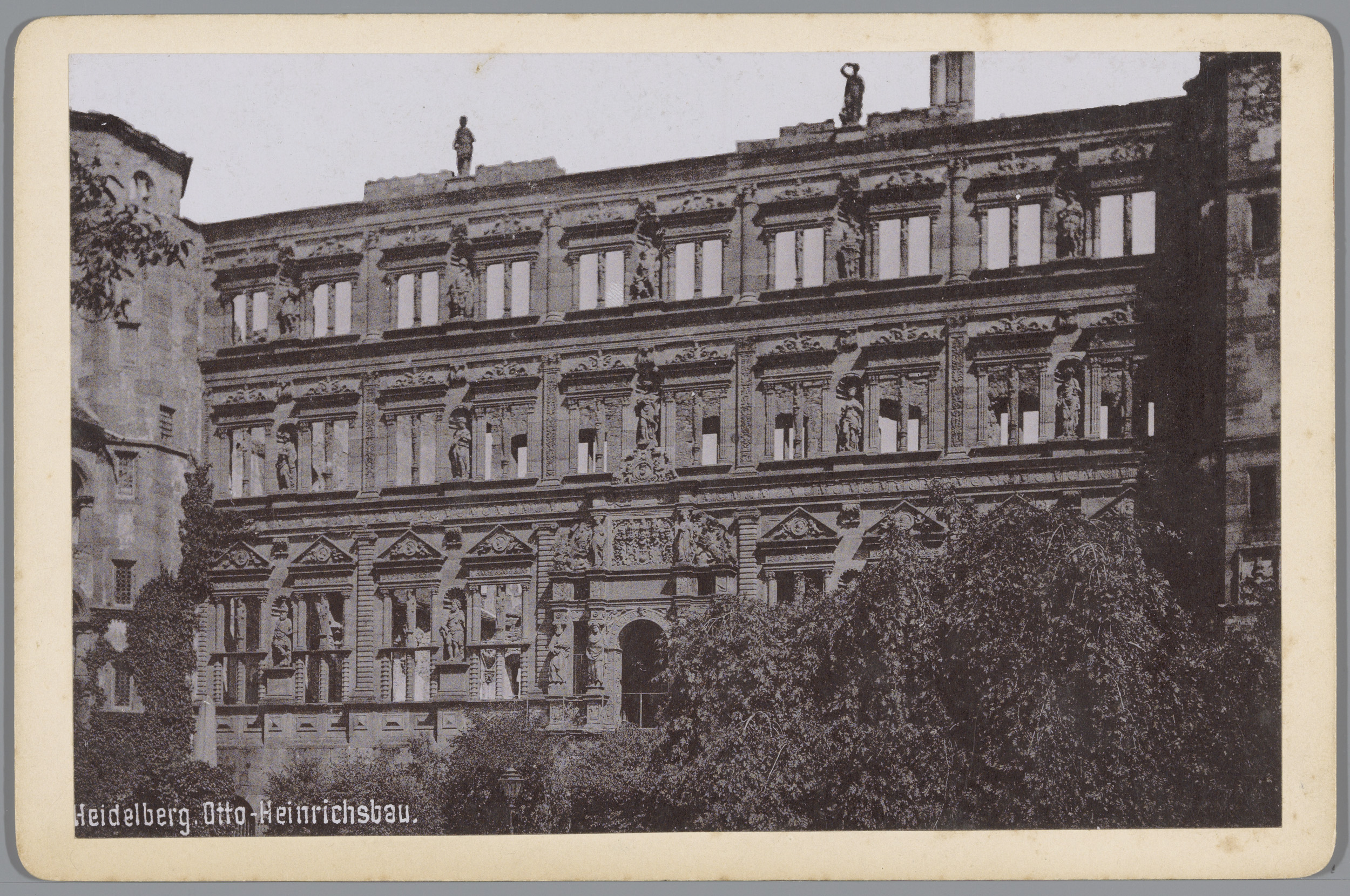
Gezicht op Schloss Ottheinrichsbau in Heidelberg Heidelberg

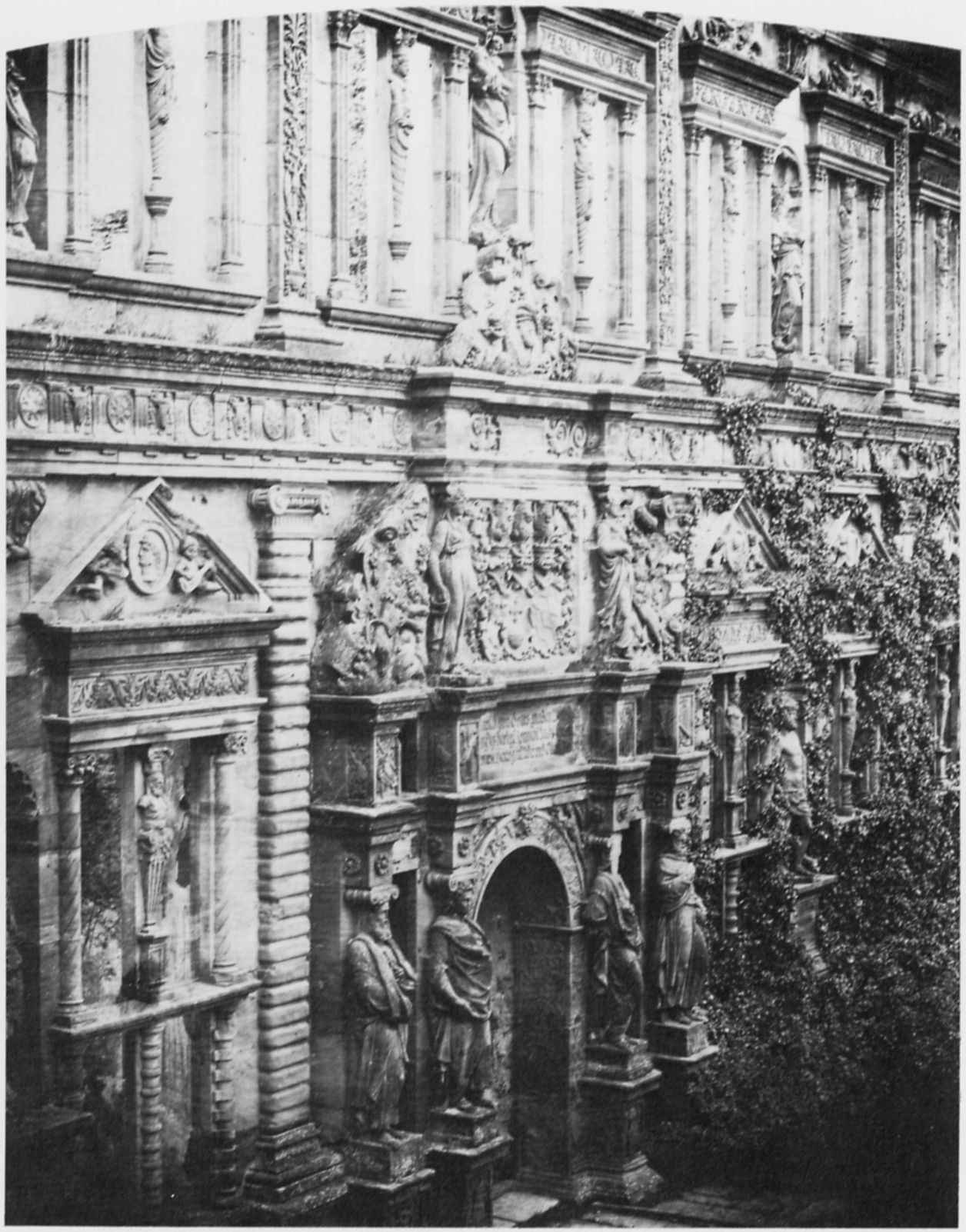
Gebrüder Bisson - Der Ottheinrichsbau des Heidelberger Schlosses

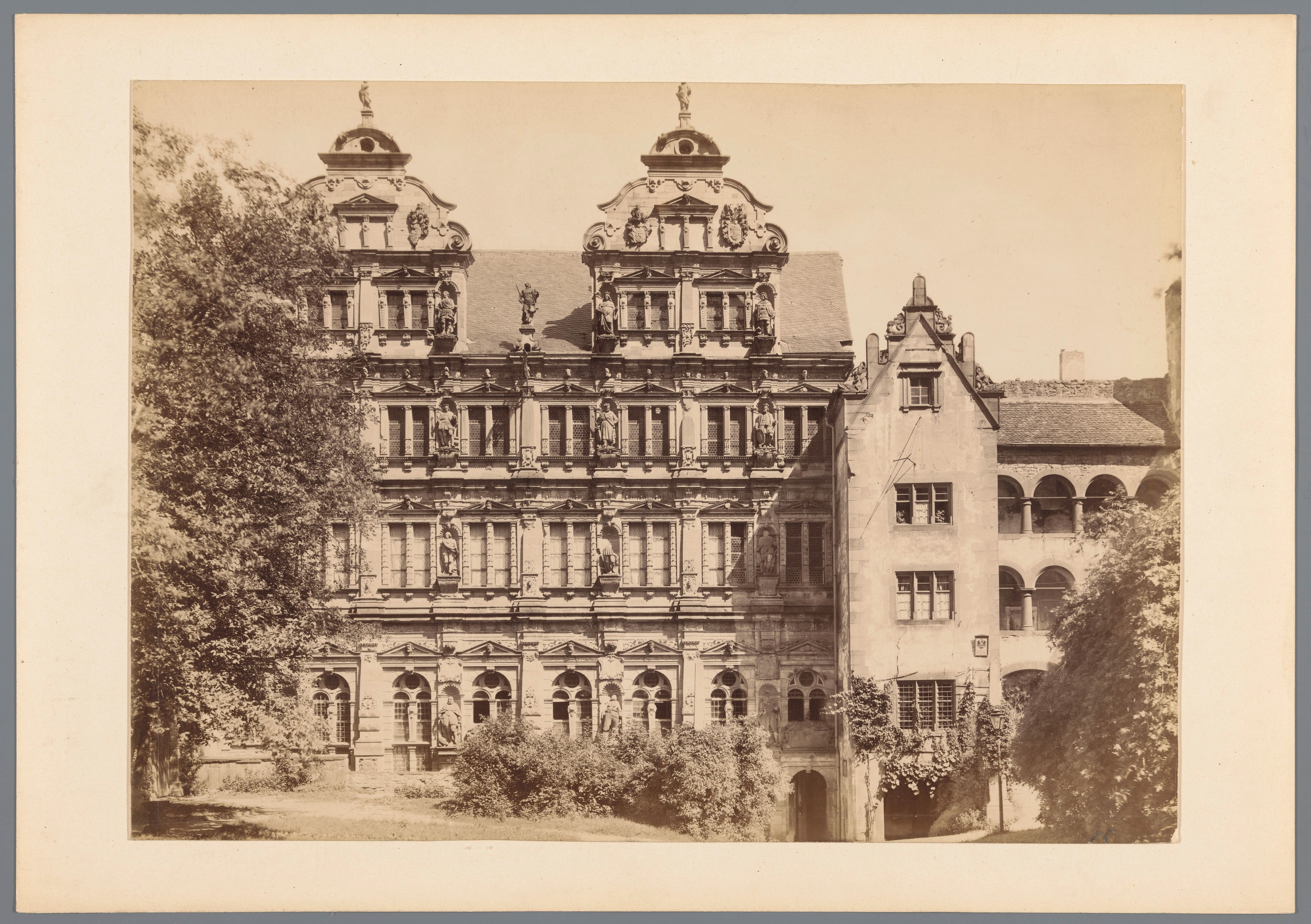
Façade van het Schloss Ottheinrichsbau, onderdeel van Schloss Heidelberg

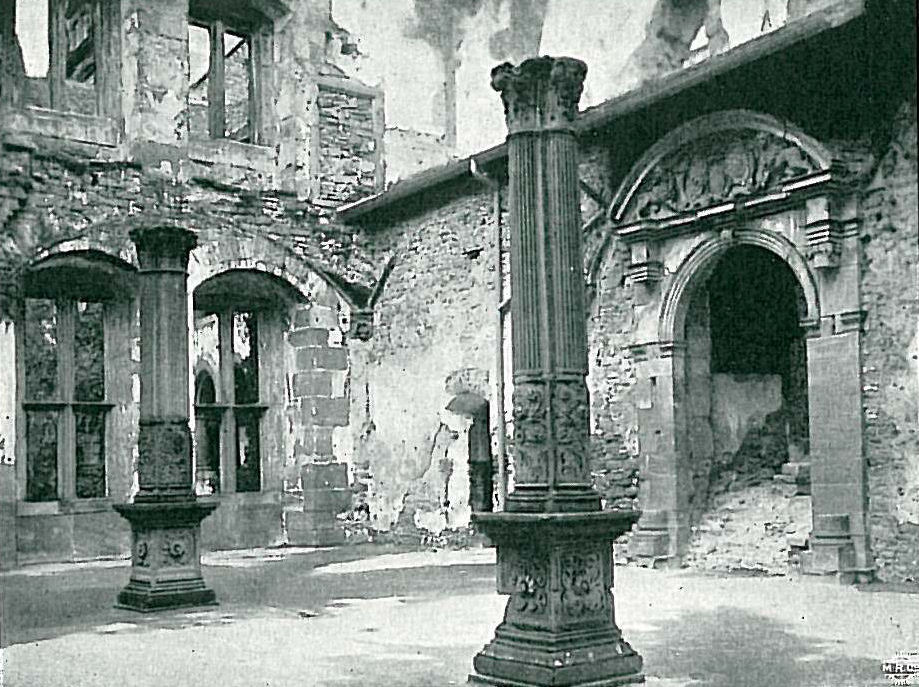
Kaisersaal Otto Heinrichsbau 1895

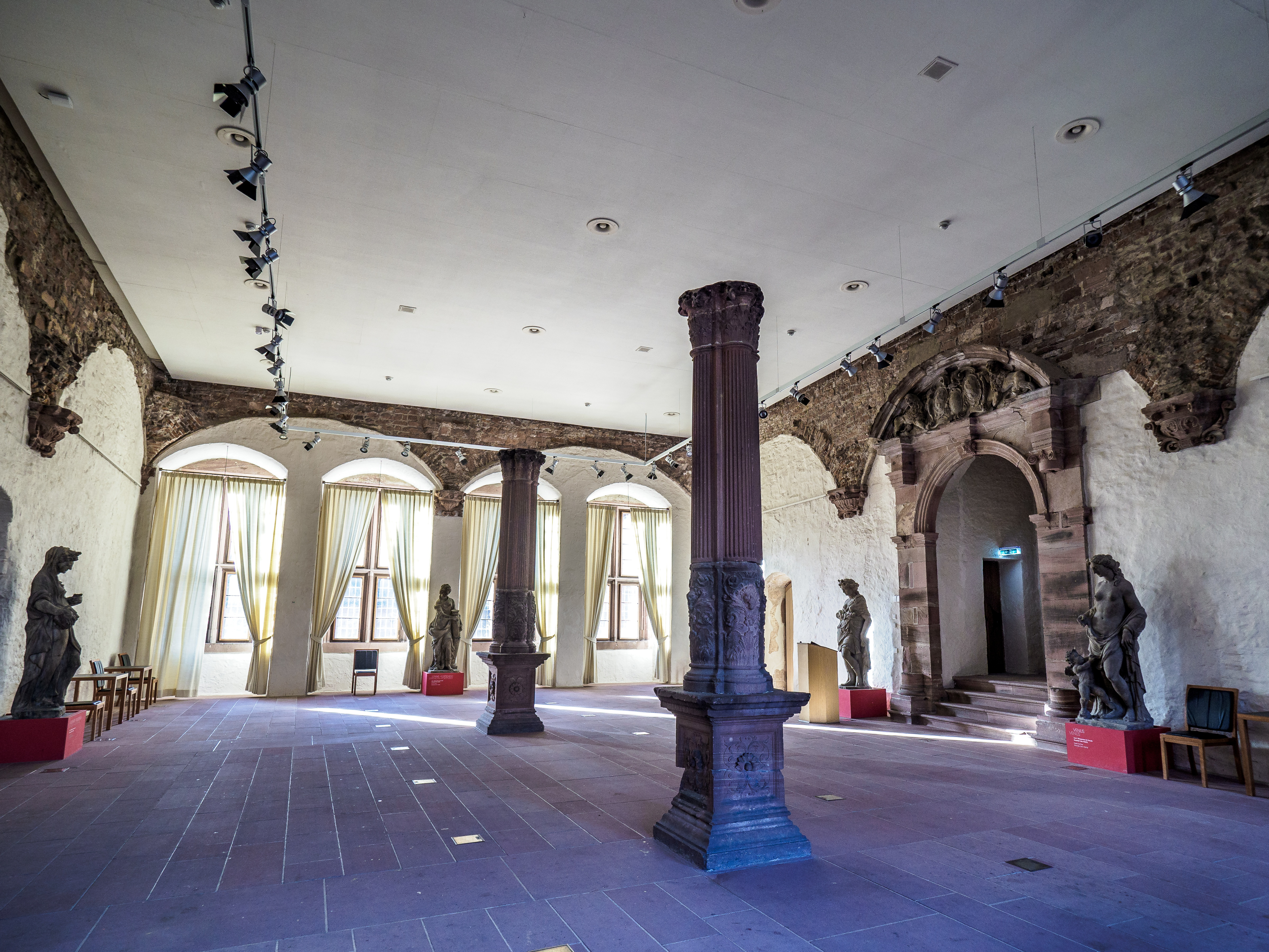
Interior view

==== Torturm, Gate Tower ====
The approach to the forecourt takes you across a stone bridge, over a partially filled-in ditch. The main gate was built in 1528. The original watchhouse was destroyed in the War of the Grand Alliance and replaced in 1718 by a round-arched entrance gate. The gate to the left of the main entrance was closed by means of a drawbridge.

=== Other monuments within the site ===
==== Goethe memorial tablet ====
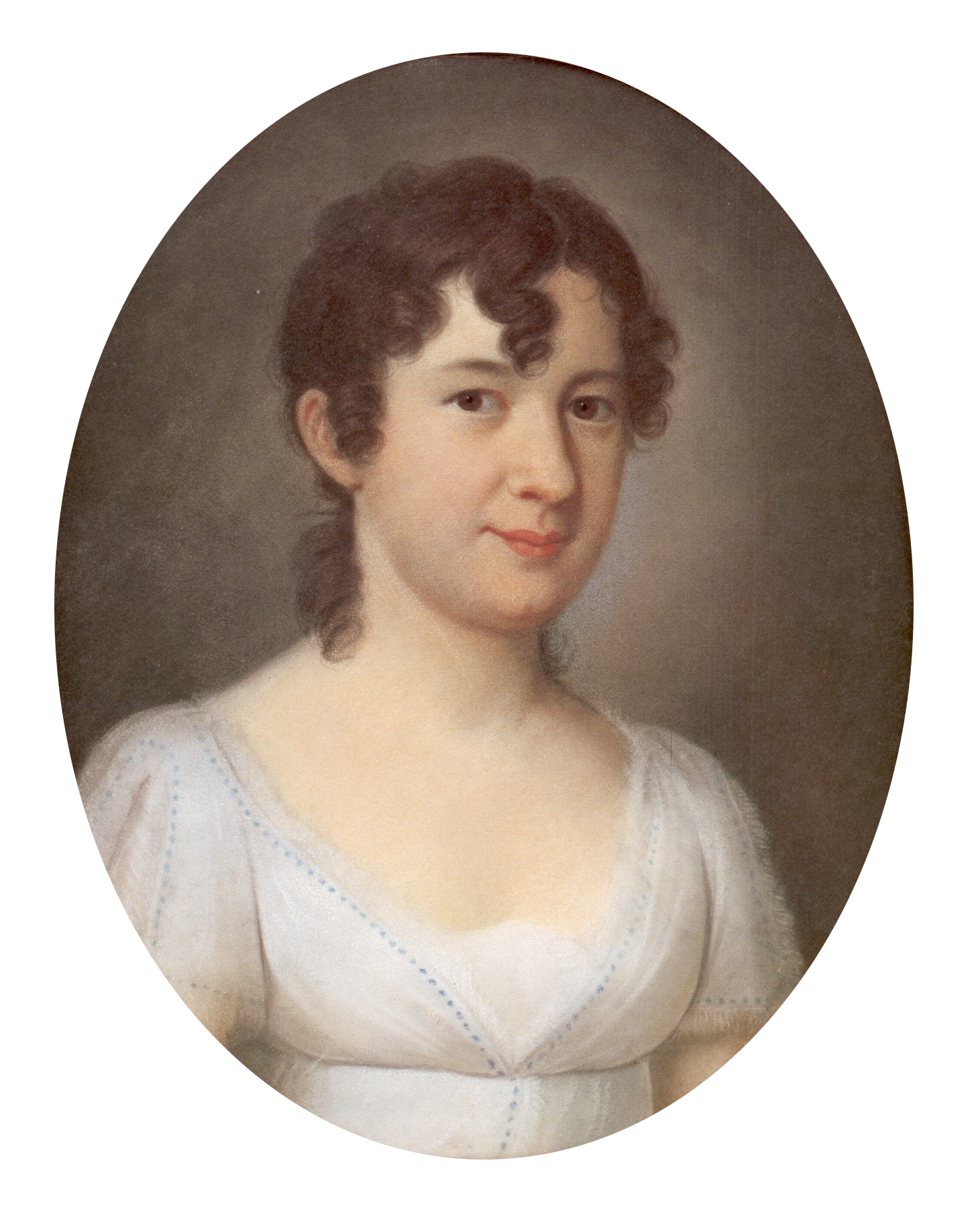
Marianne von Willemer

In 1961 a stone tablet was erected on a ruined wall of the aviary to replace an older tablet. The inscription on the tablet includes verses by Marianne von Willemer reflecting on her last meeting with Johann Wolfgang Goethe written on 28 August 1824, on the occasion of Goethe's 75th birthday.

"On the terrace a high vaulted arch
was once your coming and going
the code pulled from the beloved hand
I found her not, she is no longer to be seen"
...
This poem written by Marianne von Willemer
in remembrance of her last meeting with
Goethe in the Fall of the year 1815

Directly across from the Goethe memorial tablet, stands the Ginkgo tree, from which Goethe gave a leaf to Marianne von Willemer as a symbol of friendship. The poem was published later as "Suleika" in West-östlicher Diwan.

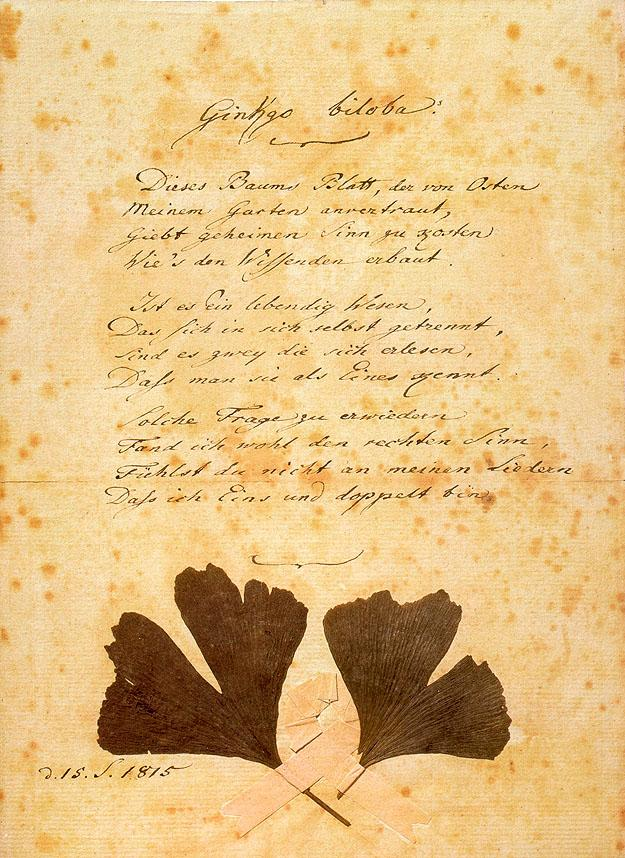
Original text of Goethe

The text of the poem begins:

Ginkgo Biloba

This leaf from a tree in the East,
Has been given to my garden.
It reveals a certain secret,
Which pleases me and thoughtful people.
...

— Johann Wolfgang Goethe

The letter containing this poem with which Goethe included two Ginkgo leaves can be viewed in the Goethe Museum in Düsseldorf. The Ginkgo, planted in 1795, that Goethe lead Marianne von Willemer to in September 1815, is no longer standing today. Since 1928 the Ginkgo tree in the castle garden was labelled that it was "the same tree that inspired Goethe to create his fine poem". The tree was probably still standing in 1936.

==== Harness room ====
The former harness room, originally a coach house, was in reality begun as a fortification. After the Thirty Years War it was used as a stables as well as a toolshed, garage and carriage house.

==== Upper Prince's Fountain ====
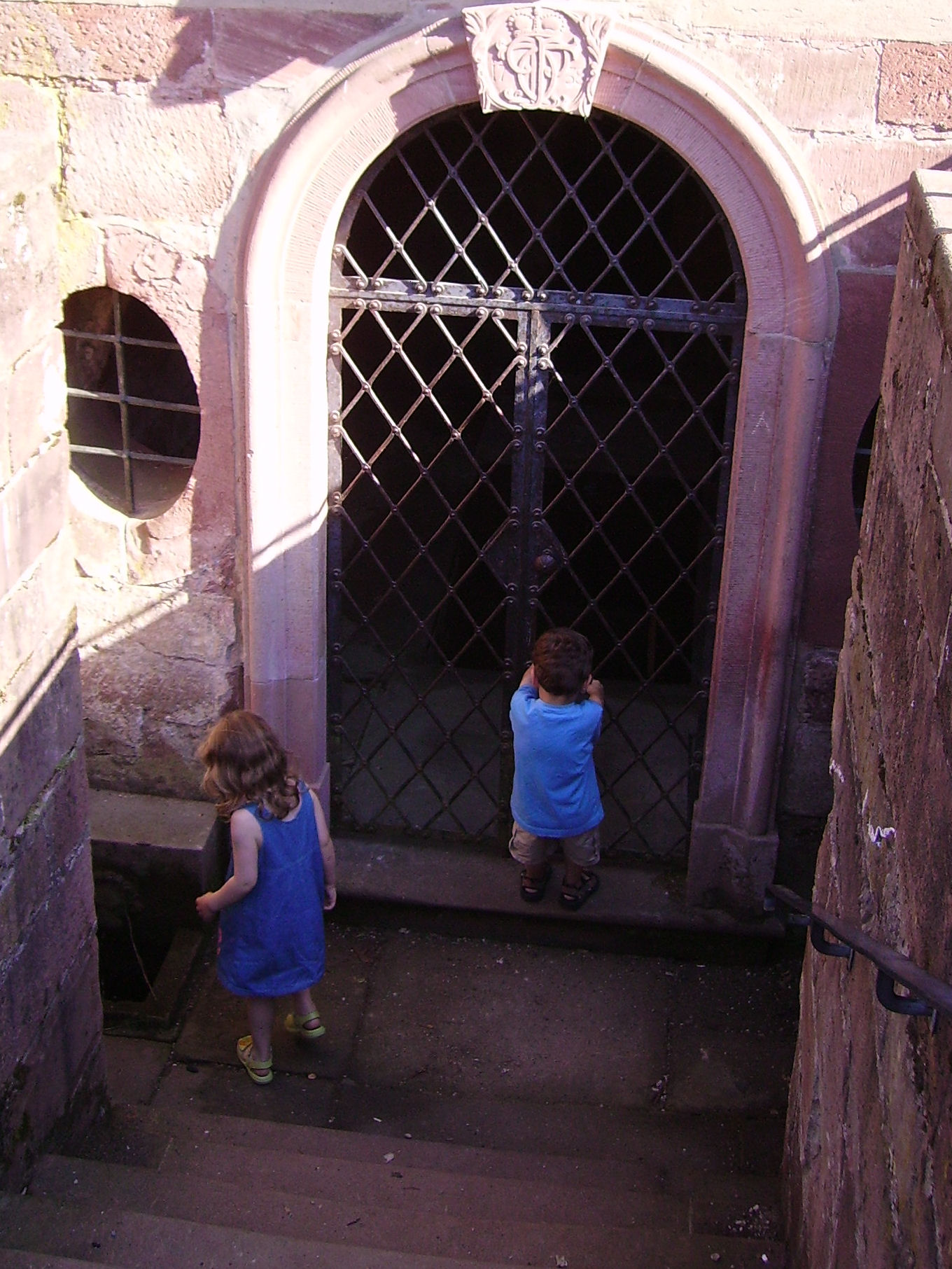
Steps to Upper Prince's Fountain

The Upper Prince's Fountain was designed and built during the reign of Prince Karl Philipp. Over the gate to the fountain house is his monogram with the date 1738 chiseled in the stone. On the right side of the stairway to the fountain is the following inscription:

[DlreCtione] ALeXanDro Blblena CVra et opera HenrICl Neeb Fons hIC PrInCIpaLIs reparat(Vs) PVrIor sCatVrlt
(Translation: This work was undertaken under the oversight of Alessandro Galli da Bibiena and Heinrich Neeb.)

The inscription was a chronogram for the date 1741. Through this fountain and the Lower Prince's Fountain were the water needs of the Prince's residences in Mannheim met until into the 19th century.

In 1798, Johann Andreas von Traitteur recalled this water transport:

Because of a shortage of good, healthy fountain water; whenever the royal household was in Mannheim, the necessary water was brought from the mountain daily. It was well known in which garage was kept the special water wagon, that drove to Heidelberg daily and that brought water out of the Prince's Fountains to the castle.

Quote from Hans Weckesser: "Beloved Water Tower. The History of Mannheim's landmarks"

The water quality in Mannheim was so bad, that upper-class families of the court financed this transport of water from Heidelberg to Mannheim. In the princely residence, until 1777 there was a court position titled "Heidelberg Water-filler".

== Gallery ==
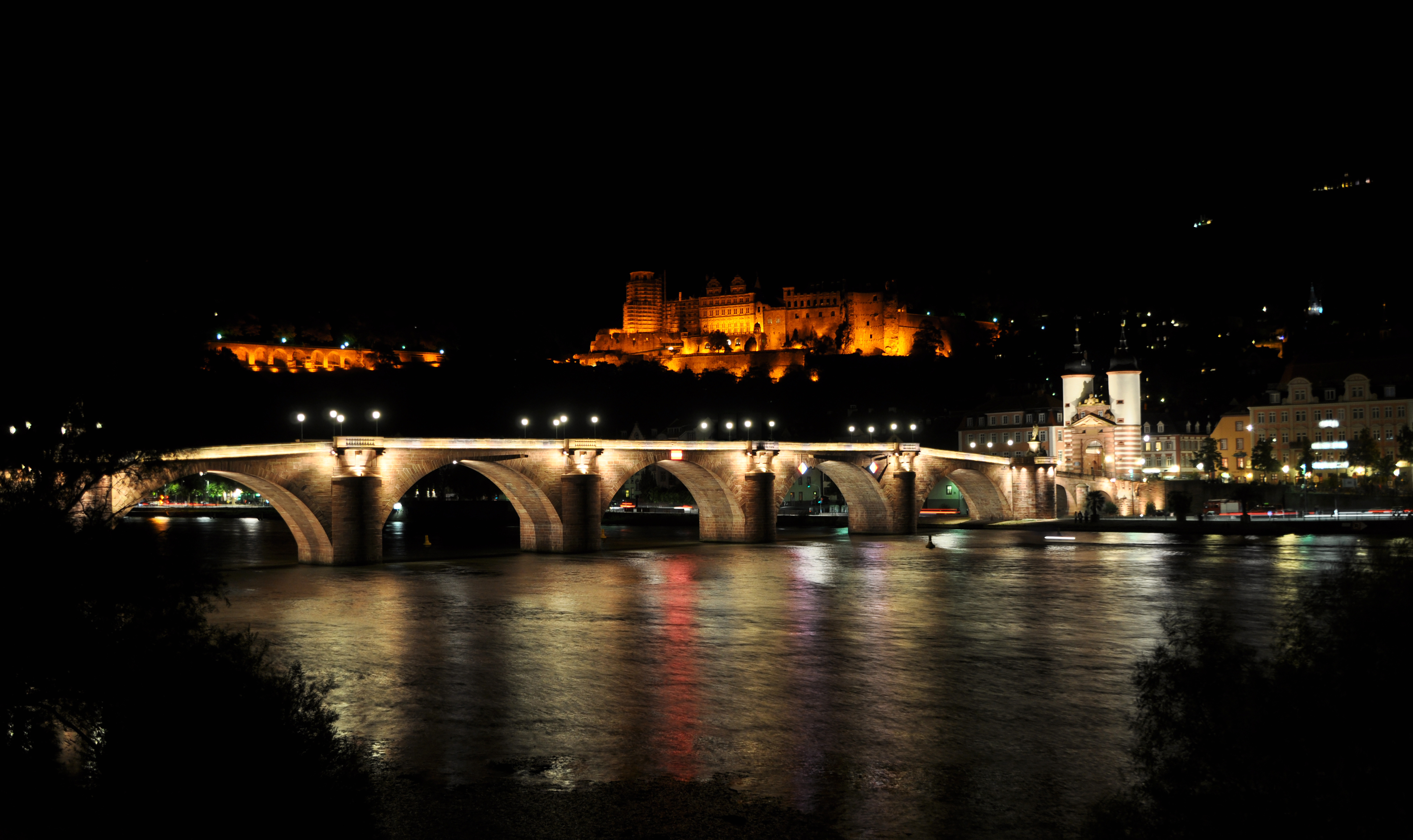
Heidelberg Castle and Old Bridge by night

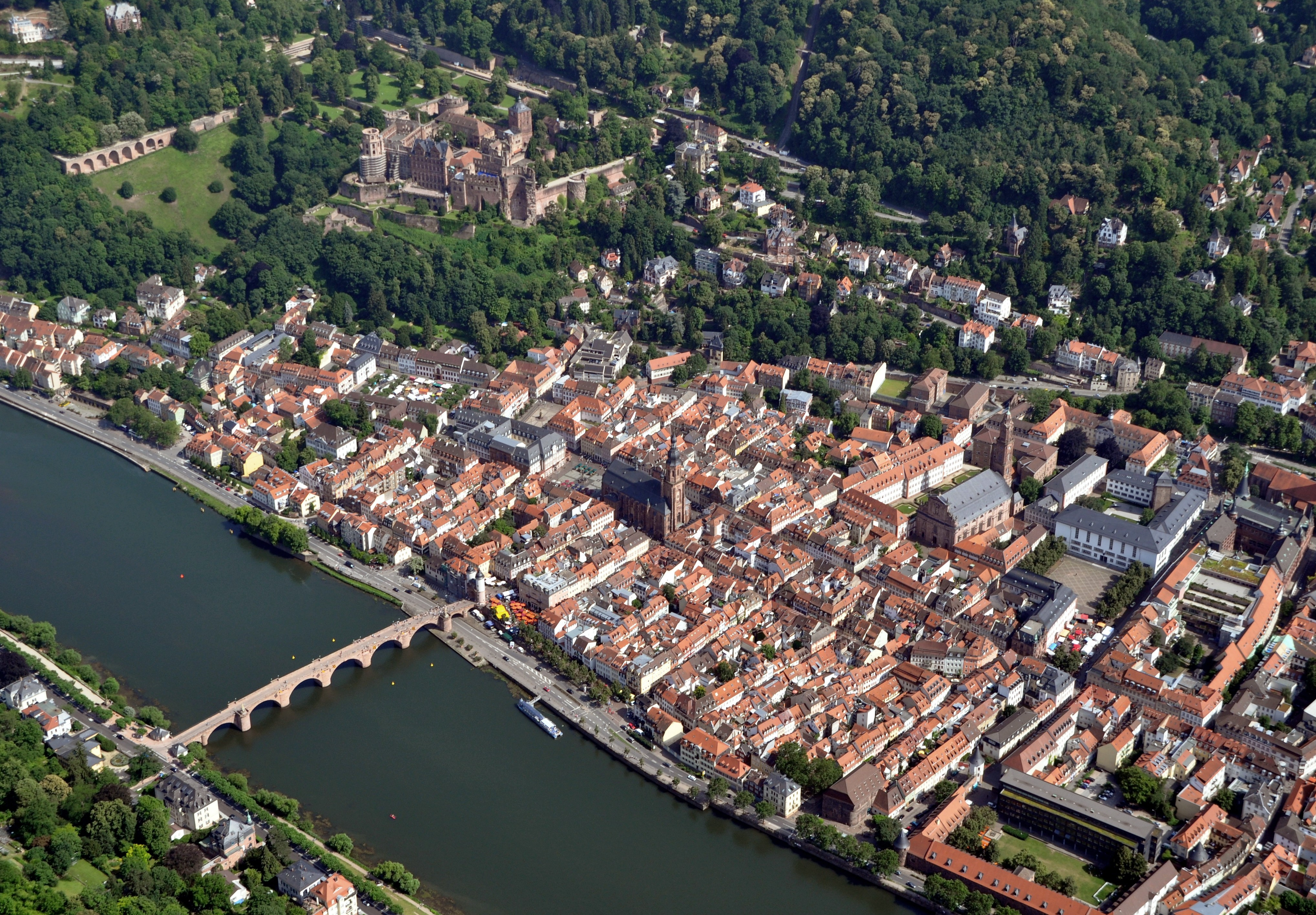
Heidelberg, aerial view of the old town with the Castle

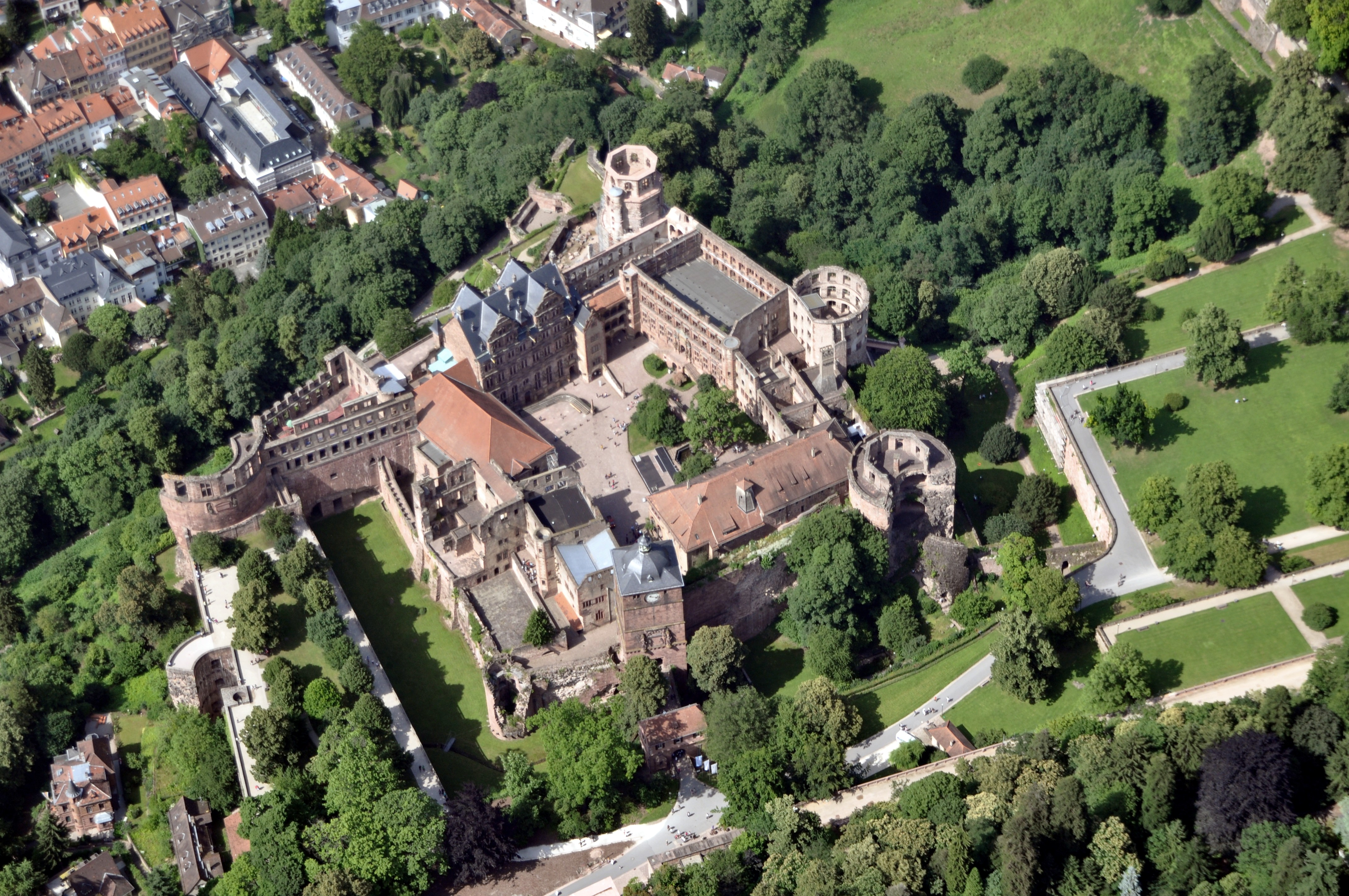
Heidelberg Castle, aerial view of the site

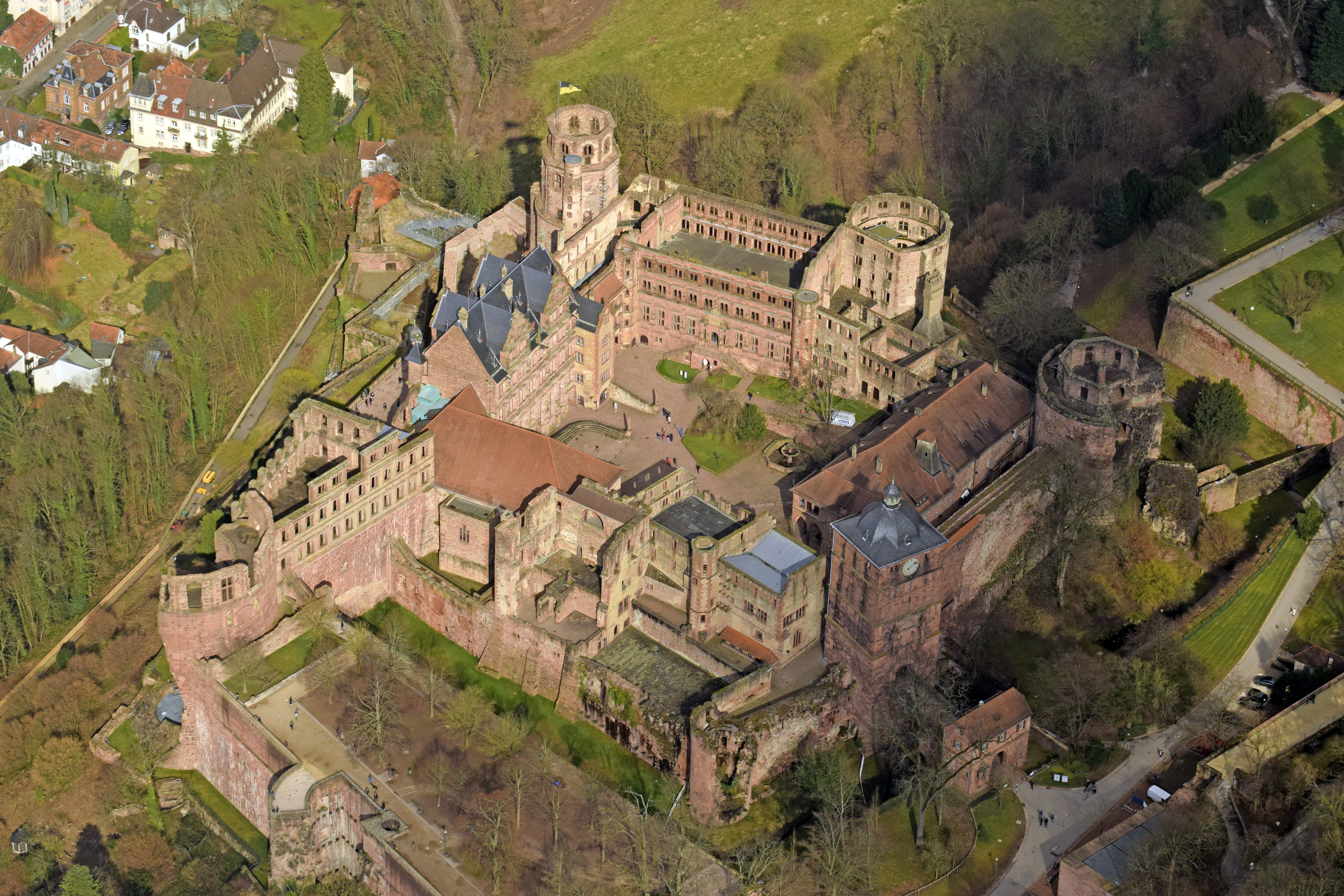
Heidelberg Castle, aerial view of the site

== See also ==
- Hortus Palatinus, the Heidelberg Castle gardens
- Garden à la française
- Heidelberg Tun

== Sources ==
- Roux, Jacob Wilhelm Christian: Six views of Heidelberg and its castle / drawn and engraved by Prof. Roux. Together with a short text by A. Schreiber. Heidelberg: Engelmann, 1826.
- Metzger, Johann: Beschreibung des Heidelberger Schlosses und Gartens : nach gründlichen Untersuchungen und den vorzüglichsten Nachrichten bearbeitet. Heidelberg: Osswald, 1829.
- Metzger, Johann: An historical description of the Castle of Heidelberg and its gardens: composed from careful researches and authentic accounts. Heidelberg: Meder, 1830.
- Chézy, Helmina von: Manual for travellers to Heidelberg and its environs : a guide for foreigners and natives; with an appendix and the panorama of the Heidelberg castle, maps and plans. 3. ed. of the description of Heidelberg, Mannheim etc.. Heidelberg: Engelmann, 1838.
- Richard-Janillon, Vincent [ed.]: Wanderings through the ruins of Heidelberg Castle and its environs. [From the German by H. J. Grainger]. Heidelberg, 1858
- Heidelberger Schlossverein [Hrsg.], Mitteilungen zur Geschichte des Heidelberger Schlosses, 1885–86.
- Woerl, Leo. Woerl's Manuals of Travel. Heidelberg Castle and Neighborhood. Wurzburg [u.a.], 1889.
- Heidelberger Schlossverein [Hrsg.] Mitteilungen zur Geschichte des Heidelberger Schlosses — 3.1896 https://doi.org/10.11588/diglit.2905.11
- Waldschmidt, Wolfram: Altheidelberg und sein Schloß : Kulturbilder aus dem Leben der Pfalzgrafen bei Rhein Jena: Diederich, 1909.
- Sauer, Fritz: Das Heidelberger Schloß im Spiegel der Literatur : eine Studie über die entwicklungsgeschichtlichen Phasen seiner Betrachtungsweise. Heidelberg: Winter, 1910.
- Cohn HJ. The Early Renaissance Court in Heidelberg. European Studies Review. 1971;1(4):295–322. doi:10.1177/026569147100100401
- Baier, Hermann, Heidelberg Castle: A Guide Through Historical Places, 1974.
- Davis, Harry B.: "What Happened in Heidelberg: From Heidelberg Man to the Present". 1977.
- Sauer, Willi: Heidelberg : a guide to town and castle. Heidelberg: von König, 1979
- Hitchcock, Henry Russell: German Renaissance architecture. Princeton, NJ: Princeton Univ. Press, 1981.
- Müller, Jan-Dirk, Der siegreiche Fürst im Entwurf der Gelehrten, in, Buck, Augus (ed.), Höfischer Humanismus, Weinheim 1989.
- Hubach, Hanns: Heidelberg : das Schloss [Engl. Übers.: Philip Mattson]. Heidelberg: Braus, 1995.
- Kühnle, Johannes: Schloss Heidelberg : Geschichte, Architektur, Kuriositäten; Gedichte, Lieder, Impressionen, Rundgang. Leimen (bei Heidelberg): Jk-Multimedia Consult, 2000
- Hoppe Stephan: Die Architektur des Heidelberger Schlosses in der ersten Hälfte des 16. Jahrhunderts. Neue Datierungen und Interpretationen. (online auf ART-Dok) In: Volker Rödel (Red.): Mittelalter. Schloss Heidelberg und die Pfalzgrafschaft bei Rhein bis zur Reformationszeit. (= Schätze aus unseren Schlössern. Band 7). Regensburg 2002, S. 183–190 und S. 205–210. http://archiv.ub.uni-heidelberg.de/artdok/volltexte/2010/994
- Volker Rödel (ed.): Mittelalter. Schloss Heidelberg und die Pfalzgrafschaft bei Rhein bis zur Reformationszeit (=Schätze aus unseren Schlössern, 7). Regensburg 2002.
- Frese, Anette; Hepp, Frieder; Ludwig, Renate, Der Winterkönig, Remshalden 2004.
- Morgan, Luke, Nature as model: Salomon de Caus and early seventeenth-century landscape design, Philadelphia 2007.
- Wiese, Wolfgang: Heidelberg castle. Berlin, München: Dt. Kunstverl., 2009.
- Wacker, Heiko P.: Das Heidelberger Schloss : Burg – Residenz – Denkmal. Ubstadt-Weiher; Heidelberg; Basel: Verl. Regionalkultur, 2012.
- Pape, Burkhard: Das Heidelberger Schloss und seine Befestigungen. Petersberg: Imhof, 2013.
- Hanschke, Julian: Neue Forschungen zur Baugeschichte des Heidelberger Schlosses : Vorabauszug aus dem für 2015 geplanten Abschlussband zu dem am Institut für Baugeschichte (KIT) 2010–2013 durchgeführten Forschungsprojekt. Karlsruhe: KIT, 2014. https://publikationen.bibliothek.kit.edu/1000043430/3245789
- Hanschke, Julian, Schloss Heidelberg: Architektur und Baugeschichte, 2015.
- Wendt, Achim: Schloss Heidelberg. Regensburg: Schnell & Steiner, 2015.
- Mauntel, Christoph; Meyer, Carla; Wendt, Achim (ed.), Heidelberg in Mittelalter und Renaissance, Ostfildern 2017.
- Buselmeier, Michael (ed). Alles will für dich erglühen: das Heidelberger Schloss in Texten und Bildern. Heidelberg: Morio Verlag, 2018.
