= Elisabeth of the Palatinate =

Princess-Abbess of Herford Abbey from 1667 to 1680

Princess Elisabeth
- Princess-Abbess of Herford Abbey
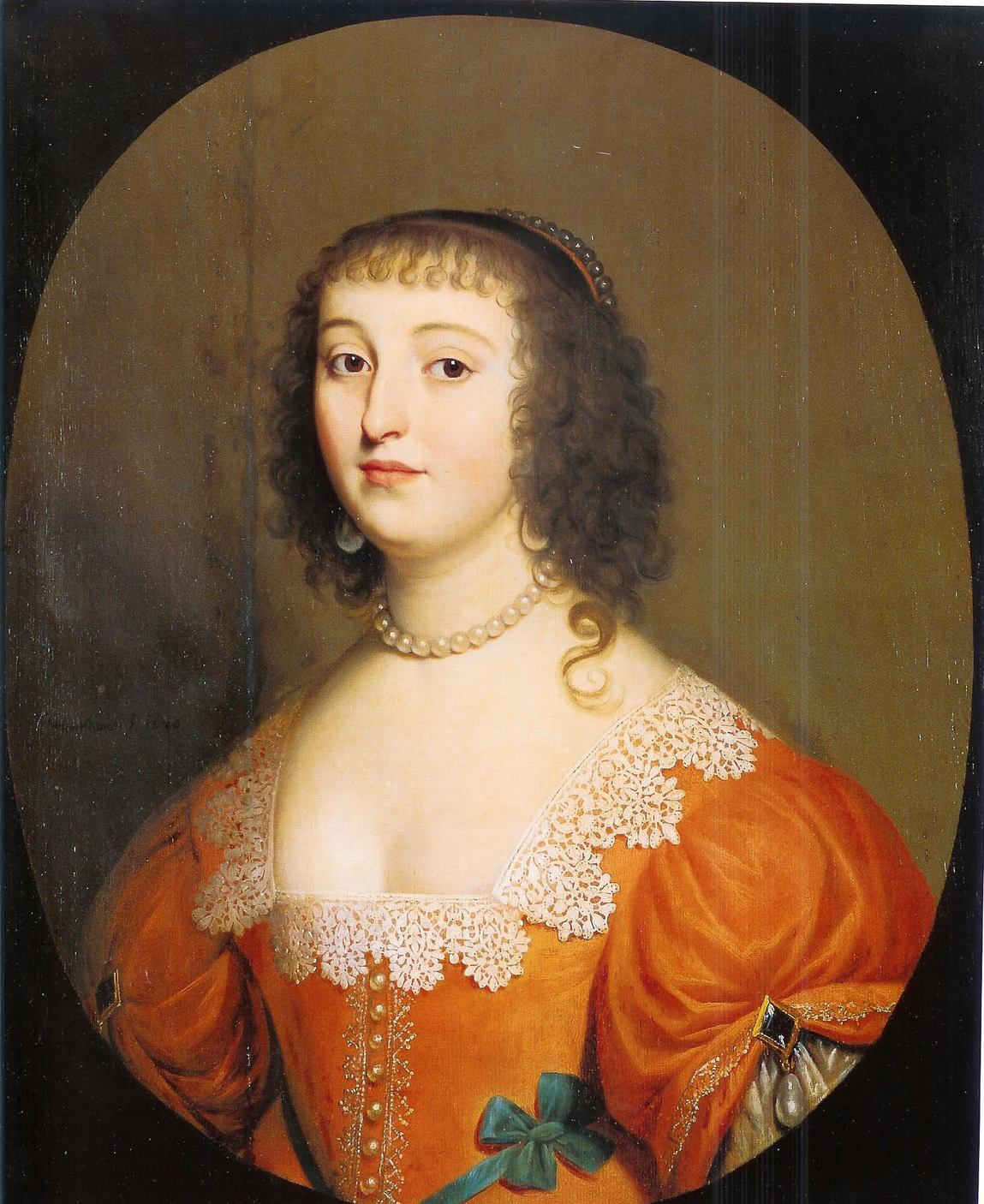
- 1636 portrait by Gerard van Honthorst

Princess-Abbess of Herford Abbey
- Reign: 29 March 1667 – 11 February 1680
- Predecessor: Elizabeth Louise Juliana of Palatinate-Zweibrücken
- Successor: Princess Elisabeth Albertine of Anhalt-Dessau
- Born: 26 December 1618; Heidelberg, Electorate of the Palatinate, Holy Roman Empire
- Died: 11 February 1680 (aged 61); Imperial Abbey of Herford, Holy Roman Empire
- Burial: Herford Abbey
- House: Palatinate-Simmern
- Father: Frederick V, Elector Palatine
- Mother: Elizabeth Stuart
- Religion: Calvinist
- Occupation: Philosopher

Elisabeth of the Palatinate (German: Elisabeth von der Pfalz; 26 December 1618 – 11 February 1680), also known as Elisabeth of Bohemia (Elisabeth von Böhmen), Princess Elisabeth of the Palatinate, or Princess-Abbess of Herford Abbey, was the eldest daughter of Frederick V, Elector Palatine (who was briefly King of Bohemia), and Elizabeth Stuart. Elisabeth of the Palatinate was a philosopher best known for her correspondence with René Descartes. She was critical of Descartes's dualistic metaphysics and her work anticipated the metaphysical concerns of later philosophers.

== Life ==
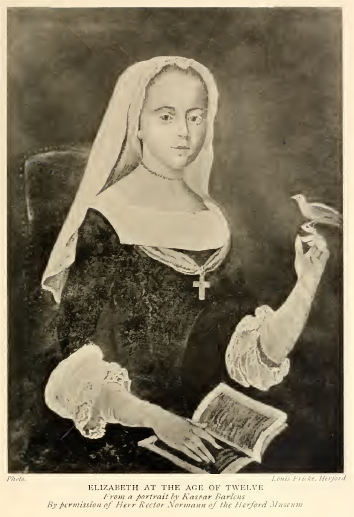
Elisabeth at age 12.

Elisabeth Simmern van Pallandt was born on December 26, 1618, in Heidelberg. She was the third of thirteen children and eldest daughter of Frederick V, Elector Palatine, and Elizabeth Stuart, daughter of James VI of Scotland and I of England and sister of Charles I.

Much of Elisabeth's early life outside of her familial relations is unknown. After a short, unsuccessful reign in Bohemia, Elisabeth's parents were forced into exile in the Netherlands in 1620. Elisabeth stayed with her grandmother Louise Juliana of Nassau in Heidelberg before moving to the Netherlands at the age of nine.

Elisabeth had a wide ranging education, studying philosophy, astronomy, mathematics, jurisprudence, history, modern and classical languages. Her siblings nicknamed her "La Grecque" ("The Greek") based on her skill with the ancient language.

Elisabeth also studied the fine arts including painting, music and dancing. She may have been tutored by Constantijn Huygens.

In 1633, Elisabeth received a proposal of marriage from Władysław IV Vasa, King of Poland. The marriage would have been beneficial to the Palatine fortunes, but the king was a Catholic, and Elisabeth refused to convert from her Protestant faith in order to facilitate the marriage. In her later years, she would boast she had refused a crown because of her devotion to her religion.

Edward Reynolds dedicated his Treatise on the passions and the faculties of the soule of man (1640) to Elisabeth. Although the exact context of the dedication is unknown, the dedication suggests that Elisabeth had seen a draft of the work.

In 1642, Elisabeth read Descartes's Meditations on First Philosophy.

In 1646, Elisabeth's brother Philip killed a man in a duel. Elisabeth was sent to stay with family in Germany where she tried to interest professors in Descartes's work.

In 1660, Elisabeth entered the Lutheran convent at Herford, and in 1667 she became abbess of the convent. While the convent was Lutheran, Elisabeth was a Calvinist. Although the previous abbess (Elisabeth's cousin) had also been a Calvinist, this difference in faith created some initial distrust.

As abbess, she presided over the convent and also governed the surrounding community of 7,000 people. While Elisabeth was abbess, the convent became a refuge from religious persecution for people and she welcomed more marginal religious sects, including the Labadists. When Robert Barclay's father David was imprisoned, Elisabeth intervened and helped to get him released.

Elisabeth died on February 12th, 1680. She was buried in the Abbey Church of Herford.

== Correspondence ==
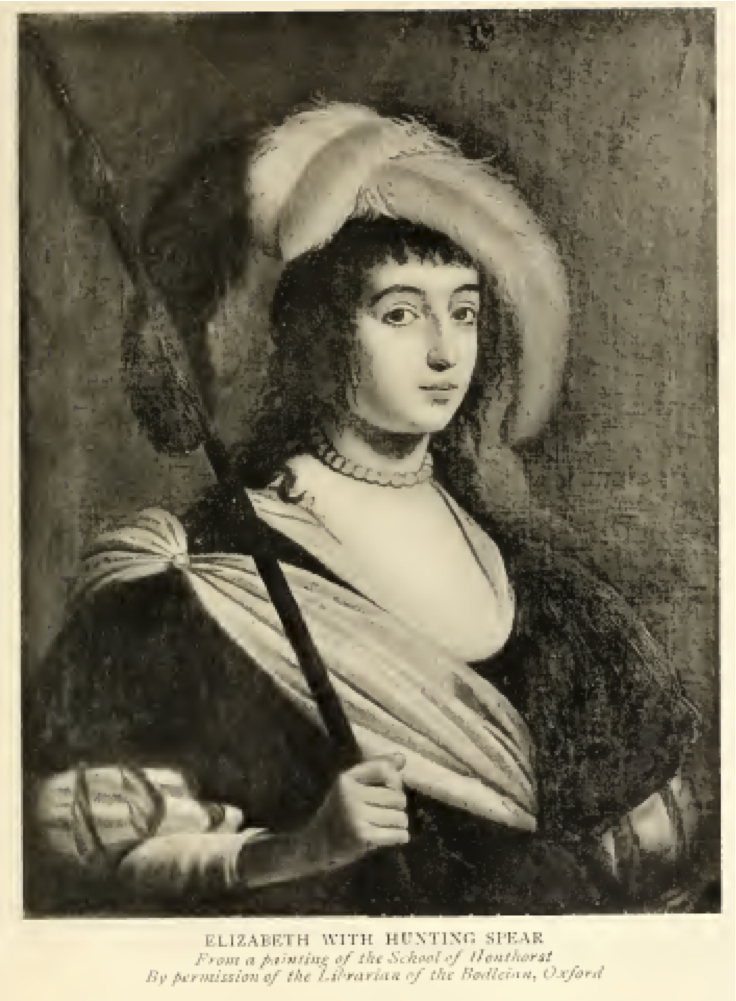
Elisabeth the hunter.

Throughout her adult years, Elisabeth corresponded with many renowned intellectuals of her time.

By 1639, Elisabeth was corresponding with Anna Maria van Schurman, a learned woman, called the Dutch Minerva. In an early letter van Schurman offered Elisabeth guidance on what subjects to study, arguing for the usefulness of history.

Elisabeth's correspondence with Descartes began in 1643 and continued until his death in early 1650. At her request, Descartes became her teacher in philosophy and morals, and in 1644 he dedicated to her his Principia. Descartes greatly respected Elisabeth's intellect and valued his correspondence with her.

Many of Descartes's letters to Elisabeth were published in the volumes of his correspondence edited by Claude Clerselier, but Elisabeth refused the request to publish her side of the exchange. Elisabeth's side of the correspondence was first published in 1879 by Louis-Alexandre Foucher de Careil, after he was alerted to its existence by an antiquarian bookseller, Frederick Müller, who had found a packet of letters in Rosendael.

Elisabeth also corresponded with a number of prominent Quakers, including Robert Barclay and William Penn.

There are letters written both by and to her concerning political and financial matters in the English Calendar of State Papers.

== Family ==
Siblings

1. Henry Frederick, Hereditary Prince of the Palatinate (1614–1629); drowned
2. Charles I Louis, Elector Palatine (1617–1680); married Charlotte of Hesse-Kassel, had issue including Elizabeth Charlotte, Princess Palatine, Duchess of Orleans; Marie Luise von Degenfeld, had issue; Elisabeth Hollander von Bernau, had issue
3. Elisabeth of the Palatinate (1618–1680), the subject of this article, was the third child.
4. Rupert, Count Palatine of the Rhine (1619–1682); had two illegitimate children
5. Maurice of the Palatinate (1620–1652)
6. Louise Hollandine of the Palatinate (18 April 1622 – 11 February 1709)
7. Louis (21 August 1624 – 24 December 1624)
8. Edward, Count Palatine of Simmern (1625–1663); married Anna Gonzaga, had issue
9. Henriette Marie of the Palatinate (7 July 1626 – 18 September 1651); married Sigismund Rákóczi, brother of the Prince of Transylvania, on 16 June 1651
10. John Philip Frederick of the Palatinate Frederick (26 September 1627 – 16 February 1650); also reported to have been born on 15 September 1629
11. Charlotte of the Palatinate (19 December 1628 – 14 January 1631)
12. Sophia, Electress of Hanover (14 October 1630 – 8 June 1714); married Ernest Augustus, Elector of Hanover, had issue, including King George I of Great Britain. Many other royal families are Sophia's descendants. Sophia came close to ascending to the British throne, but died two months before Queen Anne.
13. Gustavus Adolphus of the Palatinate (14 January 1632 – 1641)

== Contributions to philosophy: Descartes and other prominent figures ==
Elisabeth met Descartes on one of his visits to The Hague. Descartes visited The Hague to meet some of the leading intellectual figures in the Netherlands who might support his philosophy. The Hague was often a gathering place to meet other influential, powerful people. As Descartes talked of his ideas, Elisabeth intently listened and became very interested in Descartes's thoughts of the mind and body. After his visit, it was told to him that Elisabeth had been very interested in his work. Descartes was flattered and told others that he would like to get to know the princess better. Descartes made another visit to The Hague, and was intent on having a conversation with Elisabeth, although this conversation for some reason did not happen.

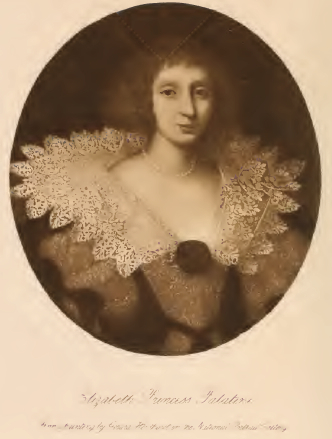
Portrait of Elisabeth from the National Gallery.

Elisabeth, upon hearing of Descartes's failed attempt to converse with her, wrote Descartes a letter. In this letter, dated May 6, 1643, Elisabeth writes, "tell me please how the soul of a human being (it being only a thinking substance) can determine the bodily spirits and so bring about voluntary actions". Elisabeth is questioning Descartes's idea of dualism and how the soul and the body could interact. Elisabeth questioned how something immaterial (Descartes's idea of the mind) could move something material (the body). She proposes three ways something can be "moved": through self-propulsion, external propulsion, or movement determined by the properties of something pushing it. The first and second options require physical contact, while the third option requires extension. If the mind is not part of the physical world, then it cannot make physical contact with anything, meaning the mind cannot interact with the body. By Descartes's own view, physical interaction is only possible through extension, but as Descartes thinks the mind lacks this property, it makes interaction impossible, ruling out the third option as well. Descartes replied to Elisabeth's letter with the answer that this interaction should not be thought of as between two bodies and that it is the kind of union that exists between the two qualities of heaviness and bodies.

Elisabeth was not satisfied with this answer, so she wrote to Descartes again. In this letter, dated June 20, 1643, Elisabeth writes that she cannot "understand the idea through which we must judge how the soul (nonextended and immaterial) is able to move the body, that is, by that idea through which you have at another time understood heaviness ... And I admit that it would be easier for me to concede matter and extension to the mind than it would be for me to concede the capacity to move a body and be moved by one to an immaterial thing." Jaegwon Kim cites this as the first causal argument for the doctrine of physicalism in philosophy of mind. In another letter from Elisabeth to Descartes dated July 1, 1643, Elisabeth agrees with Descartes that our senses are evidence that the soul does move the body and the body moves the soul, but that this interaction does not teach us anything about how this happens. In Elisabeth's correspondence with Descartes, we can see that Elisabeth assumes that Descartes does have an account of how the soul and body interact and asks for clarification on how the soul does this. In fact, Descartes did not have an exact account of how this happens, but merely assumed the soul had this capability. This particular correspondence between Descartes and Elisabeth ended with this July 1 letter.

The correspondence began again, but two years later. In this correspondence, Elisabeth and Descartes discuss an illness Elisabeth suffered from in the summer of 1645. Descartes writes to Elisabeth that he thinks her symptoms are caused by sadness. This could very well have been true, as Elisabeth's brother Philip had challenged a family suitor and then stabbed the suitor in public, resulting in social backlash. This caused Elisabeth much distress and worry. Elisabeth originally intended the letters to be private and has no extant philosophical works. This makes her place in the history of philosophy complex and the subject of debate. This specific correspondence between Elisabeth and Descartes is often ignored by many historians, as they see it as insignificant, but a few regard it as influential in that Descartes and Elisabeth seem to be talking of the "passions of the soul", as Descartes referred to them. Some historians have remarked that Elisabeth could have been a philosopher in her own right if it had not been for a lack of a systematic presentation of her philosophical position.

In addition to Descartes, Elisabeth held correspondence with many others, including Presbyterian and Puritan Divine Edward Reynolds and various Quakers. Among them most notably were Nicholas Malebranche, Gottfried Wilhelm Leibniz, Robert Barclay, and William Penn. While they seemed to have the aim of converting her to their faith, Elisabeth seemed to be focused on the intellectual interest of their ideals and beliefs. She also held a correspondence for a time with the "Dutch Minerva", Anna Maria van Schurman, who encouraged Elisabeth to further her studies in history, physics, and astronomy. While their correspondence was not extensive, Van Schurman was a mentor to Elisabeth and guided her in her scholarly studies. She was respected and revered by Princess Elisabeth to a great degree. Elisabeth asked for her advice on new topics and subjects of study often. Van Schurman took the initiative in giving Elisabeth her opinion on the new discoveries of their time. The area in which they seemed to diverge was in their opinion of Descartes. Elisabeth was intrigued by the new Cartesian philosophy and wanted to learn more about it. Van Schurman, however, emphatically refuted the idea when Elisabeth inquired about it, instead defending the scholastic traditional view. As much as she respected Van Schurman, this did not stop Elisabeth from pursuing her interest in Descartes and his doctrine. It has been speculated that Elisabeth's correspondence and deep connection with Descartes effectively ended her communications with Van Schurman.

== Contributions to the feminist history of philosophy ==
Elisabeth of Bohemia has been a key subject in the feminist history of philosophy. She has garnered attention as a prominent female thinker and for her practical role in the development of 17th century female scholars. Feminist scholars study her correspondences and life to understand the limitations placed on 17th century female thinkers. Some scholars cite Elisabeth as an example of how philosophical conceptions of women as philosophers excluded them from the philosophical canon. For feminist scholars, her correspondence with Descartes presents an example of the value of including women in the canon. Some argue that Elisabeth's correspondence with Descartes helps feminist scholars re-conceptualize how women are to be included in the philosophical canon. Feminist scholars are concerned with how Elisabeth's gender informed her philosophy. Many believe that Elisabeth was keenly aware of the limitations of her sex. One scholar states that Elisabeth's health and femininity informed her interest about the immaterial soul's influence on the material body. Elisabeth's influence also extends to the development of other 17th century female thinkers. She utilized her exile court in The Hague to create a network of female scholars. Her network was a space where women could engage in philosophical inquiry through correspondence. Including Elisabeth, the network consisted of Anna Maria van Schurman, Marie de Gournay, and Lady Ranelagh.

Regnal titles
Preceded by Elizabeth II	Princess-Abbess of Herford; 1667–1680	Succeeded by Elizabeth IV
