= Philip Frederick of the Palatinate =

German noble (1627–1650)

Prince Philip Frederick
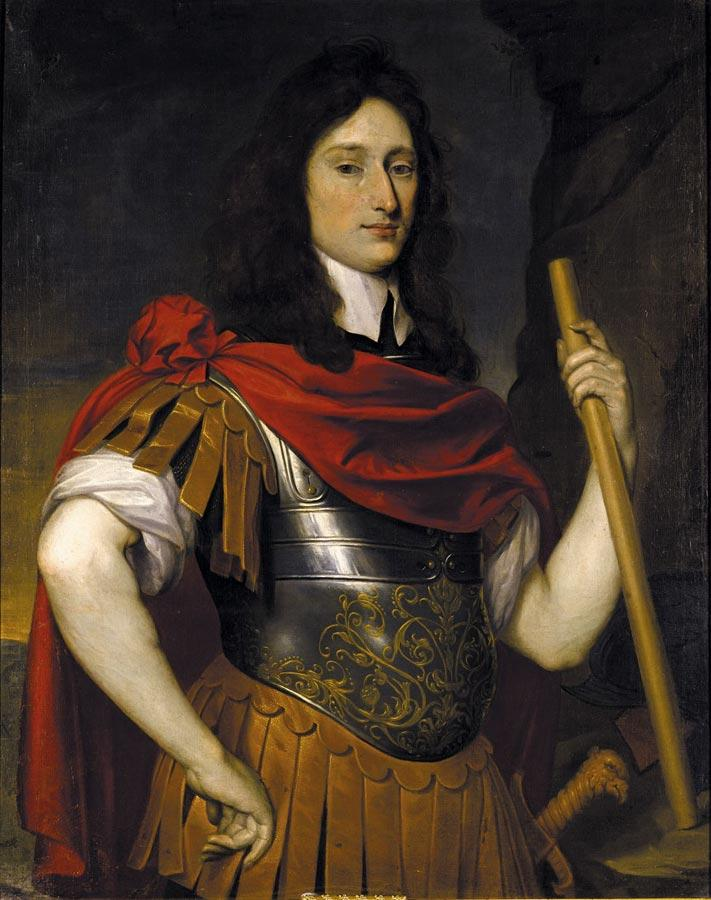
- Prince Philip of the Palatinate, as a Roman emperor.
- Born: 16 September 1627; The Hague, Dutch Republic
- Died: 16 December 1650 (aged 23); Rethel, Kingdom of France
- Burial: Church of St. Charles Borromeo, Sedan
- House: Palatinate-Simmern
- Father: Frederick V, Elector Palatine
- Mother: Elizabeth Stuart
- Religion: Protestant

John Philip Frederick of the Palatinate (16 September 1627 – 16 December 1650), was the seventh son of Frederick V, Elector Palatine (of the House of Wittelsbach), the "Winter King" of Bohemia, by his consort, Elizabeth of Bohemia.

== Early years ==
Prince Philip was born in The Hague, where his parents lived in exile after his father lost the Battle of White Mountain and was driven from the thrones of both Bohemia and the Palatinate. He was their 10th-born child and the sixth son. Philip's father, a Calvinist, died on 29 November 1632, when Philip was five years old.

Through his mother, Elizabeth of Bohemia, Philip was a grand-son of James VI and I, King of Scotland, England, and Ireland, and a nephew of Charles I.

While his elder brother Rupert was heavily involved in British politics and wars, Philip and his older brother Edward were educated at the French court, at the request of their eldest brother, Charles I Louis. Philip and Edward were sent back to The Hague by request of their mother after the French temporarily took Charles Louis prisoner.

== Scandal and exile ==
On the night of June 20, 1646, Prince Philip killed a French exile, Lieutenant Colonel Jacques de l'Epinay, Sieur de Vaux, in a duel or fight. Rumours declared that Prince Philip had been provoked by a boast of the French Don Juan that he had enjoyed the favours not only of Philip's older sister, the Princess Louise, but also of their widowed mother.

In spite of repeated summonses, Prince Philip never appeared to answer the Dutch legal authorities. He became what Elizabeth had sworn that none of her sons should become - a soldier of fortune.

== Military career and death ==
Philip entered the military service of the Duke of Lorraine with the rank of colonel. He was killed at the Battle of Rethel on 16 December 1650, during the Fronde. His remains were returned to Sedan and were buried in the Church of St. Charles Borromeo.

== Ancestry ==
Ancestors of Philip Frederick of the Palatinate

16. Frederick III, Elector Palatine
8. Louis VI, Elector Palatine
17. Marie of Brandenburg-Kulmbach
4. Frederick IV, Elector Palatine
18. Philip I, Landgrave of Hesse
9. Elisabeth of Hesse
19. Christine of Saxony
2. Frederick V, Elector Palatine
20. William I, Count of Nassau-Siegen
10. William the Silent
21. Juliana of Stolberg-Werningerode
5. Louise Juliana of Nassau
22. Louis III de Bourbon, Duke of Montpensier
11. Charlotte of Bourbon-Montpensier
23. Jacqueline de Longwy
1. Philip Frederick of the Palatinate
24. Matthew Stewart, 4th Earl of Lennox
12. Henry Stuart, Lord Darnley
25. Margaret Douglas
6. James I of England
26. James V of Scotland
13. Mary Stuart, Queen of Scotland
27. Mary of Guise
3. Elizabeth Stuart
28. Christian III of Denmark
14. Frederick II of Denmark
29. Dorothea of Saxe-Lauenburg
7. Anne of Denmark
30. Ulrich III of Mecklenburg-Güstrow
15. Sophie of Mecklenburg-Güstrow
31. Elizabeth of Denmark

== Bibliography ==
- Johann Michael von Söltl: Der Religionskrieg in Deutschland, Band 2, J. A. Meissner, 1840, S. 401 ff. (in German)
- Carl Eduard Vehse: Geschichte der deutschen Höfe seit der Reformation: 4. Abth., Geschichte der Höfe der Häuser Baiern, Würtemberg, Baden und Hessen; 2. Th, Band 24, Hoffmann und Campe, 1853, S. 101 (in German)
