= Jessie Bedford =

British writer

- Born: 15 February 1853; Twyford
- Died: 22 May 1918 (aged 65); Southampton
- Occupation: Novelist

Jessie Bedford (1853–1918) was a British novelist who wrote about ten novels under the name of Elizabeth Godfrey. She wrote about the Stuarts, German history and a biography of the German philosopher Elisabeth of the Palatinate.

== Life ==
Bedford was born in 1853 near Winchester in the village of Twyford. Her mother was Emma (born Poulden) who was the second wife of Revd James Gover Bedford who had children from his first marriage. Her early writing was for Temple Bar and Macmillan's Magazine in the early 1890s. In 1892 she took the nom-de-plume of Elizabeth Godfrey to write a three volume novel titled Twixt Wood and Sea. In 1895 she a book which was like one by Thomas Hardy when she published a "pleasant piece of work". It was called Cornish Diamonds in which a contemporary heroine has to choose between following her talents or her love. Her next book was a "musical novel" titled Poor Human Nature in 1898 which concerned opera singers in a German town. In the following year she published A Stolen Idea: A Novel. This book is about a woman who marries a writer she admires and has plagiarised.

Bedford established friends in the literary world who included the poet Algernon Charles Swinburne and his supporter the poetry critic Theodore Watts-Dunton and Mary St Leger Kingsley who wrote under the name of Lucas Malet.

Her style changed and from stories about contemporary women she began to write about the seventeenth century. In 1903 and 1904 she published two books titled Home Life under the Stuarts, 1603–49 and Social Life under the Stuarts. Three years later, she revealed her own research in English Children in the Olden Times which was an original look at the history of young children.

In 1906 she published a book about Heidelberg and in 1909 came A Sister of Prince Rupert a biography of the German philosopher Elisabeth of the Palatinate. Elisabeth of the Palatinate was a princess, an abbess and a correspondent of René Descartes. Bedford's last book was about the New Forest where she lived.

Bedford lived in Bournemouth and previously Brockenhurst and she died in a nursing home in Southampton.
