= Gustavus Adolphus of the Palatinate =

German noble (1632–1641)

Prince Gustavus Adolphus
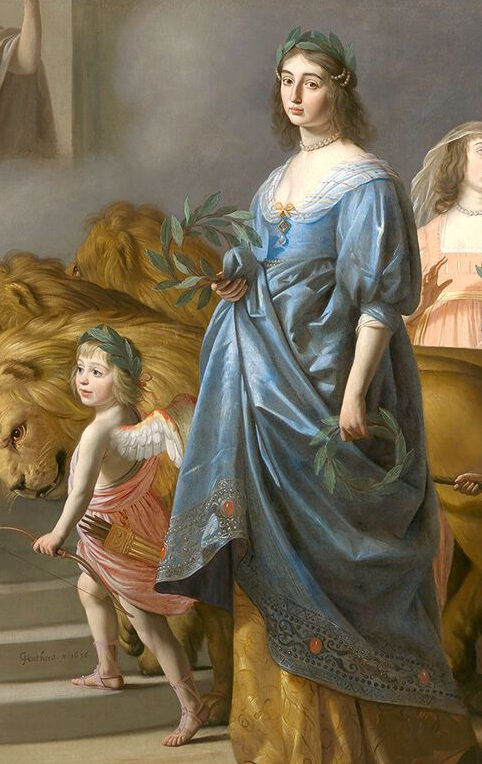
- Prince Gustavus (left), with his oldest sister, Elisabeth of the Palatinate (right) by Gerard van Honthorst.
- Born: 14 January 1632; The Hague, Dutch Republic
- Died: 9 January 1641 (aged 8); The Hague, Dutch Republic
- Burial: Kloosterkerk
- House: Palatinate-Simmern
- Father: Frederick V of the Palatinate
- Mother: Elizabeth Stuart
- Religion: Protestant

Gustavus Adolphus of the Palatinate (Prince Palatine Gustavus Adolphus; 14 January 1632 – 9 January 1641), was the last son of Elector Frederick V of the Palatinate (of the House of Wittelsbach), the "Winter King" of Bohemia, by his consort, the Scottish princess Elizabeth Stuart. Gustavus was born in the Dutch Republic, where his family had sought refuge after the sequestration of the Electorate during the Thirty Years' War. Gustavus's brother Charles I Louis was, as part of the Peace of Westphalia, restored to the Palatinate.

== Biography ==
Prince Gustavus was born in The Hague, where his parents lived in exile after his father lost the Battle of White Mountain and was driven from the thrones of both Bohemia and the Palatinate. He was named after King Gustavus Adolphus of Sweden, a close friend of both his parents. His paternal grandparents were Frederick IV and of Louise Juliana of Nassau and his maternal grandparents were James VI and I and Anne of Denmark. His father, a Calvinist, died on 29 November 1632, when Gustavus was a baby.

Gustavus died of epilepsy on 9 January 1641, at 8 years of age.

== Ancestry ==
Ancestors of Gustavus Adolphus of the Palatinate

8. Louis VI, Elector Palatine
4. Frederick IV, Elector Palatine
9. Elisabeth of Hesse
2. Frederick V of the Palatinate
10. William the Silent
5. Louise Juliana of Nassau
11. Charlotte of Bourbon-Montpensier
1. Gustavus Adolphus of the Palatinate
12. Henry Stuart, Lord Darnley
6. James VI and I of Scotland and England
13. Mary, Queen of Scots
3. Elizabeth Stuart
14. Frederick II of Denmark
7. Anne of Denmark
15. Sophie of Mecklenburg-Güstrow

== Bibliography ==
- Carl Eduard Vehse: Geschichte der deutschen Höfe seit der Reformation: 4. Abth., Geschichte der Höfe der Häuser Baiern, Würtemberg, Baden und Hessen; 2. Th, Band 24, Hoffmann und Campe, 1853, S. 101 (in German)
