= Henriette Marie of the Palatinate =

Princess of Bohemia and German noble (1626–1651)

Princess Henrietta
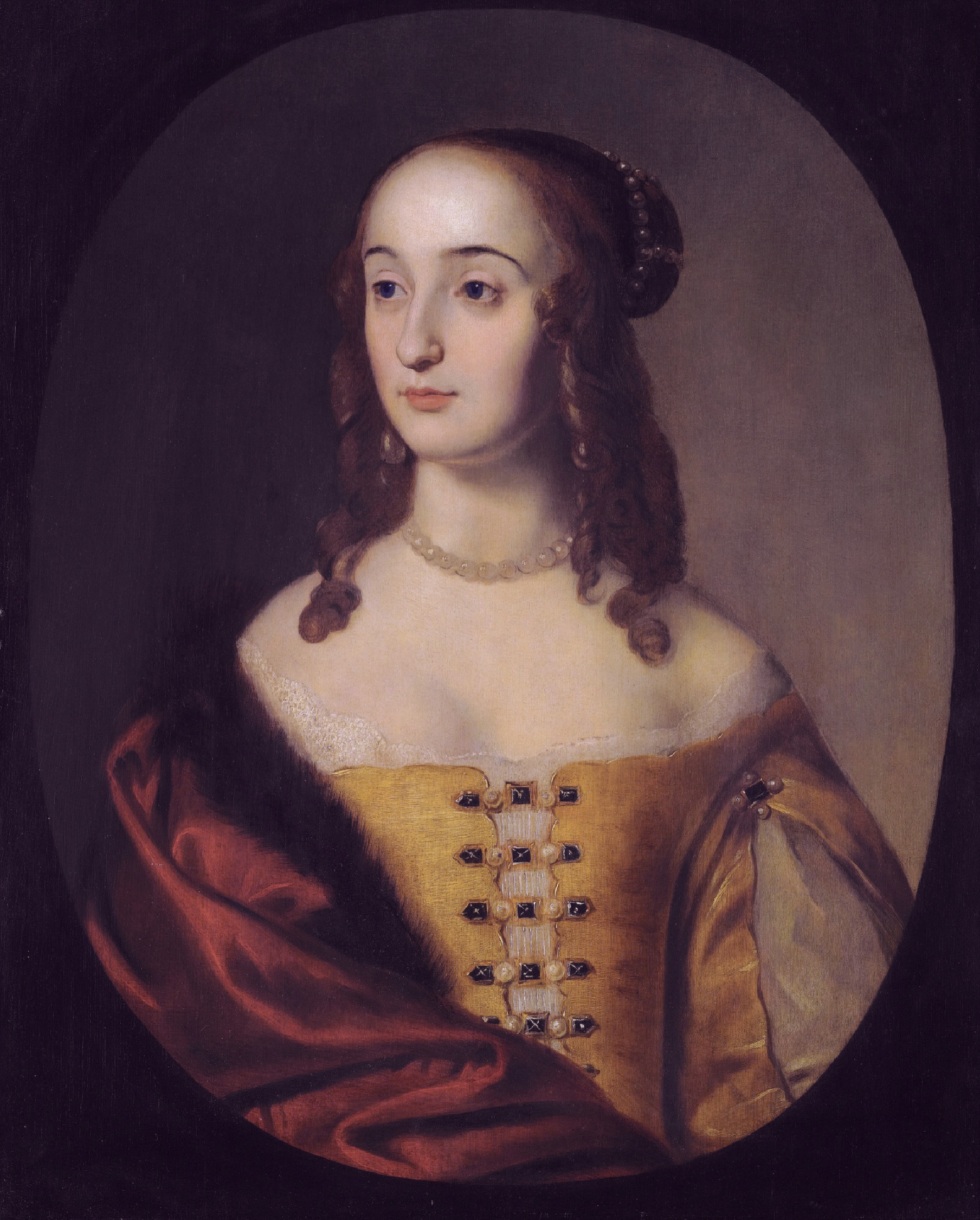
- Henriette Marie of the Palatinate - Studio of Honthorst
- Born: 17 July 1626; The Hague, Dutch Republic
- Died: 18 September 1651 (aged 25); Sárospatak, Kingdom of Hungary
- Burial: St. Michael's Cathedral
- Spouse: Sigismund Rákóczi (m. 1651)
- House: Palatinate-Simmern
- Father: Frederick V, Elector Palatine
- Mother: Elizabeth Stuart, Queen of Bohemia
- Religion: Protestant

Henriette Marie, Princess Palatine (17 July 1626 – 18 September 1651) was a daughter of Frederick V of the Palatinate, the "Winter King" of Bohemia, and Scottish princess Elizabeth Stuart. Before her death, she married Sigismund Rákóczi, a member of the House of Rákóczi of the Kingdom of Hungary.

== Early years ==
Henriette Marie, Princess Palatine, was the third daughter and ninth child of Frederick V, Elector Palatine and his wife, Elizabeth Stuart. Henriette was born in The Hague, Netherlands. Her paternal grandparents were Frederick IV, Elector Palatine and Louise Juliana of Nassau, and her maternal grandparents were James VI and I of Scotland and Anne of Denmark.

Henriette was born when her parents were in exile; due to this, her parents could hardly feed her. The family had to live off of Elizabeth's family funds and donations from her supporters.

== Marriage and death ==
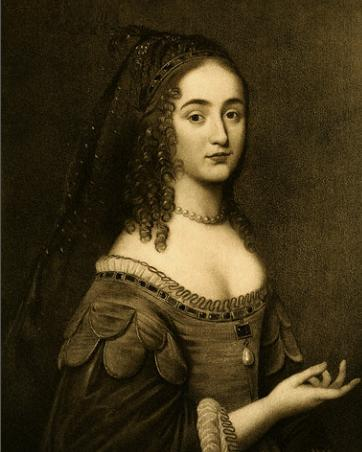
Princess Palatine Henriette Marie

On 4 April 1651, in Sárospatak, Hungary, Henrietta was married to Sigismund Rákóczi, brother of George Rákóczi II, Prince of Transylvania, by proxy. The couple had never met but he had fallen in love with her portrait. However, Karl I Ludwig, Elector Palatine, her brother, felt that a Transylvanian prince was beneath her as the sister of an elector. The bride herself, didn't have any strong feelings. She died unexpectedly five months later on 18 September 1651. Her husband followed her to the grave a few months later; both were buried in St. Michael's Cathedral in Gyulafehérvár.

== Ancestry ==
Ancestors of Henriette of the Palatinate

16. Frederick III, Elector Palatine
8. Louis VI, Elector Palatine
17. Marie of Brandenburg-Kulmbach
4. Frederick IV, Elector Palatine
18. Philip I, Landgrave of Hesse
9. Elisabeth of Hesse
19. Christine of Saxony
2. Frederick V, Elector Palatine
20. William I, Count of Nassau-Siegen
10. William the Silent
21. Juliana of Stolberg-Werningerode
5. Louise Juliana of Nassau
22. Louis III de Bourbon, Duke of Montpensier
11. Charlotte of Bourbon-Montpensier
23. Jacqueline de Longwy
1. Princess Henriette Marie
24. Matthew Stewart, 4th Earl of Lennox
12. Henry Stuart, Lord Darnley
25. Margaret Douglas
6. James I of England
26. James V of Scotland
13. Mary Stuart, Queen of Scotland
27. Mary of Guise
3. Elizabeth Stuart
28. Christian III of Denmark
14. Frederick II of Denmark
29. Dorothea of Saxe-Lauenburg
7. Anne of Denmark
30. Ulrich III of Mecklenburg-Güstrow
15. Sophie of Mecklenburg-Güstrow
31. Elizabeth of Denmark
