= Elizabeth Stuart, Queen of Bohemia =

Electress Palatine from 1613 to 1623

Elizabeth Stuart
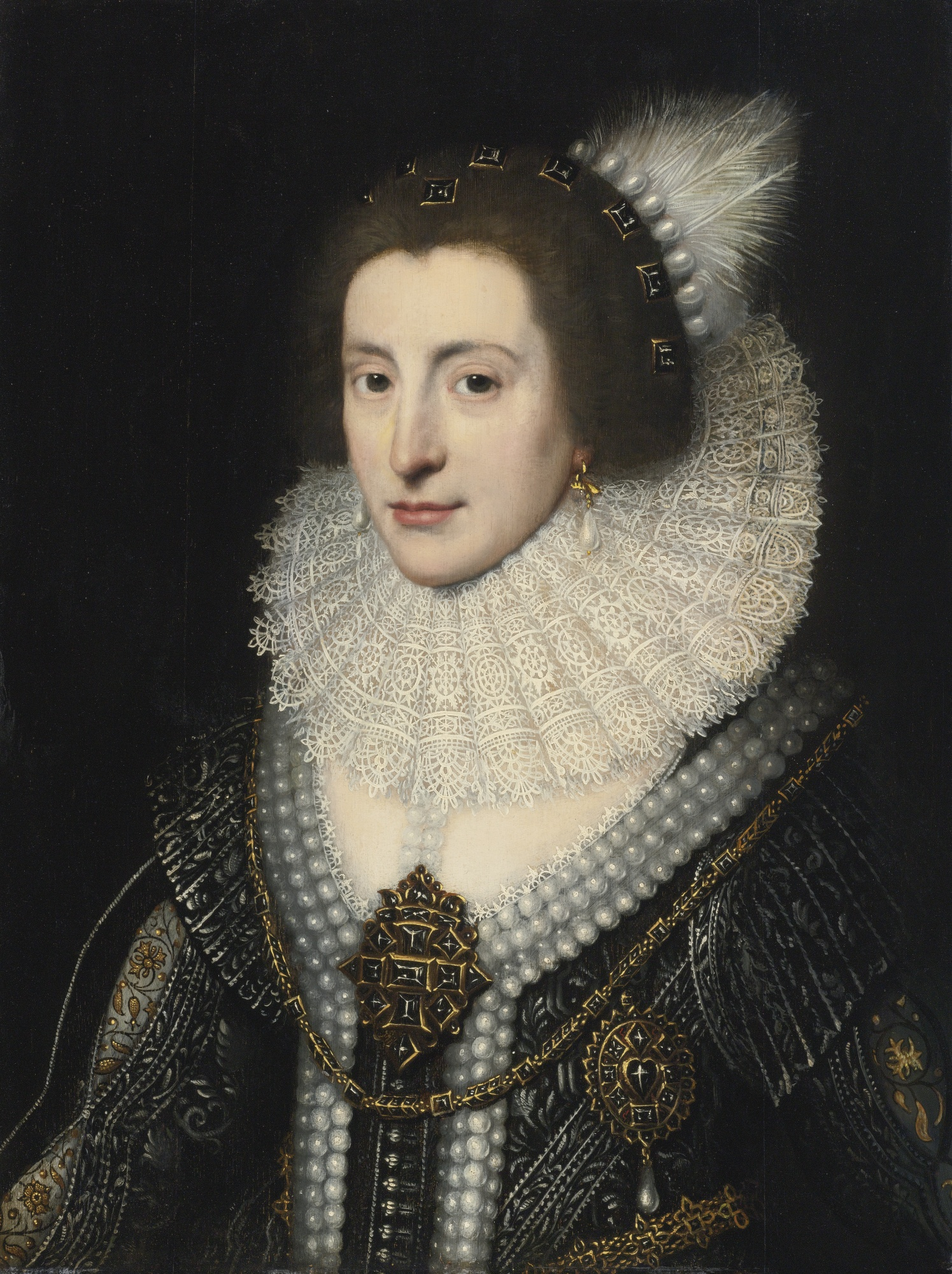
- Portrait by the Workshop of Michiel Jansz. van Mierevelt, c. 1623

Electress consort of the Palatinate
- Tenure: 14 February 1613 – 23 February 1623

Queen consort of Bohemia
- Tenure: 4 November 1619 – 8 November 1620
- Coronation: 7 November 1619; St Vitus Cathedral
- Born: 19 August 1596; Dunfermline Palace, Fife, Scotland
- Died: 13 February 1662 (aged 65); Leicester House, Westminster, London, England
- Burial: 17 February 1662; Westminster Abbey, London
- Spouse: Frederick V, Elector Palatine (m. 1613; died 1632)
- Issue: See: Henry Frederick, Electoral Prince of the Palatinate; Charles I Louis, Elector Palatine; Elisabeth, Princess-Abbess of Herford; Prince Rupert, Duke of Cumberland; Prince Maurice; Louise Hollandine, Abbess of Maubuisson; Prince Louis; Prince Edward, Count Palatine of Simmern; Princess Henriette Marie; Prince Philip Frederick; Princess Charlotte; Sophia, Electress of Hanover; Prince Gustavus Adolphus
- House: Stuart
- Father: James VI and I
- Mother: Anne of Denmark

Elizabeth Stuart (19 August 1596 – 13 February 1662) was Electress of the Palatinate and briefly Queen of Bohemia as the wife of Frederick V of the Palatinate. The couple's selection for the crown by the nobles of Bohemia was part of the political and religious turmoil that set off the Thirty Years' War. Since her husband's reign in Bohemia lasted over only one winter, she is called "The Winter Queen" (German: Die Winterkönigin, Czech: Zimní královna).

Princess Elizabeth was the only surviving daughter of James VI and I, King of Scotland, England, and Ireland, and his queen, Anne of Denmark; she was the elder sister of Charles I. Born in Scotland, she was named in honour of her father's cousin and predecessor on the English throne, Elizabeth I. During Elizabeth Stuart's childhood, unbeknownst to her, part of the failed Gunpowder Plot was a scheme to replace her father with her on the throne, and forcibly raise her as a Catholic.

Her father later arranged for her marriage to the Protestant Frederick V, a senior prince of the Holy Roman Empire. They were married in the Chapel Royal in the Palace of Whitehall, and then left for his lands in Germany. Their marriage proved successful, but after they left Bohemia, they spent years in exile in The Hague, while the Thirty Years' War continued. In her widowhood, she eventually returned to England at the end of her own life during the Stuart Restoration of her nephew and is buried in Westminster Abbey.

With the death in 1714 of Elizabeth's great-niece, Anne, Queen of Great Britain, the last Stuart monarch, the British throne passed to her grandson (by her daughter Sophia of Hanover) as George I, initiating the rule of the House of Hanover.

== Early life ==
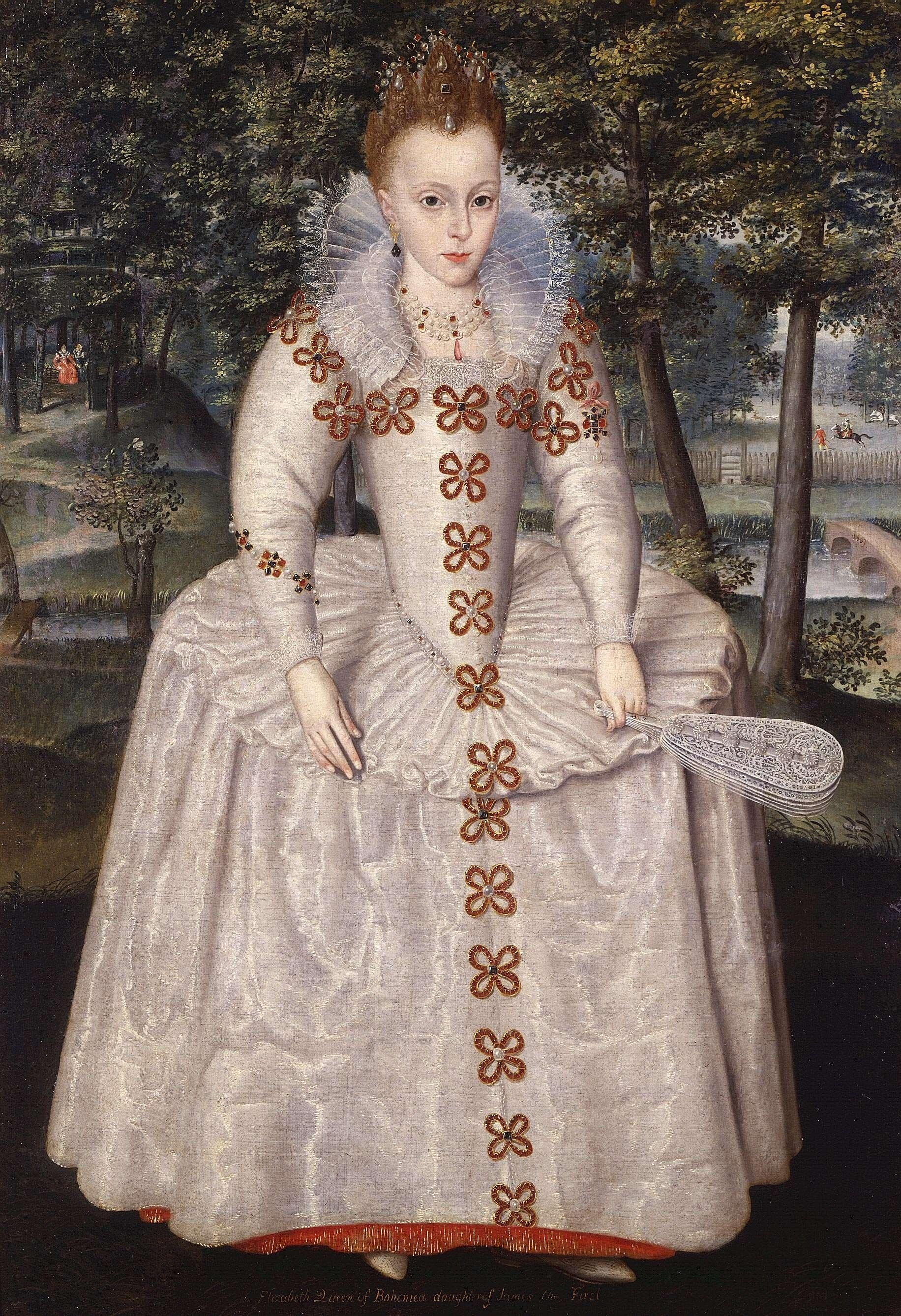
Elizabeth at the age of 7 by Robert Peake the Elder

Elizabeth was born at Dunfermline Palace, Fife, on 19 August 1596 at 2:00 am. King James rode to the bedside from Callendar, where he was attending the wedding of the Earl of Orkney. At the time of her birth, her father was King of Scotland, but not yet King of England. Named in honour of Elizabeth I of England, her godmother, the young Elizabeth was christened on 28 November 1596 in the Chapel Royal at Holyroodhouse, and was then proclaimed by the heralds as "Lady Elizabeth". During her early life in Scotland, Elizabeth was brought up at Linlithgow Palace, where she was placed in the care of Lord Livingstone and his wife, Eleanor Hay. A couple of years later the king's second daughter, Margaret, was placed in their care as well. Elizabeth "did not pay particular attention to this younger sister", as even at this young age her affections were with her brother, Henry.

=== Move to England ===
When Queen Elizabeth I of England died in 1603, Elizabeth Stuart's father, James, succeeded as King of England and Ireland. The Countess of Kildare was appointed the princess's governess. Along with her elder brother, Henry, Elizabeth made the journey southward to England with her mother "in a triumphal progress of perpetual entertainment". On her father's birthday, 19 June, Elizabeth danced at Worksop Manor with Robert Cecil's son.

Elizabeth remained at court for a few weeks, but "there is no evidence that she was present at her parents' coronation" on 25 July 1603. It seems likely that by this time the royal children already had been removed to Oatlands, an old Tudor hunting lodge near Weybridge. There was plague in London, and Prince Henry and Princess Elizabeth were moved to Winchester. Her mother, Anne of Denmark, produced a masque to welcome them. On 19 October 1603 "an order was issued under the privy seal announcing that the King had thought fit to commit the keeping and education of the Lady Elizabeth to the Lord Harrington [sic] and his wife".

Under the care of Lord and Lady Harington at Coombe Abbey, Elizabeth met Anne Dudley, with whom she was to strike up a lifelong friendship. On 3 April 1604, Princess Elizabeth and her ladies rode from Coombe Abbey to Coventry. The Mayor and Aldermen met her at "Jabet's Ash on Stoke-green". She heard a sermon in St Michael's Church and dined in St Mary's Hall.

=== Gunpowder Plot ===
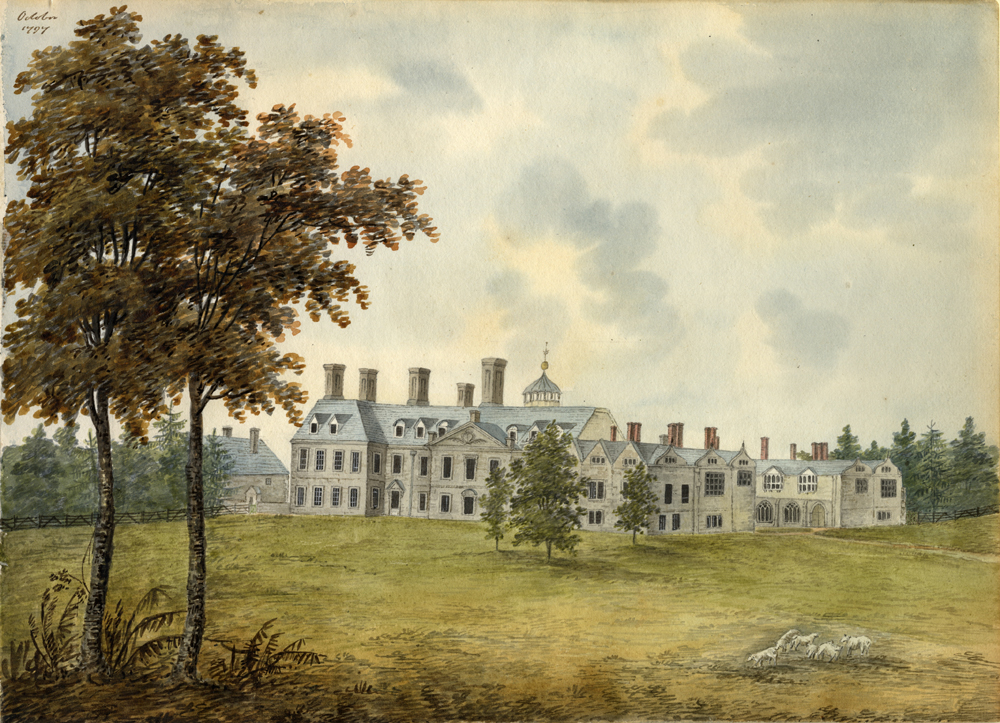
Coombe Abbey painted in 1797 by Maria Johnson

Part of the intent of the Gunpowder Plot of 1605 was to assassinate Elizabeth's father King James and the Protestant aristocracy, kidnap the nine-year-old Elizabeth from Coombe Abbey, and place her on the throne of England – and presumably the thrones of Ireland and Scotland – as a Catholic monarch. The conspirators chose Elizabeth after considering the other available options. Prince Henry, it was believed, would perish alongside his father. Charles was seen as too feeble (having only just learnt to walk) and Mary too young. Elizabeth, on the other hand, had already attended formal functions, and the conspirators knew that "she could fulfil a ceremonial role despite her comparative youth".

The conspirators aimed to cause an uprising in the Midlands to coincide with the explosion in London and at this point secure Elizabeth's accession as a puppet queen. She would then be brought up as a Catholic and later married to a Catholic bridegroom. The plot failed when the conspirators were betrayed, and Guy Fawkes was caught by the King's soldiers before he was able to ignite the powder.

=== Education ===
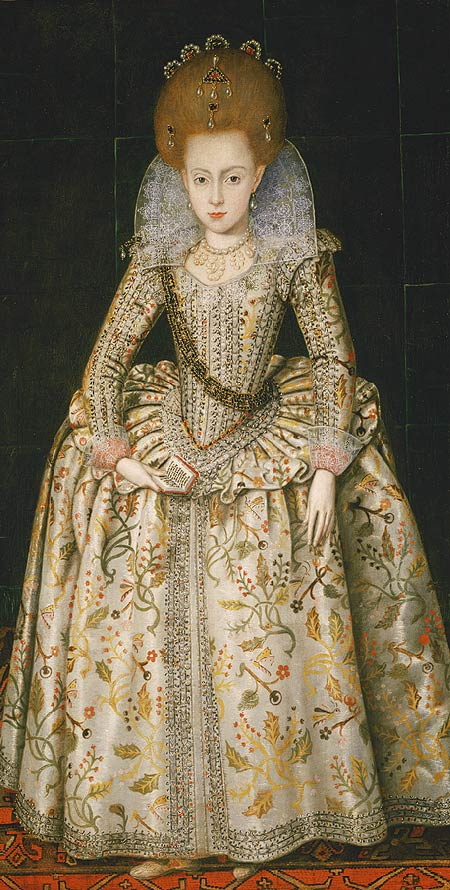
Elizabeth, aged about 10 years old, by Robert Peake the Elder

Elizabeth was given a comprehensive education for a princess at that time. This education included instruction in natural history, geography, theology, languages, writing, music, and dancing. She was denied instruction in the classics as her father believed that "Latin had the unfortunate effect of making women more cunning". By the age of 12, Elizabeth was fluent in several languages, including French, "which she spoke with ease and grace" and would later use to converse with her husband. She was also an excellent rider, had a thorough understanding of the Protestant religion, and had an aptitude for writing letters that "sounded sincere and never stilted". She also was extremely literary, and "several mementoes of her early love of books exist".

== Courtship and marriage ==
=== Suitors ===
As the daughter of a reigning monarch, the hand of the young Elizabeth was seen as a very desirable prize. Suitors came from across the continent and were many and varied. They included:

- Gustavus Adolphus of Sweden, son (and later successor) of the King of Sweden
- Frederic Ulric, Duke of Brunswick-Wolfenbüttel
- Prince Maurice of Nassau
- Theophilus Howard, Lord Howard of Walden, later second Earl of Suffolk
- Otto, Hereditary Prince of Hesse-Kassel, son of Maurice, Landgrave of Hesse-Kassel
- Victor Amadeus, Prince of Piedmont, the King of Spain's nephew and heir to the Duke of Savoy
- Philip III of Spain, newly widowed in 1611, and rumoured to be interested, although it was unlikely that the staunchly Catholic Spanish monarch would have wanted to marry a Protestant princess.

Marriage could be of great benefit to her father's kingdom. When James had succeeded to the English throne in 1603, England had acquired a new role in European affairs. James, unlike the childless Elizabeth I, by simply "having children, could play an important role in dynastic politics".

Most of her suitors were rejected quickly for a variety of reasons. Some simply were not of high enough birth, had no real prospects to offer, or in the case of Gustavus Adolphus, who on all other grounds seemed like a perfect match, because "his country was at war with Queen Anne's native Denmark". A marriage to Philip III of Spain would have meant that Elizabeth had to convert to Catholicism, which was unacceptable to the English court. Furthermore, England could not face another religious revolution, and therefore the religious pre-requisite was paramount.

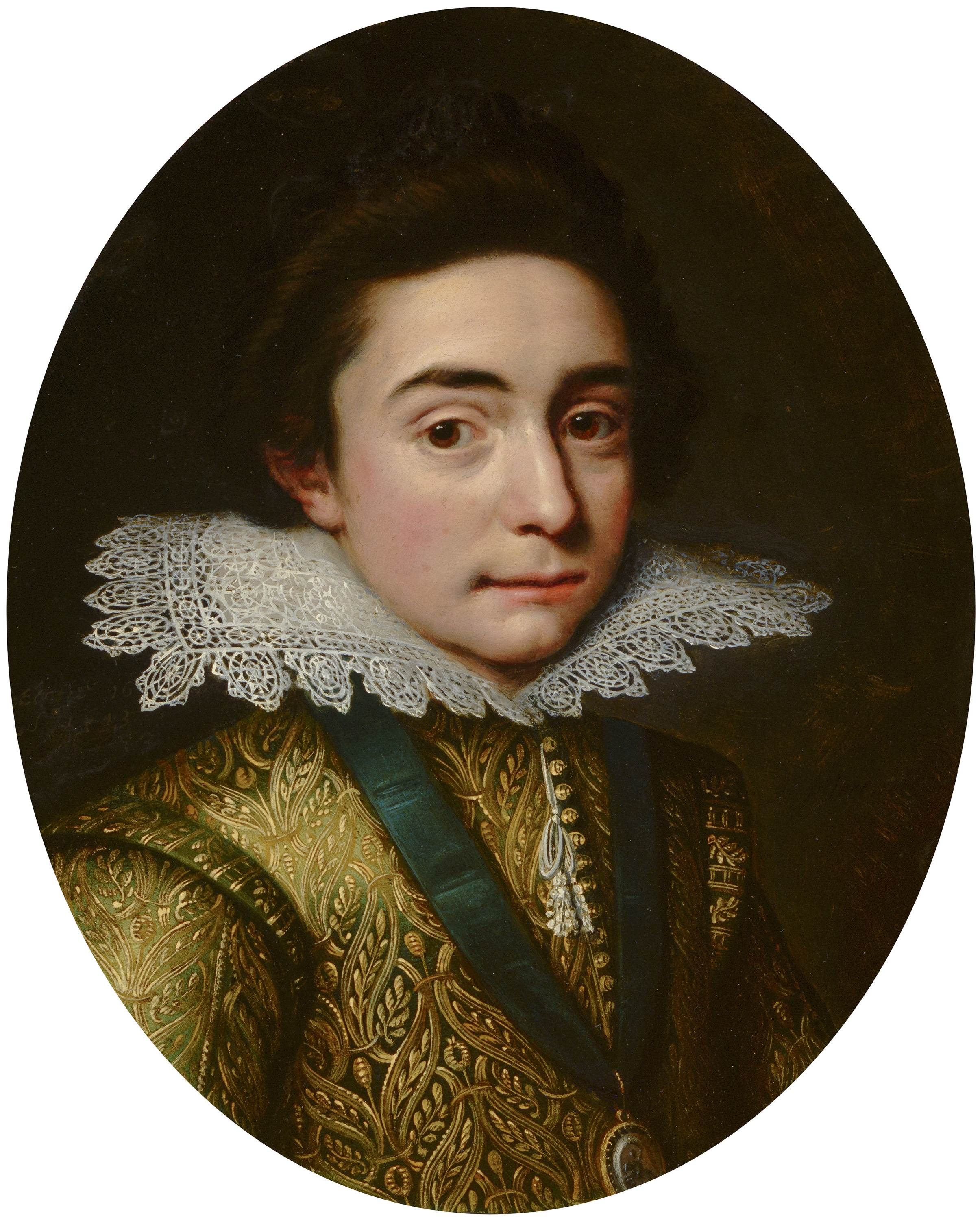
Portrait of Frederick believed to have been painted in 1613 the year of his marriage to Elizabeth by Michiel Jansz. van Mierevelt

The man chosen was Frederick (Friedrich) V, Count Palatine of the Rhine. Frederick was of undeniably high lineage. His ancestors included the kings of Aragon and Sicily, the landgraves of Hesse, the dukes of Brabant and Saxony, and the counts of Nassau and Leuven. He and Elizabeth also shared a common ancestor in Henry II of England. He was "a senior Prince of the Empire" and a staunch defender of the Protestant faith.

However, Frederick's mother, Countess Louise Juliana of Nassau, was said to be against the match. His uncles, Duke of Bouillon, and Prince Maurice of House of Orange-Nassau, urged him to accept, since the kingdom of Bohemia was important as being ex offico one of the seven Electors. If he accepted and also had the throne of Palatine, then Lutherans would hold 4 out of 7 of the offices, which would endanger the Habsburgs.

=== Courtship ===
Frederick arrived in England on 16 October 1612, and the match seemed to please them both from the beginning. Their contemporaries noted how Frederick seemed to "delight in nothing but her company and conversation". Frederick also struck up a friendship with Elizabeth's elder brother, Prince Henry, which delighted his prospective bride immensely. King James did not take into consideration the couple's happiness, but saw the match as "one step in a larger process of achieving domestic and European concord". The only person seemingly unhappy with the match was Queen Anne. As the daughter of a king, the sister of a king, the wife of a king, and the mother of a future king, she also desired to be the mother of a queen. She is said to have been somewhat fond of Frederick's mild manner and generous nature but simply felt that he was of low stock.

On 6 November 1612, Henry, Prince of Wales, died. His death took an emotional toll on Elizabeth, and her new position as second-in-line to the throne made her an even more desirable match. Queen Anne and those like-minded who had "always considered the Palsgrave to be an unworthy match for her, were emboldened in their opposition". Elizabeth stood by Frederick, whom her brother had approved, and whom she found to have the sentiments of a fine gentleman. Above all, he was "regarded as the future head of the Protestant interest in Germany".

=== Marriage to Frederick V ===
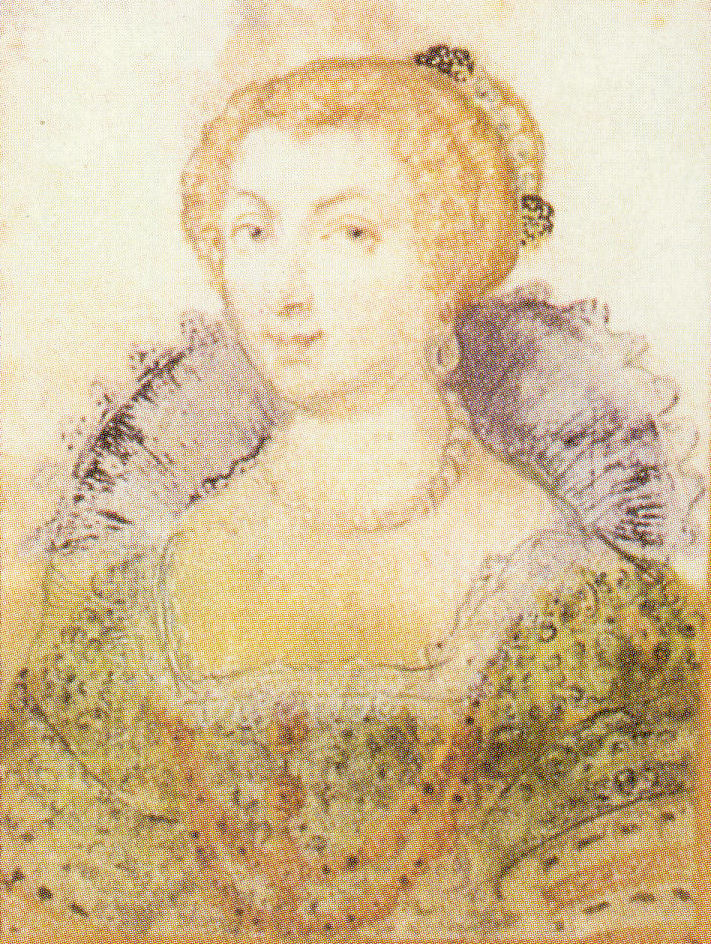
Portrait of Elizabeth by an unknown artist

The wedding took place on 14 February 1613 at the royal chapel at the Palace of Whitehall and was a grand occasion that saw more royalty than ever visit the court of England. The marriage was an enormously popular match and was the occasion for an outpouring of public affection with the ceremony described as "a wonder of ceremonial and magnificence even for that extravagant age".

It was celebrated with lavish and sophisticated festivities both in London and Heidelberg, including mass feasts and lavish furnishings that cost nearly £50,000, and nearly bankrupted King James. Among many celebratory writings of the events was John Donne's "Epithalamion, Or Marriage Song on the Lady Elizabeth, and Count Palatine being married on St Valentine's Day". A contemporary author viewed the whole marriage as a prestigious event that saw England "lend her rarest gem, to enrich the Rhine".

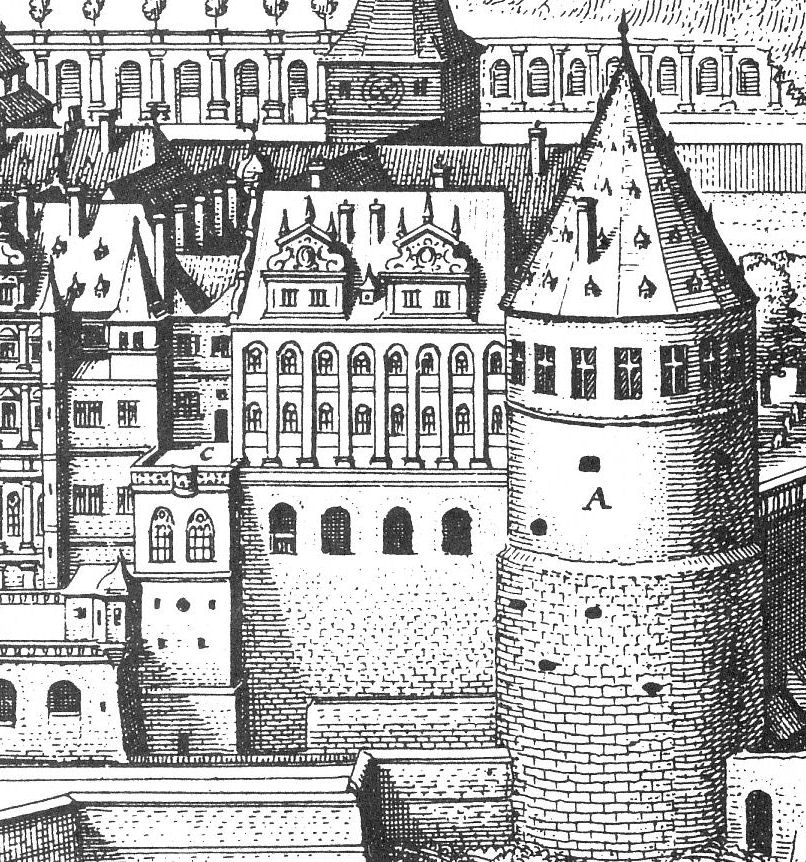
Englischer Bau left of the "Thick Tower", 1645 by Matthäus Merian

== Electress Palatine ==
After almost a two-month stay in London for continued celebrations, the couple began their journey to join the Electoral court in Heidelberg. The journey was filled with meeting people, sampling foods and wines, and being entertained by a wide variety of performers and companies. At each place the young couple stopped, Elizabeth was expected to distribute presents. The cash to allow her to do so was not readily available, so she had to use one of her own jewels as collateral so that the goldsmith Abraham Harderet would "provide her with suitable presents on credit".

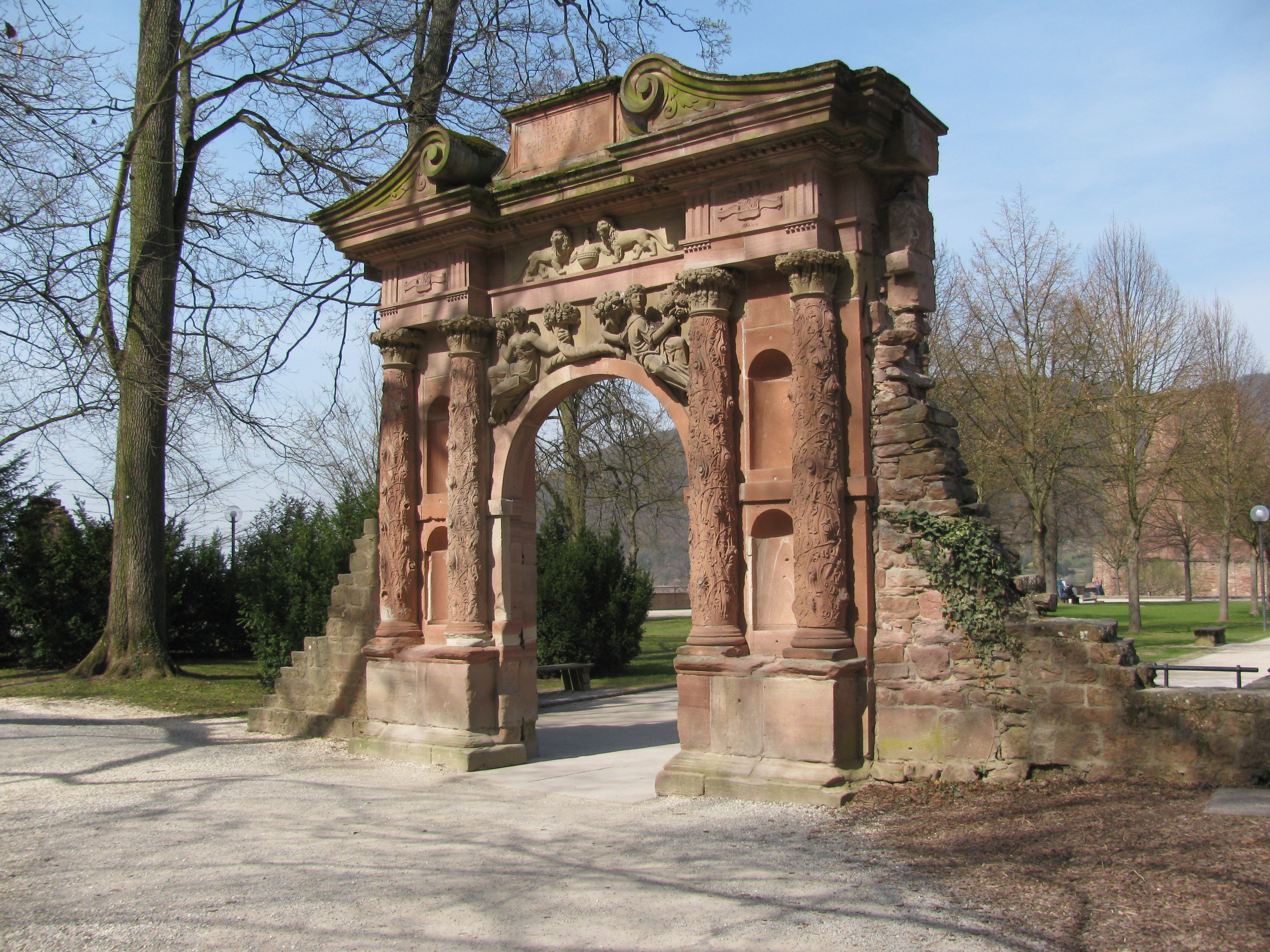
Elisabethentor (Elizabeth Gate) of Heidelberg Castle

Her arrival in Heidelberg was seen as "the crowning achievement of a policy which tried to give the Palatinate a central place in international politics" and was long anticipated and welcomed. Elizabeth's new husband transformed his seat at Heidelberg Castle, creating between 1610 and 1613 the Englischer Bau (i.e., English Building) for her, a monkey-house, a menagerie, and the beginnings of a new garden in the Italian Renaissance garden style popular in England at the time. The garden, the Hortus Palatinus, was constructed by Elizabeth's former tutor, Salomon de Caus. It was dubbed the "Eighth Wonder of the World" by contemporaries.

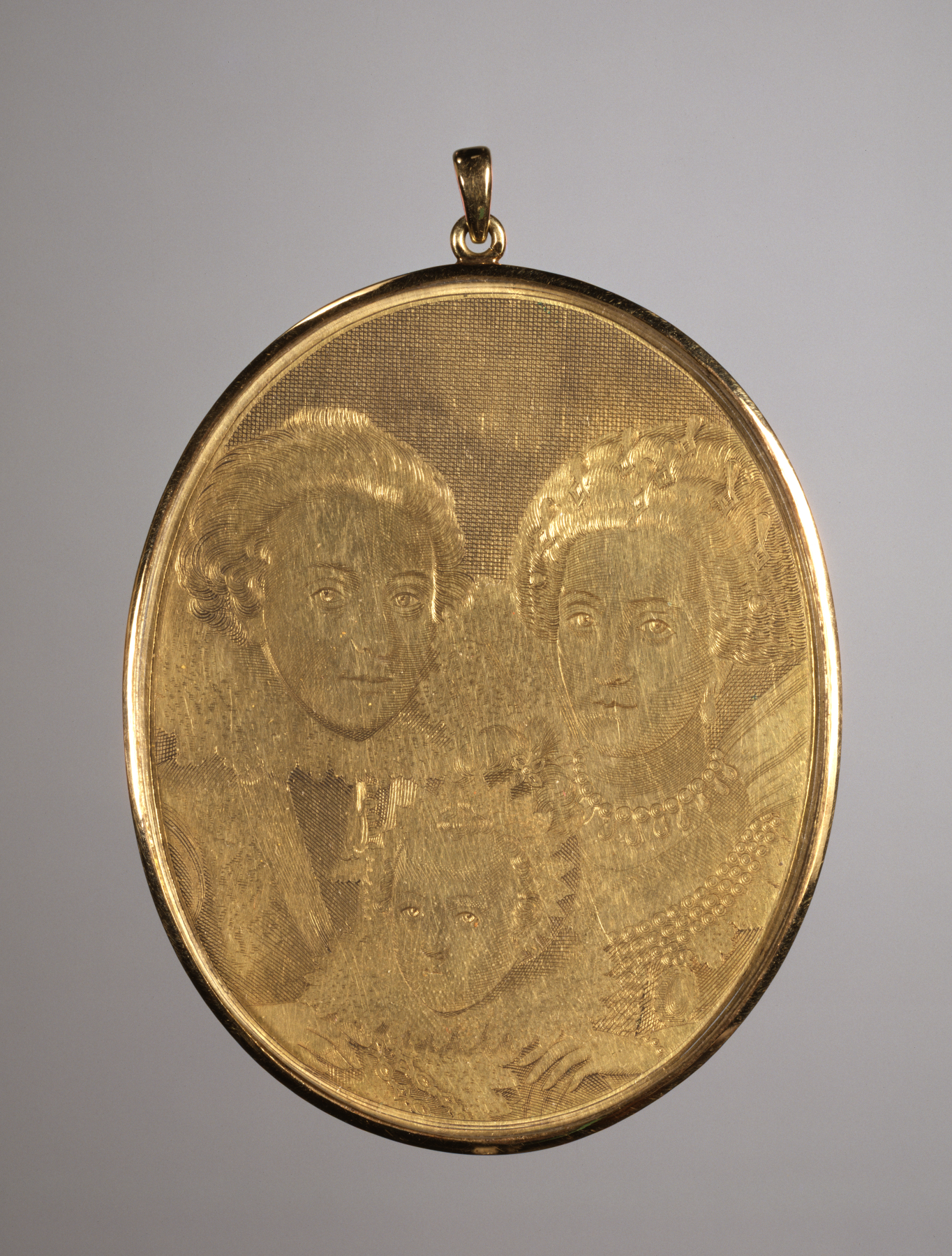
Gold medal made circa 1616 depicting Elizabeth, Frederick, and their son, Frederick Henry

Although Elizabeth and Frederick were considered to be genuinely in love and remained a romantic couple throughout the course of their marriage, problems already had begun to arise. Before the couple had left England, King James had made Frederick promise that Elizabeth "would take precedence over his mother ... and always be treated as if she were a Queen". This at times made life in the Palatinate uncomfortable for Elizabeth, for Frederick's mother Louise Juliana had "not expected to be demoted in favour of her young daughter-in-law" and, as such, their relationship was never more than civil.

Elizabeth gave birth to three children in Heidelberg: Frederick Henry, Hereditary Prince of the Palatinate (sometimes called Henry Frederick) was born in 1614, Charles in 1617, and Elisabeth in 1618.

== Queen of Bohemia ==
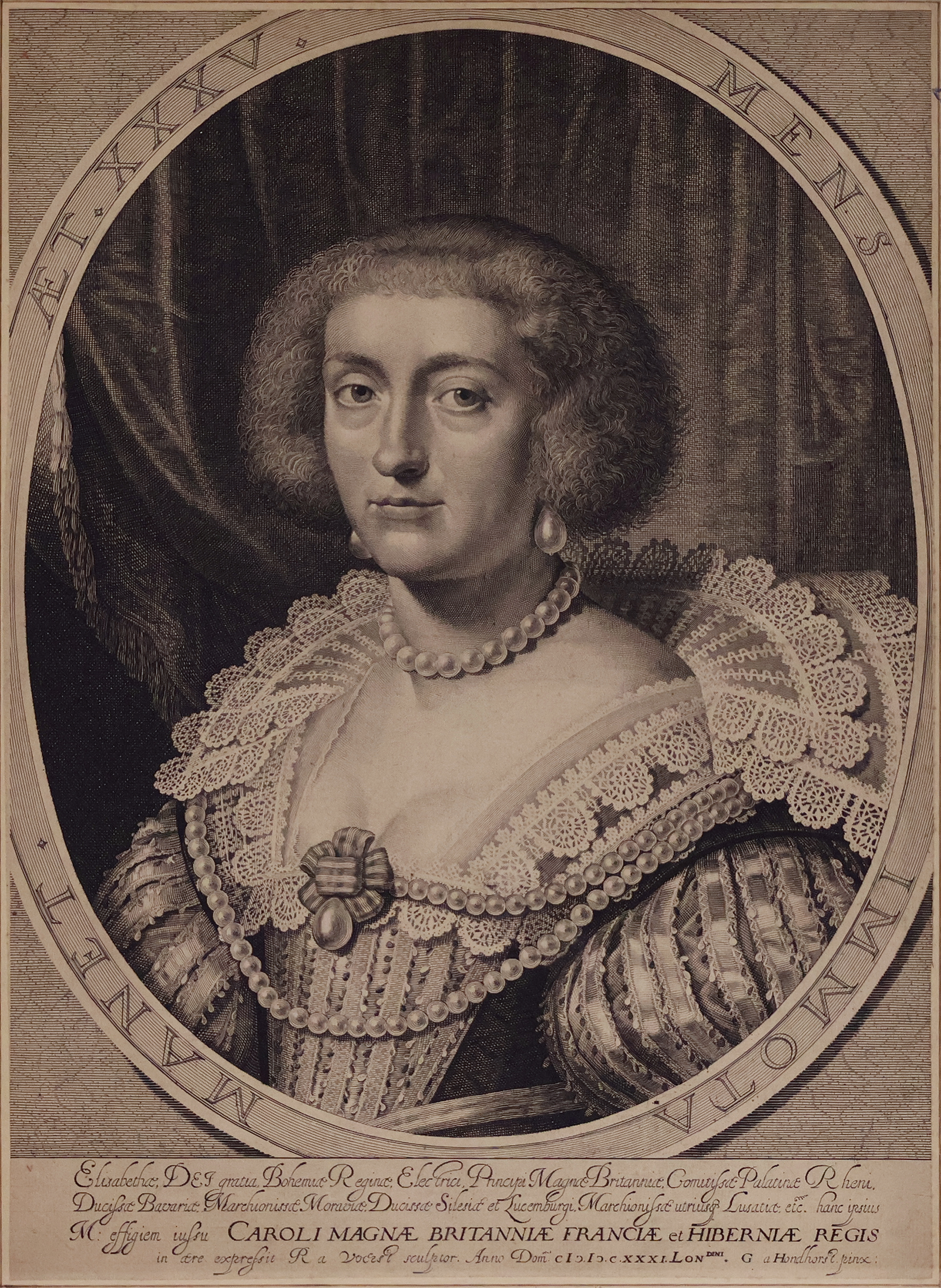
Elizabeth, Queen of Bohemia engraved by Robert van Voerst after Gerrit van Honthorst, 1631

In 1619 Elizabeth's husband Frederick was one of those offered the throne of Bohemia.

The Kingdom of Bohemia was "an aristocratic republic in all but name", whose nobles elected the monarch. It was one of the few successful pluralist states. The country had enjoyed a long period of religious freedom, but in March 1619, on the death of Emperor Matthias, this seemed about to change. The Habsburg heir, Archduke Ferdinand, crowned King of Bohemia in 1617, was a fervent Catholic who brutally persecuted Protestants in his Duchy of Styria. The Bohemian nobles had to choose between "either accepting Ferdinand as their king after all or taking the ultimate step of deposing him". They decided on deposition, and, when others declined because of the risks involved, the Bohemians "pandered to the elector's royalist pretensions" and extended the invitation to Elizabeth's husband.

Frederick, although doubtful, was persuaded to accept. Elizabeth "appealed to his honour as a prince and a cavalier, and to his humanity as a Christian", aligning herself with him completely. The family moved to Prague, where "the new King was received with genuine joy". Frederick was crowned officially in the St. Vitus Cathedral at the Prague Castle on 4 November 1619. The coronation of Elizabeth as Queen of Bohemia followed three days later.

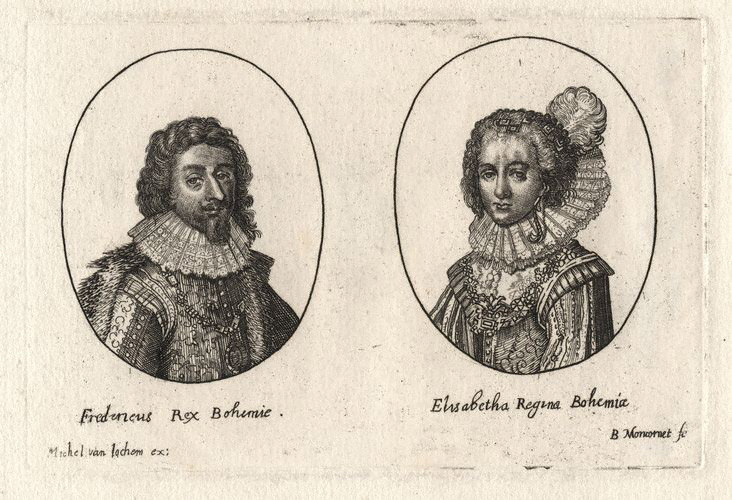
Engraving by Balthasar Moncornet of Frederick and Elizabeth as king and queen of Bohemia, 1620

The royal couple's third son, Prince Rupert, was born in Prague one month after the coronation. There was great popular rejoicing. Thus, Frederick's reign in Bohemia had begun well, but only lasted one year. The Bohemian crown "had always been a corner-stone of Habsburg policy" and the heir, Ferdinand, now Holy Roman Emperor Ferdinand II, would not yield. Frederick's reign ended with the defeat of Bohemian Protestant armies at the Battle of White Mountain (which ended the first phase of the Thirty Years' War) on 8 November 1620.

Elizabeth is remembered as the "Winter Queen", and Frederick as the "Winter King", in reference to the brevity of their reign, and to the season of the battle.

== Exile ==
Fearing the worst, by the time of the defeat at the Battle of White Mountain, Elizabeth already had left Prague and was awaiting the birth of her fifth child at the Castle of Custrin, about 80 km (50 mi) from Berlin. It was there on 6 January 1621 that she "in an easy labour lasting little more than an hour" was delivered of a healthy son, Maurice.

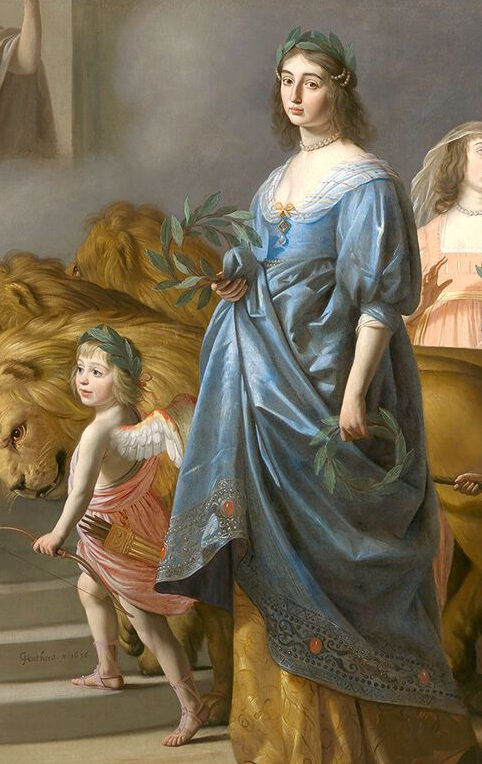
Detail of 1636 family Triumph portrait, Elizabeth's eldest daughter, Elisabeth of the Palatinate, and youngest son, Gustavus Adolphus of the Palatinate

The military defeat removed the prospect of returning to Prague, and the entire family was forced to flee. They could no longer return to the Palatinate as it was occupied by the Catholic league and a Spanish contingent. Hence, after an invitation from the Prince of Orange, they moved to The Hague.

Alas, Frederick had also made a mistake in leaving his homeland without adequate protection when he went off to Bohemia. His mother, Countess Louise Juliana of Nassau, had to flee to her daughter, Elizabeth Charlotte of the Palatinate, Electress of Brandenburg in Berlin.

Elizabeth arrived in The Hague in spring 1621 with only a small court. Her sense of duty to assist her husband out of the political mess in which they had found themselves meant that "she became much more an equal, if not the stronger, partner in the marriage". Her lady-in-waiting, Amalia van Solms, soon became involved with Frederick Henry, Prince of Orange, and married him in 1625. The two women became rivals at the court of The Hague.

While in exile Elizabeth produced eight more children, four boys and four girls. The last, Gustavus, was born on 2 January 1632 and baptised in the Cloister Church where two of his siblings who had died young, Louis and Charlotte, were buried. Later that same month, Frederick said farewell to Elizabeth and set out on a journey to join the king of Sweden on the battlefield. After declining conditions set out by King Gustavus Adolphus that would have seen the Swedish king assist in his restoration, the pair parted with Frederick heading back toward The Hague. He had been ill with an infection since the beginning of October 1632, and died on the morning of 29 November before reaching The Hague.

== Widowhood ==
When Elizabeth received the news of Frederick's death, she became senseless with grief and for three days did not eat, drink, or sleep. When Charles I heard of Elizabeth's state, he invited her to return to England, but she refused. The rights of her son and Frederick's heir Charles Louis "remained to be fought for". Elizabeth then fought for her son's rights, but she remained in The Hague even after he regained the Electorate of the Palatinate in 1648. She became a patron of the arts, and commissioned a larger family portrait to honour herself and her husband, to complement the impressive large seascape of her 1613 joyous entry to the Netherlands. Her memorial family portrait of 1636 was outdone by Amalia van Solms, who commissioned the Oranjezaal in 1648–1651 after the death of her husband Frederick Henry.

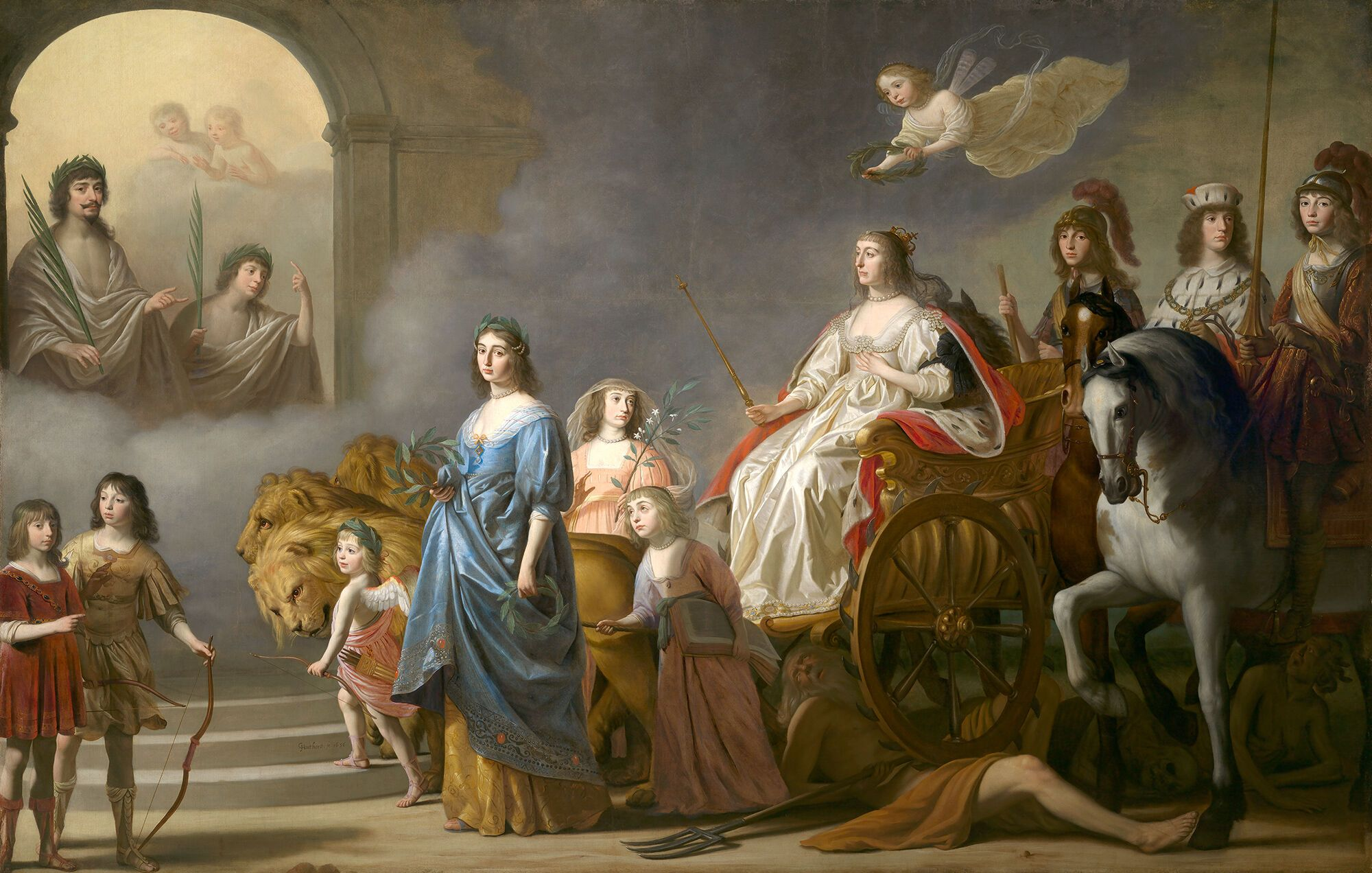
Triumph of the Winter Queen: Allegory of the Just, 1636, by Gerard van Honthorst.

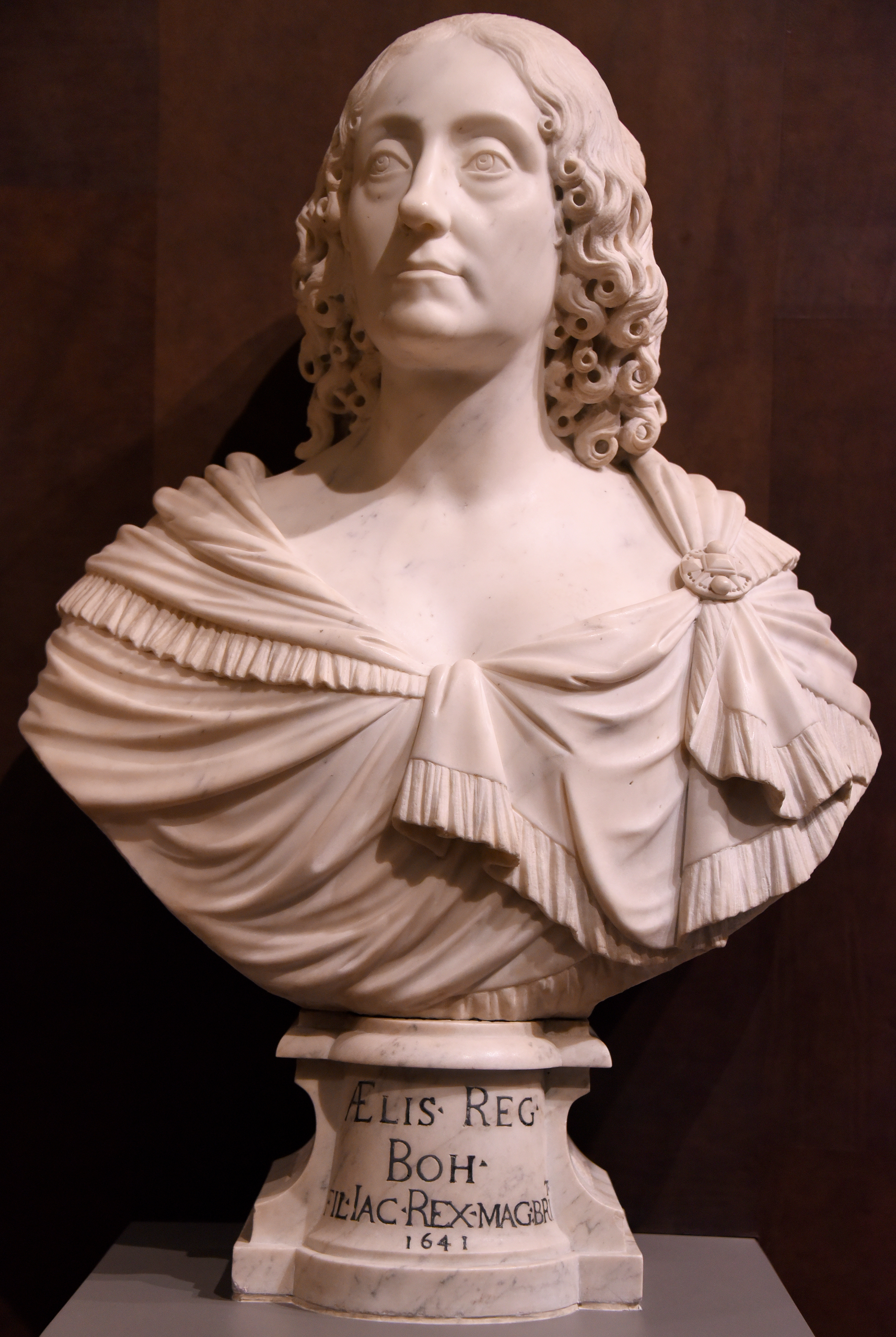
Marble bust of Elizabeth, Queen of Bohemia, circa 1641, by François Dieussart.

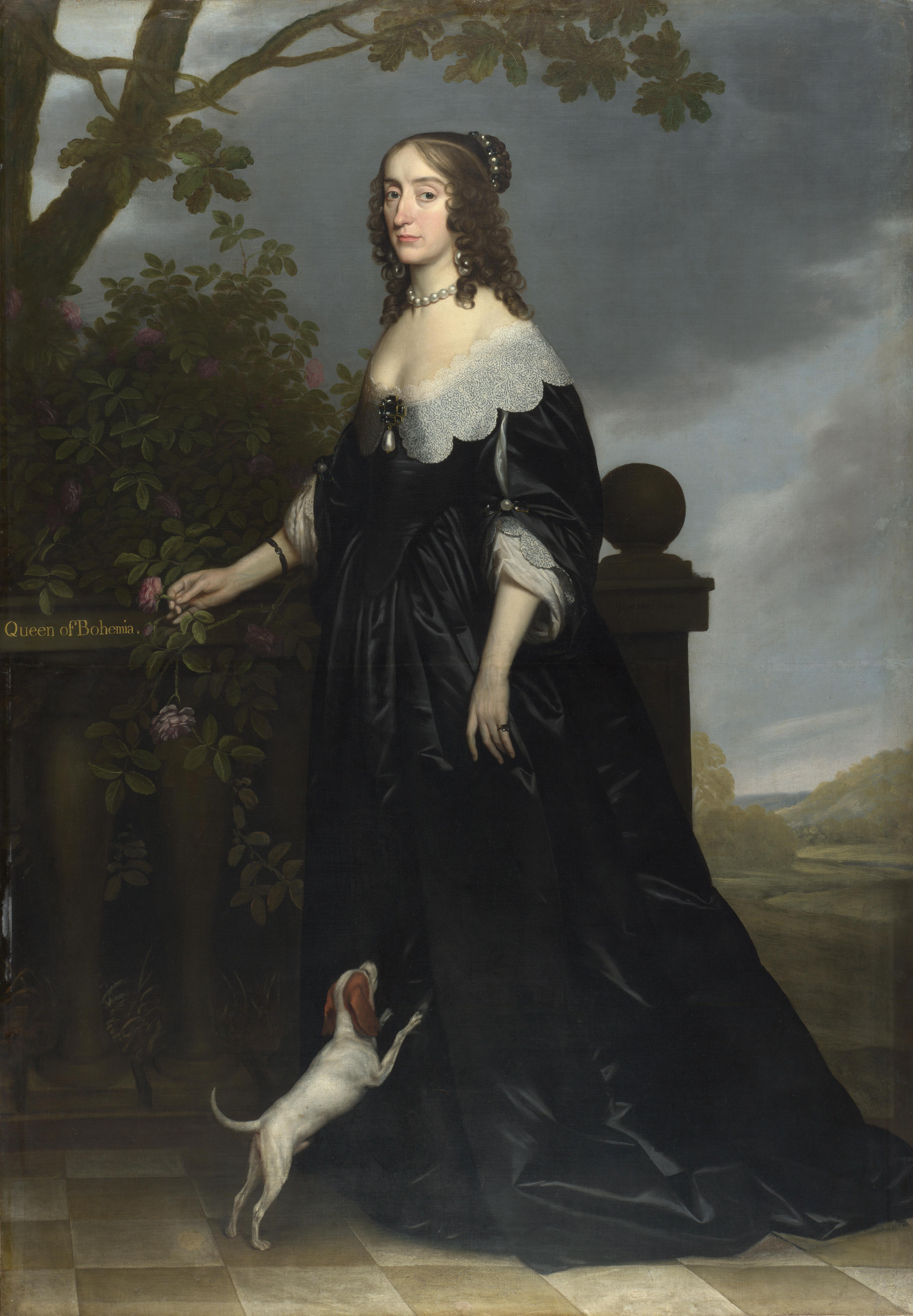
Elizabeth Stuart as a Widow, 1642, by Gerard van Honthorst.

Elizabeth filled her time with copious letter writing and making marriage matches for her children. Between Frederick's death in 1632 and her own 30 years later, she witnessed the deaths of four more of her ten surviving children: Gustavus in 1641, Philip in 1650, Henriette Marie in 1651, and Maurice in 1652. Her brother Charles I, King of England was executed in early 1649, and the surviving Stuart family was exiled during the years of the Commonwealth. The relationships with her remaining living children also became somewhat estranged, although she did spend time with her growing number of grandchildren. She began to pay the price for having been "a distant mother to most of her own children", and the idea of going to England now was uppermost in her thoughts.

== Death ==
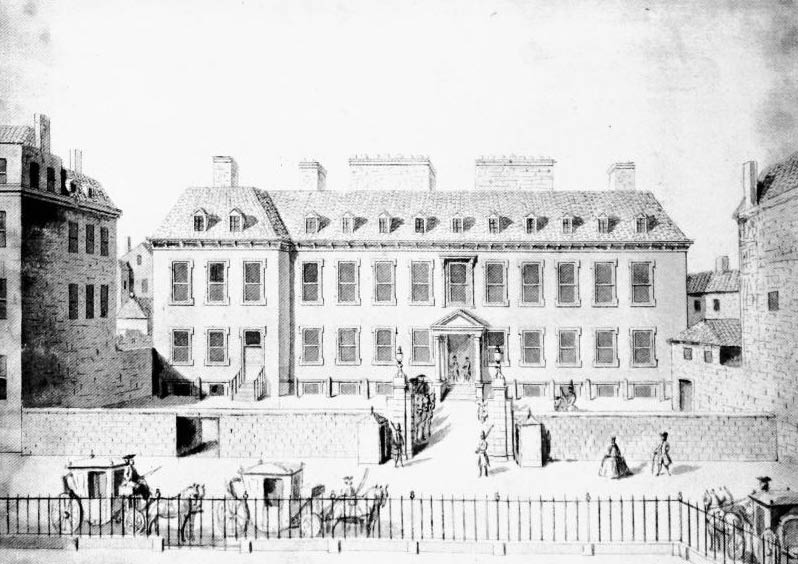
Leicester House (c. 1748)

In 1660, the Stuarts were restored to the thrones of England, Scotland and Ireland in the person of Elizabeth's nephew Charles II. Elizabeth arrived in England on 26 May 1661. By July, she was no longer planning on returning to The Hague and made plans for the remainder of her furniture, clothing, and other property to be sent to her. She then proceeded to move to Drury House, where she established a small, but impressive and welcoming, household. On 29 January 1662 she made another move, to Leicester House, Westminster, but by this time she was quite ill. Elizabeth caught pneumonia, bled from her lungs on 10 February 1662 and died soon after midnight on 13 February.

Her death caused little public stir as by then her "chief, if not only, claim to fame [in London] was as the mother of Rupert of the Rhine, the legendary Cavalier general". On the evening of 17 February, when her coffin (into which her remains had been placed the previous day) left Somerset House, Rupert was the only one of her sons to follow the funeral procession to Westminster Abbey. There in the chapel of Henry VII, "a survivor of an earlier age, isolated and without a country she could really call her own", she was laid to rest among her ancestors and close to her beloved elder brother, Henry, Prince of Wales, in the Mary, Queen of Scots vault.

== Issue ==
Elizabeth and Frederick had 13 children, six of whom outlived their mother:

1. Henry Frederick, Hereditary Prince of the Palatinate (1614–1629); drowned
2. Charles I Louis, Elector Palatine (1617–1680); married Charlotte of Hesse-Kassel, had issue including Elizabeth Charlotte, Princess Palatine, Duchess of Orleans; married Marie Luise von Degenfeld, had issue; married again Elisabeth Holländer von Berau (1659-1702), had issue
3. Elisabeth of the Palatinate (1618–1680)
4. Rupert, Count Palatine of the Rhine (1619–1682); had two illegitimate children
5. Maurice of the Palatinate (16 January 1621 – 1 September 1652)
6. Louise Hollandine of the Palatinate (18 April 1622 – 11 February 1709)
7. Louis (21 August 1624 – 24 December 1624)
8. Edward, Count Palatine of Simmern (1625–1663); married Anne Gonzaga, had issue
9. Henriette Marie of the Palatinate (7 July 1626 – 18 September 1651); married Prince Sigismund Rákóczi, brother of George II Rákóczi, Prince of Transylvania, on 16 June 1651
10. John Philip Frederick of the Palatinate (26 September 1627 – 16 February 1650); also reported to have been born on 15 September 1629
11. Charlotte of the Palatinate (19 December 1628 – 14 January 1631)
12. Sophia, Electress of Hanover (14 October 1630 – 8 June 1714); married Ernest Augustus, Elector of Hanover, had issue, including King George I of Great Britain. Many other royal families are Sophia's, and thus Elizabeth's, descendants. Sophia came close to ascending to the British throne, but died two months before Queen Anne.
13. Gustavus Adolphus of the Palatinate (14 January 1632 – 1641)

== Ancestry and family tree ==
The British monarchs of the House of Stuart, their relations, and the transition to the Hanovers

James V 1512–1542 r. 1513–1542	Christian III of Denmark; 1503–1559
Mary, Queen of Scots; 1542–1587 r. 1542–1567	Frederick II of Denmark; 1534–1588	Dorothea of Denmark; 1546–1617
James VI and I 1566–1625 r. 1567/1603–1625	Anne of Denmark; 1574–1619	George, Duke of Brunswick-Calenberg; 1582–1641
Henrietta Maria of France; 1609–1669	Charles I 1600–1649 r. 1625–1649	Elizabeth Stuart, Queen of Bohemia; 1596–1662
HANOVER
Charles II; 1630–1685 r. 1660–1685	Mary, Princess Royal and Princess of Orange; 1631–1660	Anne Hyde; 1637–1671	James II and VII; 1633–1701 r. 1685–1688	Mary of Modena; 1658–1718	Sophia of Hanover; 1630–1714	Ernest Augustus, Elector of Hanover; 1629–1698
James Scott, Duke of Monmouth (illegitimate); 1649–1685	William III; 1650–1702 r. 1689–1702	Mary II; 1662–1694 r. 1689–1694	Anne; 1665–1714 r. 1702–1714	James Francis Edward Stuart "the Old Pretender"; 1688–1766	Louisa Maria Stuart; 1692–1712	George I 1660–1727 r. 1714–1727
(no children)	Prince William, Duke of Gloucester; 1689–1700	Charles Edward Stuart "the Young Pretender"; 1720–1788	Henry Benedict Stuart "Cardinal Duke of York"; 1725–1807	George II; 1683–1760 r. 1727–1760

== Legacy ==
Under the English Act of Settlement 1701, the succession to the English and Scottish crowns (later British crown) was settled on Elizabeth's youngest daughter Sophia of Hanover and her issue. In August 1714, Sophia's son (Elizabeth's grandson) George I ascended to the throne, with the future Royal family all his descendants and hence, also descendants of Elizabeth.

The Elizabeth River in colonial Southeastern Virginia was named in honour of the princess, as was Cape Elizabeth, a peninsula (and today a town) in the United States in the state of Maine. John Smith explored and mapped New England and gave names to places mainly based on the names used by Native Americans. When Smith presented his map to Charles I, he suggested that the king should feel free to change the "barbarous names" for "English" ones. The king made many such changes, but only four survive today, one of which is Cape Elizabeth.

According to legend, William Craven, 1st Earl of Craven, built Ashdown House in Berkshire, England, in honour of Elizabeth, although she died before the house was completed.

== Literary references ==
- The Polish baroque poet Daniel Naborowski wrote a short poem praising Elizabeth's eyes. He had seen her in 1609, when he visited London on a diplomatic mission.
- A poem in praise of Elizabeth was written by the courtier and poet Sir Henry Wotton.
- The Winter Queen plays a seminal role in Neal Stephenson's The Baroque Cycle which is largely set during her lifetime.
- Elizabeth is a main character in Daniel Kehlmann's novel Tyll (2017).

== See also ==
- Scotland and the Thirty Years' War

== Bibliography ==
- Akkerman, Nadine (2011), The Correspondence of Elizabeth Stuart, Queen of Bohemia, Oxford: Oxford University Press, ISBN 9780199551088
- Akkerman, Nadine (2021), Elizabeth Stuart, Queen of Hearts, Oxford: Oxford University Press, ISBN 9780199668304
- Anon., Guy Fawkes and Bonfire Night, Bonfirenight.net
- Anon. (1613), The Marriage of prince Fredericke, and the King's daughter the Lady Elizabeth..., London: Thomas Creede
- Allyne, Robert (1613), Tears of joy shed at the happy departure from Great Britaine, of... Frederick and Elizabeth..., London: Thomas Archer
- Asch, Ronald G. "Elizabeth, Princess [Elizabeth Stuart] (1596–1662), queen of Bohemia and electress palatine, consort of Frederick V". Oxford Dictionary of National Biography (online ed.). Oxford University Press. doi:10.1093/ref:odnb/8638. (Subscription, Wikipedia Library access or UK public library membership required.)
- Asch, Ronald (1997), The Thirty Years War, the Holy Roman Empire and Europe: 1618–1648, London: Macmillan Press
- Bonney, Richard (1991), The European Dynastic State: 1494–1660, New York: OUP
- Chisholm, Hugh, ed. (1911). "Elizabeth (daughter of James I.)" . Encyclopædia Britannica. Vol. 9 (11th ed.). Cambridge University Press. pp. 285–286.
- Curran, Kevin (2006). "James I and fictional authority at the Palatine wedding celebrations". Renaissance Studies. 20 (1): 51–67. doi:10.1111/j.1477-4658.2006.00113.x. S2CID 153513889.
- Erskine, Frances (1825), Memoirs Relating to the Queen of Bohemia, Vol.1, London: Longhurst
- Everett Green, Mary Anne (2010) [1855], Elizabeth, electress palatine and queen of Bohemia (1909 ed.), Milton Keynes: Bibliolife, ISBN 9781117402697
- Fraser, Antonia (2002), The Weaker Vessel: Woman's Lot in Seventeenth-Century England, part Two, London: Phoenix, ISBN 1407216120
- Gorst-Williams, Jessica (1977) [1976], Elizabeth the Winter Queen, London: Abelard, ISBN 0-200-72472X
- Hay, Marie (1910), The Winter Queen: being the unhappy history of Elizabeth Stuart, electress palatine, queen of Bohemia; a romance, Boston, New York: Boston and New York, Houghton, Mifflin company
- Jardine, Lisa (24 February 2013). "A Point of View: The Winter Queen of Bohemia". BBC Magazine.
- Kassel, Richard (2006), The Organ: An Encyclopedia, London: Routledge.
- Plowden, Alison (2003) [1996], The Stuart Princesses, Gloucestershire: Sutton Publishing, ISBN 0-7509-3238-4
- Ross, Josephine (1986) [1979], The Winter Queen: The Story of Elizabeth Stuart, New York: Dorset Press, ISBN 0-88029-068-4
- Spencer, Charles (2008) Prince Rupert: the Last Cavalier, London: Phoenix.
- Stevenson, Jane (2002), The Winter Queen: A Novel, Boston: Houghton Mifflin, ISBN 0-618-14912-0 (alternative ISBN 0-618-38267-4)
- Stewart, George R. (1967) [1945], Names on the Land: A Historical Account of Place-Naming in the United States (Sentry (3rd) ed.), Boston: Houghton Mifflin
- Turner, Tom (2005), Garden History: Philosophy and Design, 2000 BC – 2000 AD, London: Spon Press
- Wilson, Peter H. (June 2008). "The Causes of the Thirty years War 1618–48". English Historical Review. CXXIII (502): 554–586. doi:10.1093/ehr/cen160.
- Williams, Deanne (2014), "A Dancing Princess," Shakespeare and the Performance of Girlhood (New York: Palgrave, 2014): 127-148.
- Yates, Frances (1972), The Rosicrucian Enlightenment, London: Routledge and Kegan Paul, ISBN 0-7100-7380-1, devotes its early chapters to describing her 1613 wedding and the reputation she and her husband had in Europe at the time.

Elizabeth Stuart House of Stuart Born: 19 August 1596 Died: 13 February 1662
Royal titles
Vacant Title last held by Louise Juliana of Nassau	Electress consort Palatine; 14 February 1613 – 23 February 1623	Succeeded by Elisabeth of Lorraine
Vacant Title last held by Anna of Tyrol	Queen consort of Bohemia; 4 November 1619 – 9 November 1620	Vacant Title next held by Eleonora Gonzaga
