= Frederick Henry, Hereditary Prince of the Palatinate =

Prince Frederick Henry
- Electoral Prince of the Palatinate
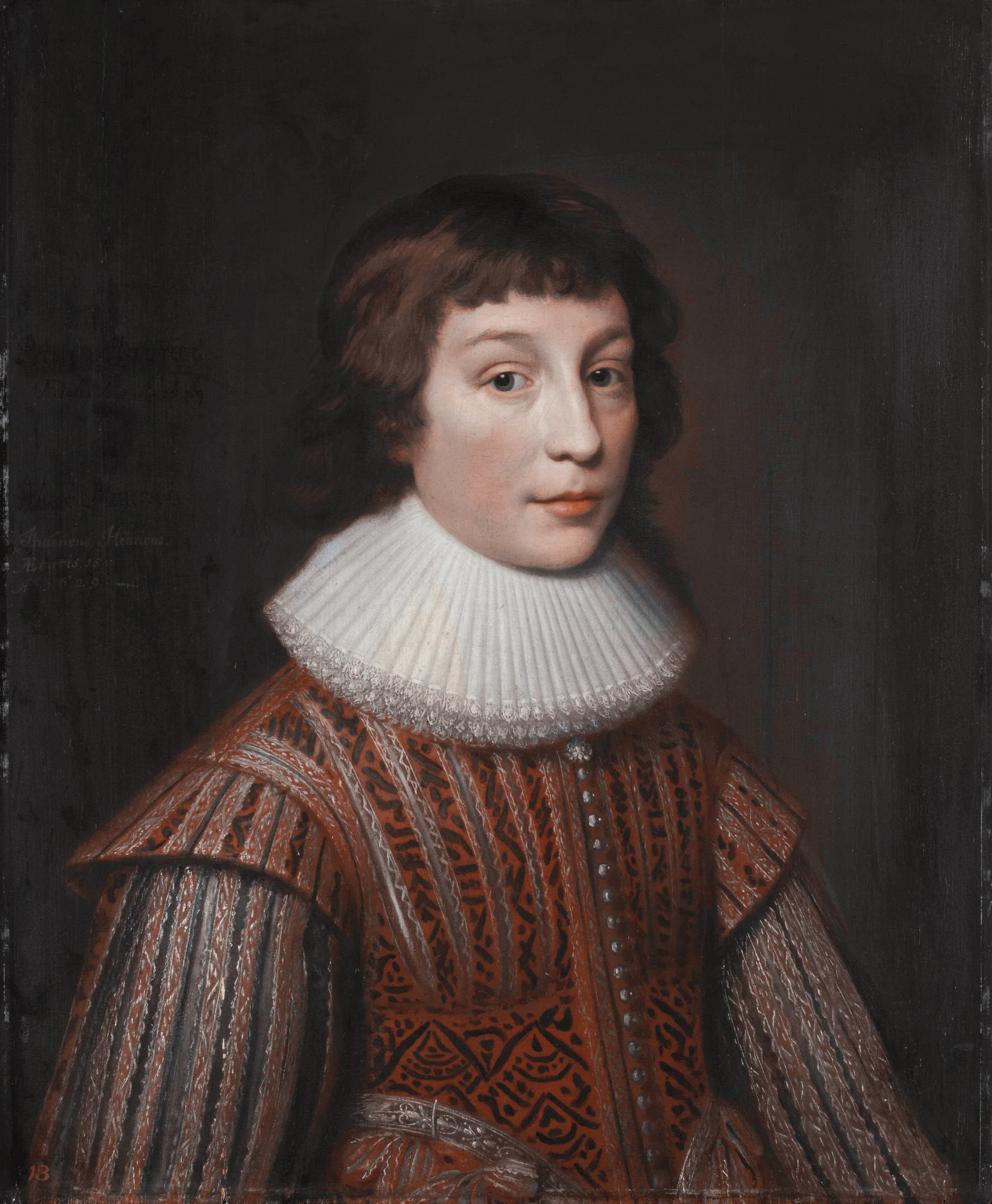
- 1629 portrait
- Born: 1 January 1614; Heidelberg, Holy Roman Empire
- Died: 7 January 1629 (aged 15); IJ, Dutch Republic
- Burial: Kloosterkerk
- House: Palatinate-Simmern
- Father: Frederick V, Elector Palatine
- Mother: Elizabeth of Bohemia

Frederick Henry, Electoral Prince of the Palatinate, (German: Heinrich Friedrich; 1 January 1614 – 7 January 1629) was the eldest son of Frederick V, Elector Palatine and so-called "Winter King" of Bohemia, and his wife, Elizabeth Stuart, daughter of King James VI of Scotland and I of England.

== Celebration of his birth ==
As soon as the prince was born, Elizabeth ordered "pieces" using the English word, meaning the firing of cannon to celebrate the birth. He was named after his father and his late uncle Henry, Prince of Wales, who had died less than two years earlier during the celebrations leading up to his parents' wedding. As a gift to celebrate Frederick Henry's birth, King James rewarded Elizabeth with a pension of 12,000 crowns a year for life and money and gold worth an additional 25,000 crowns.

== Successor to the throne of Bohemia ==
In 1618, Frederick was elected King of Bohemia. Frederick Henry was the only one of his siblings to accompany his parents to Prague for the coronation and was elected successor to the Crown a few days before the birth of his brother Rupert. In September 1620, he was sent on a royal progress through Bohemia and the Upper Palatinate with a guard of 4,000 men, which ended in Leeuwarden where his kinsman Ernst Casimir, Stadtholder of Friesland, Groningen and Drenthe, took custody of him.

== Exile in the Hague ==
After his parents lost control of Bohemia and the Palatinate, they fled to exile in the Hague. Frederick Henry joined them by May 1621, when he wrote a letter from the Hague to King James. In June 1623, his parents set up a separate royal court for their children at a building three hours away in Leiden, known as the Prinsenhof or the Princes' court. Frederick Henry also formally enrolled as a student at Leiden University.

== Marriage negotiations ==
As part of various efforts to fight or negotiate an end to the Thirty Years War, several potential marriages were considered for Frederick Henry. These include marriages to a daughter of Holy Roman Emperor Ferdinand II and a niece of Maximilian I, Duke of Bavaria.

== Drowning ==
In 1629, Frederick Henry went with his father to Amsterdam to see the captured Spanish treasure fleet. While crossing Haarlemmermeer, their boat was struck by a barge and capsized. Frederick was rescued but Frederick Henry drowned and his body was not found until the next day. He was buried in the Kloosterkerk, in the Hague.

== Ancestry ==
Ancestors of Frederick Henry, Hereditary Prince of the Palatinate

16. Frederick III, Elector Palatine
8. Louis VI, Elector Palatine
17. Marie of Brandenburg-Kulmbach
4. Frederick IV, Elector Palatine
18. Philip I of Hesse
9. Elisabeth of Hesse
19. Christine of Saxony
2. Frederick V, Elector Palatine
20. William I, Count of Nassau-Siegen
10. William I, Prince of Orange 'the Silent'
21. Juliana of Stolberg-Werningerode
5. Louise Juliana of Nassau
22. Louis, Duke of Montpensier
11. Charlotte of Bourbon
23. Jacqueline de Longwy
1. Henry Frederick, Hereditary Prince of the Palatinate
24. Matthew Stuart, Earl of Lennox
12. Henry Stuart, Lord Darnley
25. Margaret Douglas
6. James I of England
26. James V of Scotland
13. Mary, Queen of Scots
27. Mary of Guise
3. Elizabeth Stuart
28. Christian III of Denmark
14. Frederick II of Denmark
29. Dorothea of Saxe-Lauenburg
7. Anne of Denmark
30. Ulrich III of Mecklenburg-Güstrow
15. Sofie of Mecklenburg-Schwerin
31. Elizabeth of Denmark
