= Louise Hollandine of the Palatinate =

Louise Hollandine
- Abbess of Maubuisson
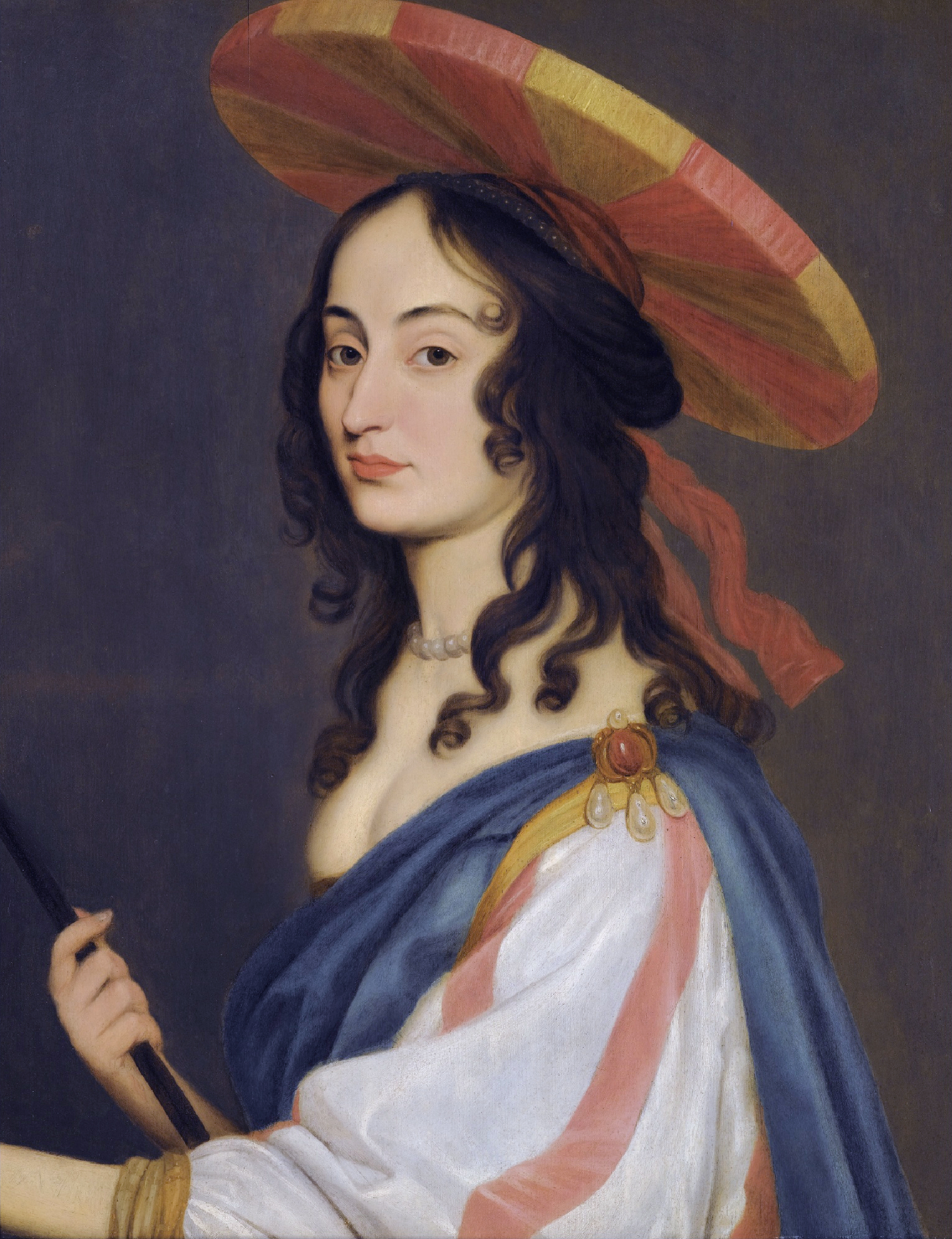
- Self portrait by Louise Hollandine, princess Palatine

Abbess of Maubuisson
- Reign: August 1664 – 11 February 1709
- Predecessor: Catherine III Angélique
- Successor: Charlotte II Joubert
- Born: 8 April 1622; Noordeinde Palace, The Hague, Dutch Republic
- Died: 11 February 1709 (aged 86); Maubuisson Abbey, Saint-Ouen-l'Aumône, Kingdom of France
- Burial: Maubuisson Abbey
Names
- Louise Hollandine
- House: Palatine-Simmern
- Father: Frederick V of the Palatinate
- Mother: Elizabeth Stuart
- Religion: Roman Catholic, prev. Protestant
- Occupation: Portrait painter, abbess

Princess Louise Hollandine of the Palatinate (18 April 1622 – 11 February 1709) was a painter and abbess. She was a daughter of Frederick V of the Palatinate, the "Winter King" of Bohemia, and Scottish princess Elizabeth Stuart, daughter of King James VI and I. She is also known for her romantic involvement with the Marquess of Montrose.

== Early life ==
Born in April 1622, Louise Hollandine was born at the Hague Palace in Holland, as her father was living in exile at the court of his uncle, Maurice, Prince of Orange. She was his sixth child and second daughter by his wife Princess Elizabeth Stuart, eldest daughter of King James VI and I of England and sister of King Charles I. Her parents had lost their Electoral lands and the crown of Bohemia, resulting in exile. She was given the name Hollandine to show appreciation to Frederick's uncles, the Princes of Orange, for protecting the family in exile.

She studied primarily in Leiden at the 'Prinsenhof', and reportedly began drawing lessons at age six, and became devoted to portraiture. She was taught in the Calvinist tradition according to the Heidelberg Catechism.

She received a marriage proposal from her cousin, Frederick William, Elector of Brandenburg when she was 17. However, while Elizabeth Stuart, Queen of Bohemia, gave her blessing, his parents disapproved, and so did Countess Louise Juliana of Nassau.

== Montrose romance ==
Louise is said to have had a love-affair with James Graham, 1st Marquess of Montrose (originally Earl of Montrose), a Scottish Cavalier soldier and poet. Montrose, a revered national hero, had made an agreement for Louise's hand in marriage should he be able to resecure the rule of Scotland for her cousin, Charles II, who was in exile at the time. Montrose won many outstanding military victories until ultimately being hanged and quartered in 1650, so the betrothal was never fulfilled.

== Conversion ==
For unknown reasons and to the dismay of her Protestant family, in December 1657 Louise fled to France with the assistance of her aunt by marriage Henrietta Maria of France and converted to the Roman Catholic faith. On 25 March 1659 she became a novice and on 19 September 1660 a nun in the Cistercian Maubuisson Abbey. With the support of King Louis XIV, she became Abbess of Maubuisson in August 1664. Her mother Elizabeth Stuart attempted to have Louise arrested and returned, and her conversion created lifelong animosity. Louise Hollandine was the only child to be left out of Elizabeth Stuart's will. Her brother Edward supported her conversion, as he had converted to Catholicism and lived in France, and had sent his daughters to be educated at the same abbey.

== Painting ==
Louise Hollandine was a talented portrait painter and graphic artist, a talent that she shared with her brother, Prince Rupert. She was student of Gerard van Honthorst and painted so ably in his style that some of her works were attributed to him.

As abbess, she continued painting and used her abbey's wealth and her family's lineage to make charitable donations to English Benedictine nuns, including a Madonna and Child painting she created in 1691, which was hung in the Lady Chapel.

As a painter, the princess is considered an "amateur". The portraits she painted are often in the Baroque style of Honthorst, but there are exceptions, which were likely not commissioned. Her works were generally kept within her family, and some can now be found in German museums.

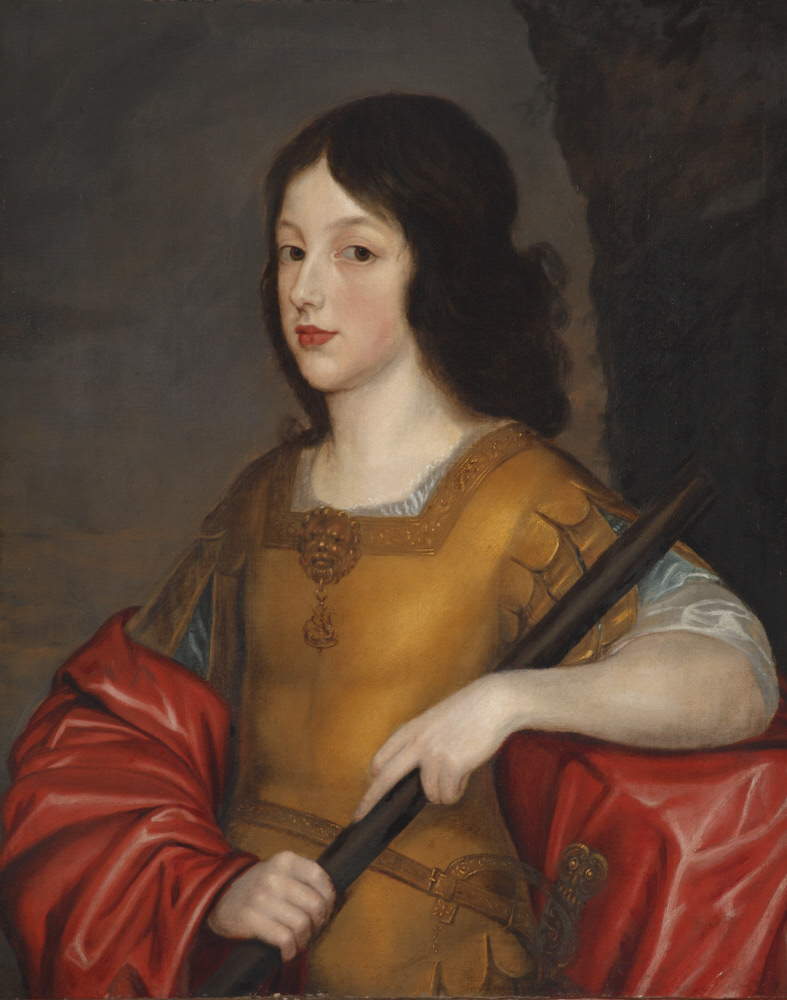
Prince Henry, Duke of Gloucester (1640–1660), 1650

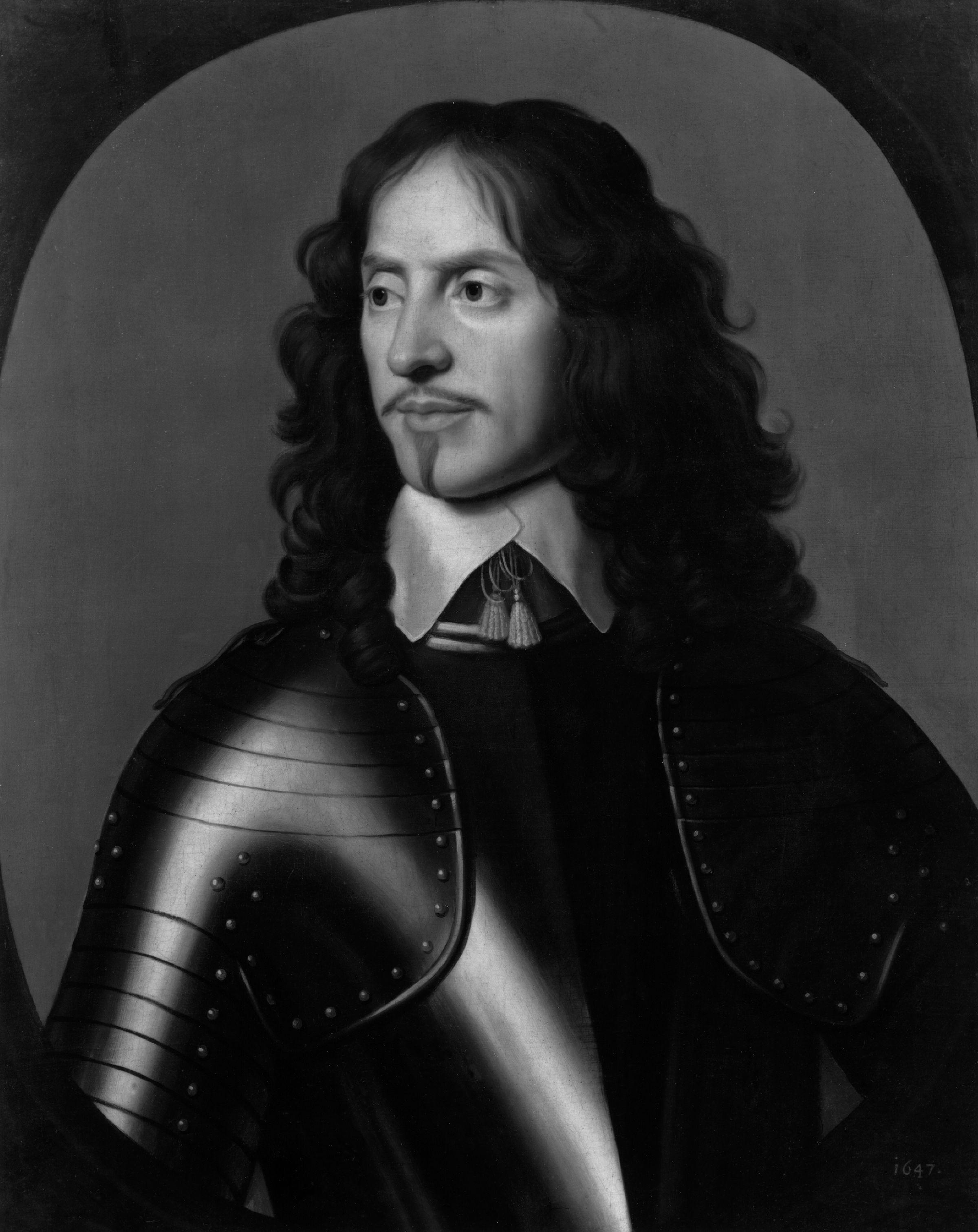
Portrait of William Craven, 1st Earl of Craven

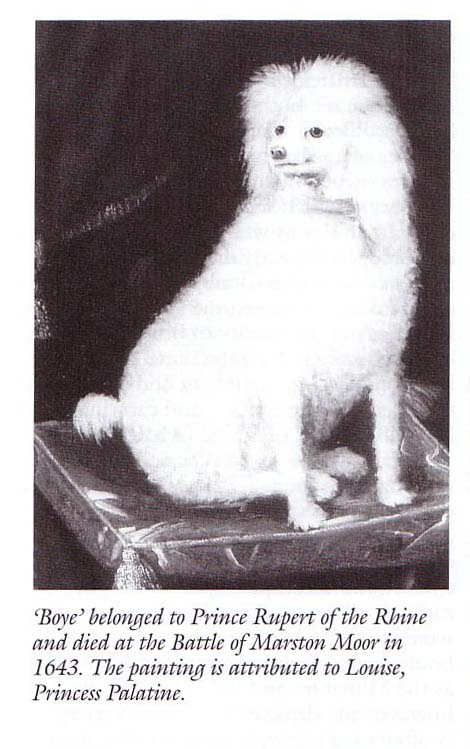
Dog (Boye or Puddle) said to belong to Prince Rupert of the Rhine, Duke of Cumberland, Killed at the Battle of Marston Moor in 1643

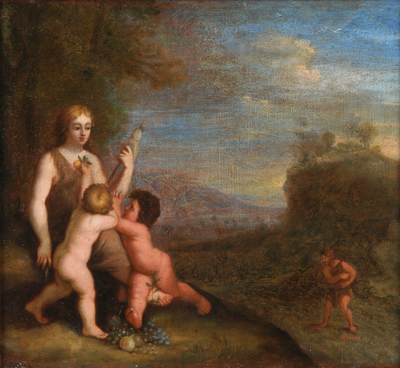
Adam and Eve with Cain and Abel, 1660

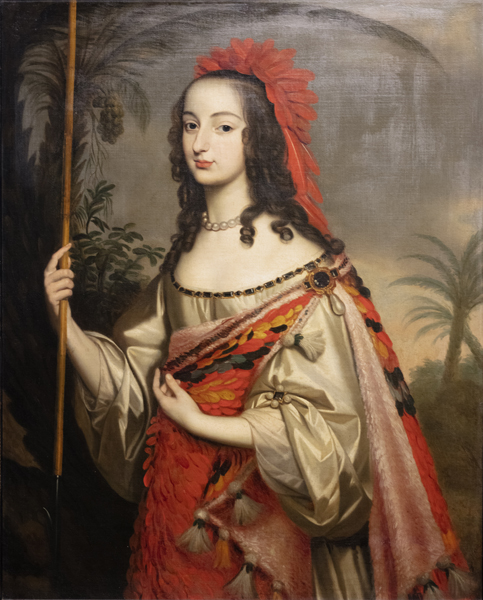
The portrait of her sister, Sophia of Hanover, 1644

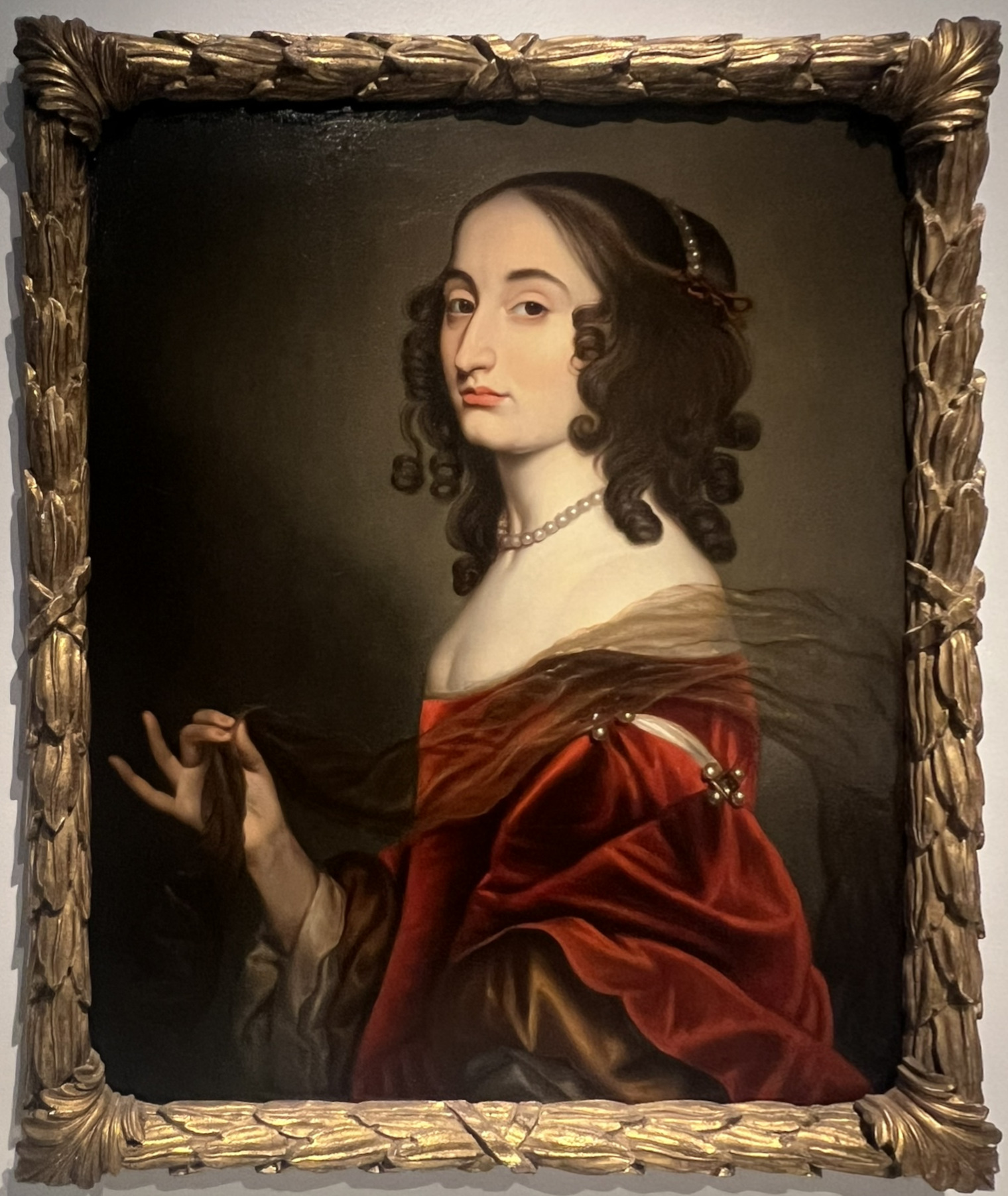
Self-portrait, after a painting by Gerard van Honthorst
(between circa 1650 and circa 1655)

== Ancestry ==
Ancestors of Louise Hollandine of the Palatinate

16. Frederick III, Elector Palatine
8. Louis VI, Elector Palatine
17. Marie of Brandenburg-Kulmbach
4. Frederick IV, Elector Palatine
18. Philip I, Landgrave of Hesse
9. Elisabeth of Hesse
19. Christine of Saxony
2. Frederick V, Elector Palatine
20. William I, Count of Nassau-Siegen
10. William the Silent
21. Juliana of Stolberg-Werningerode
5. Louise Juliana of Nassau
22. Louis III de Bourbon, Duke of Montpensier
11. Charlotte of Bourbon-Montpensier
23. Jacqueline de Longwy
1. Louise Hollandine of the Palatinate
24. Matthew Stewart, 4th Earl of Lennox
12. Henry Stuart, Lord Darnley
25. Margaret Douglas
6. James I of England, VI of Scotland
26. James V of Scotland
13. Mary Stuart, Queen of Scotland
27. Mary of Guise
3. Elizabeth Stuart
28. Christian III of Denmark
14. Frederick II of Denmark
29. Dorothea of Saxe-Lauenburg
7. Anne of Denmark
30. Ulrich III of Mecklenburg-Güstrow
15. Sophie of Mecklenburg-Güstrow
31. Elizabeth of Denmark

Regnal titles
| Preceded by Catherine III | Abbess of Maubuisson; 1667–1680 | Succeeded by Charlotte II |
