= Countess Louise Juliana of Nassau =

Electress Palatine from 1593 to 1610

Countess Louise Juliana
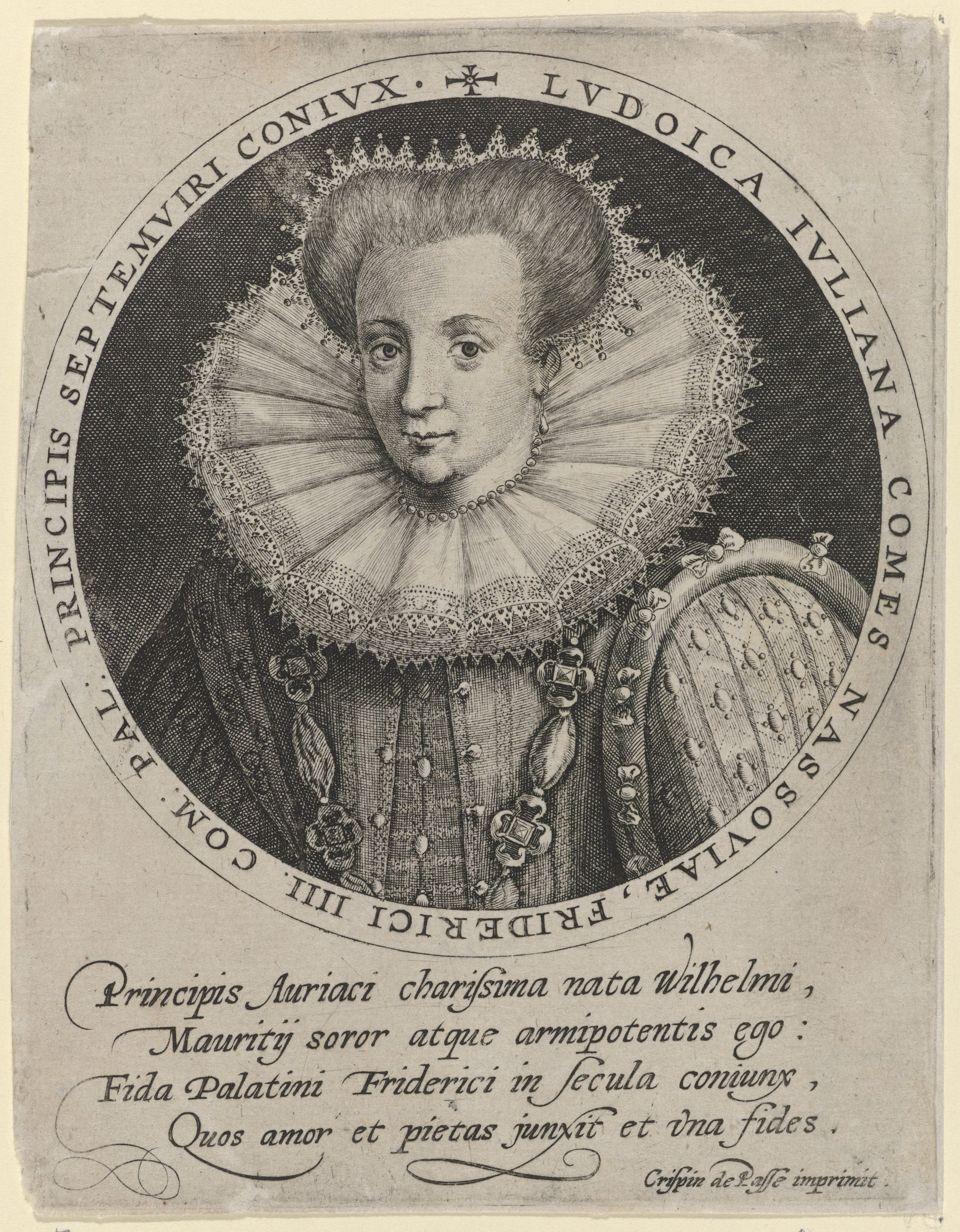
- Engraving c. 1593–1637

Electress Palatine
- Tenure: 23 June 1593 – 19 September 1610
- Born: 31 March 1576; Delft
- Died: 15 March 1644 (aged 67); Königsberg
- Spouse: Frederick IV, Elector Palatine (m. 1593; died 1610)
- Issue: Luise Juliane, Countess Palatine of Zweibrücken; Katharina Sofie; Frederick V, Elector Palatine; Elisabeth Charlotte, Electress of Brandenburg; Anna Eleonore; Louis William; Maurice Christian; Louis Philip, Count Palatine of Simmern-Kaiserslautern
- House: Nassau
- Father: William the Silent
- Mother: Charlotte of Bourbon

Louise Juliana of Orange-Nassau (31 March 1576 in Delft – 15 March 1644 in Königsberg) was Electress Palatine by marriage to Frederick IV, Elector Palatine, and took part in the regency government of her son between 1610 and 1614. She also acted as a mediator between the king of Sweden and the elector of Brandenburg in 1631.

== Biography ==
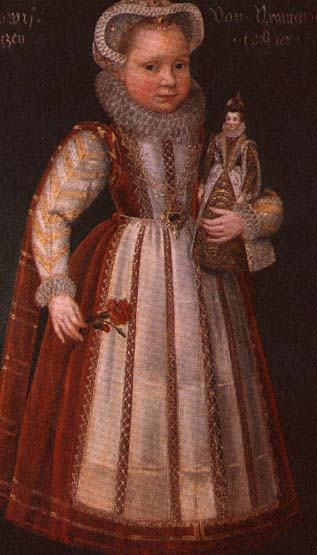
Louise Juliana during her childhood.

Louise Juliana was the first Dutch born member of the House of Orange-Nassau. She was the eldest daughter of William of Nassau, Prince of Orange and his third spouse Charlotte de Bourbon-Montpensier.

After her father was murdered in 1584, she and some of her five sisters were raised by their stepmother Louise de Coligny.

On 23 June 1593, Louise Juliana married Frederick IV, Elector Palatine of the Rhine. The marriage was arranged as a Protestant alliance between one of the most powerful Protestant German rulers and a member of a powerful Dutch Protestant dynasty and she was granted a dowry from both the Dutch estates and king Henry IV of France.

The marriage was not happy; Frederick IV was often drunk and unfaithful. Louise Juliana was nevertheless constantly pregnant, giving birth to eight children in just eight years; five of them lived to adulthood. She arranged for her children to be raised by her sister Elisabeth in the principality of Sedan, where they could be shielded from their father and given a Calvinist upbringing.

After the death of her husband in 1610, she took part in the regency government in the name of her son Frederick V, known as "the Winter King." While John II, Count Palatine of Zweibrücken was formally named regent, she took part in the government alongside him. She was instrumental in arranging the marriage between her son and Elizabeth Stuart in 1613. In 1614, her son was declared an adult and she retired to her dower estate in Kaiserslautern.

Louise Juliana tried to convince her son not to accept the Bohemian crown in 1618. When he left for Bohemia with his spouse, Louise Juliana was left in charge of her grandchildren, Charles Louis and Elizabeth, and returned to Heidelberg to act as the adviser of her son's regent John II, Count Palatine of Zweibrücken. In 1620, she was forced to flee the Palatinate, and escaped with her grandchildren to her daughter in Berlin (her grandchildren remained in her care until 1628).

When Berlin was besieged by King Gustavus Adolphus of Sweden in 1631, she was given power of attorney by her son-in-law the Elector of Brandenburg to negotiate, and managed to convince her son-in-law to give in to the Swedish king's demands, thereby saving Berlin from destruction. She left with the Brandenburg court to Königsberg in 1638.

== Issue ==
- Luise Juliane of the Palatinate (Heidelberg, 16 July 1594 - Meisenheim, 28 April 1640); married in 1612 to Pfalzgraf John II, Count Palatine of Zweibrücken.
- Katharina Sofie of the Palatinate (Heidelberg, 10 June 1595 - Köln an der Spree, 28 June 1626).
- Frederick V, Elector Palatine (Jagdschloß Deinschwang, 16 August 1596 - Mainz, 29 November 1632).
- Elisabeth Charlotte of the Palatinate (Neumarkt, 19 November 1597 - Crossen an der Oder, 26 April 1660); married in 1616 to Elector George William of Brandenburg.
- Anna Eleonore of the Palatinate (Heidelberg, 4 January 1599 - Heidelberg, 10 October 1600), died in childhood.
- Louis William of the Palatinate (Heidelberg, 5 August 1600 - Heidelberg, 10 October 1600), died in infancy.
- Maurice Christian of the Palatinate (Heidelberg, 18 September 1601 - Heidelberg, 28 March 1605), died in childhood.
- Louis Philip, Count Palatine of Simmern-Kaiserslautern (Heidelberg, 23 November 1602 - Krossen, 6 January 1655).

== Links ==
- "Louise Juliana, keurvorstin van de Palts" last accessed April 1, 2007

Countess Louise Juliana of Nassau House of Nassau Born: 31 March 1576 Died: 15 March 1644
Royal titles
Preceded by Anne of East Frisia	Electress Palatine; 1593–1610	Succeeded by Elizabeth Stuart
