= Adolf von Heydeck =

German painter

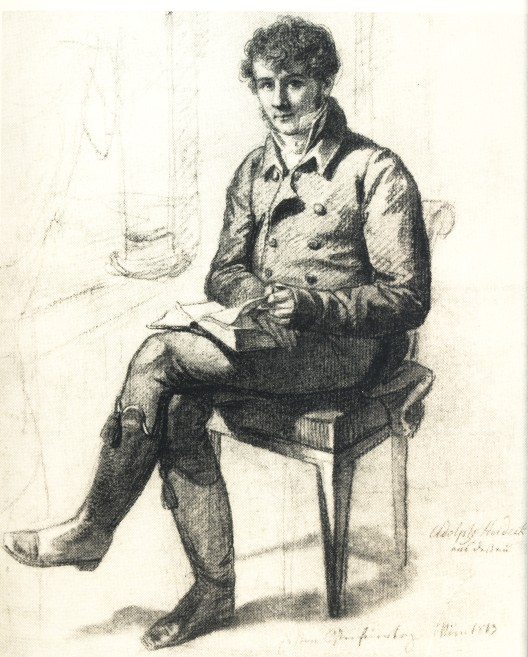
Portrait of Adolf von Heydeck by Carl Christian Vogel von Vogelstein

Gustav Adolf (Adolph) Heideck, from 1836 von Heideck (25 April 1787 – 23 January 1856) was a German painter. A classmate of Friedrich and Ferdinand Olivier in his native Dessau, he studied at the Hauptschule there with Carl Wilhelm Kolbe. Apart from this he is not known to have any formal training, and is referred to in documentation as an "Autodidakt" and "Dilettant", or amateur, in painting and etching. From 1813 to 1820 he was in Rome, and he returned there in 1837. He also traveled to Terni and to Naples, and is known to have been in Olevano in 1820. He died in Dessau.
