= Marianne Schmidl =

Austrian ethnologist, teacher, librarian and art collector

Marianne Schmidl (3 August 1890 in Berchtesgaden – April 1942 in the Izbica Ghetto) was the first woman to graduate with a doctorate in ethnology from the University of Vienna. An Austrian ethnologist, teacher, librarian and art collector, Schmidl was plundered and murdered in the Holocaust by the Nazis because of her Jewish origins.

== Family and education ==
Marianne Schmidl's mother, Maria Elisabeth Luise Friedmann (1858–1934), lived in Munich, and worked for the writer Paul Heyse. Schmidl's great-grandfather was the painter Friedrich von Olivier, a close friend of Julius Schnorr von Carolsfeld, and her great-granduncles were the brothers Heinrich Olivier and Ferdinand Olivier, who were also artistically active. Her father, Josef Bernhard Schmidl (1852–1916), of Jewish origin, was a court lawyer from Vienna and a social democrat. Shortly before the marriage on 23 July 1889, which was vehemently rejected by the Friedmann family, he converted to Protestantism. The Jewish background of her father would prove fateful for Schmidl when the Nazis came to power.

Marianne was the oldest of two sisters in Berchtesgaden, where the family-owned a holiday home. However, she grew up in Vienna and received the best possible education for girls at the time. From 1905 to 1909 she attended the progressive “Black Forest School” of the pedagogue and salonière Eugenie Schwarzwald.

From 1910, Schmidl studied mathematics and theoretical physics at the University of Vienna. In the winter semester of 1913–14, however, she switched to ethnology as a major, anthropology and prehistoric archeology as a minor. Shortly before that she had joined the Association for Austrian Folklore and had worked out a folklore topic for the first time with “Flax growing and flax processing in Umhausen”. Michael Haberlandt and Rudolf Pöch were among her teachers. In 1916 she was the first woman to receive her doctorate.

== Working life ==
Marianne Schmidl first worked at the Berlin Museum of Ethnology. From autumn 1917 she worked under Theodor Koch-Grünberg at the Linden Museum in Stuttgart as an “assistant for African questions”. After a stint at the Grand Ducal Museum for Art and Applied Arts in Weimar, Marianne Schmidl was unable to find an adequate job for a long time. Michael Haberlandt later asked whether “the two characteristics female and Jewish were an obstacle to filling a position within ethnology”. From March 1921 she worked at the Austrian National Library, with a permanent civil servant position from 1924, as a lecturer for anthropology, science, mathematics and medicine. In addition, she continued her scientific research in the field of African cultural history, specializing in particular in basket weaving. From 1926 she worked on a research project on African handicrafts at the Museum für Völkerkunde in Vienna, which was financed by the Saxon Research Institute for Ethnology in Leipzig. In the course of this, she researched ethnographic museums in Switzerland, France, England, Belgium, Germany and Italy and published numerous scholarly works.

== Nazi persecution and deportation ==
After Austria's Anschluss or "annexation" to the Nazi German Reich in 1938, Marianne Schmidl was declared Jewish because her father was Jewish, even though she considered herself to be Christian. She was forced out of her job, and thrown into poverty by the special taxes Nazis inflicted on Jews in order to take their property. Schmidl was forced to sell her family's artworks but was unable to flee. In April 1942, she was deported to the Izbica ghetto in Poland and from there presumably to the Belzec or Sobibor concentration camps.

Her last sign of life was in May 1942. The circumstances and exact date of her death are unknown, and she was not declared dead until May 1950.

== Art collection and its restitution ==
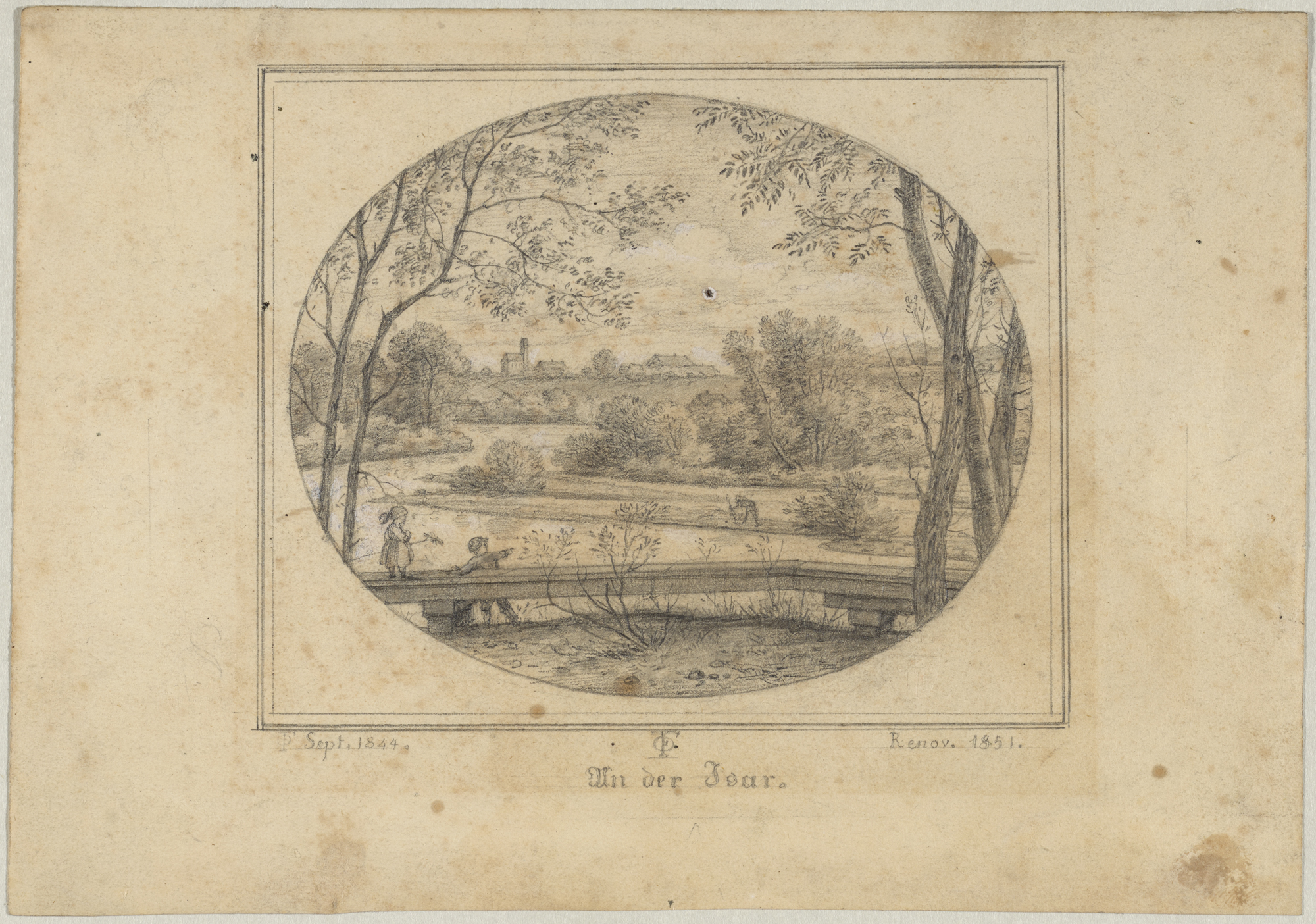
An der Isar, an 1844 drawing by Friedrich Olivier, restituted by the Lenbachhaus in Munich

Marianne Schmidl is remembered today not only as Austria's first Ph.D. in ethnology, but also because – in the course of the principles for the restitution of looted art formulated at the 1998 Washington Conference – she was the original owner of many drawings by the brothers Olivier and Julius Schnorr von Carolsfeld could be made out.

After her mother's death in 1934, she inherited the entire family collection of drawings by the Olivier brothers and Schnorr von Carolsfeld. After the "Anschluss" of Austria in 1938, Schmidl was forced to submit a property declaration on 30 September 1938 for her art collection on which the Nazi imposed special taxes. The special taxes for Jews, the repayment of the funding for their research, and the reduced salary collectively left Maria Schmidl with no choice but to sell the collection of drawings.

Her non-Jewish brother-in-law, Karl Wolf, brought the lot to the Viennese dealer Christian Nebehay, who in turn passed them on to the Leipzig action house C. G. Boerner.

On 28 April 1939, 19 sheets belonging to Schmidl were auctioned anonymously as “Collection W” (today identified as “Collection Wolf”).

The Albertina in Vienna restituted 8 sheets by Friedrich Olivier to the family's heirs in 2013.

In 2014, two more drawings by Olivier from the Kupferstichkabinett in Berlin in 2015 two sheets from the Kupferstichkabinett in Dresden were restituted.

In 2016 'A Branch with Shriveled Leaves' which had been sold under duress by Schmidl in Austria in 1939, was restituted by the National Gallery of Art. The NGA had acquired the drawing as part of the Wolfgang Ratjen collection.

In 2019 a drawing by Friedrich and another by Ferdinand Olivier were restituted from the Lenbachhaus in Munich.

== Publications (selection) ==
- 1913 Flachs-Bau und Flachs-Bereitung in Umhausen. In: Zeitschrift für Österreichische Volkskunde. Band 19, 1913, S. 122–125.
- 1915 Zahl und Zählen in Afrika. In: Mitteilungen der Anthropologischen Gesellschaft in Wien, Band 45, 1915, S. 166–209. This work (her dissertation) was fundamental to a new approach, which considered mathematics as a universal science, independent of culture and society. She stated that there are rather completely different types and expressions of counting and calculating.
- 1928 Altägyptische Techniken an afrikanischen Spiralwulstkörben. In: Festschrift für Wilhelm Schmidt, (SVD), S. 645–654.
- 1935 Die Grundlagen der Nilotenkultur. In: Mitteilungen der Anthropologischen Gesellschaft in Wien. Band 65, 1935, S. 86–125. (The last essay she published)
- 2005 (Posthum) Afrikanische Spiralwulstkörbe. In: Katja Geisenhainer: Maria Schmidl (1890–1942), Leipzig 2005, S. 265–339.

== Literature ==
- F. Hillbrand-Grill: "Schmidl (Theresie) Marianne". In: Österreichisches Biographisches Lexikon 1815–1950 (ÖBL). Vol. 10, Austrian Academy of Sciences, Vienna 1994, ISBN 3-7001-2186-5, p. 325.
- Susanne Blumesberger: Verlorenes Wissen. Ein gewaltsam abgebrochener Lebenslauf am Beispiel von Marianne Schmidl. In: Helmut W. Lang (Hrsg.): Mirabilia artium librorum recreant te tuosque ebriant. Phoibos, Wien 2001, ISBN 3-901232-27-3, S. 9–19.
- Doris Byer: Marianne Schmidl. In: Brigitta Keintzel, Ilse Korotin (Hrsg.): Wissenschafterinnen in und aus Österreich. Leben – Werk – Wirken. Böhlau, Wien/Köln/Weimar 2002, ISBN 3-205-99467-1, S. 655–658.
- Katja Geisenhainer: Marianne Schmidl (1890–1942). In: Zeitschrift für Ethnologie. Band 127, 2002, S. 269–300.
- Katja Geisenhainer: Marianne Schmidl (1890–1942). Das unvollendete Leben und Werk einer Ethnologin. Universitätsverlag, Leipzig 2005, ISBN 3-86583-087-0 (enthält auch Schmidls unvollendet gebliebene Arbeit über afrikanische Spiralwulstkörbe).
- Katja Geisenhainer: Jüdische Lebenslinien in der Wiener Völkerkunde vor 1938: Das Beispiel Marianne Schmidl, in: Andre Gingrich; Peter Rohrbacher (Hg.), Völkerkunde zur NS-Zeit aus Wien (1938–1945): Institutionen, Biographien und Praktiken in Netzwerken (Phil.-hist. Kl., Sitzungsberichte 913; Veröffentlichungen zur Sozialanthropologie 27/1). Wien: Verlag der ÖAW 2021, S. 153–206. doi:10.1553/978OEAW86700
- Katja Geisenhainer: Verfolgung, Deportation und Ermordung: Die letzten Lebensjahre von Marianne Schmidl, in: Andre Gingrich; Peter Rohrbacher (Hg.), Völkerkunde zur NS-Zeit aus Wien (1938–1945): Institutionen, Biographien und Praktiken in Netzwerken (Phil.-hist. Kl., Sitzungsberichte 913; Veröffentlichungen zur Sozialanthropologie 27/3). Wien: Verlag der ÖAW 2021, S. 1553–1582. doi:10.1553/978OEAW86700
- Ilse Korotin: „[...] vorbehaltlich eines jederzeit zulässigen Widerrufes genehmigt“. Ausgrenzung und Verfolgung jüdischer Wissenschafterinnen und Bibliothekarinnen. In: Österreichische Bibliothekarinnen auf der Flucht. Verfolgt, verdrängt, vergessen? Praesens, Wien 2007, ISBN 978-3-7069-0408-7, S. 103–126.

== See also ==
- Aryanization
- The Holocaust in Austria
- List of Claims for Restitution for Nazi-looted art
- Ethnology
- Jewish women in the Holocaust
- Gender bias on Wikipedia
