= The Last Judgment (Memling) =

Triptych by Hans Memling

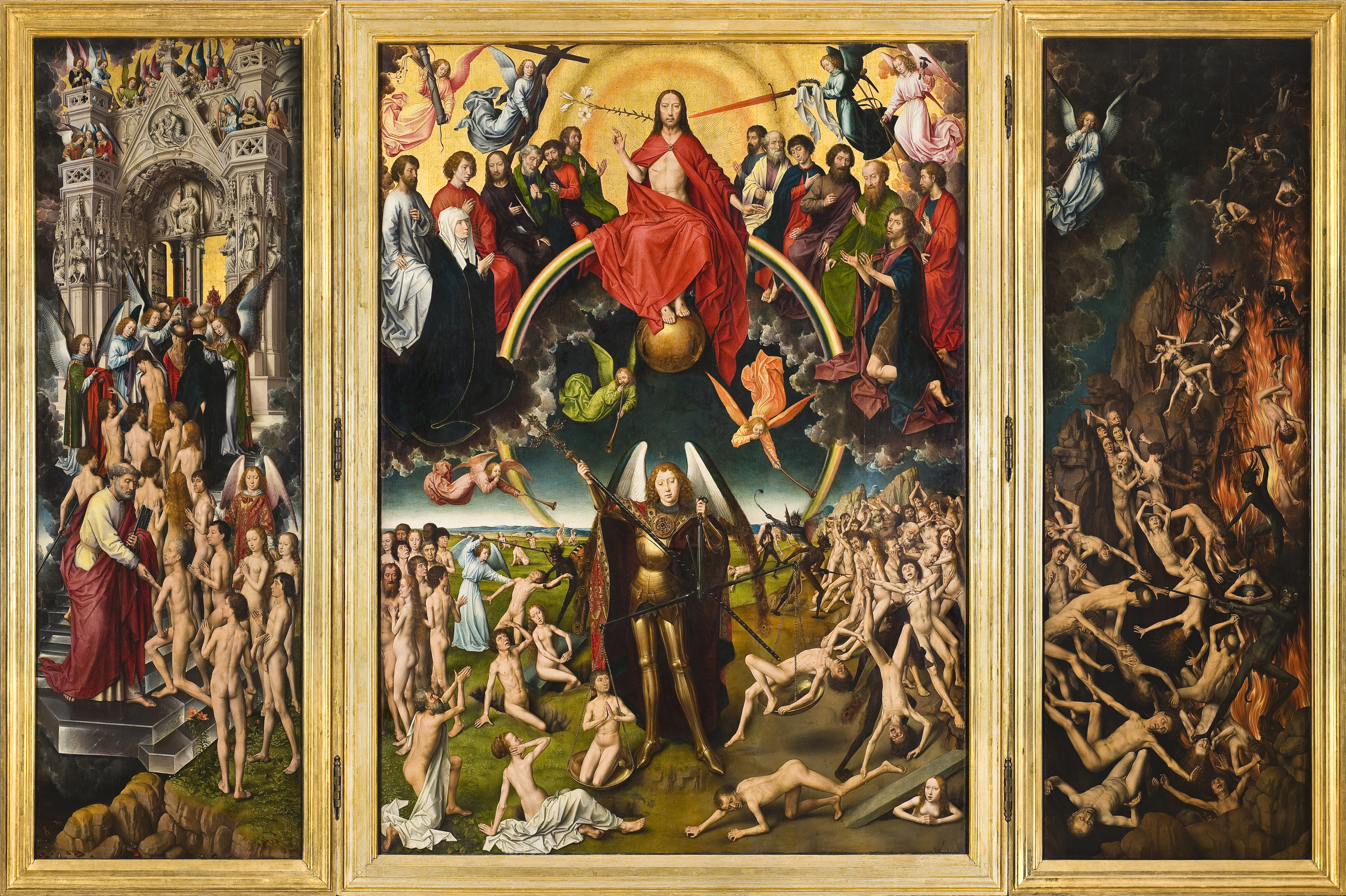
- Artist: Hans Memling
- Year: c. 1467
- Medium: oil on panel
- Dimensions: 223.5 cm × 306 cm (88.0 in × 120 in)
- Location: National Museum, Gdańsk, Poland

The Last Judgment is a triptych attributed to Flemish painter Hans Memling and was painted between 1467 and 1471, and depicts Last Judgment during the second coming of Jesus Christ. The central panel shows Jesus sitting in judgment on the world, while St Michael the Archangel weighs souls: he sends the damned towards Hell (the sinner in St. Michael's right-hand scale pan is a donor portrait of Tommaso Portinari); the left-hand panel shows the saved being guided into heaven by St Peter and the angels.

== History and provenance ==
The triptych was commissioned by Angelo Tani, an agent of the Medici at Bruges for the Chapel of St Michael at Badia Fiesolana, but was captured at sea by Paul Beneke, a privateer from Danzig. The privateer gave the painting to his patrons who were lay brothers of the Brotherhood of Saint George and donated it to their church. A lengthy lawsuit against the Hanseatic League demanded its return to Italy but it remained in the Basilica of the Assumption until 1807. During its stay in the church, several monarchs attempted to buy or move the painting, such as Duke Charles the Bold of Burgundy, Emperor Rudolf II and Tsar Peter I of Russia.

The artwork was among the many looted during the Napoleonic Wars and put on display in the Musée Napoléon (Louvre). The german artists Ferdinand and Heinrich Olivier later commented on its presence in the museum, with Ferdinand letting out tears of joy at seeing the masterpiece. German newspapers also reported on its presence and tended to highlight how well it fared in comparison with all the other artwork surrounding it. It remained in Paris for eight years, under museum inventory number 563, and mislabled as a work by Jan Van Eyck. The triptych was taken to Berlin in 1815, despite the objections raised by Vivant Denon, and then returned to its original location.

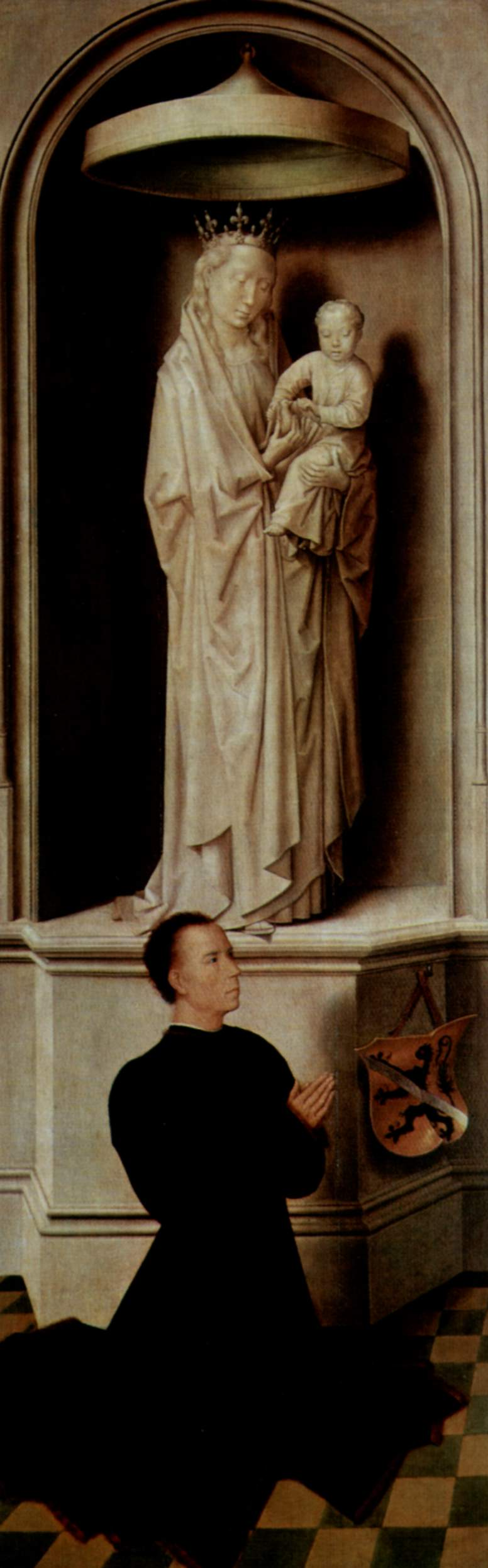
Donor portrait by Angelo di Jacopo Tani ; above it, the Virgin Mary with Child.

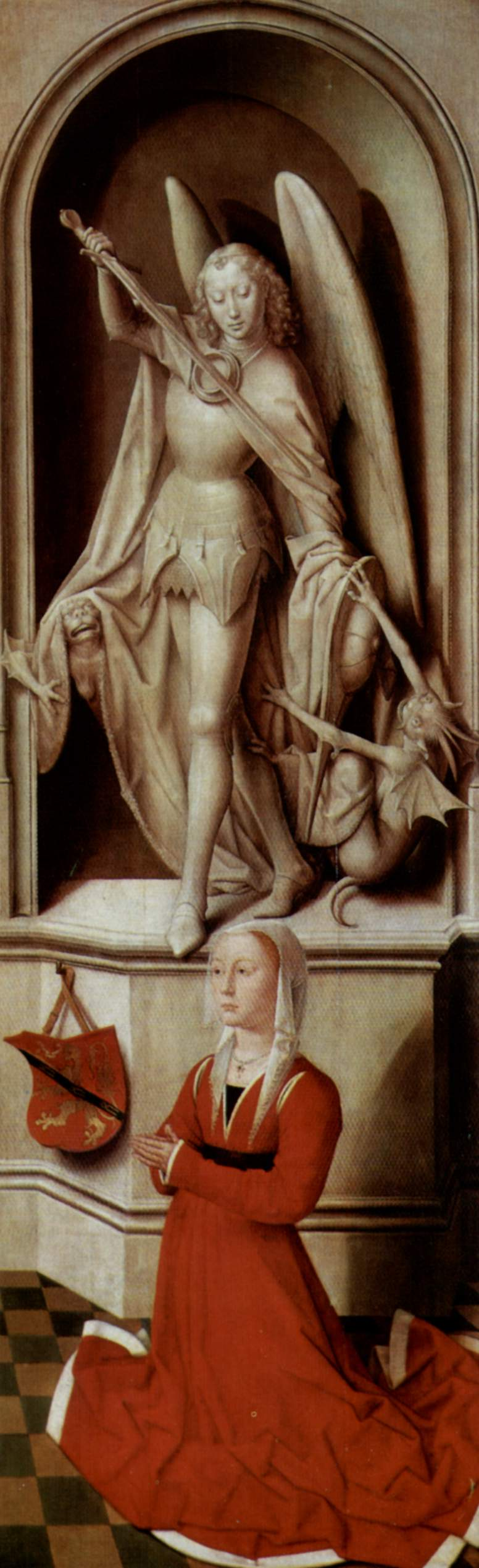
Donor portrait of his wife Caterina di Francesco Tangeli ; above it, the Archangel Michael.

In 1942, antecipating Allied bombing during World War 2, the curator of the National Museum Willi Drost evacuated the painting from the city. The artwork then moved between different locations in attempt to keep it hidden. In 1946, it was discovered by the Red Army and sent to the Hermitage Museum in Leningrad where it remained for ten years. In 1956, it was sent to Warsaw, where it saw extensive renovation, and then returned to Gdansk's Museum where it still remains.

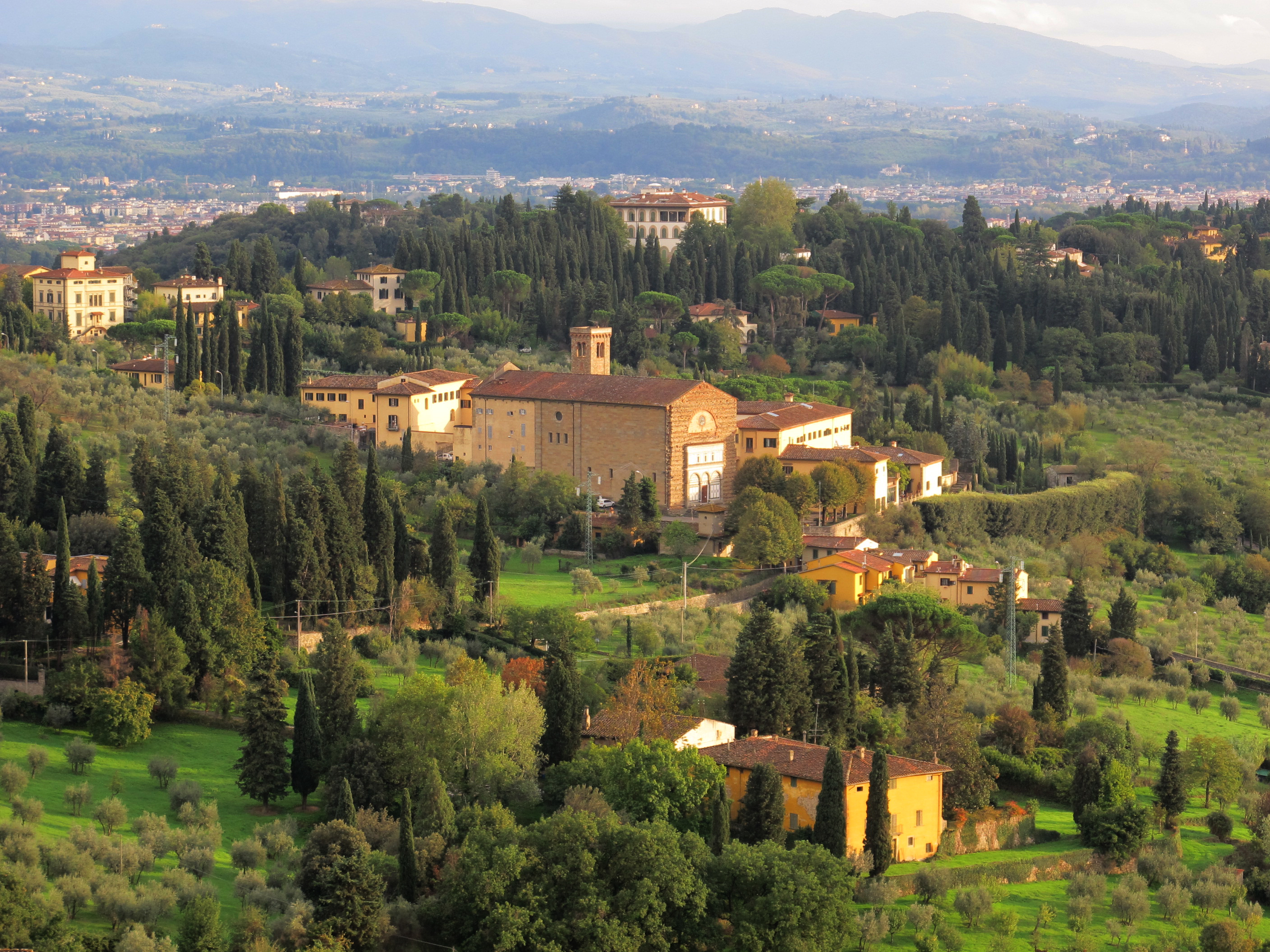
Badia Fiesolana, the intended home of the painting, which it never reached.
