= Julius Schnorr von Carolsfeld =

German painter (1794–1872)

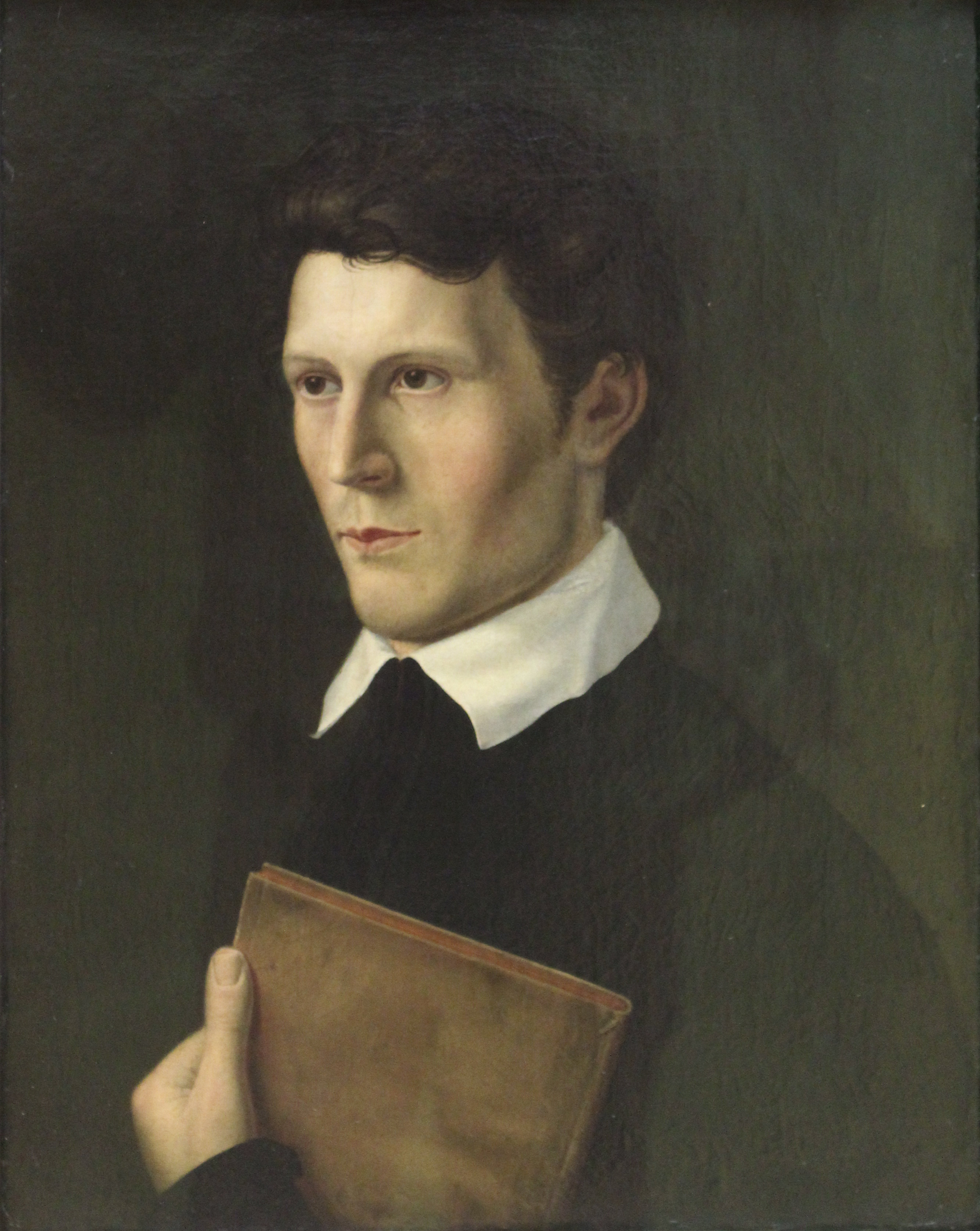
- Portrait of Von Carolsfeld as a young man (1820), by Friedrich von Olivier, Albertinum
- Born: 26 March 1794; Leipzig, Kingdom of Saxony, Holy Roman Empire
- Died: 24 May 1872 (aged 78); Dresden, Kingdom of Saxony, German Empire
- Occupation: Painter

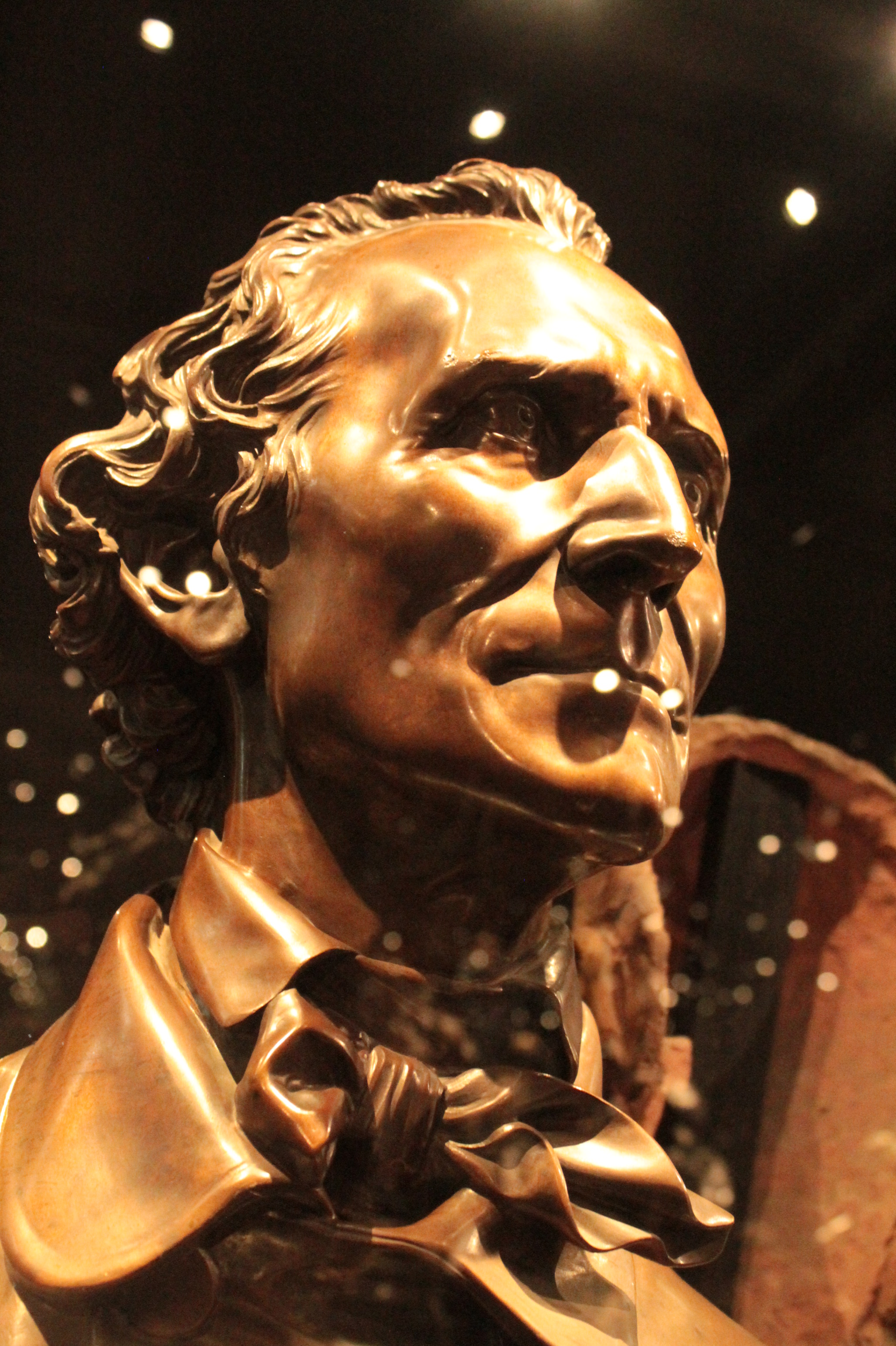
Julius Schnorr von Carolsfeld by Adolf von Donndorf, c.1913, Albertinum gallery, Dresden

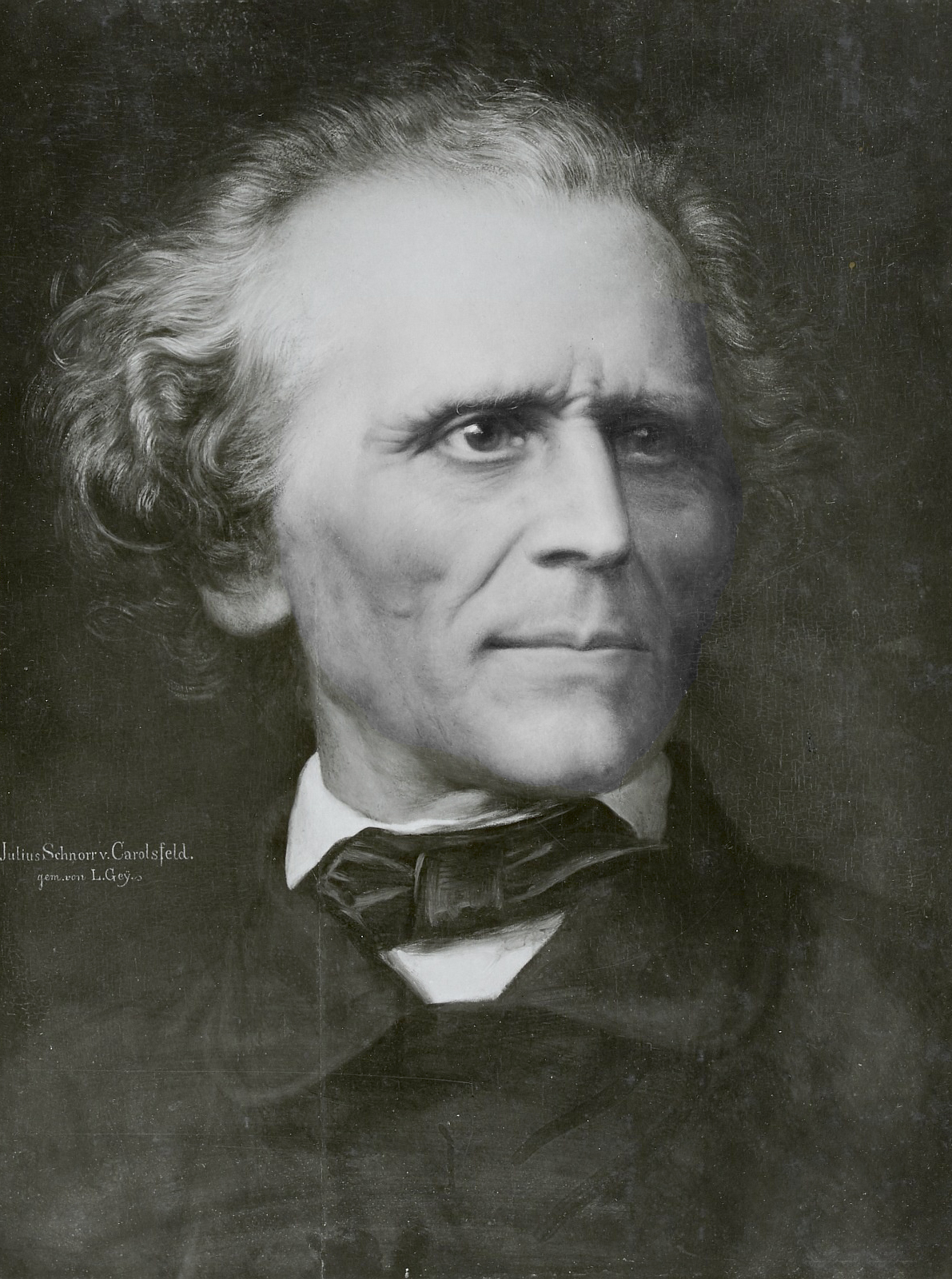
Julius Schnorr von Carolsfeld by Leonhard Gey

Julius Schnorr von Carolsfeld (26 March 1794 – 24 May 1872) (German pronunciation: [ˈjuːli̯ʊs ʃnɔʁ fɔn ˈkaːʁɔlsfɛlt]) was a German painter, chiefly of Biblical subjects. As a young man he associated with the painters of the Nazarene movement who revived the florid Renaissance style in religious art. He is remembered for his extensive Picture Bible, and his designs for stained glass windows in cathedrals.

== Biography ==
Schnorr was born in Leipzig, the son of Veit Hanns Schnorr von Carolsfeld (1764–1841), a draughtsman, engraver, and painter, from whom he received his initial artistic education, his earliest known works being copies of the Neoclassical drawings of John Flaxman. In 1811 he entered the Vienna Academy, from which Johann Friedrich Overbeck and others who rebelled against the old conventional style had been expelled about a year before. There he studied under Friedrich Heinrich Füger, and became friends with Joseph Anton Koch and Heinrich Olivier, both of whom would have an important influence on his style. Schnorr followed Overbeck and the other founders of the Nazarene movement to Rome in 1815, where the colony of artists lived in the abandoned San Isidoro monastery.. This school of religious and romantic art tended to reject modern styles, attempting to revert to and revive the principles and practice of earlier periods.

At the beginning of his time in Rome, Schnorr was particularly influenced by his close study of fifteenth-century Italian painting, especially the works of Fra Angelico. Soon however, he abandoned this refined simplicity, and began to look towards more elaborate High Renaissance models.

From its outset the Nazarene movement made an effort to recover fresco painting and monumental art, and Schnorr had an opportunity to demonstrate his powers when commissioned to decorate the entrance hall of the Villa Massimo near the Lateran with frescoes illustrating the works of Ariosto. Other cycles in the house were begun by Peter von Cornelius and Johann Friedrich Overbeck.

Schnorr married Maria Heller, the stepdaughter of Ferdinand Olivier, in 1827. Their son Ludwig Schnorr von Carolsfeld was an operatic tenor who died at the age of 29. He had just begun to gain renown as the first to sing Wagner's Tristan. Schnorr's brother, Ludwig Ferdinand (1788–1853) was also a painter. Schnorr died in Dresden in 1872.

== Career ==
The second period of Schnorr's artistic output began in 1825, when he left Rome, settled in Munich, entered the service of Ludwig I of Bavaria, and transplanted to Germany the art of wall-painting which he had learned in Italy. He showed himself qualified as a sort of poet-painter to the Bavarian court; he organized a staff of trained executants, and covered five halls in the new palace – the "Residenz" – with frescoes illustrating the Nibelungenlied. He also painted a series of scenes from the lives of Charlemagne, Frederick Barbarossa and Rudolph of Habsburg.

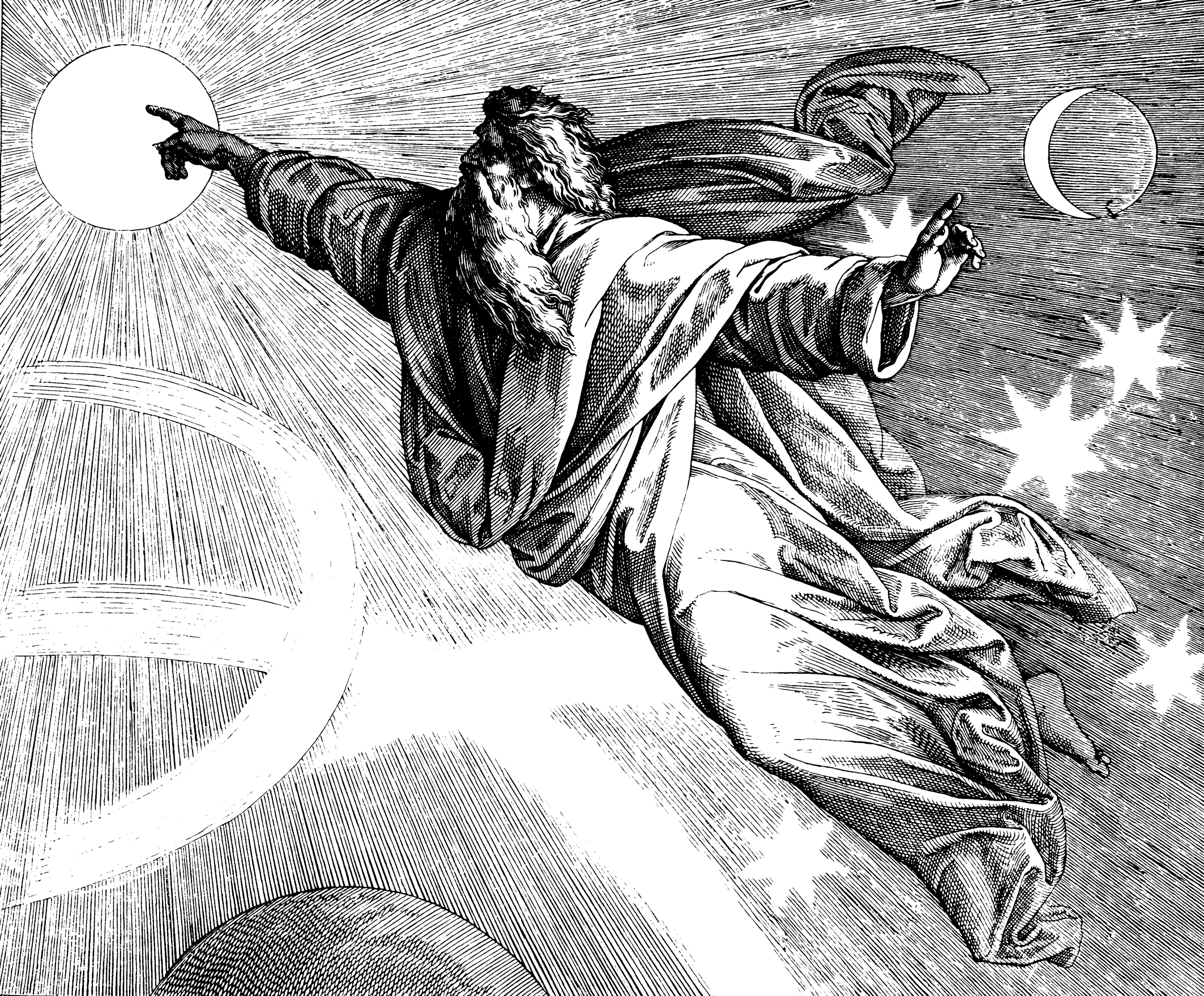
Illustration from the Picture Bible

Schnorr had initially wanted to create a complex symbolic programme in which these German historical subjects were combined with scenes from the Old Testament. This however was rejected by Ludwig, leaving Schnorr to complain that he was left with the task of painting a mere "newspaper report of the Middle Ages" ("Zeitungsartikel des Mittelalters"). Critics considered these compositions to be creative, learned in composition, masterly in drawing, but also exaggerated in thought and extravagant in style.

In 1846 Schnorr moved to Dresden to become a professor at the academy there. The next year he was appointed director of the Gemäldegalerie.

== Art ==
Schnorr's third period was marked by his biblical illustrations. He was a Lutheran, and took a broad and unsectarian view. His Picture Bible was published in Leipzig in 30 parts in 1852–60, and an English edition followed in 1861. The Picture Bible illustrations were often complex and cluttered; some critics found them lacking in harmony of line and symmetry, judging them to be inferior to equivalent work produced by Raphael. His style differs from the simplicity and severity of earlier times, exhibiting instead the floridity of the later Renaissance.

Schnorr's biblical drawings and cartoons for frescoes formed a natural prelude to designs for church windows, and his renown in Germany secured commissions in Great Britain. Schnorr was one of ten artists who provided designs for a scheme of stained-glass for Glasgow Cathedral, commissioned in 1856–7 and manufactured at the royal factory in Munich, and he later designed windows for St Paul's Cathedral in London. This Munich glass provoked controversy: medievalists objected to its lack of lustre, and stigmatized the windows as mere coloured blinds and picture transparencies. The opposing party, however, claimed for these modern revivals "the union of the severe and excellent drawing of early Florentine oil-paintings with the colouring and arrangement of the glass-paintings of the latter half of the 16th century." Four windows by Schnorr were installed at St Paul's: three in the chancel (removed in 1888) and one at the west end (destroyed in 1941). Most of the Munich glass at Glasgow was removed during the 20th century.

== Paintings ==
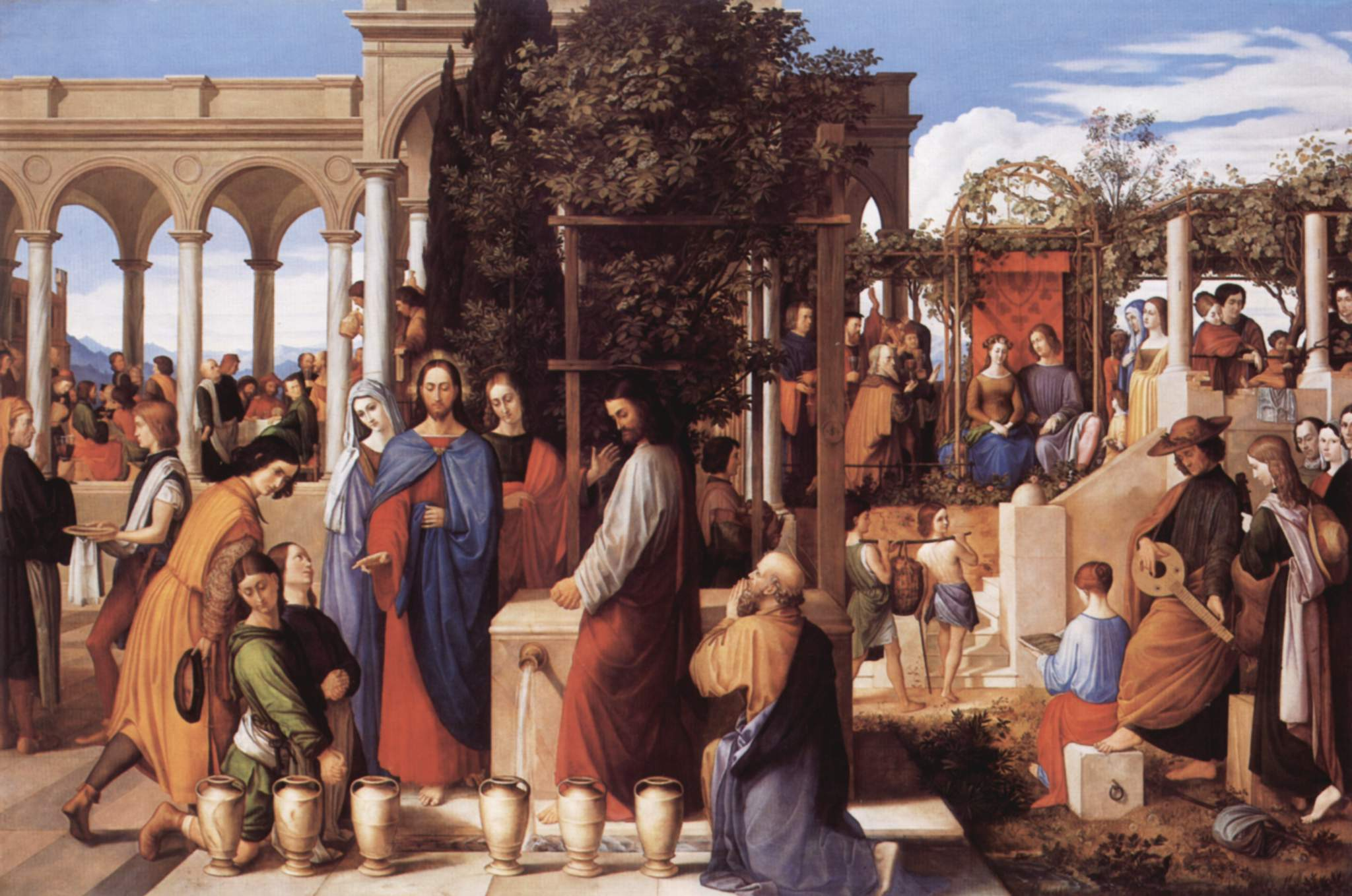
The Wedding at Cana (1819)

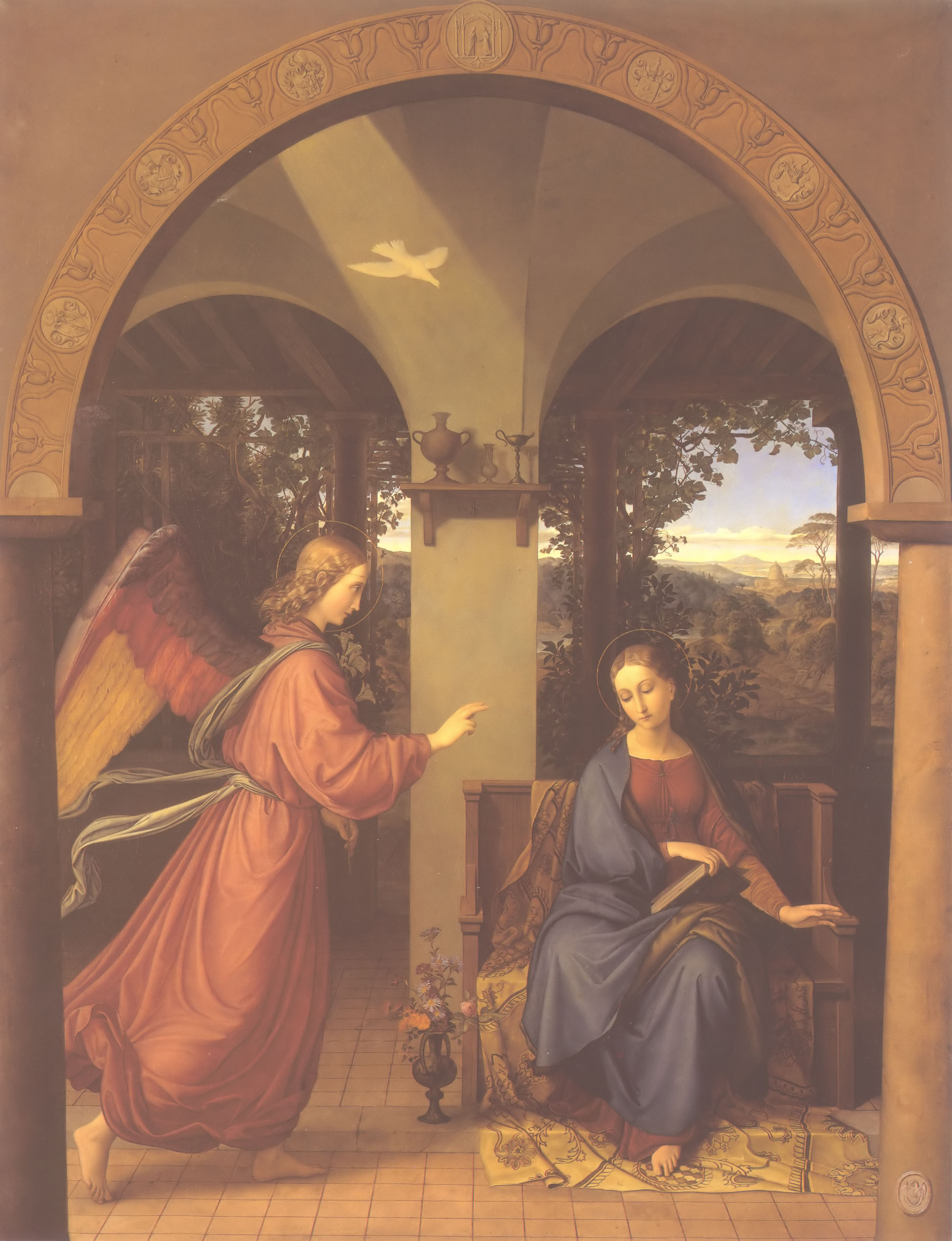
Annunciation (1820)

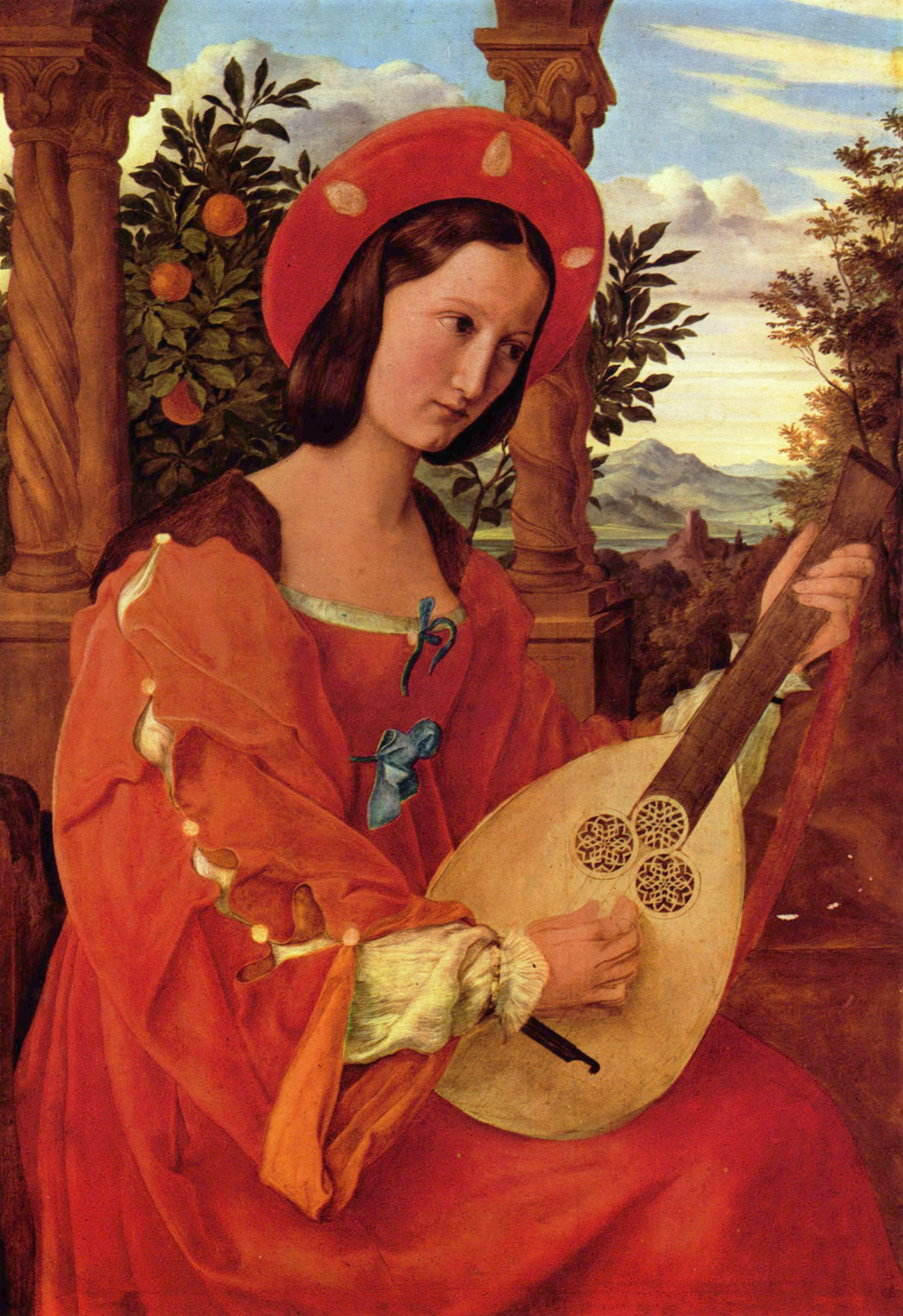
Portrait of Klara Bianka von Quandt (1820)

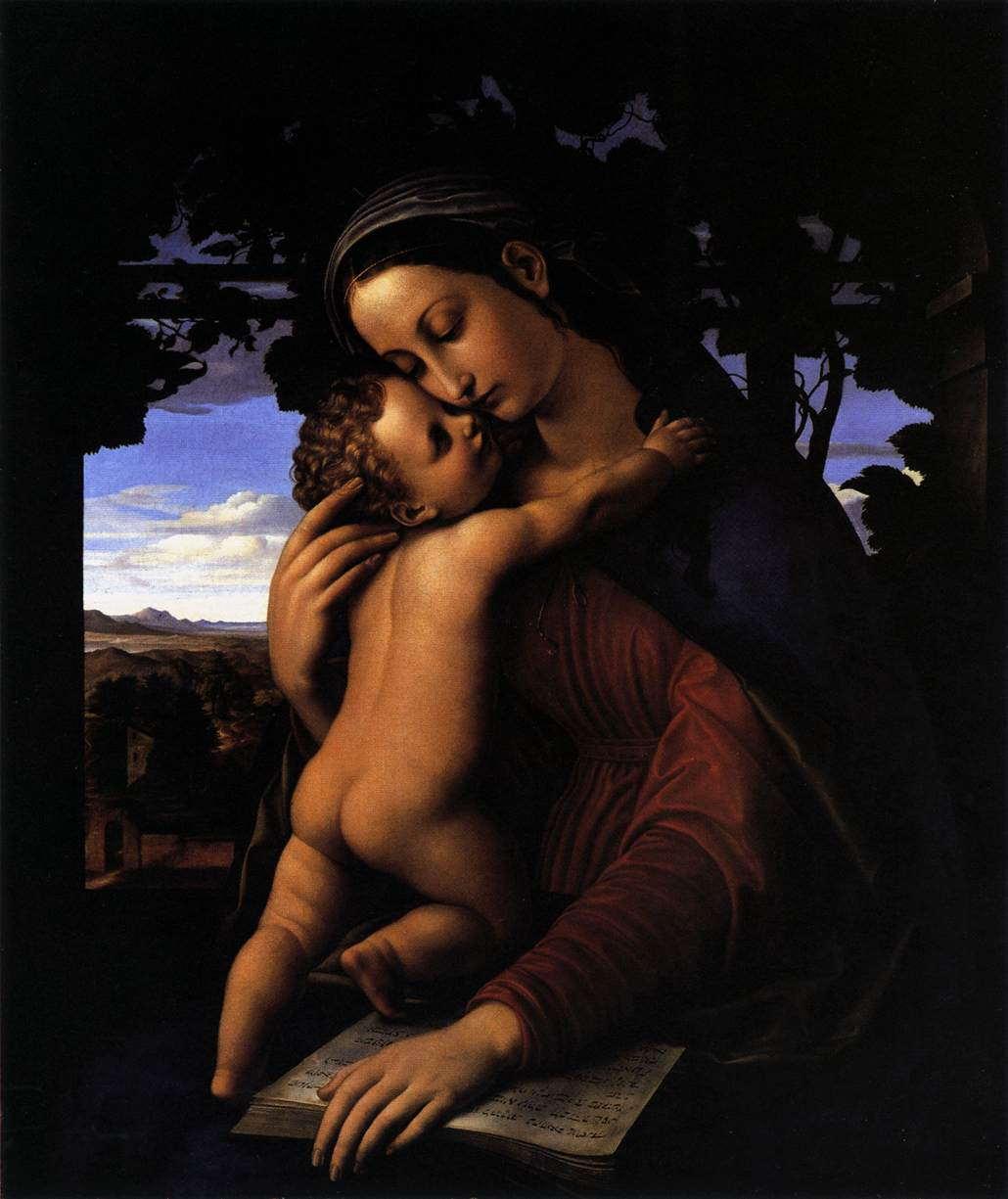
Madonna and Child (1820)

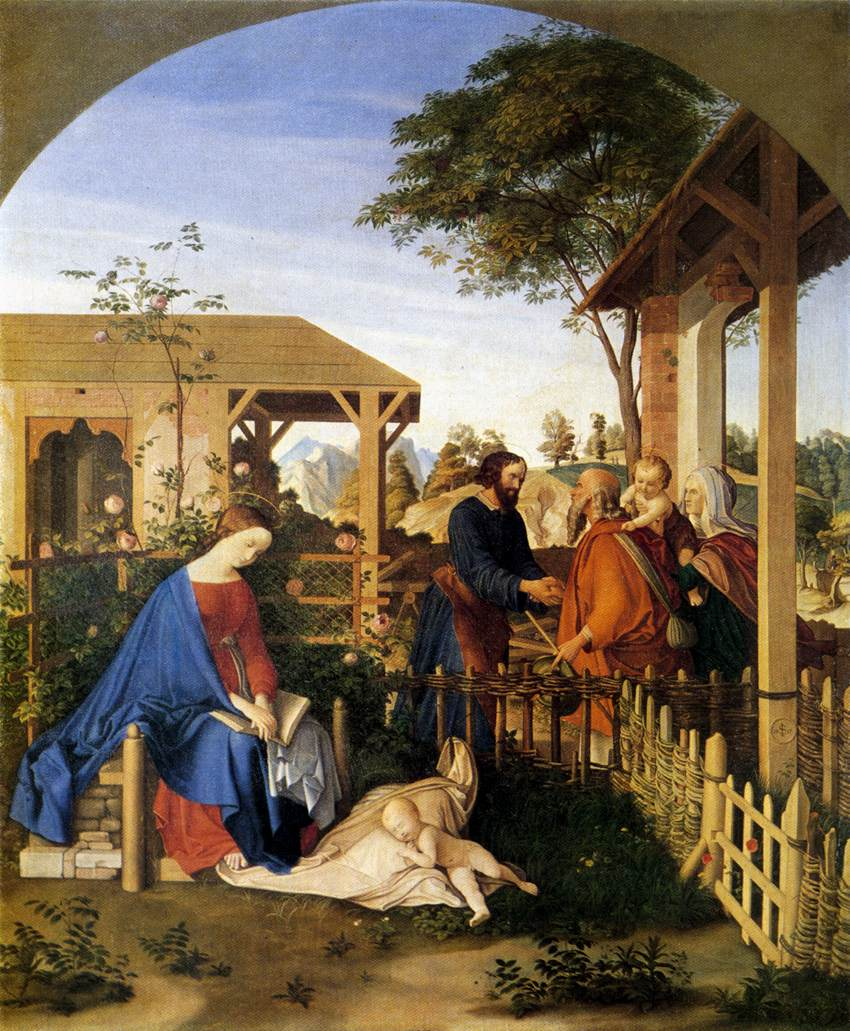
The Family of St John the Baptist Visiting the Family of Christ (1817)

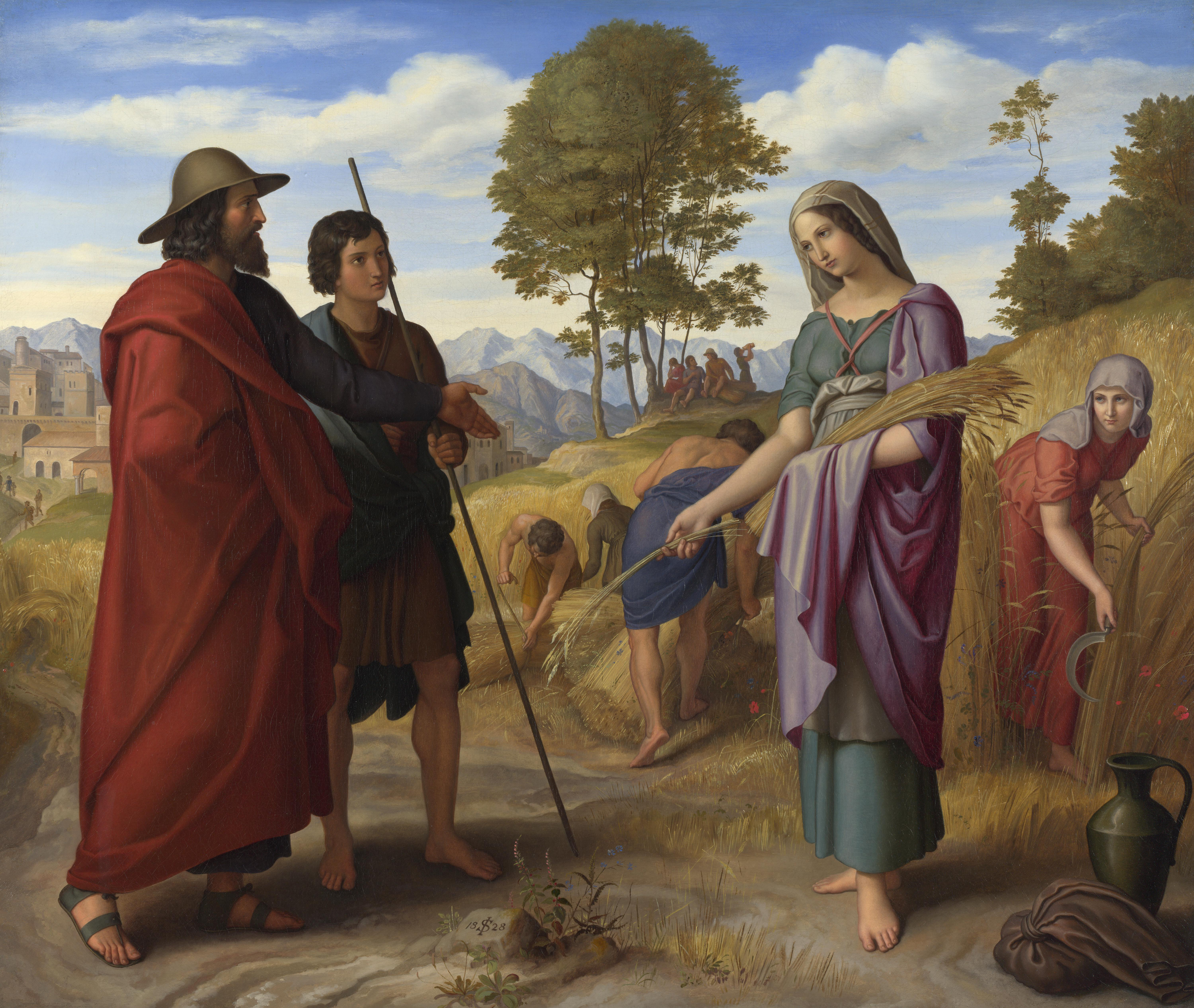
Ruth in Boaz's Field (1828)

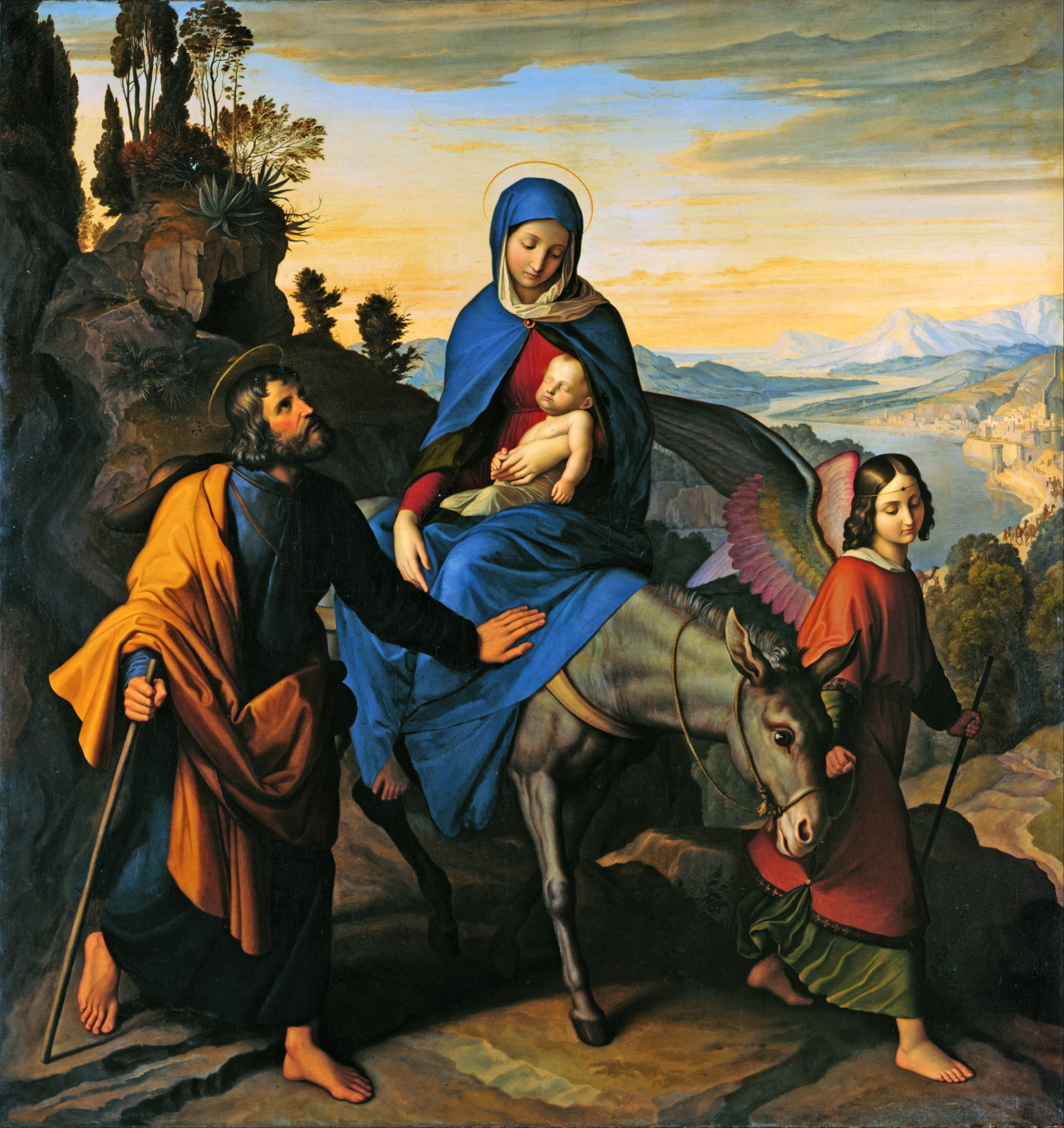
Flight into Egypt (1828)

== Nazi-looted art ==
In August 2016, the National Gallery of Art in Washington, D.C., returned a drawing in its collection, A Branch with Shriveled Leaves (1817) by Schnorr, to the heirs of Dr. Marianne Schmidl (1890–1942), an Austrian ethnologist who was murdered in the Holocaust.
