= Charles de Graimberg =

French curator, collector and artist

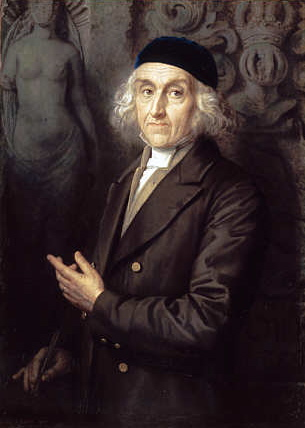
Portrait of de Graimberg

Louis Charles François de Graimberg (30 July 1774 – 10 November 1864), also known as Carl de Graimberg, was a French curator, collector and artist.

== Life ==
He was born in the château de Paars, son of Gilles-François de Graimberg de Belleau. He joined the École royale militaire at Rebais but emigrated with his family in May 1791. He fought in the War of the First Coalition in the Compagnie de la noblesse de Champagne and the Chasseurs Nobles de Damas, before becoming an officer in the Régiment de Mortemart. After leaving active service he and his family settled on Guernsey and travelled across Europe.

He had a passion for drawing and in 1807 settled in Paris, where he studied under Jean-Victor Bertin. In 1810 he went to Karlsruhe to study under Christian Haldenwang, Baden's court engraver. He settled at Heidelberg (where he later died) to draw the ruins of Heidelberg Castle, devoting the rest of his life to their protection and restoration, creating a series of engravings of them and convincing Leopold, Grand Duke of Baden to repair part of them. He also became a friend of Helmina von Chézy.

== Works ==
- Das Heidelberger Faß (1816)
- Notice de l'entreprise des vues de Heidelberg (1820)
- Collection des Vues de Heidelberg. Dessinées d'apres nature par Charles de Graimberg (1817/18)
- Vues lythographiées de la ruine, de la ville et des environs de Heidelberg (1820)
- Notice de l'entreprise des vues de Heidelberg (1820)
- Livraison des vues de Heidelberg. Dessinées d'apres nature par Charles de Graimberg, mises en perspective par Thomas Alfred Leger, professeur d'architecture à l'université de Heidelberg, et gravées par Charles Haldenwang, graveur de la Cour de Bade (1821–1825)
- Collection des Vues de Heidelberg, de la vallé du Neckar, de Schwetzingen, de Bade et du Rhin (1825)
- Collection de vues à l'aquatinte de la ville et du château de Heidelberg (1825)
- Le guide des voyageurs dans la ruine de Heidelberg d'après un plan du château (1827)
- Vues du jardin de Schwetzingen (1828)
- Histoire du gros tonneau de Heidelberg (1828)
- Ansichten von Heidelberg, Schwetzingen, Baden und vom Rhein (1828/29)
- Antiquités de Château de Heidelberg, dessinées d'après nature par Charles de Graimberg, mises en perspective par Thomas Alfried Leger, gravées par Texier (1830)
- Collection de vues à l'aquatinte de Heidelberg et du Rhin (1830)
- Ansichten des Heidelberger Schlosses, des Wolfsbrunnens, von Stift Neuburg, Dilsberg und Neckarsteinach. Dessiné par Charles de Graimberg (1830)
- Les grandes Planches du chateau de Heidelberg dessinées et publiées par Charles de Graimberg (1830/31)
- Die Statuen der achtzehn Stammhäupter des kurpfalz-baierischen Fürstenhauses auf dem Heidelberger Schlosse (1831)
- Annonce de la troisième exposition des collections d'antiquités palatines et badoises appartenant à Monsr. le Comte Chs. de Graimberg (1831–1840)
- Le guide de voyageurs dans la ruine de Heidelberg
- Vues de la Ville, du Château et des Environs de Heidelberg (1837/39)
- Notice de la Galerie des Antiquités du Château de Heidelberg (1842)
- Les gravures de Heidelberg et la Galerie des Antiquités du Château de Heidelberg (1847)
- Guide dans les Ruines du Chateau de Heidelberg, orné d'un plan et de vues gravées. Extrait du guide des voyageurs du professeur Dr. Th. Alfr.
- Statues des princes de la Maison Palatine-Bavarovise sur la Chapelle du Chateau de Heidelberg

== Sources ==
- (in German) Anja-Maria Roth, Louis Charles François de Graimberg (1774-1864): Denkmalpfleger, Sammler, Künstler, 1999
- (in German) Manfred Berger, Graimberg-Bellau, Maria Antoinette Josephine Theresia Franziska Gräfin von, in "Biographisch-Bibliographisches Kirchenlexikon" (BBKL), 2003
