= Ferdinand Olivier =

German painter

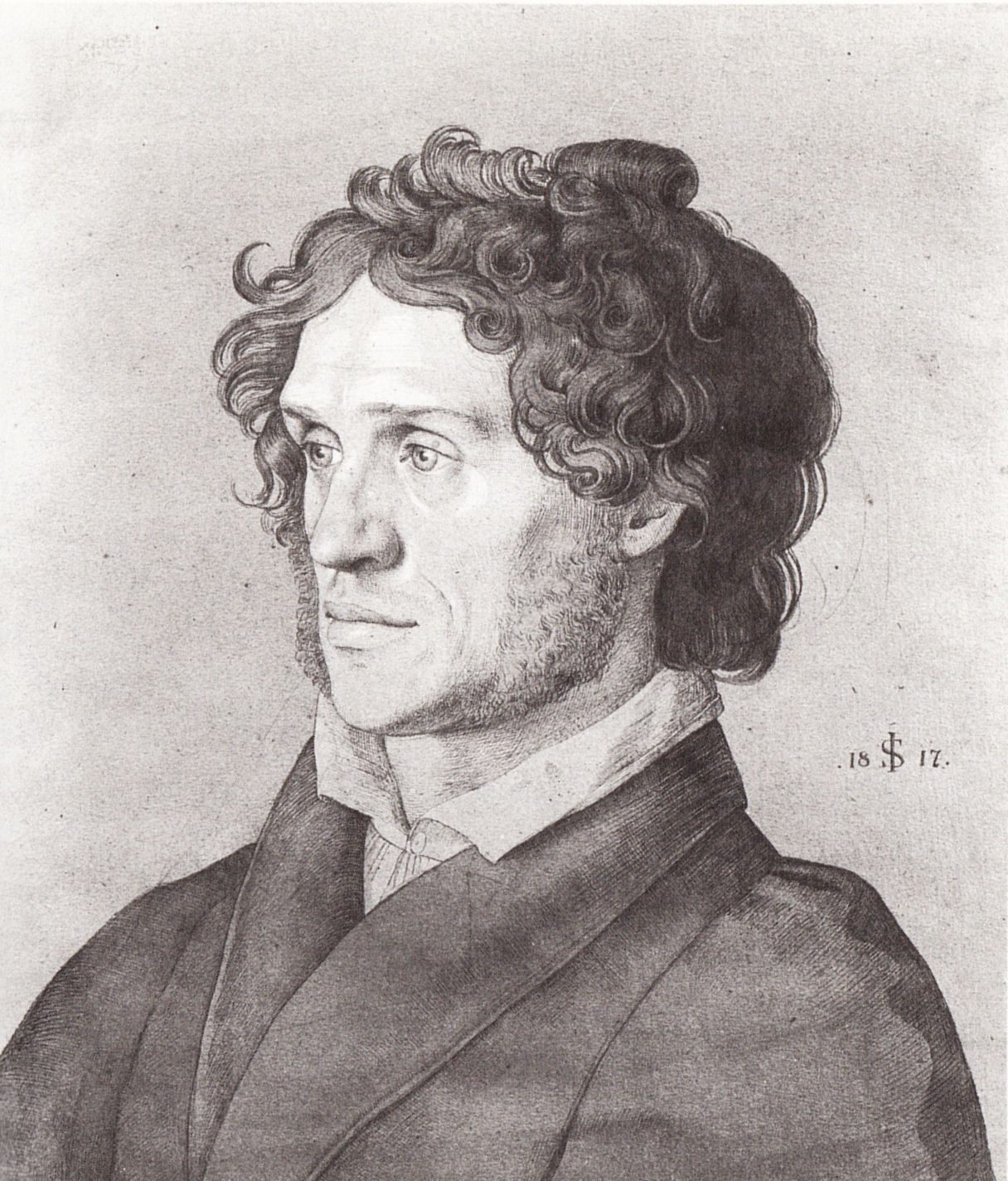
Portrait of Olivier by Julius Schnorr von Carolsfeld (1817)

Johann Heinrich Ferdinand Olivier (1785–1841) was a German painter associated with the Nazarene movement.

== Life ==
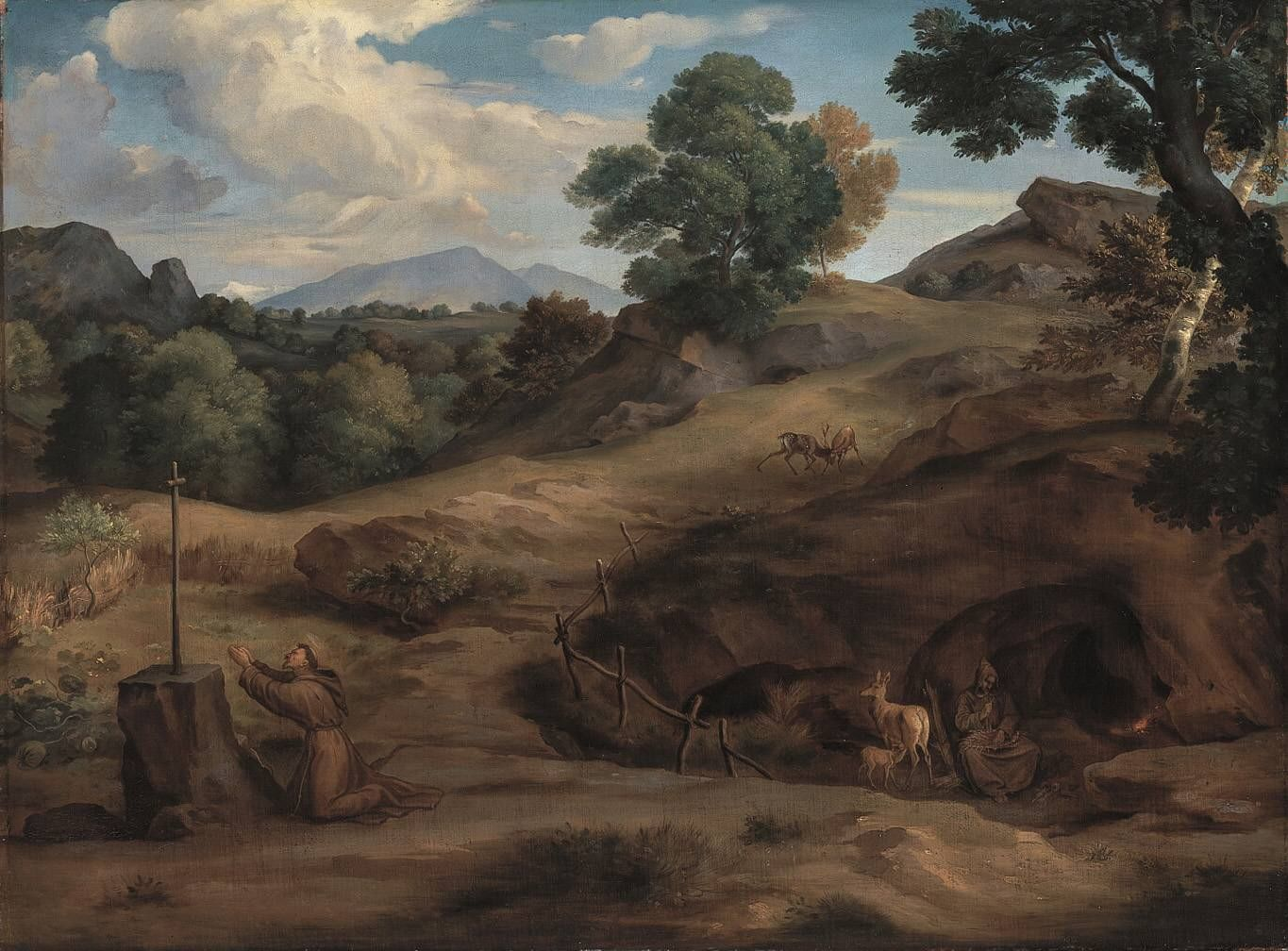
Southern Landscape with Hermits

Olivier was born in Dessau on 1 April 1785, to a family of Swiss-French descent. He began his artistic education in 1801 by taking drawing lessons from Carl Wilhelm Kolbe, and also studied with the woodblock printers Christian Haldenwang and Johann Friedrich Unger. In 1804 he moved to Dresden with his brother Heinrich. There he studied with Jacob Wilhelm Mechau and Karl Ludwig Kaaz, copied old masters in the Gemäldegalerie, and got to know the artists Caspar David Friedrich and Philipp Otto Runge.

Between 1807 and 1810 he was employed on a diplomatic mission to Paris in the service of Prince Leopold Friedrich Franz von Anhalt-Dessau. While there he often visited the Louvre, particularly admiring the works of Northern Renaissance artists such as Jan van Eyck and Hans Memling, who had a profound effect on his style. While still in Paris he painted, in collaboration with his brother Heinrich, two works for the chapel on the Prince's estate at Wörlitz and began a life-sized portrait of Napoleon on his horse, which he seems only to have finished after leaving the city.

In 1810 he returned to Dessau. He then toured the Harz Mountains with his brother, Friedrich, before settling in Vienna in 1811. There he got to know, and came under the influence of, the landscape painter Joseph Koch. Fritz Novotny contrasts Olivier's paintings of this period – "artificial landscapes with their wings – typical Nazarene work" – with the precise, closely observed drawings he made of the suburbs of Vienna at the same time in which he shows "by means of things small and insignificant in themselves, the might of the invisible forces of nature, the infinity and silence of space".

Olivier visited Salzburg in 1815 and 1817, making drawings which, in 1822, he used as the basis of a series of lithographs in the which Austrian landscapes form the background to Christian iconography. In 1817 he became a member of the "Lukasband" (usually translated as the "Brotherhood of Saint Luke"), a fraternity of artists, often known as the "Nazarenes", which had been founded by Friedrich Overbeck and Franz Pforr eight years earlier. Olivier was the only member of the group never to have visited Italy.

In 1830 he moved to Munich, where, three years later, he was appointed secretary of the academy and professor of art history. He died at Munich on 11 February 1841.

His two younger brothers Friedrich and Heinrich were also artists. His great-niece was Dr. Marianne Schmidl (1890 in Berchtesgaden; died April 1942 in the Holocaust), the first woman to graduate with a doctorate in Ethnology from the University of Vienna.

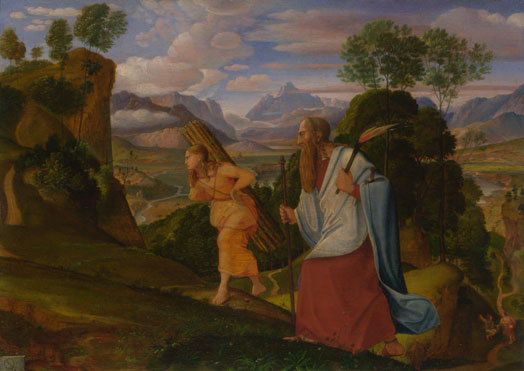
Abraham and Isaac (1817)

== Nazi-looted art ==
In January 2015, the Kupferstich-Kabinett of the Staatliche Kunstsammlungen Dresden restituted Olivier's Wilted Leaves to the heirs of Dr. Marianne Schmidl, who was plundered and murdered in the Holocaust

== Sources ==
- German Masters of the Nineteenth Century: Paintings and Drawings from the Federal Republic of Germany. Catalogue of an exhibition held at the Metropolitan Museum of Art, New York, 1981. Free download available.
- Novotny, Fritz (1978) [1960]. Painting and Sculpture in Europe. The Pelican History of Art. Harmondsworth: Penguin Books. ISBN 014056120X.
