= Carl Wilhelm Kolbe the Younger =

German painter

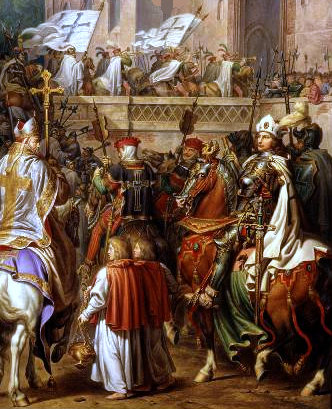
The Entrance of Grand Master Siegfried von Feuchtwangen and his Knights

Carl Wilhelm Kolbe (7 March 1781, Berlin - 8 April 1853, Berlin) was a German painter. He was generally referred to as The Younger to distinguish him from his uncle, the etcher and art teacher, Carl Wilhelm Kolbe.

== Life and work ==
He studied at the Prussian Academy of Arts with Daniel Chodowiecki. His first large historical work, "Froben's Death at the Battle of Fehrbellin", a pastel painting, earned him a prize from the Academy in 1796.

His oil paintings were heavily influenced by the Dutch Masters. His monumental work in that style, "Albrecht Achilles Conquers a Flag Near Nuremberg" (1806), was purchased by the city of Berlin as a present for Princess Louise, when she left on a tour of the Netherlands.

Also notable are an "Ascension of Jesus" for the church at Sanssouci palace, frescoes depicting scenes from the Nibelungenlied at the Marmorpalais, "Otto I Battling the Hungarians", and "Barbarossa's Corpse near Antioch", at the Berlin National Gallery. He was known for his meticulous attention to detail when rendering Medieval costumes.

For the ten decorated windows at Ordensburg Marienburg, he created both the color sketches and the finished kartons; depicting the battles and victories of the Teutonic Order.

From 1815 to 1853 he was a member of the Prussian Academy, was named a Professor in 1830, and was on the Academic Senate in 1846.

== Sources ==
- Lionel von Donop (1882). "Kolbe, Karl Wilhelm". Allgemeine Deutsche Biographie (in German). Vol. 16. Leipzig: Duncker & Humblot. p. 463.
- Charlotte Steinbrucker: "Kolbe, Carl Wilhelm, d. Jüng". In: Hans Vollmer (Ed.): Allgemeines Lexikon der Bildenden Künstler von der Antike bis zur Gegenwart. Vol.21: Knip–Krüger. E. A. Seemann, Leipzig 1927, pp. 226–228.
