= Leonhard Gey =

German painter and professor

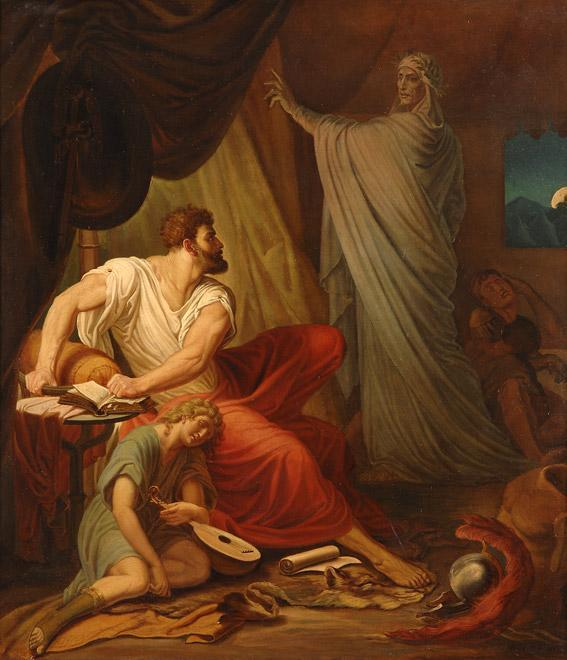
Emperor Henry VII and Dante

Christian Ludwig Leonhard Gey (27 June 1838, Hanover - 21 September 1894, Dresden) was a German history painter and art professor.

== Life and work ==
His father, Traugott Gey, was a Royal Court opera singer. From 1854 to 1856, he was enrolled at the Technical University of Hanover, where he was a student of Conrad Wilhelm Hase. Later, he studied in Düsseldorf, Berlin and Dresden, where he worked in the studios of Julius Schnorr von Carolsfeld.

In 1884 he became a Professor. After 1888, he was the head of the master classes in Drawing from Life at the Dresden Academy of Fine Arts.

In addition to his paintings, he created several murals, in halls at Marienburg Castle (1860–63) and at Albrechtsburg, where he executed a wall mural showing Augustus, Elector of Saxony, and his wife Anne addressing the people of Meissen (1877). Another mural, depicting the announcement of the Peace of Westphalia, at the town hall in Osnabrück (1880), was destroyed during World War II.

In 1928, a street in Dresden's Strehlen district was named after him.
