= Friedrich von Olivier =

German painter

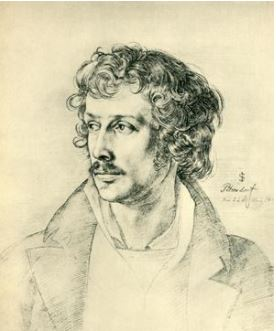
Friedrich von Olivier (1816) by Julius Schnorr von Carolsfeld

Woldemar Friedrich von Olivier (23 April 1791 in Dessau – 5 September 1859 in Dessau) was a German history painter in the Romantic style, often associated with the Nazarene movement.

== Life ==
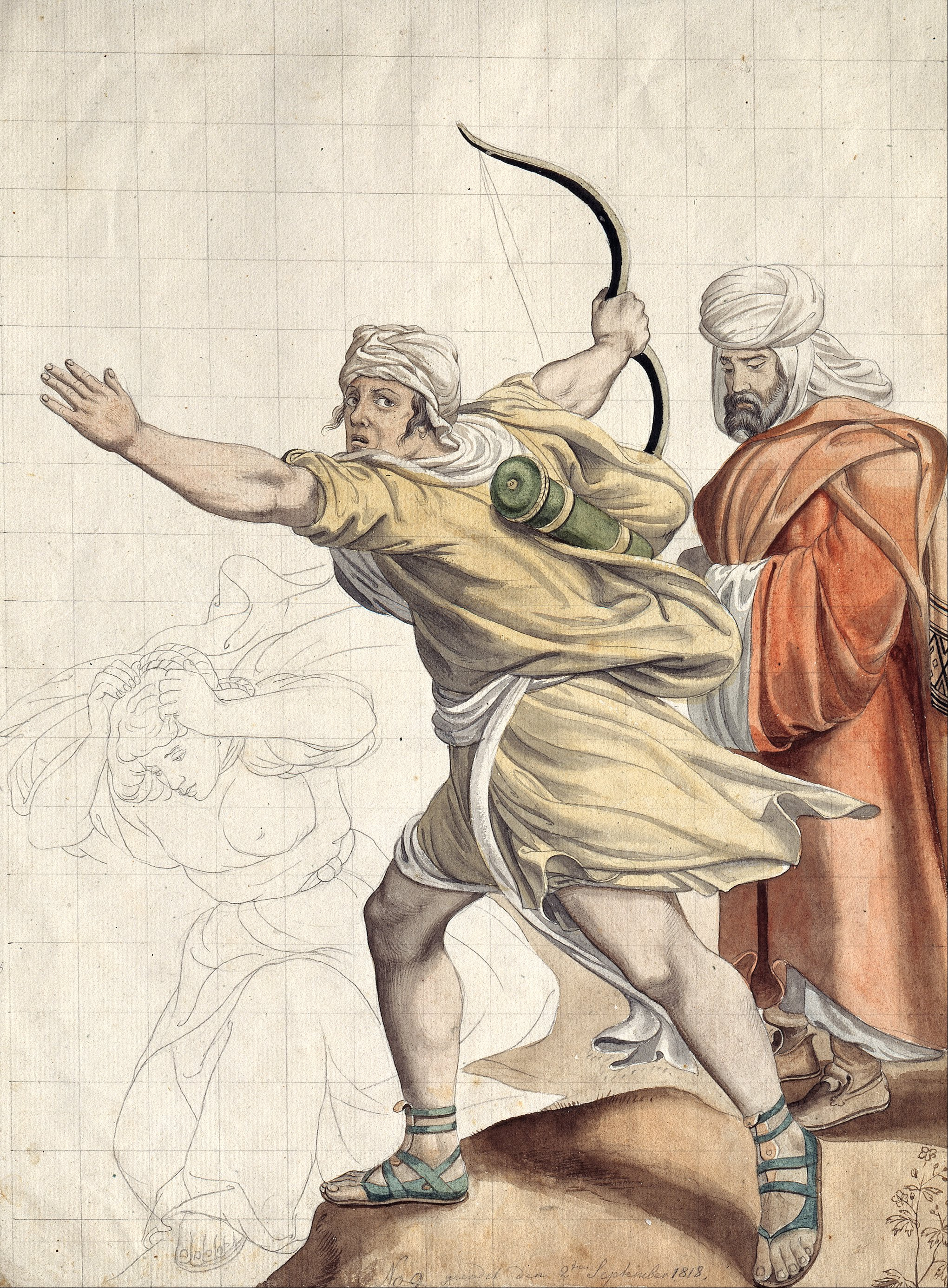
Fleeing Archers (1818)

His father was head of the Dessau Pädagogium and his mother was an opera singer. The painters Ferdinand Olivier and Heinrich Olivier were his brothers. All three received their first art lessons from Carl Wilhelm Kolbe and Christian Haldenwang. Friedrich also received instruction from the Court Sculptor Friedemann Hunold (1773–1840). After his brothers returned from Paris, they accompanied him on a trip through the Harz mountains, then on to Vienna in 1811, where he attended the Academy of Fine Arts Vienna.

Shortly after the Freiheitskriege (Wars of Liberation) began, he joined Theodor Körner and some of his associates, walking from Vienna to Breslau where they joined the Lützow Free Corps. Following campaigns in the Netherlands and France, he was apparently awarded the Order of Saint Anna, third class, but it remains unclear when (or even if) he was granted a title of nobility.

He returned to Vienna in 1814 and travelled throughout Austria. Four years later he, Julius Schnorr von Carolsfeld and other friends took a trip to Italy. In Florence, they made the acquaintance of Baron Carl Friedrich von Rumohr, a notable patron of the arts.

In 1823, he returned to Vienna and, two years later, married his brother Ferdinand's step-daughter. At that time, his painting style underwent a major transformation, prefiguring the style of Hans von Marées. He also spent some time in Munich, assisting Carolsfeld with a large fresco project depicting scenes from the Nibelungenlied at one of King Ludwig's royal residences. After his brother Heinrich's death in 1848, he left his wife and seven children to return to Dessau and take care of his sister. He lived there the rest of his life and created no further works.

Several of his better-known works were lost when a fire destroyed the Glaspalast in Munich on 6 June 1931.

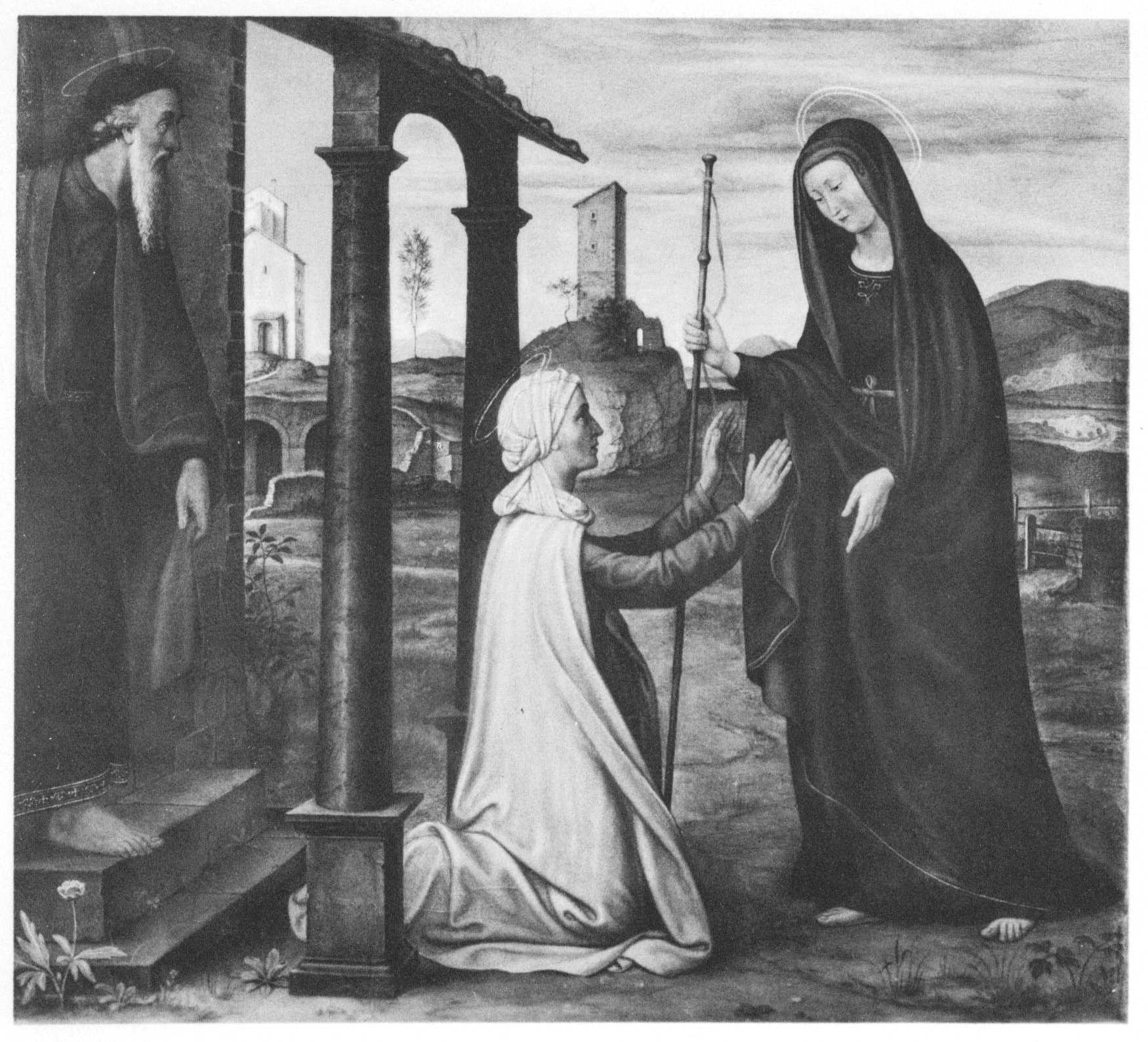
The Visitation of Mary; one of the works lost in the Glaspalast fire.

== Books ==
- Bilder-Bibel in funfzig bildlichen Darstellungen von Olivier (Picture Bible in Fifty Figurative Illustrations by Olivier) with text by Gotthilf Heinrich von Schubert. Published by Friedrich Christoph Perthes (1836, reprinted 1878)
