= Gilles-François de Graimberg de Belleau =

French officer and politician

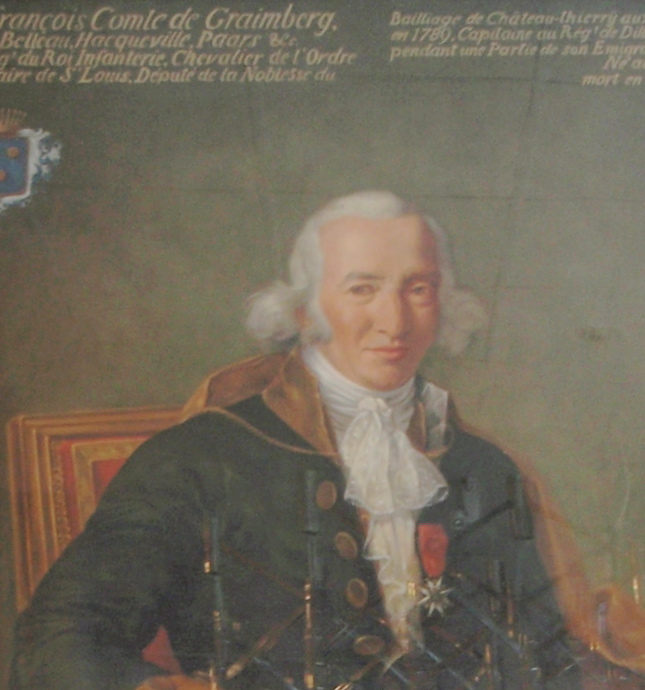
Portrait

Gilles-François, count of Graimberg, lord of Belleau, viscount of Vaustin (28 March 1748 – 4 May 1823) was a French officer and politician. He is also notable as the father of the artist Charles de Graimberg.

== Life ==
He was born at Belleau Castle and became an officer in the régiment du Roi-Infanterie, then a lieutenant to the Marshals of France. On 13 May 1789 he was elected to the Estates General of 1789 as a noble deputy for the bailiwick of Château-Thierry. He sat in his order's minority and on 30 June 1789 wrote a declaration stating:

The undersigned, noble deputy for the bailiwick of Château-Thierry, declares that his powers only permit him to vote on customs in the present assembly of the Estates General; at the same time he declares that he has already written of his assurances to extend his powers to other objects that will be deliberated upon by this august assembly in which he will remain with a merely consultative voice, until he has received assurances of new powers, which will allow him to cooperate in the great work of regenerating the common fatherland, also the most burning desire of the undersigned. He demands the present declaration be acted upon. [Signed] at Versailles, this 30th June 1789. GRAIMBERT DE BELLEAU, noble deputy for the bailiwick of Château-Thierry.

Disapproving of how the Revolution was developing, he resigned as a deputy on 8 July 1791, emigrated and became a captain in the régiment de Dillon, a French Royalist unit fighting alongside the British. He returned to France under the First French Empire and remained in retirement at Belleau until his death.

== Sources ==
- "Gilles-François de Graimberg de Belleau", in Adolphe Robert and Gaston Cougny, Dictionnaire des parlementaires français (1789-1891), Bourloton, Paris, 1889 Edition details Wikisource
