= Heinrich Olivier =

German painter, illustrator and graphic artist

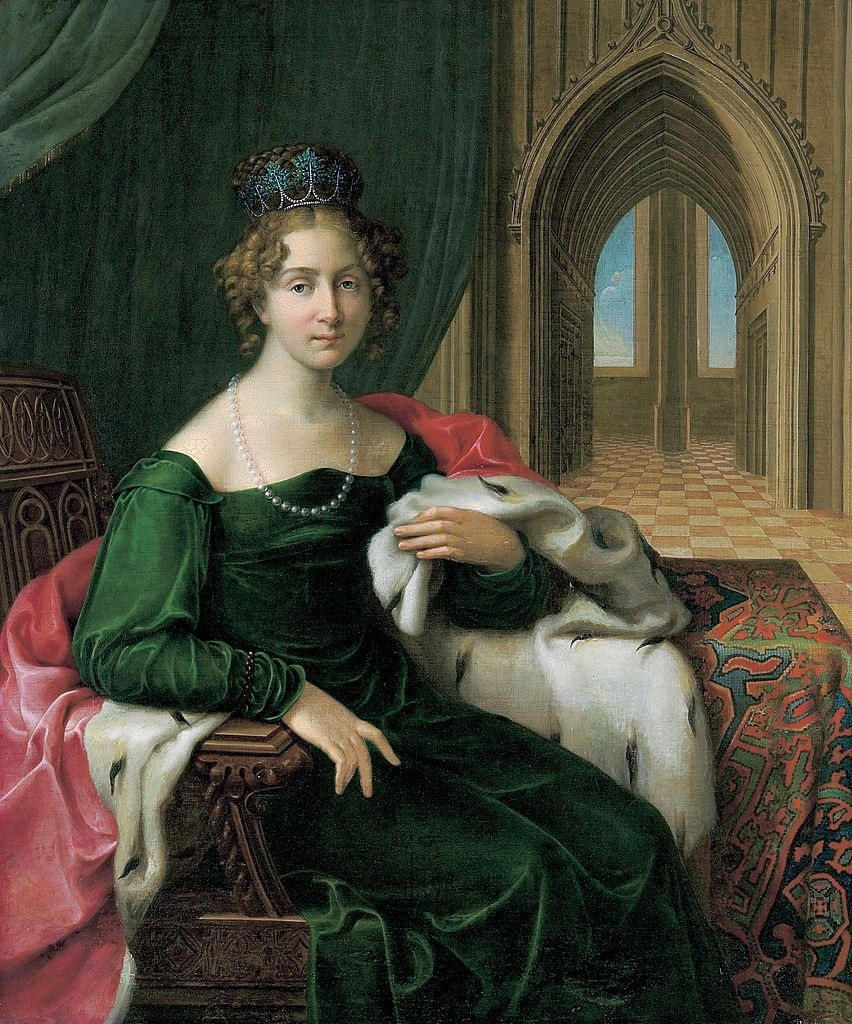
Princess Frederica of Prussia

Heinrich Olivier (2 July 1783, Dessau - 3 March 1848, Berlin) was a German painter, illustrator and graphic artist.

== Early life ==
He was born to the pedagogue, Ludwig Heinrich Ferdinand Olivier and his wife, the opera singer, Louise Neidhart. His brothers, Ferdinand and Friedrich also became painters.

Like his brothers, he took his first art lessons from 1801 to 1802, with Carl Wilhelm Kolbe and Christian Haldenwang. From 1801, he also studied philology at the University of Leipzig. He likely took classes at the Akademie der Künste there as well, based on the entries at the Akademie's exhibition in 1803. The following year, he went with Ferdinand to Dresden then, in 1807, to Paris. There, he made copies of the Old Masters at the Louvre.

== Career ==
Except for a brief return to Paris in 1810, he worked in Dessau until 1813. That year, he joined the Russian-German Legion as an officer. When the campaign came to an end, he returned to Vienna. During this time, he earned his living creating illustrations for popular magazines. He was also rumored to be "close to" the writer, Dorothea von Schlegel, eldest daughter of the philosopher, Moses Mendelssohn, who was almost twenty years his senior.

His financial situation forced a return to Dessau, where he became increasingly less able to support himself with his art. After a time, he moved to Berlin, where he found a position as a drawing and language teacher. He died there at the age of sixty-five.

== Sources ==
- Constantin von Wurzbach: "O’Livier, Künstlerfamilie." In: Biographisches Lexikon des Kaiserthums Oesterreich (Biographical Lexicon of the Empire of Austria). Part 21 Kaiserlich-königliche Hof- und Staatsdruckerei, Vienna 1870, p. 57 f. (digitalised).
- Franz Schnorr von Carolsfeld (1887). "Olivier, Ferdinand von" . Allgemeine Deutsche Biographie (in German). Vol. 24. Leipzig: Duncker & Humblot. pp. 308–311. (Familienartikel)
- Lisa Hackmann, Sylva van der Heyden: "Olivier, Heinrich", in: Bénédicte Savoy, France Nerlich (Eds.): Pariser Lehrjahre. Ein Lexikon zur Ausbildung deutscher Maler in der französischen Hauptstadt. Vol.1: 1793-1843, de Gruyter, Berlin/Boston 2013, ISBN 978-3-11-029057-8, pp. 217–218.
