= Carl Wilhelm Kolbe the Elder =

German etcher, graphic artist and author

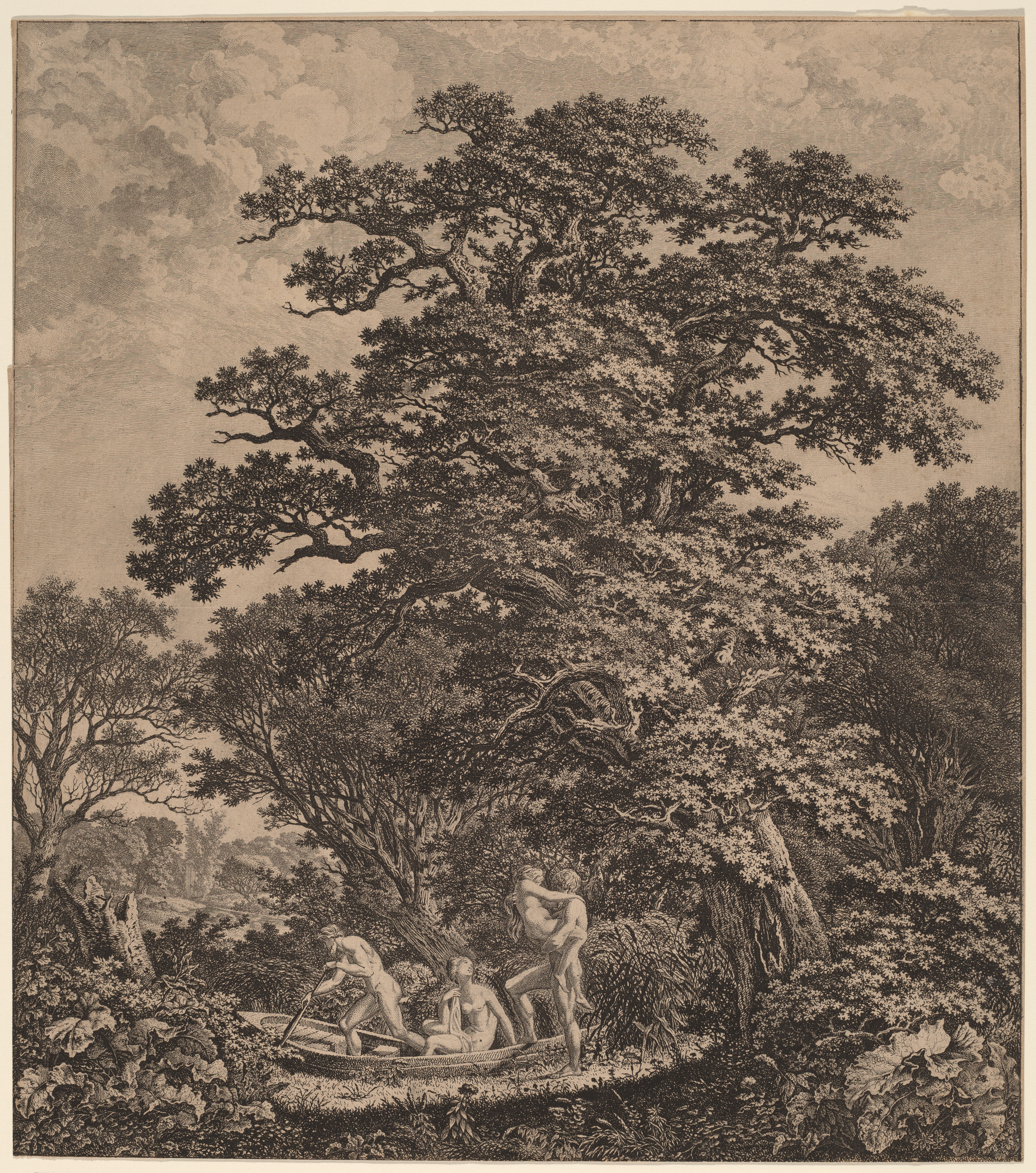
Landscape with Nudes Boarding a Boat

Carl Wilhelm Kolbe (20 November 1757/59, Berlin - 13 January 1835, Dessau) was a German etcher, graphic artist and author. He was generally referred to as The Elder to distinguish him from his nephew, a painter who was also named Carl Wilhelm Kolbe.

== Biography ==
His father, Christian Wilhelm Kolbe, made wallpaper and did goldwork. He attended a French grammar school. After graduating, and a brief time in the employ of Count Friedrich Wilhelm von der Schulenburg-Kehnert, he went to Dessau in 1780 to teach French at the Philanthropinum. It was there that he began to write. He returned to Berlin in 1782 and, under the influence of a distant relative, Daniel Chodowiecki, became interested in painting and drawing. After a failed attempt at studying law in Halle, he reassumed his teaching position in Dessau.

In 1793, when the Philanthropinum closed, he decided on a career in art and went back to Berlin, where he studied with Chodowiecki, Asmus Carstens and Johann Wilhelm Meil. In 1795, he was named a full member of the Prussian Academy of Arts. That same year, he was called by Leopold III, Duke of Anhalt-Dessau, to establish a new art academy in Dessau, but eh project never materialized. Instead, he once again taught French there. During this time, his first etching portfolios appeared; mostly comprising landscapes. In 1798, he was appointed the court copper engraver and was engaged as a drawing teacher for Prince Leopold. From 1805 to 1808, with the Prince's permission, he was a guest of the artist Salomon Gessner, in Zürich, where he produced etchings based on Gessner's paintings.

In addition to his etchings, he produced several books on the subject of "Deutscher Sprachpurismus" (linguistic purity); notably Über den Wortreichthum der deutschen und französischen Sprache und beider Anlage zur Poesie ("About the richness of words of the German and French languages and both of their disposition to poetry", in two volumes, 1809 and 1820). In appreciation of his work, he was awarded an honorary Doctorate of Philosophy by the University of Halle in 1810.

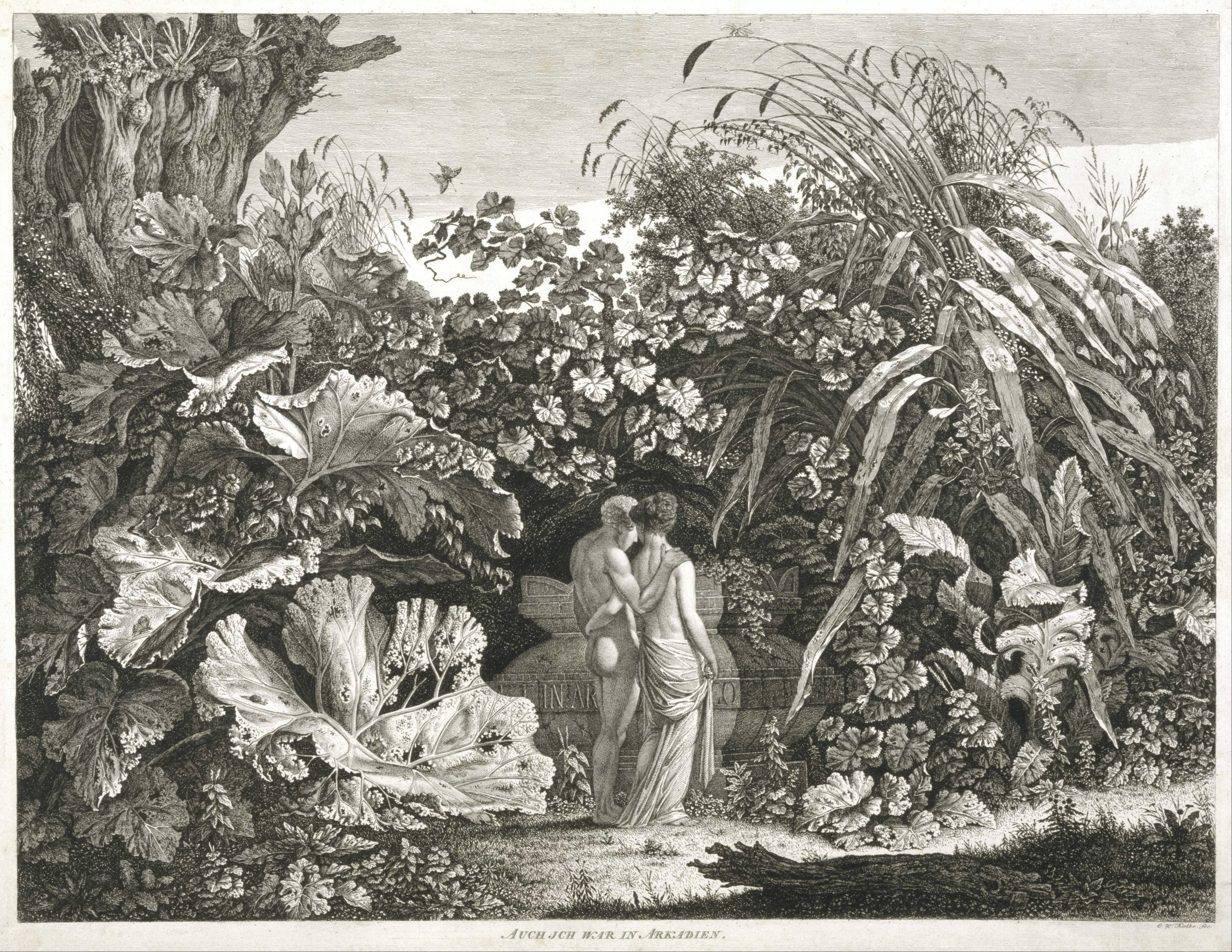
"I Too Was in Arcadia"

He was unable to follow up on the success of his first landscape portfolios and had difficulty finding publishers for his newer works. He published his autobiography in 1825, retired from teaching in 1829 and died six years later, at the age of 77.
