= Christian Haldenwang =

German copperplate engraver

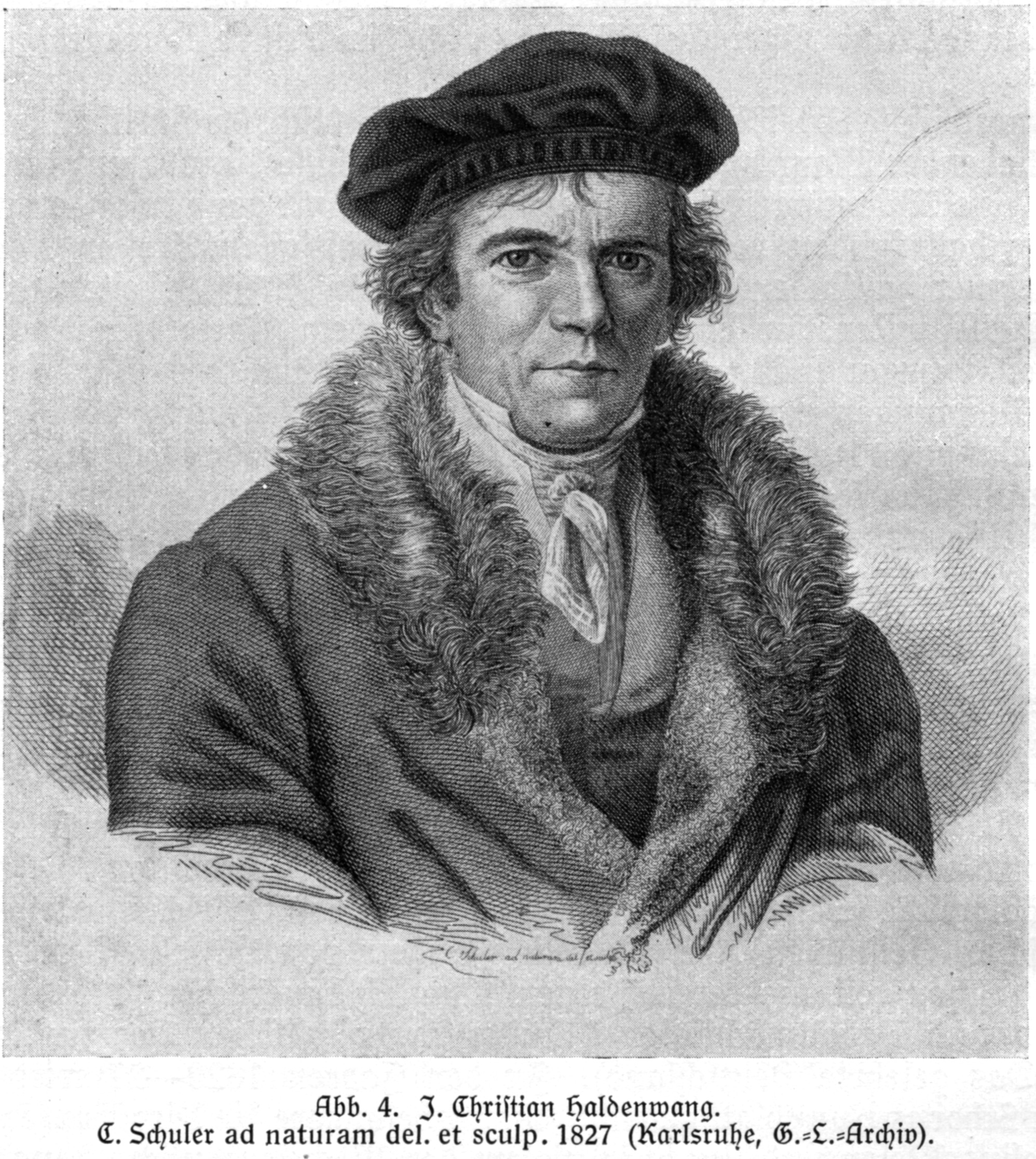
Christian Haldenwang

Christian Haldenwang (14 May 1770 - 27 June 1831) was a German copperplate engraver.

== Life ==
Born in Durlach in 1770, he visited Christian von Mechel's studio in Basel. In 1796 he was summoned by the Chalkographische Gesellschaft zu Dessau (Copperplate Society of Dessau). In 1804 he moved to Karlsruhe as court-engraver to what was soon to become the Grand Duchy of Baden. He specialised in landscapes, producing copies of Claude Lorrain's The Four Seasons (now in the Hermitage Museum), Elsheimer's The Flight into Egypt, Poussin's Landscape with Diogenes and Ruisdael's The Waterfall. He also produced copies of other landscapes by Claude and Ruisdael for the Musée Napoléon. He died in 1831 in Rippoldsau.

== Sources ==
- (in German) Christian Haldenwang. In: Ulrich Thieme, Felix Becker (editors): Allgemeines Lexikon der Bildenden Künstler von der Antike bis zur Gegenwart. Band 15, E. A. Seemann, Leipzig 1922, S. 498.
- Alfred Woltmann (1879). "Haldenwang, Christian". Allgemeine Deutsche Biographie (in German). Vol. 10. Leipzig: Duncker & Humblot. pp. 406–407.
- Hasso von Haldenwang: Christian Haldenwang, Kupferstecher (1770–1831). Kunstgeschichtliches Inst., Frankfurt am Main 1997, ISBN 3-923813-13-9
- Literature by and about Christian Haldenwang in the German National Library catalogue
