= Frederick V of the Palatinate =

Elector Palatine and King of Bohemia (1596–1632)

Frederick V
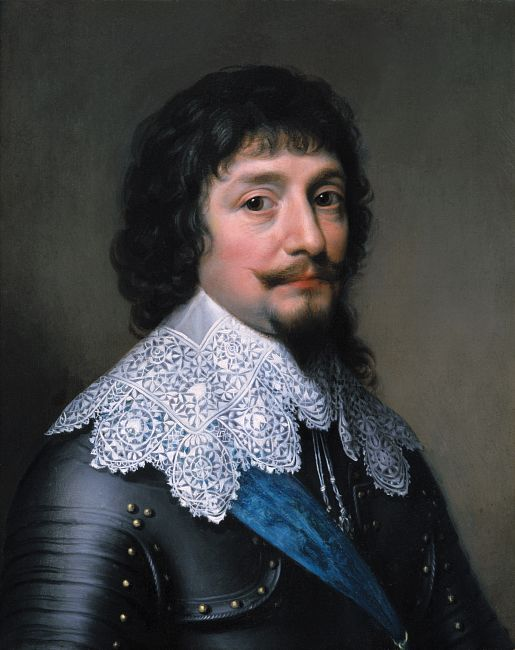
- Portrait by Michiel Jansz. van Mierevelt, c. 1630

Elector Palatine
- Reign: 19 September 1610 – 23 February 1623
- Predecessor: Frederick IV
- Successor: Maximilian I

King of Bohemia (as Frederick I) (Note: Disputed with Ferdinand II)
- Reign: 26 August 1619 – 8 November 1620
- Coronation: 4 November 1619; St Vitus Cathedral
- Predecessor: Ferdinand II
- Successor: Ferdinand II
- Born: 26 August 1596; Deinschwang, Palatinate, Holy Roman Empire
- Died: 29 November 1632 (aged 36); Mainz, Holy Roman Empire
- Spouse: Elizabeth Stuart (m. 1613)
- Issue more...: See: Henry Frederick, Electoral Prince of the Palatinate Charles I Louis, Elector Palatine Elisabeth, Princess-Abbess of Herford Prince Rupert, Duke of Cumberland Prince Maurice Louise Hollandine, Abbess of Maubuisson Prince Louis Prince Edward, Count Palatine of Simmern Princess Henriette Marie Prince Philip Frederick Princess Charlotte Sophia, Electress of Hanover Prince Gustavus Adolphus
- House: Palatine Simmern
- Father: Frederick IV
- Mother: Princess Louise Juliana of Orange-Nassau
- Religion: Calvinist

Frederick's coat of arms

Frederick V (German: Friedrich V.; 26 August 1596 – 29 November 1632) was the Elector Palatine of the Rhine in the Holy Roman Empire from 1610 to 1623, and reigned as Frederick I, King of Bohemia from 1619 to 1620. He was forced to abdicate both roles, and the brevity of his reign in Bohemia earned him the derisive sobriquet "the Winter King" (Czech: Zimní král; German: Winterkönig).

Frederick was born in Deinschwang, Palatinate at the hunting lodge (Jagdschloss), Germany. He was the son of Frederick IV and of Louise Juliana of Orange-Nassau, the daughter of William the Silent and Charlotte de Bourbon-Montpensier. An intellectual, a mystic, and a Calvinist, he succeeded his father as Prince-Elector of the Rhenish Palatinate in 1610, and at the age of 17 was married to the Protestant princess Elizabeth Stuart.

In 1618, the largely Protestant Czech nobility of Bohemia rebelled against their Catholic king, Ferdinand II, beginning a conflict that would become the Thirty Years' War. Frederick was asked to assume the crown of Bohemia. He accepted the offer and was crowned on 4 November 1619, as Frederick I (Czech: Fridrich Falcký, lit. 'Frederick of the Palatinate'). The estates chose Frederick because he was the leader of the Protestant Union, a military alliance founded by his father, and hoped for the support of Frederick's father-in-law, James VI of Scotland and I of England. However, James opposed his son-in-law's takeover of Bohemia from the Habsburgs and Frederick's allies in the Protestant Union failed to support him militarily by signing the Treaty of Ulm. His brief reign as king of Bohemia ended with his defeat at the Battle of White Mountain on 8 November 1620 – a year and four days after his coronation.

After the battle, the Imperial forces invaded Frederick's Palatine lands, forcing him to flee to his uncle Prince Maurice, Stadtholder of the Dutch Republic in 1622. An Imperial edict formally deprived him of the Palatinate in 1623. He lived the rest of his life in exile with his wife and family, mostly at The Hague, and died in Mainz in 1632 after an unsuccessful attempt to convince Gustavus Adolphus of Sweden to restore him as ruler of the Palatinate.

His eldest surviving son, Charles I Louis, was restored to the electorate in 1648 under the Peace of Westphalia. Another son was Prince Rupert of the Rhine, one of the most colourful figures of his time. Frederick's daughter Princess Sophia was eventually named heiress presumptive to the British throne, and is the founder of the Hanoverian line of kings.

== Youth, 1596–1610 ==
Map showing the Electoral Palatinate in the Holy Roman Empire. As son and heir of Frederick IV, Elector Palatine (1574–1610), Frederick was the hereditary ruler of the Palatinate.

Frederick was born on 26 August 1596 at the Jagdschloss, 'hunting lodge' in Deinschwang, Electoral Palatinate. His father, Frederick IV, was the ruler of the Electoral Palatinate; his mother was Louise Juliana of Nassau, the daughter of William I of Orange and Charlotte de Bourbon-Monpensier. Frederick was related to almost all of the ruling families of the Holy Roman Empire and a number of diplomats and dignitaries attended his baptism at Amberg on 6 October 1596. The Palatine Simmerns, the elder branch of the House of Wittelsbach, were noted for their attachment to Calvinism; this was in marked contrast to the other cadet branch of Wittelsbachs, headed by Duke Maximilian of Bavaria, which was deeply devoted to the Roman Catholic Church.

The capital of the Palatinate, Heidelberg, was suffering from an outbreak of bubonic plague at this time, so Frederick spent his first two years in the Upper Palatinate before being brought to Heidelberg in 1598. In 1604, at his mother's urging, he was sent to Sedan to live in the court of his uncle Henri de La Tour d'Auvergne, Duke of Bouillon. During his time at Sedan, Frederick was a frequent visitor to the court of Henry IV of France. His tutor was Calvinist theologian Daniel Tilenus, a professor of theology at the Academy of Sedan. During the Eighty Years' War and the French Wars of Religion, Tilenus called for the unity of Protestant princes, and taught that it was their Christian duty to intervene if their brethren were being harassed. These views are likely to have shaped Frederick's future policies.

== Controversy over guardianship, 1610–1614 ==
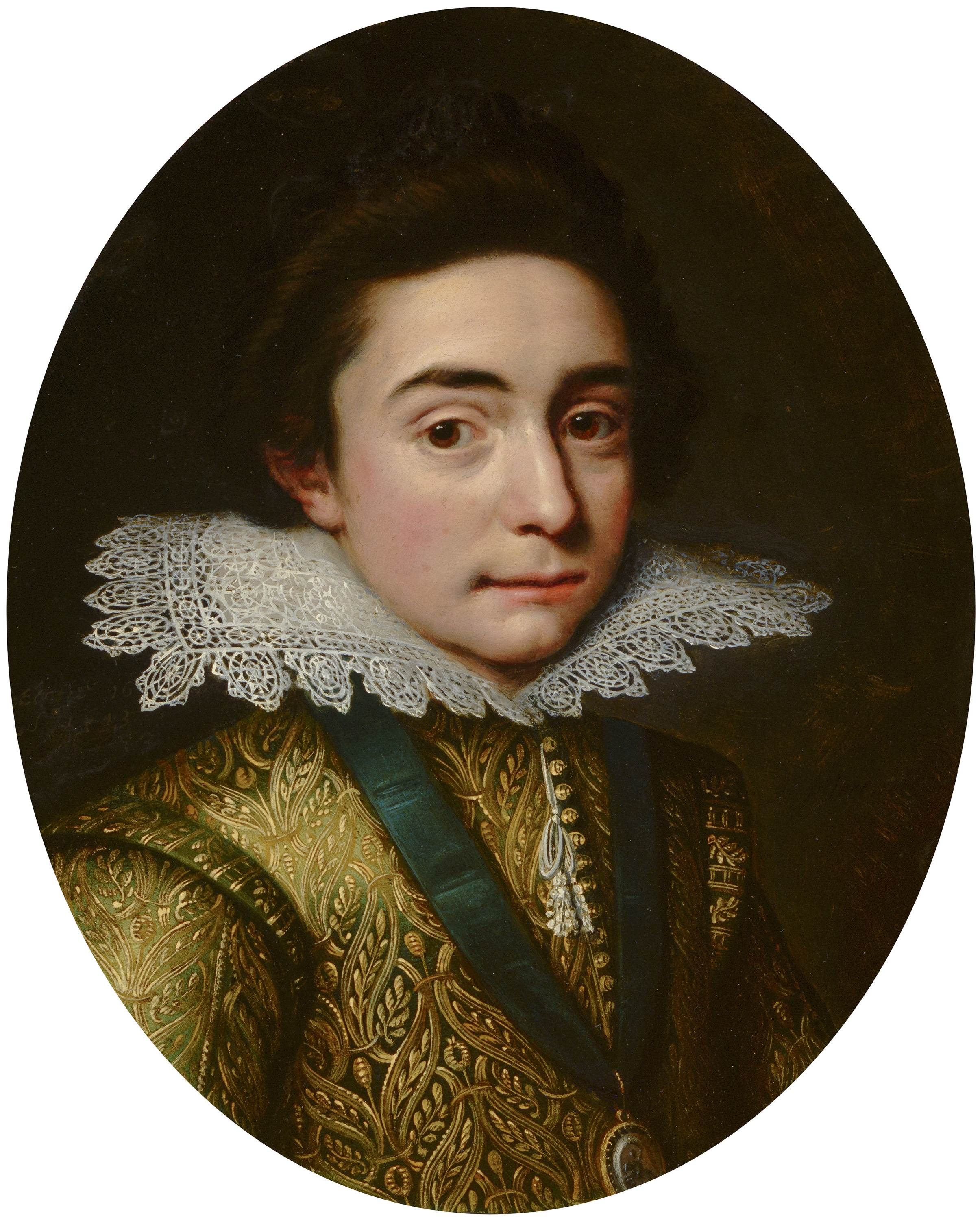
Portrait of Frederick by Michiel Jansz. van Mierevelt, 1613

On 19 September 1610, Frederick's father, Frederick IV, died from "extravagant living"; his son being 14 years old at the time. Under the terms of the Golden Bull of 1356, Frederick's closest male relative would serve as his guardian and as regent of the Palatinate until Frederick reached the age of majority. However, his nearest male relative, Wolfgang William, Count Palatine of Neuburg, was a Catholic, so, shortly before his death, Frederick IV had named another Wittelsbach, John II, Count Palatine of Zweibrücken, as his son's guardian. Frederick V welcomed John to Heidelberg, whereas Wolfgang William was denied entry. This led to a heated dispute among the princes of the Holy Roman Empire.

In 1613, Matthias, Holy Roman Emperor intervened in the dispute, with the result being that Frederick V was able to begin his personal rule in the Palatinate even though he was still underage. The dispute ended in 1614, when Frederick attained his eighteenth birthday. However, much bad blood among the houses was caused by this dispute.

== Marriage to Elizabeth Stuart ==
Frederick IV's marriage policy had been designed to solidify the Palatinate's position within the Reformed camp in Europe. Two of Frederick V's sisters were married to leading Protestant princes: his sister Luise Juliane to his one-time guardian John II, Count Palatine of Zweibrücken, and his sister Elizabeth Charlotte to George William, Elector of Brandenburg. Frederick IV had hoped that his daughter Katharina would marry the future Gustavus Adolphus of Sweden, although this never came to pass.

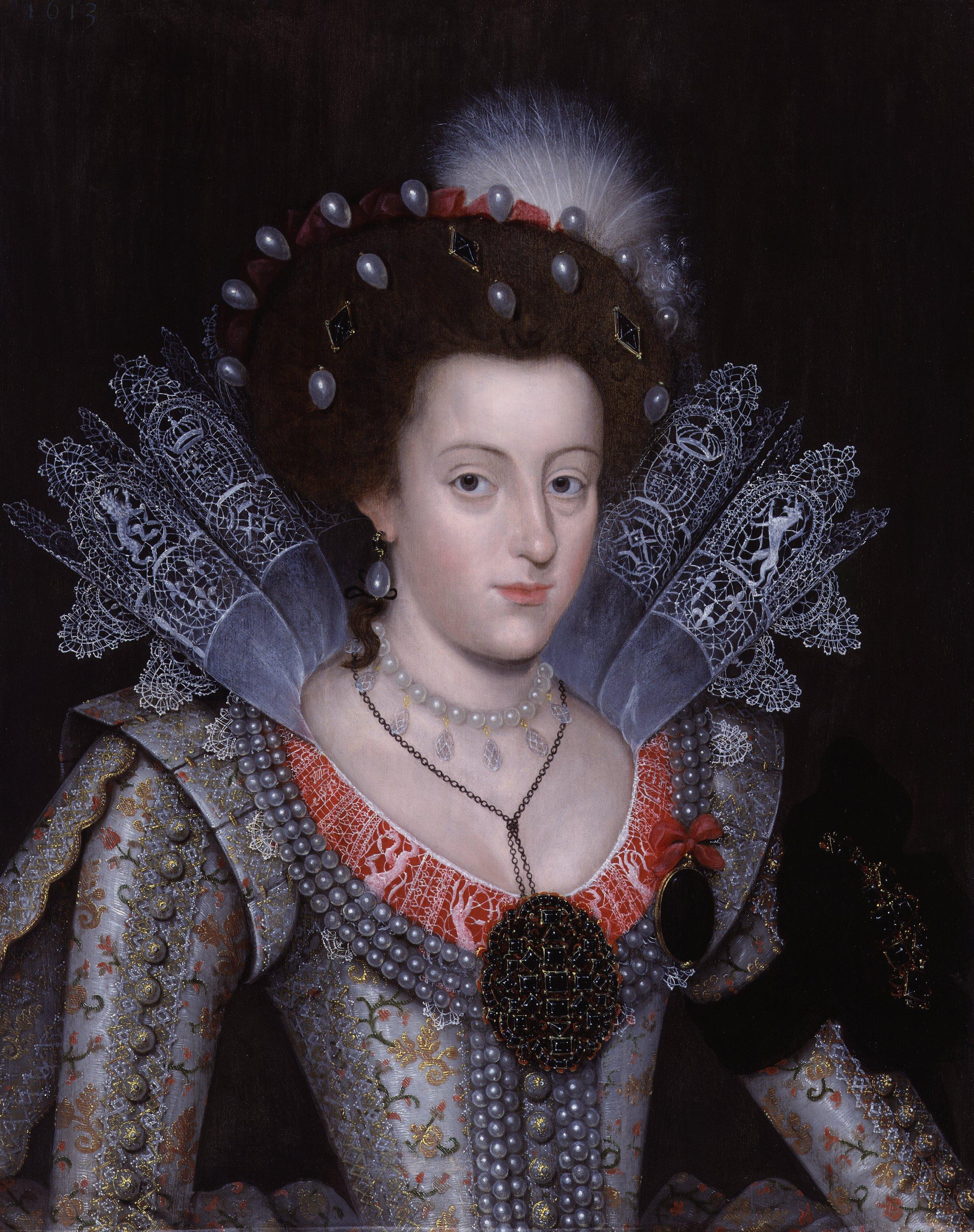
Elizabeth Stuart in 1613, later Queen of Bohemia, called the Winter Queen

In keeping with his father's policy, Frederick V sought a marriage to Elizabeth Stuart, daughter of James VI of Scotland and I of England. James had initially considered marrying Elizabeth to Louis XIII of France, but these plans were rejected by his advisors. Frederick's advisors in the Palatinate were worried that if Elizabeth were married to a Catholic prince, this would upset the confessional balance of Europe, and they were thus resolved that she should marry Frederick V. Hans Meinhard von Schönberg, who had served as Frederick V's Hofmeister since his return to Heidelberg, was sent to London to court the princess in spring 1612. After intense negotiations, a marriage contract was signed on 26 May 1612, over the objection of her mother, Queen Anne.

Frederick travelled to London to collect his bride, landing on English soil on 16 October 1612. Frederick and Elizabeth, who had previously corresponded in French, now met each other for the first time, and got on well together. They were formally engaged in January 1613 and married on 14 February 1613 at the royal chapel at the Palace of Whitehall. The event was celebrated in John Donne's poetic masterpiece Epithalamion, or Mariage Song on the Lady Elizabeth, and Count Palatine being married on St. Valentines Day. Shortly before the ceremony, Frederick was inducted into the Order of the Garter and he wore the Order's chain during the wedding ceremony. Elaborate celebrations, organised by Francis Bacon, followed the ceremony; these included a performance of The Masque of the Inner Temple and Gray's Inn by Francis Beaumont and The Memorable Masque of the Middle Temple and Lincoln's Inn by George Chapman.

On their return trip to Heidelberg, Frederick and Elizabeth travelled to The Hague to visit Maurice of Nassau, Prince of Orange before leaving for Germany on 5 May 1613. The couple entered Heidelberg on 12 June 1613, amidst widespread celebration. Elizabeth was popular with Frederick's subjects, and this popularity grew when, on 1 January 1614, she gave birth to a son, Frederick Henry. As part of the marriage negotiations, Frederick had agreed to expand Heidelberg Castle. These renovations were completed in 1615 and the "Elizabeth Entrance" to Heidelberg Castle was dedicated.

== Electoral reign before the Thirty Years' War, 1614–1618 ==
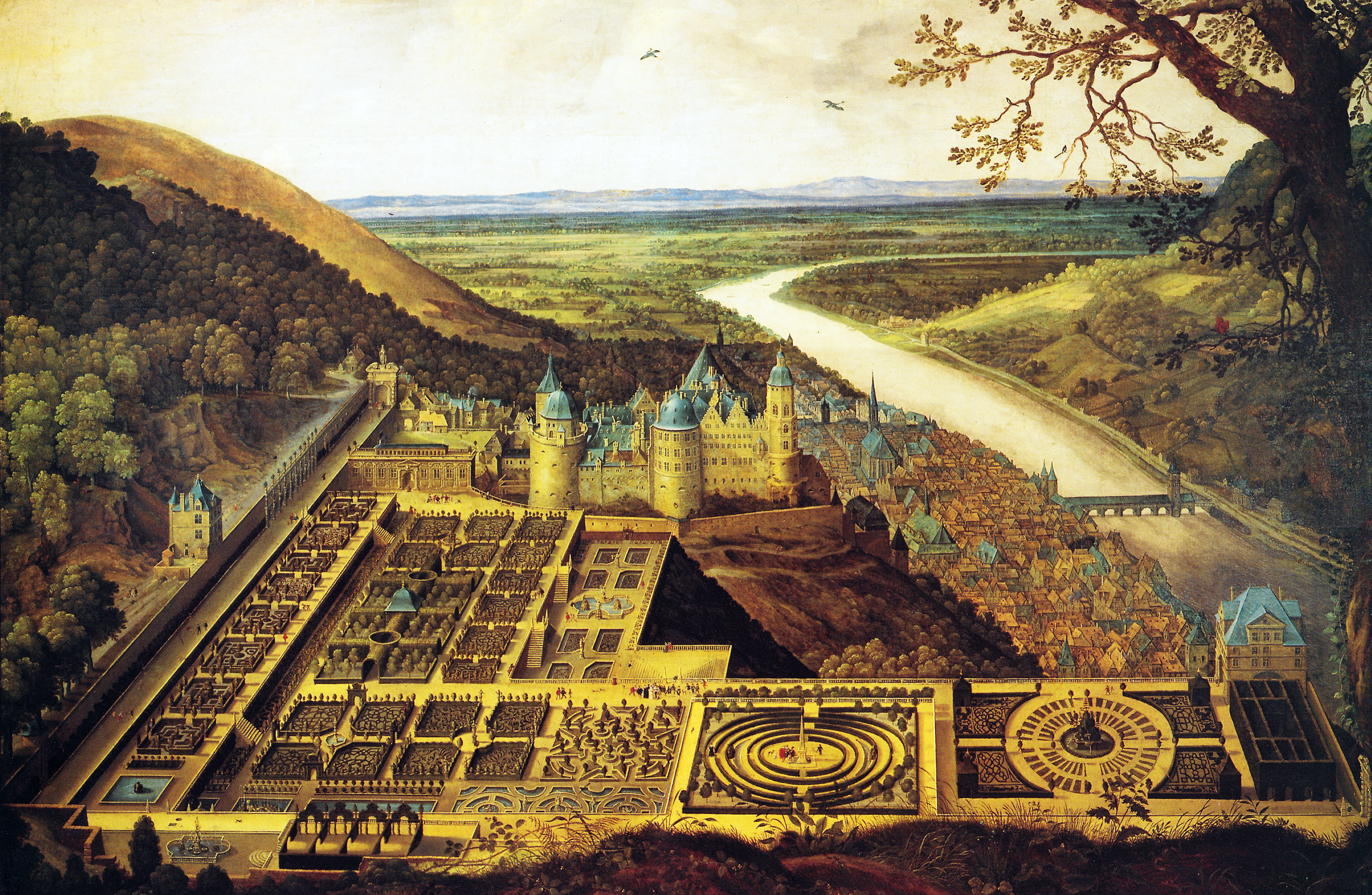
Heidelberg Castle and the Hortus Palatinus commissioned by Frederick, and designed by English architect Inigo Jones (1573–1652) and French engineer Salomon de Caus (1576–1626), painting by Jacques Fouquier

One of Frederick's first acts upon taking the reins of government was attendance at a meeting of the Protestant Union, during which he was struck by fever and nearly died. Subsequently contemporaries described him as changed, melancholy and possibly depressed. As such, Frederick transferred much responsibility to his chancellor, Christian I, Prince of Anhalt-Bernburg.

Frederick undertook a large building campaign, designed to glorify his regime. In addition to the renovations to Heidelberg Castle mentioned above, he commissioned a courtyard garden, the Hortus Palatinus, designed by English gardener Inigo Jones and French engineer Salomon de Caus. Frederick was depicted therein as Apollo and as Hercules.

Politically, Frederick positioned himself as a leader of the Protestant princes in the Holy Roman Empire, and as a defender of the liberty of the German nobles against the Catholic Matthias, Holy Roman Emperor. Since the Peace of Augsburg, the Empire had been delicately balanced between Catholic, Lutheran, and Calvinist principalities (although Calvinism was not recognised in the Peace of Augsburg). The conflicts between princes of these three faiths developed into a deep struggle over the Empire's constitution. Furthermore, the Twelve Years' Truce, a hiatus in the Eighty Years' War, was set to expire in 1621, and was likely to lead to renewed fighting between the Dutch Republic and the Spanish Empire.

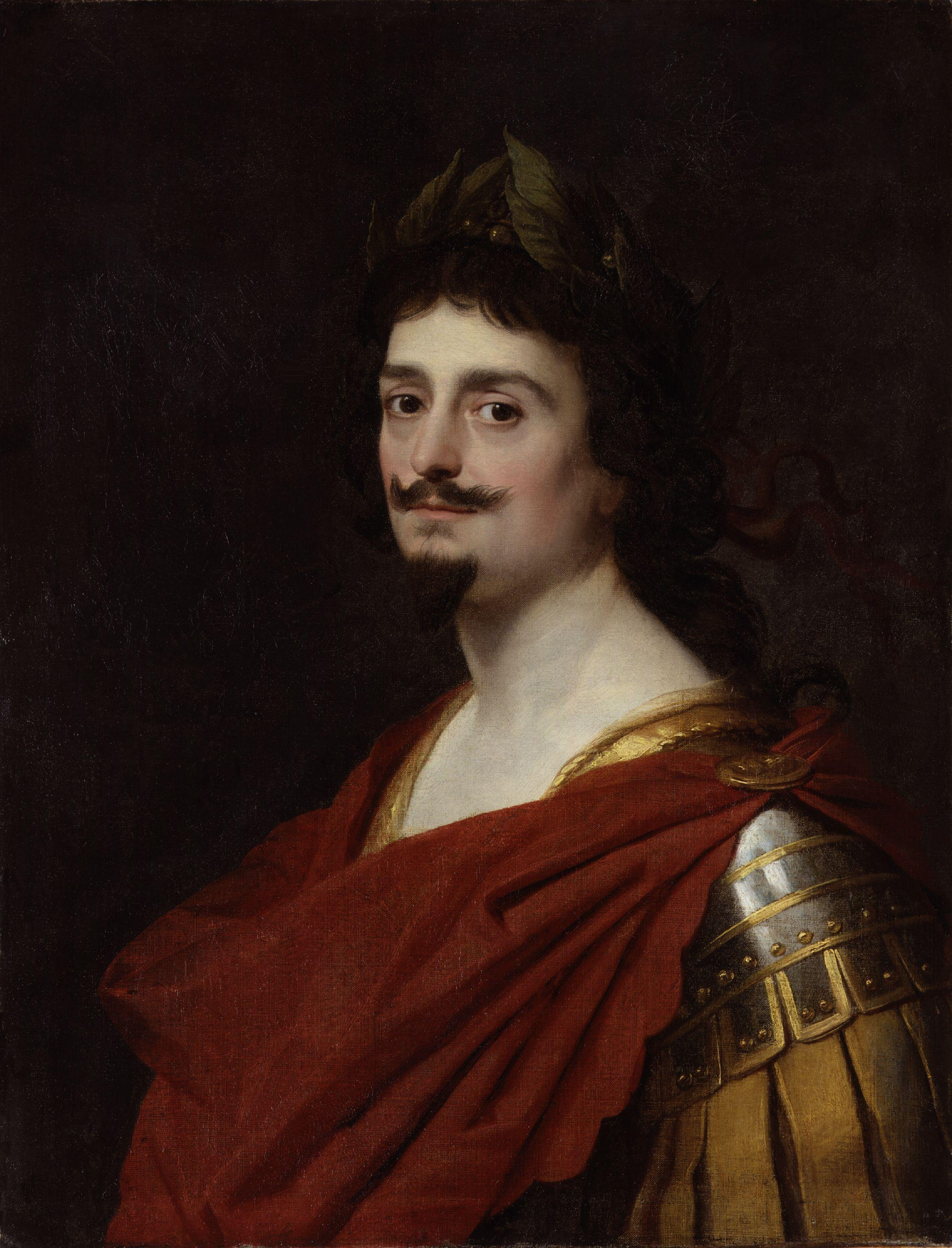
Frederick in Roman garb

With its central location in Germany, the Palatinate was vulnerable to incursions of imperial troops from the Habsburg hereditary lands. Unlike many principalities of the Holy Roman Empire, the Electoral Palatinate was not a solid dominion, but instead consisted of two unconnected provinces surrounded by foreign lands. The Lower Palatinate centred on Heidelberg, while the Upper Palatinate centred on Amberg. The Lower Palatinate's economy was dominated by agriculture, while the Upper Palatinate was a mining region with one of the most successful economies in Europe.

== King of Bohemia, 1619–20 ==
=== Background and plans ===
The Kingdom of Bohemia was an elective monarchy, and despite being a kingdom, was a part of the Holy Roman Empire. Since 1526, the kings of Bohemia had all been members of the House of Habsburg; since 1555, these kings had also been emperors. In the early seventeenth century, however, Bohemia faced a political crisis. The Estates of the realm of Bohemia became worried that the Habsburgs were planning to transform Bohemia into an absolute monarchy. A large number of Bohemian nobles were Protestant and feared that a Catholic emperor would attempt to impose Catholicism on Bohemia. Thus, a substantial opposition movement developed to the rule of Emperor Rudolf II. Rudolf had waged the Long War against the Ottoman Empire from 1593 to 1606. Dissatisfied with the outcome, Rudolf sought to launch a new war against the Ottomans. To gain Bohemian support, Rudolf agreed to guarantee Bohemia's religious liberty, issuing his so-called Letter of Majesty in 1609. Still, the Bohemian nobles remained suspicious of Rudolf and in contact with the Protestant Union.

The Bohemian Estates elected the Habsburg Matthias as Rudolf's heir, and Matthias became king of Bohemia in 1611 and emperor in 1612. Yet in the latter year there was discussion within the Protestant Union about fielding a Protestant candidate to supplant Matthias as king of Bohemia, and Frederick's name was discussed in this regard. Strategists in the Palatinate believed that if Frederick became king, this would lead John George I, Elector of Saxony, to break his alliance with the Habsburgs and come fully to the Protestant cause. This assumption proved unfounded.

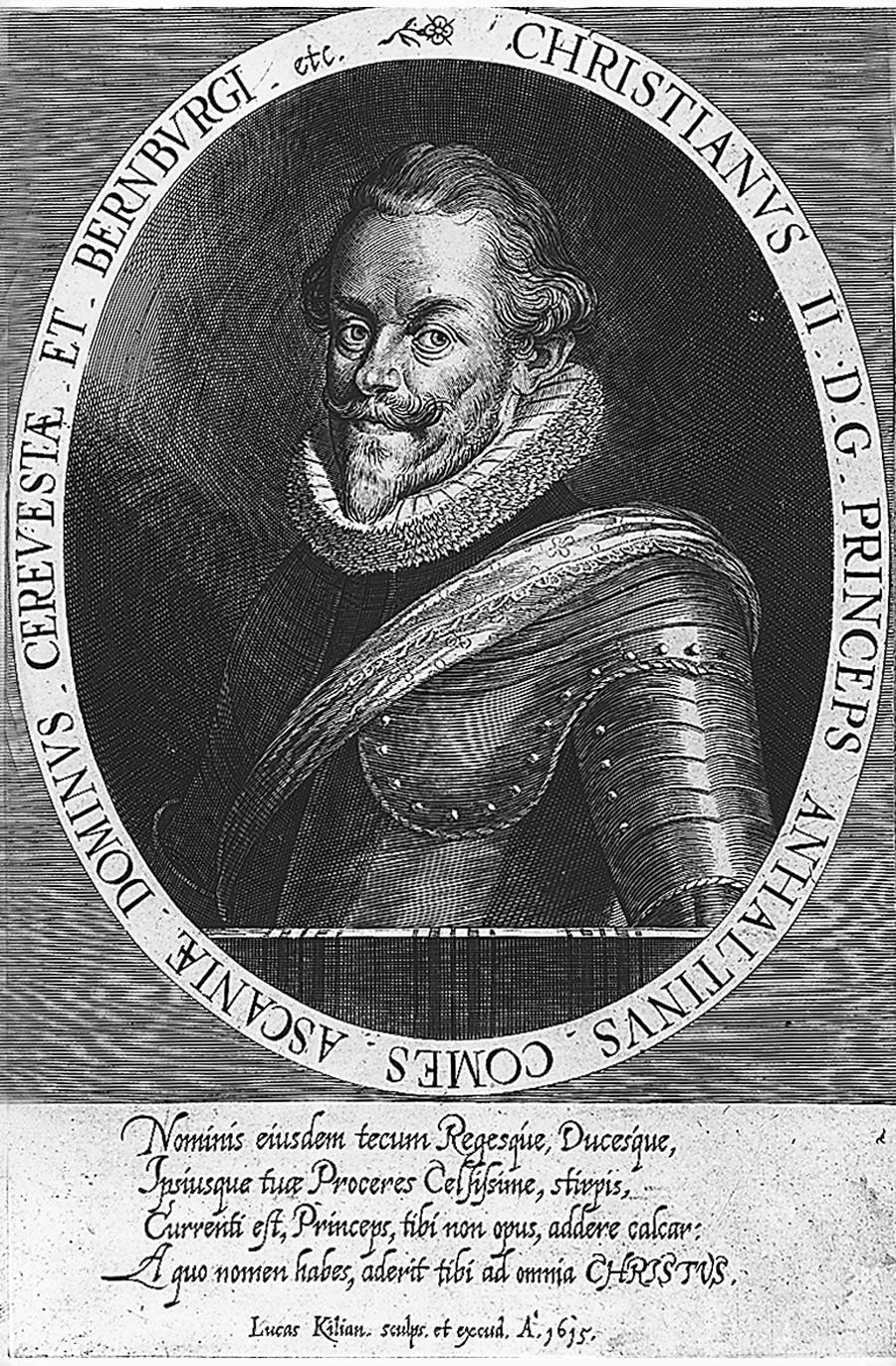
Frederick's chancellor Christian I, Prince of Anhalt-Bernburg (1568–1630)

Meanwhile, the sectarian conflicts in Bohemia continued. In 1617, Matthias prevailed on the Bohemian Estates to elect the Habsburg Ferdinand, Duke of Styria, as heir to the throne of Bohemia. Ferdinand was an intensely loyal Catholic, and many Protestant noblemen believed that Ferdinand intended to withdraw the protections of Rudolf II's Letter of Majesty. These suspicions were further aroused when Imperial officials ordered Protestants to stop erecting Protestant churches on the "Stifts", lands held by ecclesiastical lords who were not subject to the Bohemian Estates. The Protestants claimed the status of these lands fell under the term "royal land", and thus were subject to Bohemia's authority by the Letter of Majesty – a very disputed legal interpretation which the Habsburg government rejected. On 23 May 1618, an assembly of Protestant noblemen, led by Count Jindřich Matyáš Thurn, stormed Prague Castle, and seized two Imperial governors, Vilem Slavata of Chlum and Jaroslav Borzita of Martinice. The rebels charged them with violating the Letter of Majesty, found them guilty, and threw them and their scribe Philip Fabricius out of the windows of the Bohemian Chancellery. This event – known as the Second Defenestration of Prague – marked the beginning of the Bohemian Revolt, and with it, the beginning of the Thirty Years' War.

In these circumstances Christian I, Prince of Anhalt-Bernburg, Frederick V's governor of the Upper Palatinate, moved to intervene in Bohemia. He did not initially propose nominating Frederick as king because the young elector was still seen as politically inexperienced, and was a Calvinist, while there were virtually no Calvinists in Bohemia. At any rate, Frederick was not initially eager to defy the Emperor, who had praised Frederick's loyalty. Frederick did not publicly break with the Emperor, but in a letter to his father-in-law, James I of England, he placed the blame for the Bohemian vote on the Jesuits and the Spanish party at the Habsburg court. This was a questionable evasion of the role played by Frederick's own agents.

The first mention in Prague of Frederick's name as a possible candidate as king of Bohemia came in November 1618. It is not known if Frederick's agents played a role in talking up his possible candidacy. Palatine diplomat Christoph von Dohna approached James I of England with the possibility of Frederick becoming king, but James reacted negatively to this idea. The princes of the Protestant Union similarly rejected the idea, fearing it might lead to religious war and the Elector of Saxony was staunchly opposed.

Behind the scenes, Frederick authorised sending a force under Count Ernst von Mansfeld to support the Bohemian rebels. In August 1618, forces under Mansfeld entered Bohemia and led the Siege of Pilsen, which saw Pilsen fall to rebel forces on 21 November 1618, leaving the entire kingdom in Protestant hands.

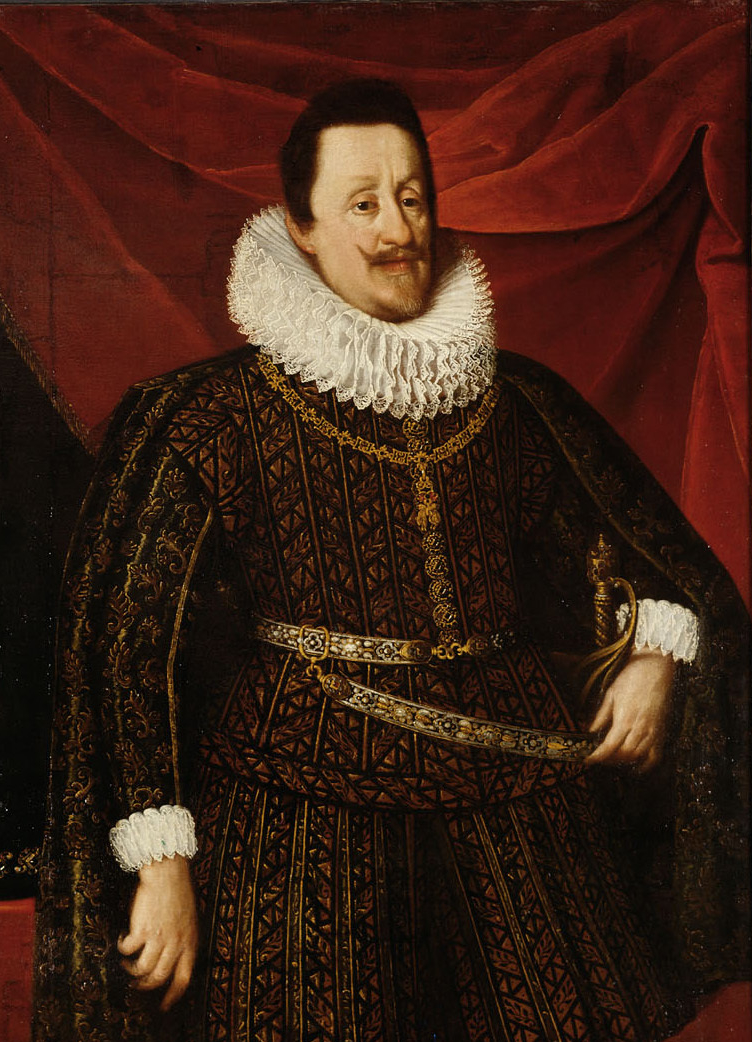
Ferdinand II, Holy Roman Emperor (1578–1637), who was elected King of Bohemia in 1617 and who would later claim that Frederick had usurped his rightful claim to the throne of Bohemia

Matthias, Holy Roman Emperor died on 20 March 1619. Although his successor, the future Emperor Ferdinand II, had previously been crowned King of Bohemia, the Estates of Bohemia now refused to recognise him as their king. Fearing an invasion by Imperial forces, the Estates sought an alliance with the other members of the Lands of the Bohemian Crown (Silesia, Lusatia, Moravia) and on 31 July 1619 at Prague, these states formed the Bohemian Confederacy, dedicated to opposing the Habsburgs; under the terms of this agreement, Protestantism became virtually the state religion of the Bohemian lands. In August 1619, the general parliament of all the Bohemian lands declared that Ferdinand had forfeited the Bohemian throne. This formally severed all ties between Bohemia and the Habsburgs and made war inevitable. Ferdinand of Bavaria, Archbishop of Cologne predicted this decision would lead to twenty, forty, or sixty years of war.

The preferred candidate of Bohemians as their new king was the Elector of Saxony, but he let it be known he would not accept the throne. This left Frederick as the most senior Protestant prince available, since no one else was willing to risk conflict with the emperor. In August 1619, the chances of Frederick becoming King of Bohemia became greater when Gabriel Bethlen launched an anti-Habsburg revolt in Royal Hungary. This was also precisely the period when Ferdinand was travelling to Frankfurt for his coronation.

=== Frederick in Prague ===
On 26 August 1619, the states of the Bohemian Confederacy elected Frederick as the new King of Bohemia, Frederick receiving news of his election on 29 August in Amberg.

Two days later, Ferdinand II was elected Holy Roman Emperor. Frederick was the only elector who voted against Ferdinand; even the Protestant prince-electors John George I of Saxony and John Sigismund of Brandenburg adhered to the tradition of supporting the Habsburg Imperial candidate. The electoral college also condemned the Bohemian Confederation's attempt to remove Ferdinand from the throne of Bohemia and declared that the 1617 vote of the Estates of Bohemia, making Ferdinand King of Bohemia, was binding.

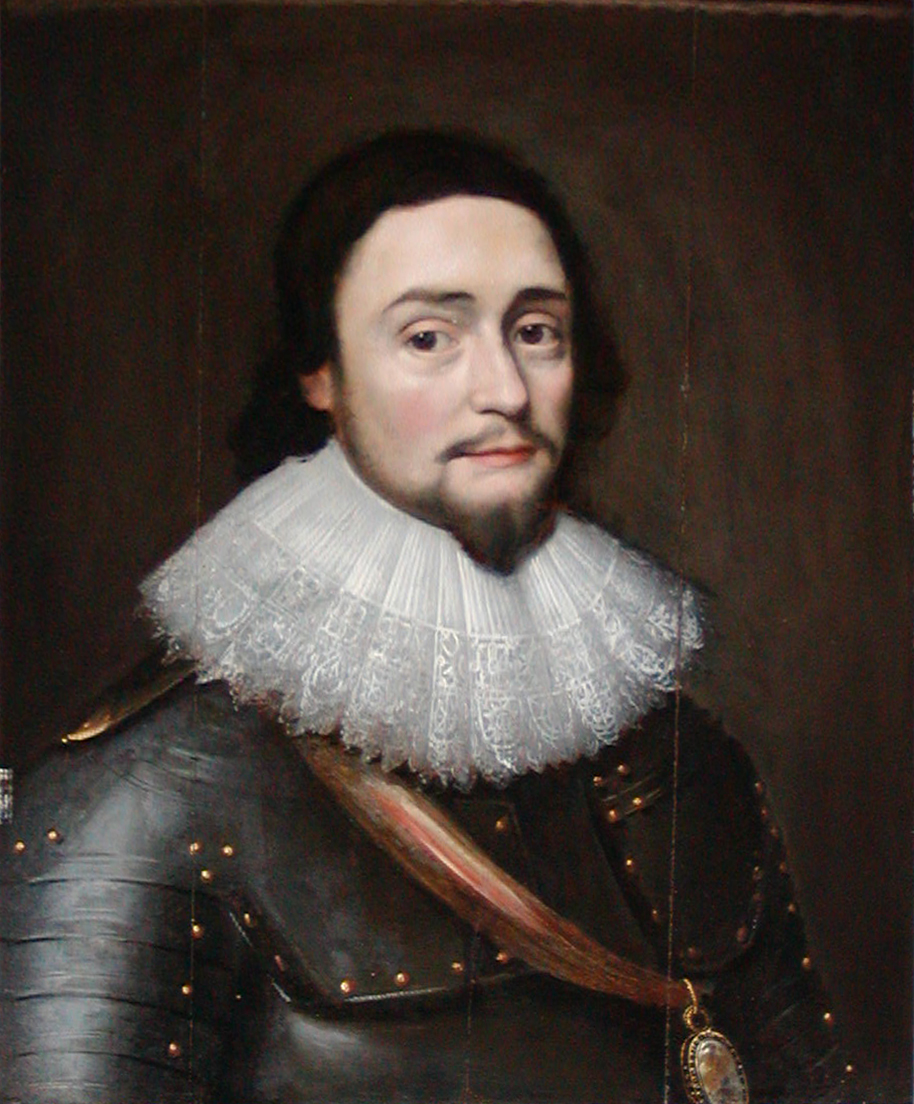
Frederick

Frederick's decision to accept the Bohemian crown has been the subject of much historical speculation. Later Catholic propaganda, in a view accepted by Friedrich Schiller, portrayed the decision as based mainly on Elizabeth Stuart's desire to be a queen. More recently, historians have concluded that Frederick's decision was based primarily on a sense of duty to his fellow Protestants, although Frederick wavered between his obligations to the emperor and his commitment to his religious brethren. There also seems to have been economic considerations; the Upper Palatinate was at that time Europe's center for iron production, while Bohemia was a focal point for the tin and glass trade. Christian I, Prince of Anhalt-Bernburg, told Frederick that a union of the two areas could be commercially advantageous.

On 12 September 1619, the Protestant Union met at Rothenburg ob der Tauber and called on Frederick not to intervene in Bohemian affairs. Other possible allies – the Dutch Republic, Charles Emmanuel I, Duke of Savoy, and the Republic of Venice – sent letters saying they would not be able to offer Frederick assistance if he accepted the Bohemian offer. Only Gabriel Bethlen offered words of encouragement.

Between 24 September and 28, Frederick reached his decision "not to resist the will of the Almighty" and thus decided to accept the Bohemian crown. The Dutch Republic, the Republic of Venice, Denmark, and Sweden recognised Frederick as King of Bohemia.

On 29 September 1619, Frederick left Heidelberg for Prague. He travelled through Ansbach, Amberg, Neumarkt, and Waldsassen, where he was met by representatives from the Bohemian Estates. Together, they then travelled through Cheb, Sokolov, Žatec, Louny, and Slaný. Finally on 31 October 1619, Frederick entered Prague, along with 568 people and 100 cars, and was greeted enthusiastically.

=== Coronation ===
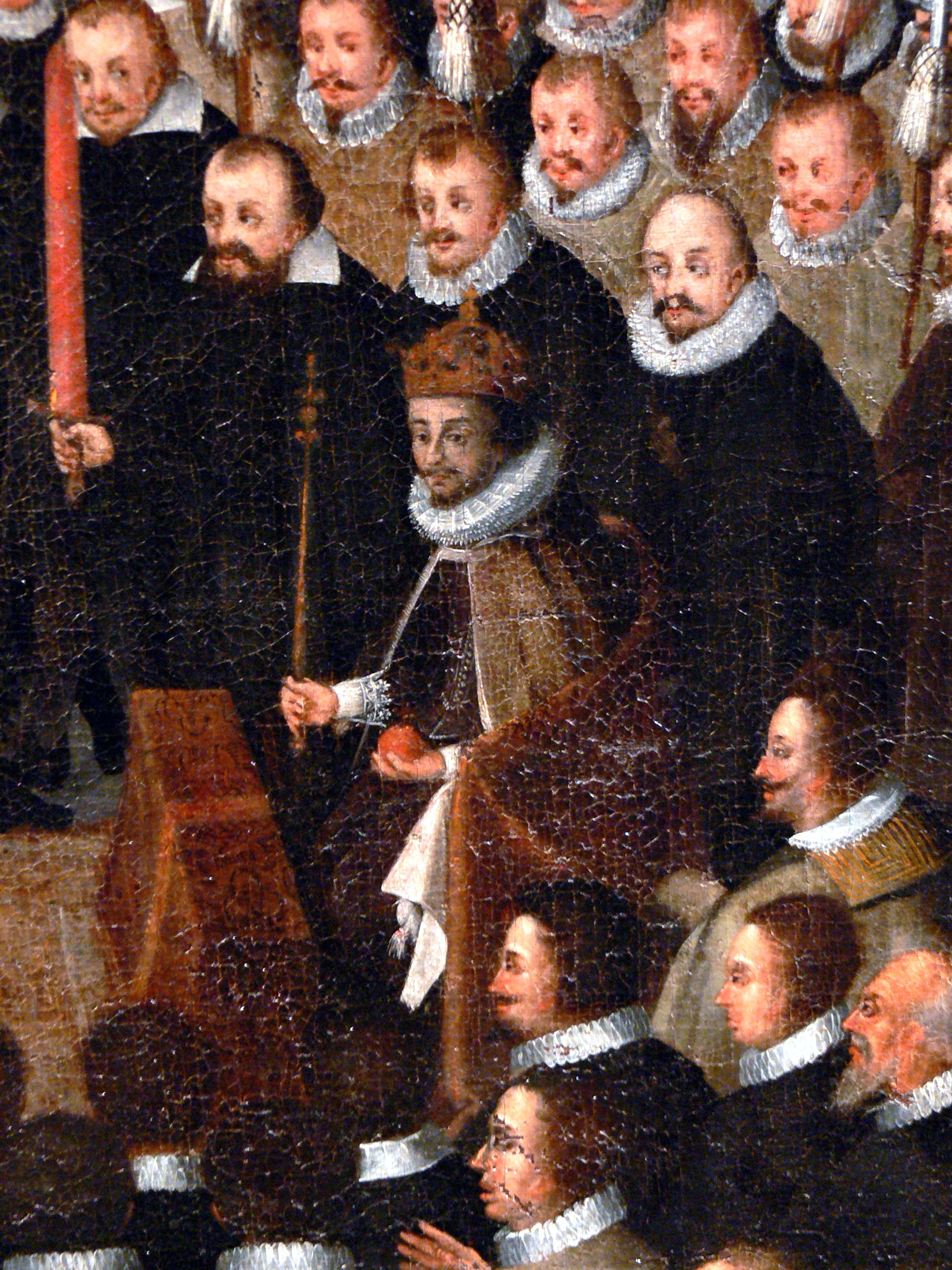
Coronation of Frederick V in St. Vitus Cathedral, 4 November 1619

Frederick donned the Crown of Saint Wenceslas in St. Vitus Cathedral on 4 November 1619. The coronation was conducted not by the Archbishop of Prague but by the Utraquist administrator of the diocese, Jiřík Dicastus, and a Protestant elder, Jan Cyril Špalek z Třebíče. The liturgy was modelled on that used at the coronation of Charles IV, with only a few parts altered. The litany was sung – per the Catholic tradition – rather than spoken as was normally done by the Calvinists. Frederick was anointed with little objection. At the end of the coronation, the Estates paid homage to Frederick.

Although a large part of the country was already devastated by war, and many refugees were encamped in the town, the coronation was celebrated with lavish parties.

=== Reign ===
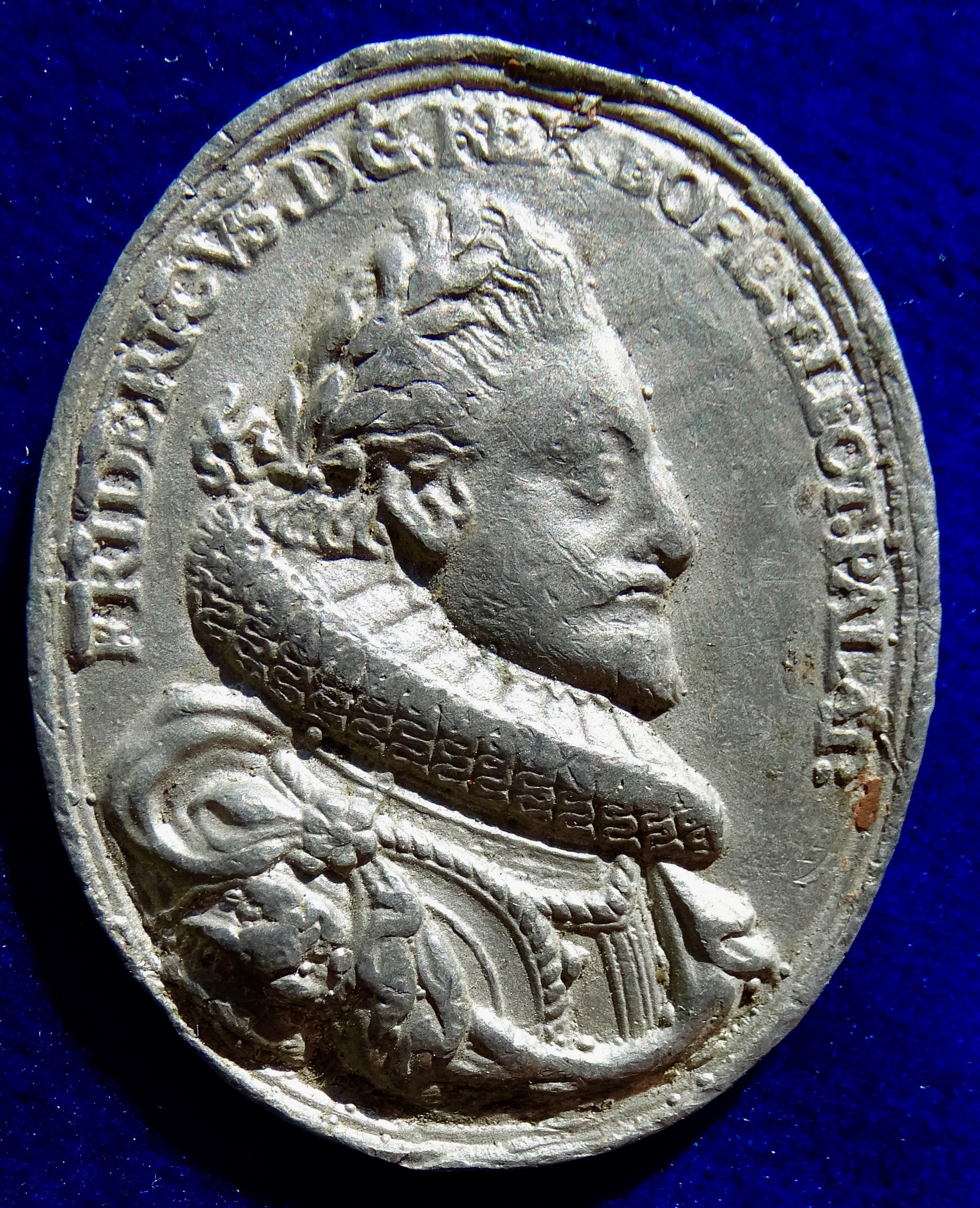
Bohemia 1620, retrospective coronation medal of King Frederic Elector Palatine of the Rhine. Obverse

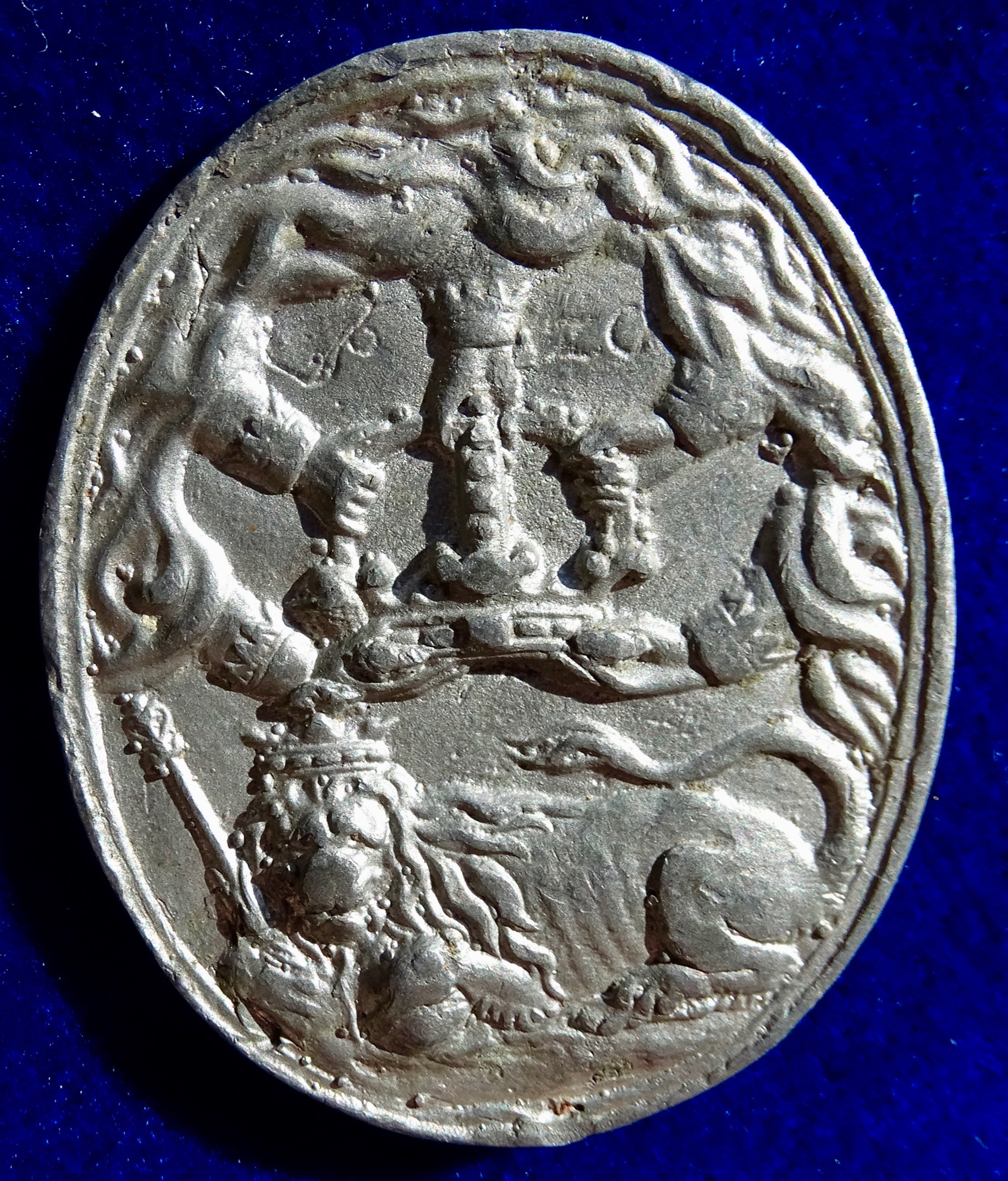
The reverse of this medallion: 5 hands holding the Bohemian royal crown over the Palatinate Lion lying with a scepter in his right paw, and his left paw lying on the orb

Frederick assumed a weak crown and a state torn with internal divisions. The state's finances had been disrupted for years, and, at any rate, Bohemian kings had only very limited ability to raise funds, being primarily dependent on the goodwill of the nobility and the tax allocations of the diets. The Protestant nobles felt that higher taxes were necessary to pay for war against the German Catholic League, but the country already felt overburdened in the wake of the Long War. Further limiting Frederick's ability to manoeuvre was the need to distribute royal bounty to supporters in order to ensure their loyalty to his regime.

In Prague, Frederick soon came to be alienated from a portion of the nobility and the clergy. Neither Frederick nor his wife spoke Czech, so court offices were staffed primarily with foreigners, while the administration of the localities was left to the local nobles. This made an alliance of the royal family with the corporate bodies of the realm difficult.

Further alienation was caused by Frederick V's court preacher, Abraham Scultetus, who was determined to use his new post to advance the cause of Calvinism in Bohemia. The Utraquist churches had retained the use of relics and images in church, but Scultetus now launched an iconoclastic crusade against images: beginning on 21 December 1619, images were removed from St. Vitus Cathedral, and on 27–28 December, the famous Prague Altarpiece of Lucas Cranach the Elder depicting the Virgin Mary was destroyed. There was even a rumour that the grave of St. Wenceslaus was to be desecrated. Scultetus' iconoclasm was deeply unpopular, and Frederick attempted to distance himself from it, claiming that his orders were not being carried out by his followers.

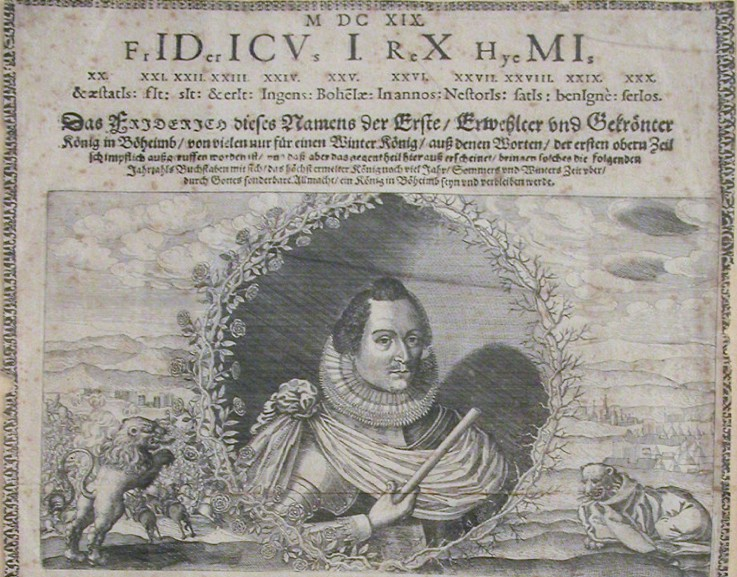
This 1619 Imperial pamphlet, containing a chronogram, was the first to dub Frederick "The Winter King".

The nickname "The Winter King" appeared shortly after the beginning of Frederick's reign and our first printed reference using the term came in a 1619 Imperial pamphlet that presented the phrase in the context of a royal chronogram. Frederick's propagandists attempted to respond to the phrase by arguing that Frederick was in fact a "Winter Lion" who defended the crown of Bohemia against troublemakers and liars, and that he would also be a "Summer Lion."

Meanwhile, Ferdinand II rallied his forces against Frederick. On 21 October 1619, he signed a treaty with Maximilian, Duke of Bavaria, leader of the Catholic League. This treaty provided that Maximilian would be commander of the forces against Frederick, promised that Maximilian would retain all of the occupied Bohemian lands for himself, and that he would be granted Frederick's electoral title as well. The Emperor was also able to obtain the support of Elector John George I of Saxony; John George's court preacher, Matthias Hoe von Hoenegg, encouraged the Emperor to smash Frederick and the Bohemians.

Frederick's chancellor, Christian of Anhalt, urged Frederick to call a meeting of Protestant princes at Nuremberg in December 1619. This conference was a fiasco, as few princes bothered to send representatives. John George of Saxony declined to send a representative. Those who did attend half-heartedly promised to secure Frederick's Rhineland territories during Frederick's absence in Bohemia.

In March 1620, during a meeting of the Imperial party at Mulhouse, Frederick despatched a legal defense of his actions. He argued that he had not broken the imperial peace because Bohemia was located outside of the Holy Roman Empire and there was not, therefore, a conflict between an imperial prince and the emperor. Frederick argued that it would therefore be illegal for Ferdinand to use imperial power against him. This meeting, which included John George of Saxony and Maximilian of Bavaria, rejected Frederick's argument, finding that Bohemia was an indivisible part of the Empire.

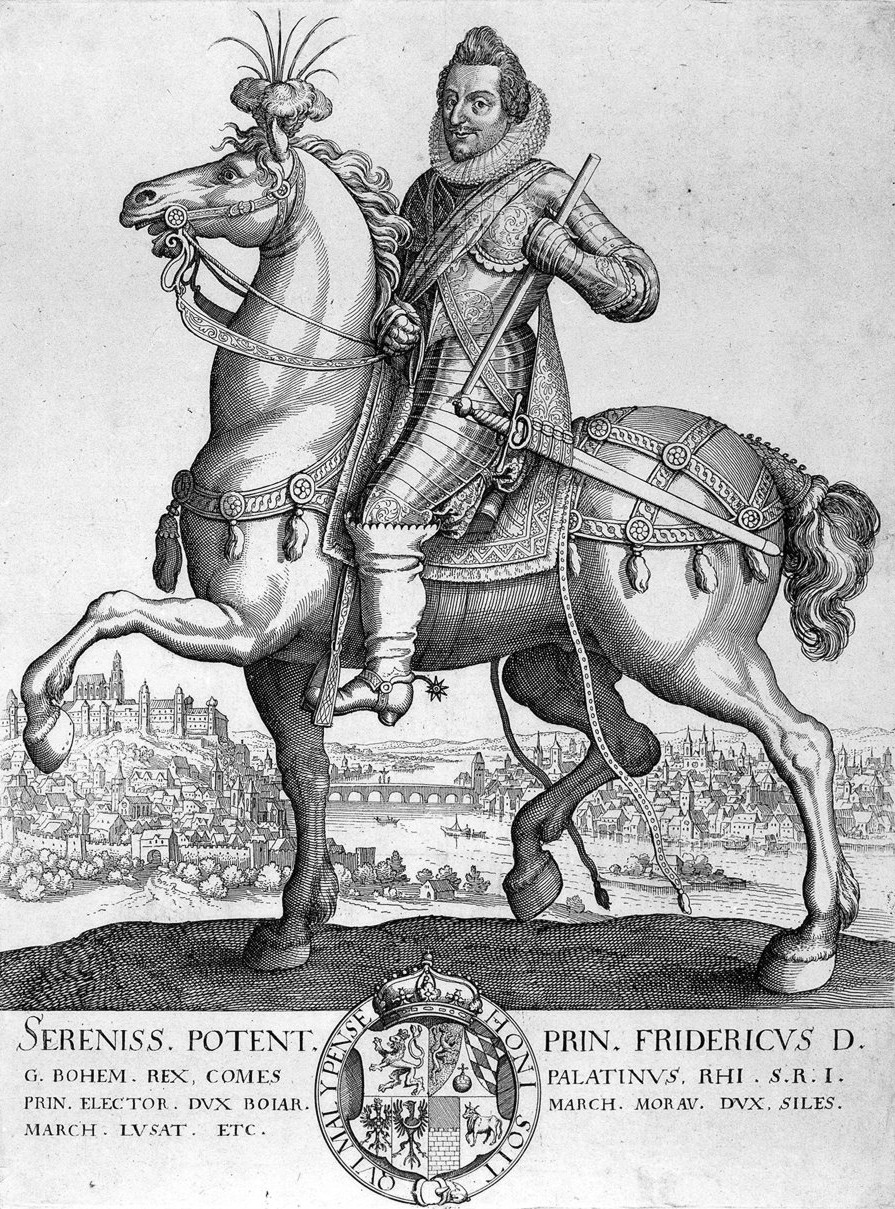
Frederick V on horseback with Prague in the background

On 1 April 1620, the Imperial party issued an ultimatum calling on Frederick to leave Bohemia by 1 June. If Frederick did not comply by this date, Ferdinand threatened to enforce his right as Holy Roman Emperor and rightful King of Bohemia to overthrow the usurper.

A little later, John George of Saxony signed a treaty with Ferdinand in which Ferdinand guaranteed the practice of Lutheranism in Bohemia and recognized the secular areas in the Netherlands. Ferdinand also agreed to give John George Lusatia, thus cementing John George's dominance of the Upper Saxon Circle.

This was the context when the parliament of the Bohemian Confederacy met on 25 March 1620. Frederick called for massive tax increases and conscription to fight the impending Imperial threat. To raise money for the Bohemian forces, Frederick used his private funds, pawned his jewels and, in May 1620, drove the Palatinate into insolvency when he decided to move two tons of gold to Bohemia.

Bad news continued to arrive for Frederick. James VI of Scotland and I of England refused to support his son-in-law militarily. The Netherlands sent only a small force and promised only 50,000 florins a month for Frederick. Worst of all for Frederick, on 3 July 1620, the Protestant Union signed the Treaty of Ulm (1620), thereby withdrawing their support for Frederick and declaring neutrality in the conflict between Frederick and the Catholic League.

==== Battle of White Mountain, 8 November 1620 ====
With the signing of the Treaty of Ulm Ambrogio Spinola, 1st Marquis of the Balbases, began raising Imperial troops in the Spanish Netherlands and in the Alsace region.

In early August 1620, 25,000 troops, under the command of Spinola, marched into Bohemia. In the third week of August, they shifted their focus and marched into the nearly unarmed Electoral Palatinate, occupying Mainz. The Electoral Palatinate was defended by only 2,000 English volunteers and the country was easily taken. Imperial troops set up camp in Frankenthal and Mannheim. Spinola crossed the Rhine on 5 September 1620 and proceeded to capture Bad Kreuznach on 10 September and Oppenheim on 14 September. From Bohemia, Frederick was powerless to stop the occupation of his ancestral homeland.

Depiction of the Battle of White Mountain by Peter Snayers (1592–1667), 1620

After capturing Linz, Upper Austria, Maximilian, Duke of Bavaria crossed the Bohemian border on 26 September 1620. At Rokycany, Maximilian's forces first met with the 15,000 ragtag, poorly paid and poorly equipped troops that Frederick had managed to raise. Frederick visited his army on 28 September 1620, but, lacking a military background, left the conduct of the war to his generals. Frederick focused his attention on organizing supplies and preparing fortifications.

After a series of skirmishes, on 5 November 1620, Frederick drew his forces back towards Prague and Imperial troops followed them. On 7 November, Bohemian forces determined to make a stand at White Mountain, just outside Prague. The day before, King Frederick had ridden down the lines and exhorted the soldiers. He then rushed to Prague to implore the Bohemian Estates to raise money for his troops and to receive the envoys of the English king. However, it was too late. When, on 8 November 1620, Frederick wanted to ride back to the troops, he was met at the gates of Prague by fleeing soldiers of his army and his chancellor, Anhalt, who informed him of the disaster: the Bohemian army had received a crushing defeat that morning in the Battle of White Mountain.

=== Escape ===
Anhalt could recommend only one option to Frederick: immediate flight. As such, on 9 November, Frederick fled to the Silesian capital of Breslau, along with his wife and child, some advisers, and not much more baggage than the Bohemian Crown Jewels. Maximilian took Prague shortly after Frederick's departure. From Silesia, Frederick wanted to plan revenge for the Battle of White Mountain, but the Silesian Estates refused to support this project, and he was forced to leave Silesia in early 1621.

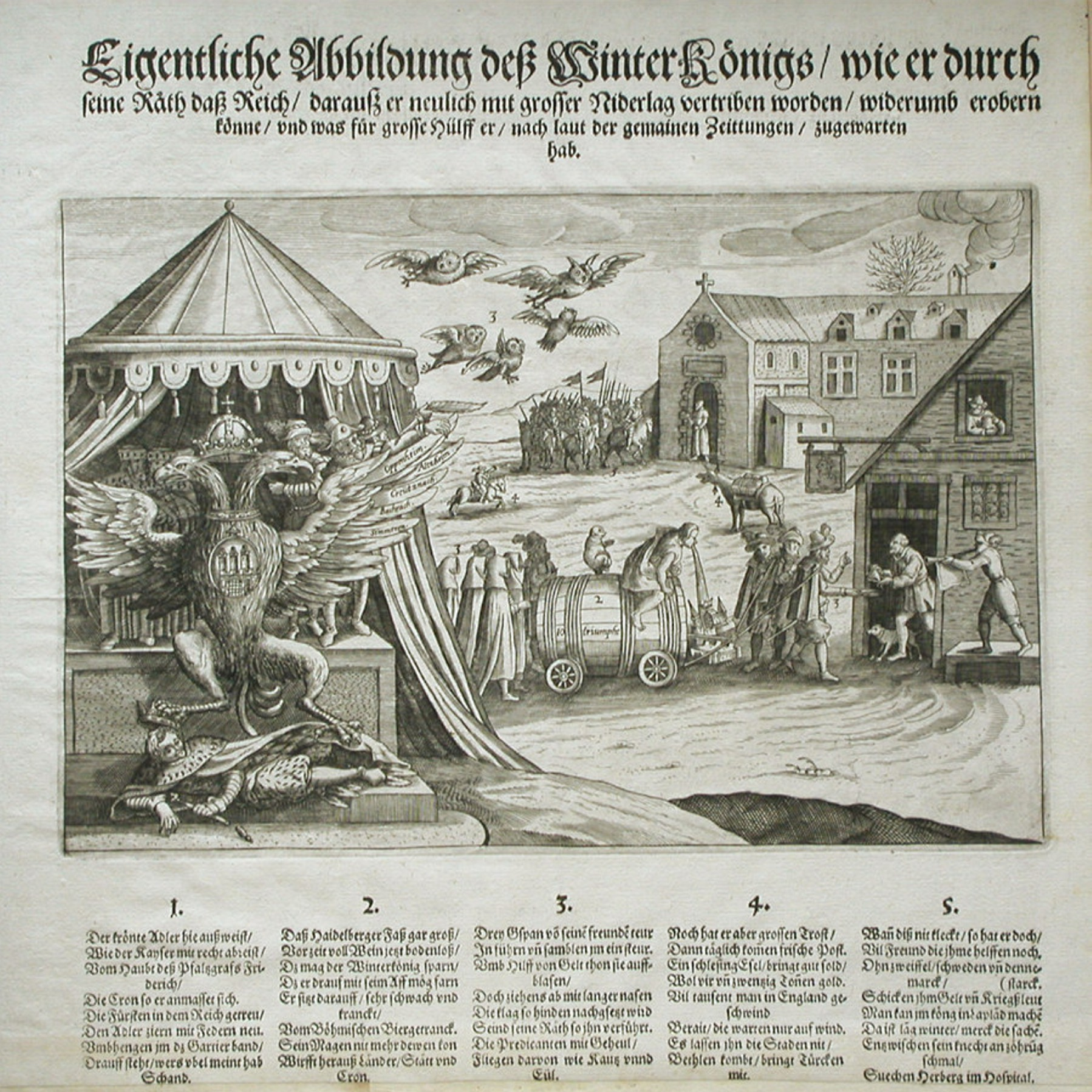
1620 pamphlet mocking Frederick's flight from Prague

Contemporary pamphleteers – both Catholic and Protestant – were merciless in their portrayal of Frederick's flight from Prague. After Frederick's Garter was found in Prague, pamphleteers routinely portrayed him with his stockings falling down.

On 21 January 1621, Ferdinand issued a decree against Frederick and Anhalt, accusing them of breach of peace, supporting rebels, and treason. Ferdinand decreed that Frederick's lands and titles within the Holy Roman Empire were now forfeited. On 6 February 1621, representatives of the Protestant Union met with Ferdinand at Heilbronn to protest, but they soon agreed to support the settlement in the Palatinate, and the Palatinate remained occupied by Spanish troops. At this point, the Protestant Union had essentially ceased to exist.

The Twelve Years' Truce ended on 9 April 1621. On 14 April, Frederick joined his wife at The Hague. The Dutch Republic and Frederick signed a contract in which he accepted the support of the Netherlands for the reconquest of his dominions. In Bohemia, the crushing of the Bohemian Revolt had terrible consequences. Twenty-seven Bohemian nobles were killed in the Old Town Square executions on 21 June 1621. Afterwards, the heads of twelve nobles, along with the hand of Joachim Andreas von Schlick, were nailed to the Old Town Tower of Charles Bridge, where they remained for ten years. The elective monarchy was now abolished; the role of the Estates greatly curtailed; and the Letter of Majesty was torn by Ferdinand himself. Only Lutheranism remained tolerated in Bohemia, and in the coming years, the rest of the population would be actively re-Catholicized. Bohemia would remain part of the Habsburg monarchy until 1918.

== Fall of Frederick's ancestral lands, 1621–22 ==
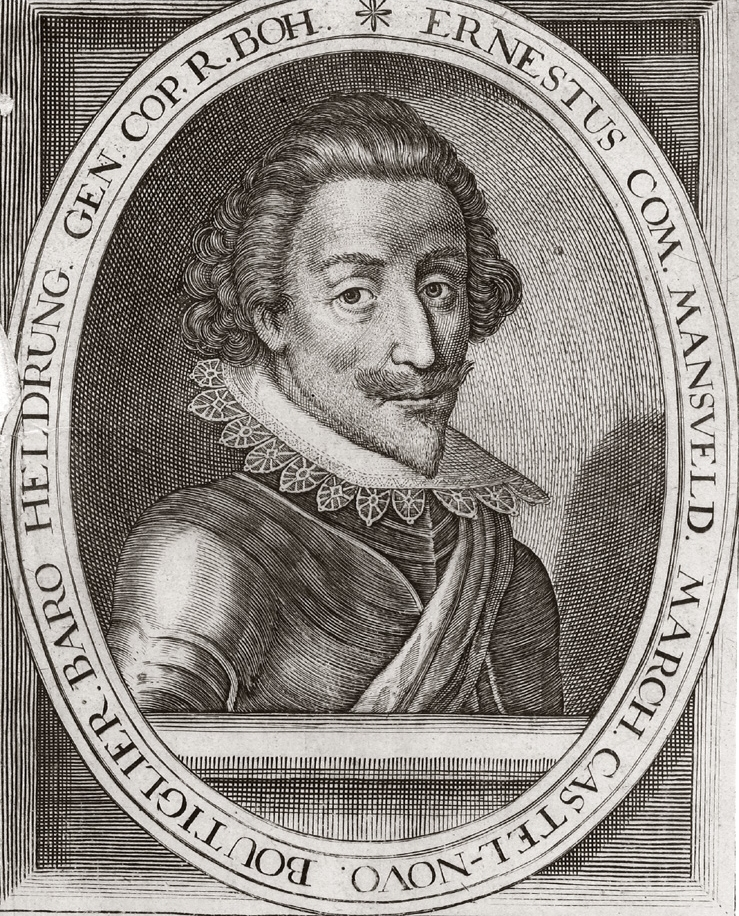
Ernst von Mansfeld (1580–1626), soldier who held on to Frederick's Palatine inheritance until 1622

In summer 1621, John II, Count Palatine of Zweibrücken, Frederick's former guardian who had served as regent of the Electoral Palatinate when Frederick left for Prague, resigned. Frederick was also at this time placed under the Imperial ban, which permitted the forfeiture of his territories and effectively rendered him an outlaw. However, Ernst von Mansfeld continued to occupy a portion of the Upper Palatinate and had successfully resisted efforts by Johann Tserclaes, Count of Tilly to dislodge him. Mansfeld crossed into the Rhenish Palatinate in early 1622, and on 21 April 1622, Frederick joined Mansfeld there. Frederick attempted to convince other Protestant princes to reconstitute the Protestant Union, but met with limited success. Frederick's cause was boosted by a 27 April 1622 victory over Tilly's forces at the Battle of Wiesloch, but this boost was short lived. Frederick's forces under the command of Georg Friedrich, Margrave of Baden-Durlach were defeated at the Battle of Wimpfen on 6 May 1622; and then forces under Christian the Younger of Brunswick were soundly defeated at the Battle of Höchst on 20 June 1622.

Frederick was increasingly under Mansfeld's influence at this time, and was growing disillusioned with the Protestant cause. With Frederick's knowledge, Mansfeld raided Darmstadt and captured Louis V, Landgrave of Hesse-Darmstadt and his son Johann as hostages. This was clearly a violation of Imperial law, and cost Frederick whatever remaining sympathy he still had in Europe. During his retreat into Alsace, Mansfeld burned a city and thirty villages.

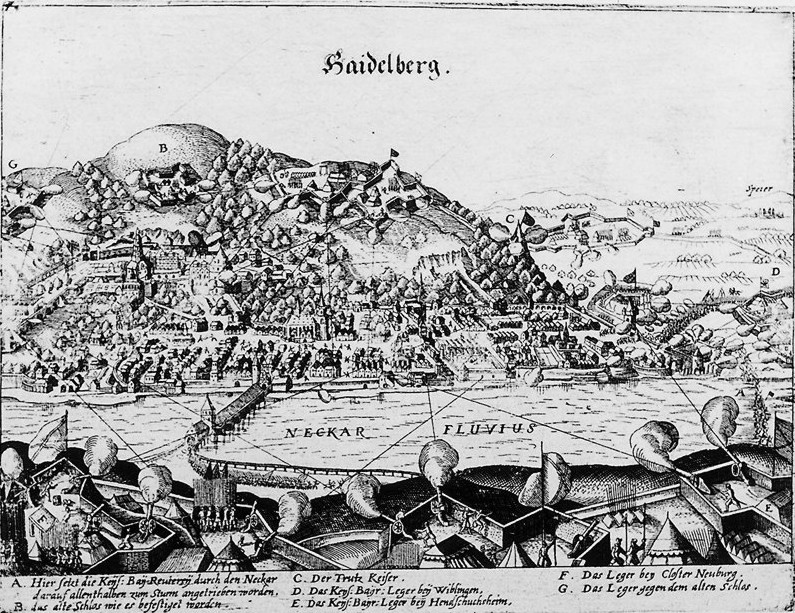
Heidelberg is taken by the forces of Johann Tserclaes, Count of Tilly (1559–1632) on 19 September 1622.

Frederick dismissed Mansfeld after he became convinced he would be unable to reconquer his hereditary lands. Frederick then spent the summer with his uncle, Henri de La Tour d'Auvergne, Duke of Bouillon, in Sedan. Shortly thereafter, troops under Tilly and Gonzalo Fernández de Córdoba completed the Spanish conquest of the Electoral Palatinate. After an eleven-week siege, Heidelberg fell on 19 September 1622; Mannheim similarly fell on 5 November 1622. Only the British garrison in Frankenthal now held out. After the conquest of Heidelberg, the Protestant churches were closed, the university was closed, and at the request of Maximilian, the great library, the famous Bibliotheca Palatina (3500 manuscripts), was presented as a gift of thanks to Pope Gregory XV in appreciation of the 620,000 guilders he had provided for financing the campaigns of the Catholic League.

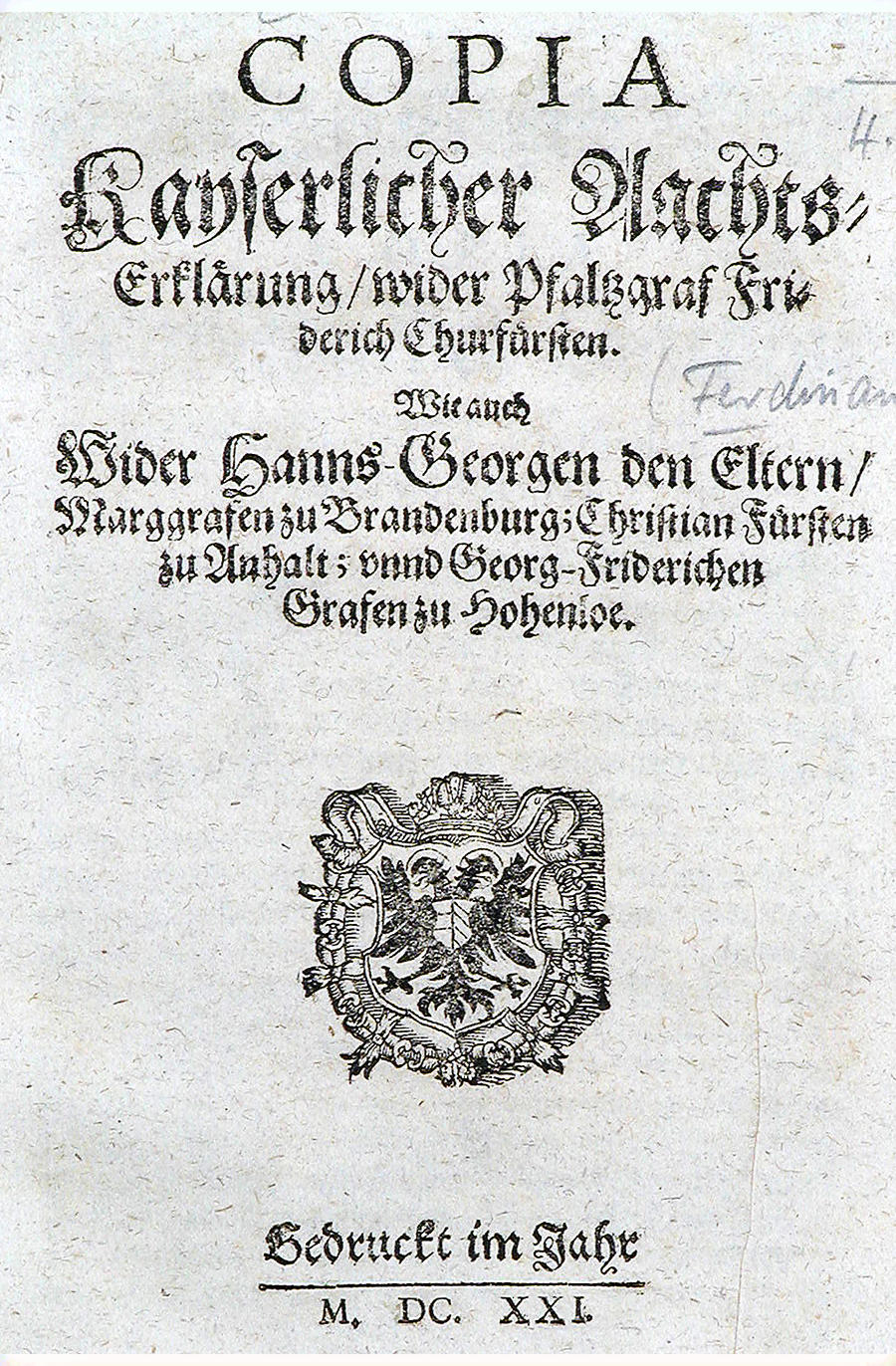
1623 edict by Ferdinand II, Holy Roman Emperor (1578–1637) awarding Frederick's lands and titles to Maximilian I, Elector of Bavaria (1573–1651)

On 23 February 1623, Ferdinand II, Holy Roman Emperor awarded Frederick's electoral title to Maximilian of Bavaria, who now became Maximilian I, Elector of Bavaria. Maximilian was also awarded the conquered territory of Upper Palatinate as a fief. Other territories of the Electoral Palatinate (Parkstein, Weiden in der Oberpfalz, and Peilstein im Mühlviertel) were awarded to Wolfgang William, Count Palatine of Neuburg.

== Exile, 1622–1632 ==
In late 1622 and early 1623, Frederick organised a Palatinate government-in-exile at The Hague. This Palatinate council was headed by Ludwig Camerarius. During the negotiations for the Spanish match, Frederick urged his father-in-law not to go through with the match. There were attempts at reconciling Frederick with the emperor in 1624–25 and in 1627, but these came to naught. Frederick was willing to compromise with the emperor, but he wanted the restoration of his lands and electoral title, and the emperor was not inclined to restore these to Frederick. Frederick held out some hope that his lands might be retaken militarily, but these hopes were crushed on 27 August 1626, when the forces of Christian IV of Denmark were crushed by Tilly at the Battle of Lutter.

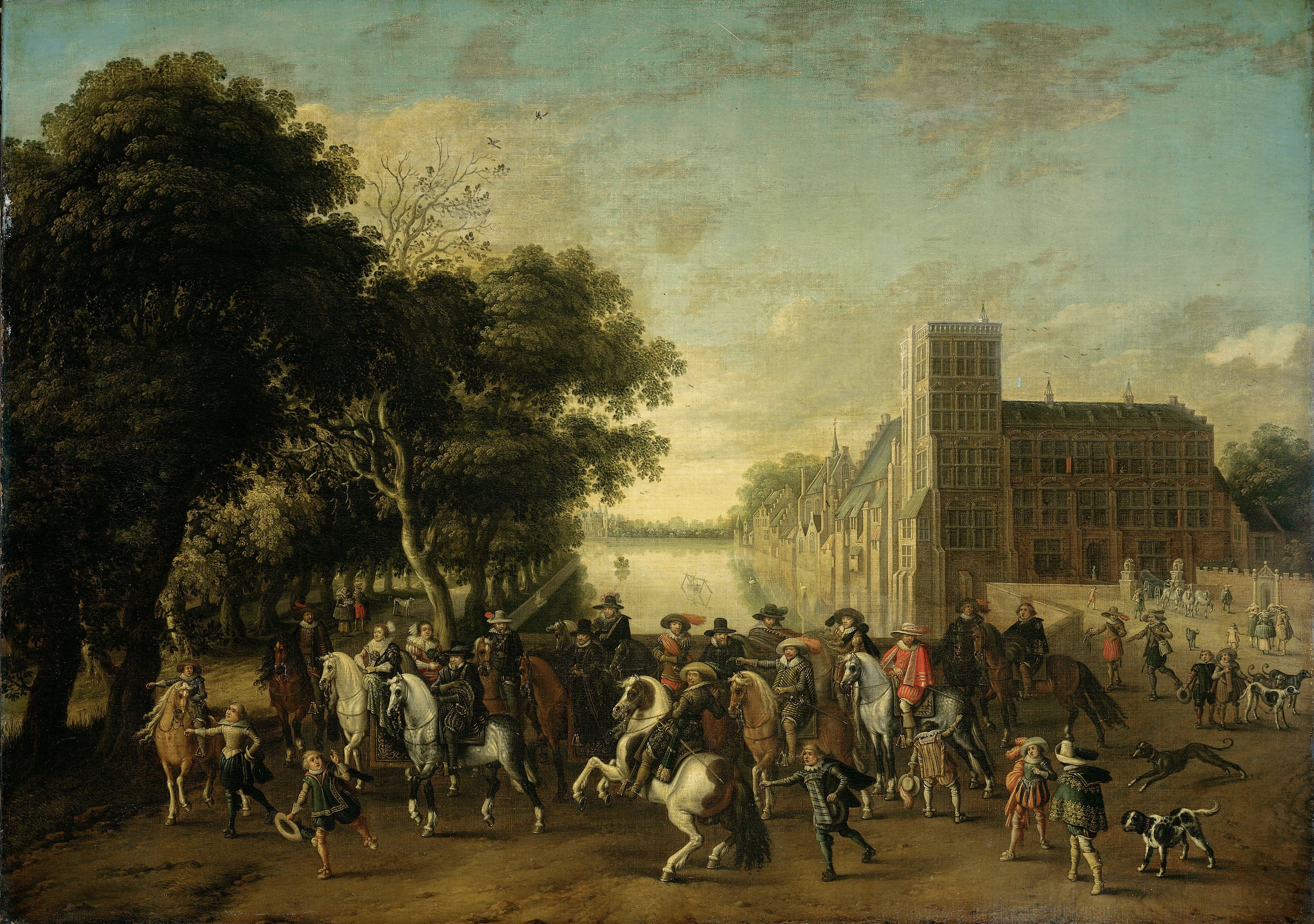
Frederick and his wife Elizabeth in the company of Maurice, Prince of Orange, Prince Frederick Henry, and others at the Buitenhof in The Hague

Frederick left most of the day-to-day business of his government-in-exile to his counselors, although he did take some interest in his finances. Frederick was very stingy in funding his administration, and yet, in order to maintain the dignity of a royal court, he spent vast sums on building and entertainment, quickly blowing through donations from the English and Dutch governments. For example, in 1629, Frederick commissioned Bartholomeus van Bassen to build him a large summer palace in Rhenen, the 'Koningshuis'. When completed in 1631, this palace had a large central residence, a courtyard, a two-storey main building with two wings projecting to the south, and was surrounded by large gardens. Frederick spent much of his time there in hunting and long walks.

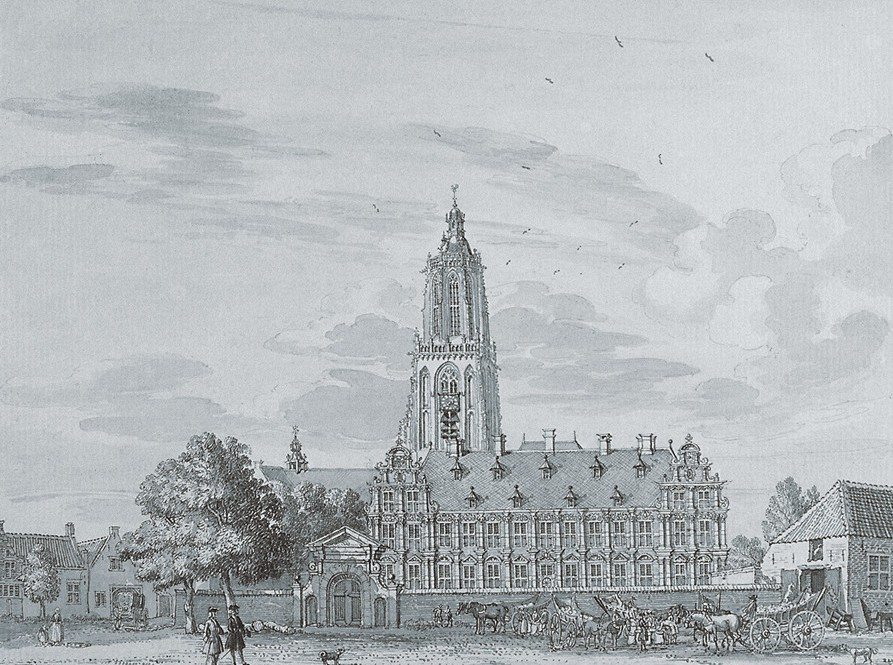
The winter palace constructed for Frederick V at Rhenen between 1629 and 1631

Frederick suffered a personal tragedy on 17 January 1629. He was traveling to Amsterdam to view the Spanish treasure fleet captured by the Dutch West India Company when his boat capsized while crossing the Haarlemmermeer, a body of water near Haarlem. Frederick survived the accident, but his eldest son, the fifteen-year-old Frederick Henry of the Palatinate, did not. Frederick himself sustained serious physical injuries in the accident, and would not fully recover for 15 months. At the Diet of Regensburg (1630), Frederick formally petitioned to be forgiven for having accepted the crown of Bohemia and admitted his wrongdoing. But nothing came of this. In March 1631, Frederick despatched diplomat Sir Robert Anstruther to hold discussions with Ernst Egon VIII, Count of Fürstenberg, president of the Imperial Privy Council, about restoring Frederick's lands, but Frederick died before these could bear any fruit.

== Death ==
In 1630, King Gustavus Adolphus of Sweden intervened in the Thirty Years' War on the Protestant side. He won the Battle of Breitenfeld (1631) against the Imperial army and marched into southern Germany. When the Swedes captured Oppenheim in December 1631, Frederick believed the time was ripe for him to reestablish himself in the Palatinate, and he left for Heidelberg. In February 1632, Frederick met Gustavus Adolphus at Frankfurt, with Gustavus Adolphus paying Frederick full royal honours. However, Gustavus Adolphus did not offer Frederick support for restoring him in the Palatinate because England and the Netherlands had not signed off on such a proposal.

Frederick subsequently took part in Gustavus Adolphus' march into the Duchy of Bavaria, and was present for the march into Munich on 17 May 1632. He pressed his case with Gustavus Adolphus, who told Frederick that he would accept Frederick's restoration without Dutch/British support only if Frederick would agree to hold the Palatinate as a fief of the King of Sweden. The lands of the Palatinate were simply too important strategically for Gustavus Adolphus to hand them over to Frederick. Gustavus Adolphus also insisted that Frederick would have to establish equal rights for Lutherans in his territories. Frederick refused Gustavus Adolphus' conditions and they parted. Frederick travelled to Swedish-occupied Mainz, intending to return to the Hague.

About this time, England finally determined to send an expeditionary force to Germany. Unfortunately for Frederick, it was too late. Gustavus Adolphus was killed at the Battle of Lützen (1632) on 16 November, and in October, Frederick developed an infection that got worse in the following weeks. The famed physician Peter Spina was summoned from Darmstadt to Mainz, but nothing could be done for Frederick. He died on the morning of 29 November 1632, of a "pestilential fever".

Frederick's son and heir, Charles I Louis, was only 15 years old. Therefore, his uncle, Frederick's brother Ludwig Philipp of Simmern-Kaiserslautern, served as regent. Frederick's internal organs were buried at St. Catherine's in Oppenheim and his embalmed body was taken to Frankenthal. On 9 June 1635, with Spanish troops approaching, Ludwig Philipp fled to Kaiserslautern with Frederick's body. It is believed that Ludwig Philipp transferred Frederick's body to Sedan in September 1637, but Frederick's final resting place is unknown.

== Ancestry ==
Ancestors of Frederick V of the Palatinate

8. Frederick III, Elector Palatine
4. Louis VI, Elector Palatine
9. Marie of Brandenburg-Kulmbach
2. Frederick IV, Elector Palatine
10. Philip I, Landgrave of Hesse
5. Elisabeth of Hesse
11. Christine of Saxony
1. Frederick V, Elector Palatine
12. William I, Count of Nassau-Siegen
6. William I, Prince of Orange
13. Juliana of Stolberg
3. Louise Juliana of Orange-Nassau
14. Louis III, Duke of Montpensier
7. Charlotte of Bourbon
15. Jacqueline de Longwy

== Family and children ==
He married Elizabeth Stuart, the daughter of James VI of Scotland and I of England and of Anne of Denmark in the Chapel Royal, Whitehall on 14 February 1613 and had the following children:

1. Frederick Henry (1614–1629)—(drowned)
2. Charles Louis (1617–1680), became Elector Palatine in 1648
3. Elisabeth (1618–1680) Protestant abbess and philosopher.
4. Rupert (1619–1682) of English Civil War fame.
5. Maurice (1620–1652) also served in the English Civil War.
6. Louise Hollandine (1622–1709) Catholic abbess and painter.
7. Louis (1623–1624), died in infancy.
8. Edward (1625–1663) converted to Catholicism in France.
9. Henriette Marie (1626–1651)
10. Philip Frederick (1627–1650) soldier for France, killed in action.
11. Charlotte (1628–1631) died young.
12. Sophia (1630–1714), heir presumptive to the thrones of England and Ireland by the Act of Settlement, 1701. Married Ernest Augustus, Elector of Hanover. Her son became King George I of Great Britain in 1714.
13. Gustavus (1632–1641), died young, of epilepsy.

== Notes ==
Frederick V of the Palatinate House of Palatine Simmern Cadet branch of the House of Wittelsbach Born: 26 August 1596 Died: 29 November 1632
Regnal titles
Preceded by Frederick IV	Elector Palatine; 1610–1623	Succeeded by Charles I Louis
Preceded by Ferdinand II	King of Bohemia; 1619–1620	Succeeded by Ferdinand II
