= Hortus Palatinus =

Former garden in Heidelberg Castle, Germany

Coordinates: 49.4111°N 8.7175°E

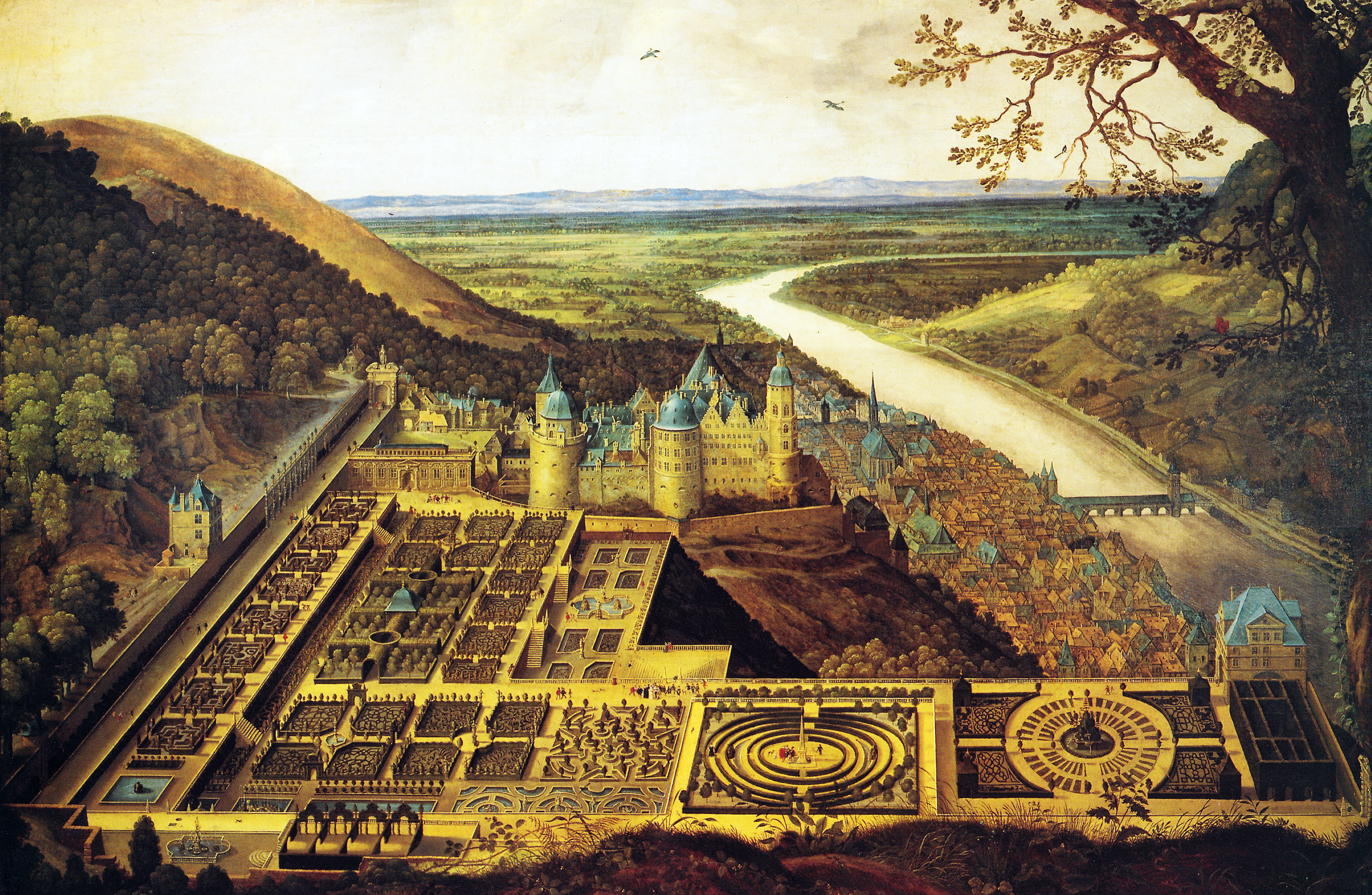
Heidelberg Castle and the Hortus Palatinus, showing the large, multi-level terraced garden.

The Hortus Palatinus, or Garden of the Palatinate, was a Baroque garden attached to Heidelberg Castle, Germany. The garden was commissioned by Frederick V, Elector Palatine in 1614 for his new wife, Elizabeth Stuart, and became famous across Europe during the 17th century for the landscaping and horticultural techniques involved in its design. At the time it was known as the 'Eighth Wonder of the World', and has since been termed 'Germany's greatest Renaissance garden.'

== Construction ==
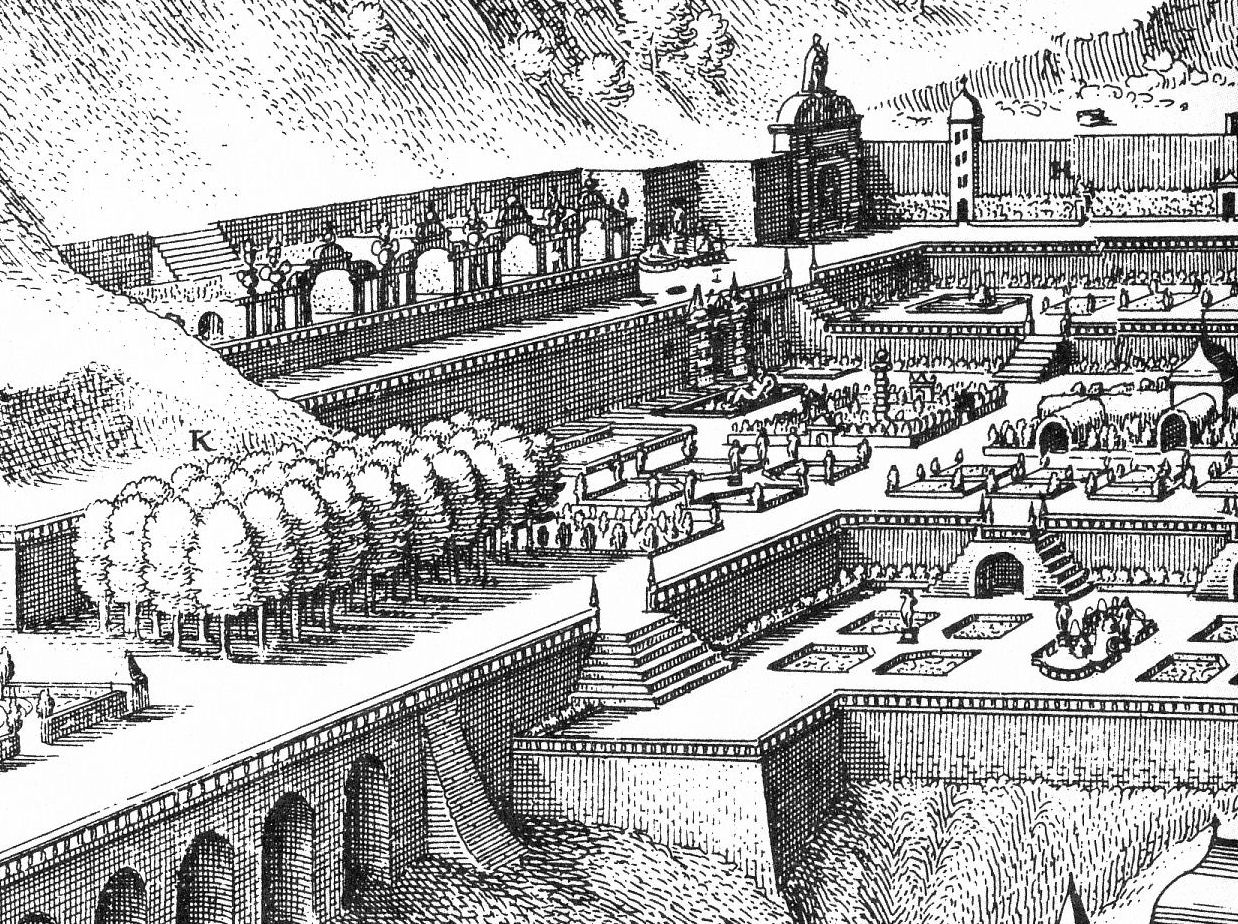
Detail of the multi-level terracing of the Hortus Palatinus, which required the 'toppling the peaks of the mountains' by Salomon de Caus.

The Hortus Palatinus was commissioned by Frederick V, the ruler of the Palatinate, a leading member of the Holy Roman Empire and the head of the Protestant Union, with a martial family tradition stretching back several centuries. Frederick had spent the winter of 1612 in England, where he married Elizabeth Stuart, the daughter of King James I. Although the match had a political purpose – effectively uniting the Protestant lines of England, the Palatinate, the Dutch House of Orange-Nassau and Denmark – the two were genuinely in love, and remained a romantic couple throughout the course of their marriage. Frederick returned to Heidelberg, his capital, ahead of his bride and set about transforming his castle, creating an 'English wing' for her, a monkey-house, a menagerie – and the beginnings of a new garden in the Italian Renaissance style popular in England at the time.

Frederick had met the English designer Inigo Jones and the French engineer Salomon de Caus at King James' court. De Caus had been involved in constructing a Baroque garden for the Prince of Wales, Prince Henry at Richmond Palace, but this project had been halted following the prince's death in 1612. De Caus was also a favourite of Elizabeth Stuart's, having been her tutor before her marriage. From July 1614 onwards de Caus began work in Heidelberg on a new set of gardens. Some writers suspect that de Caus transferred many of his potential ideas from the Richmond project to Heidelberg, applying them on a larger scale.

One major challenge that the engineers faced was the uneven ground – the steep, mountainous terrain around the castle had to be flattened and levelled up into a huge multi-leveled terrace. The result – a large 'L' shape around the castle – was then furnished between 1614 and 1619 with statues, grottos, plants, flowers and tall trees, surrounded in turn by the Heidelberg forest. The lay-out of the various exotic plants, many from the then recently discovered tropics, reflects their geographical origins and religious connotations. De Caus was also particularly proud of the orange tree grove he created, populated with thirty sixty-year-old orange trees specially transferred using his own methods, a significant horticultural accomplishment during the period. Other dramatic features included a water organ in imitation of the Roman writer Vitruvius' design, clockwork-driven musical automata birds who sang as nightingales and cuckoos, mazes and a recreation of the legendary animated statue of Memnon. The result was a hugely impressive Baroque garden in the Italian Renaissance style, dubbed by contemporaries the 'Eighth Wonder of the World'.

== Symbolism ==
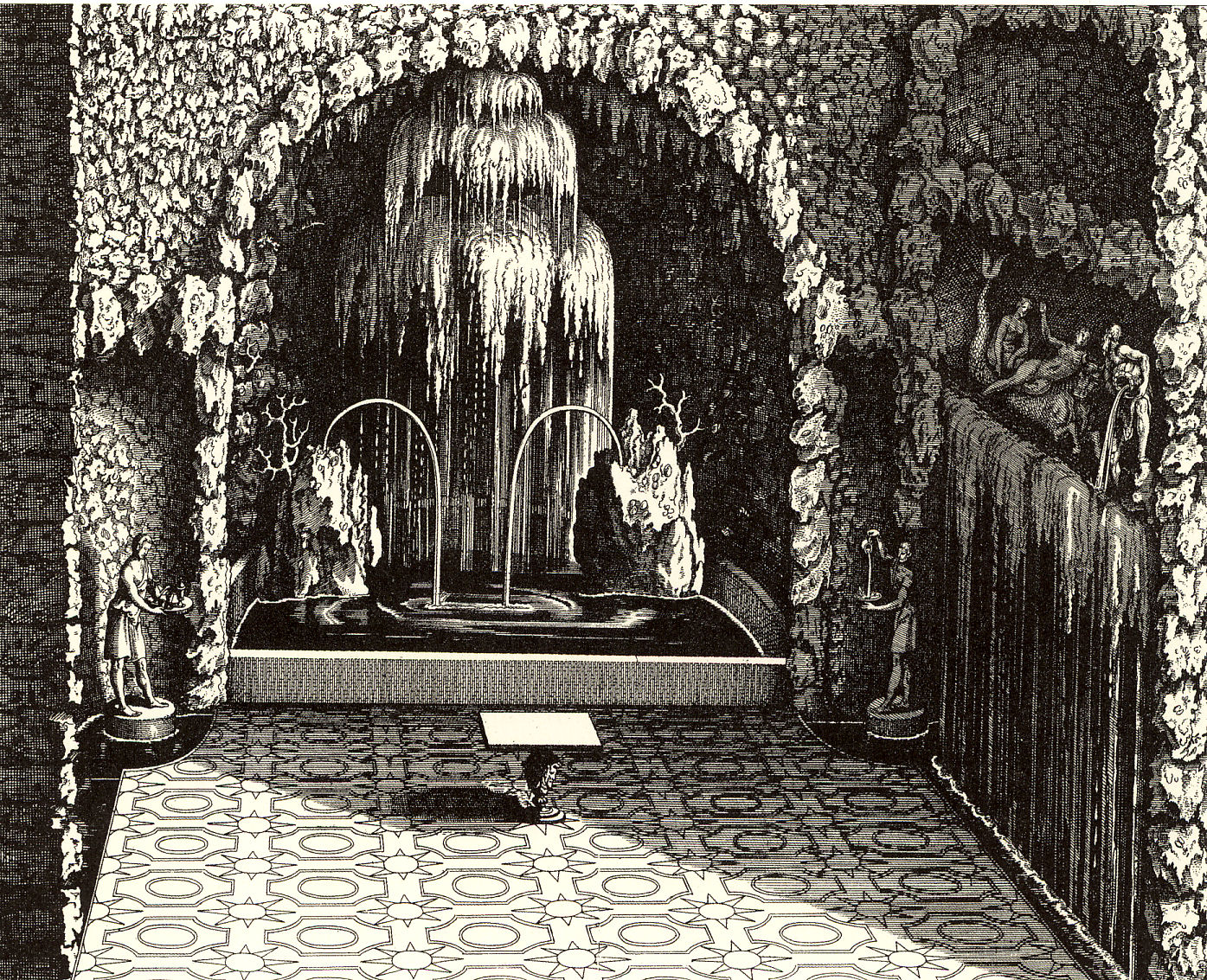
One of Salomon de Caus's grottos, allegedly containing Rosicrucian meanings.

The elaborate and ornate Hortus Palatinus have been interpreted in various ways. The dominant modern interpretation of the Hortus Palatinus is that is a 'magic' or 'hermetic' garden. In this model, drawing on de Caus's alleged mystical Rosicrucian background, the complex gardens become an allegory of Rosicrucian thought, a 'botanical cosmos', containing a coded secret deep in their design. In this interpretation, the gardens are intended to capture 'a universal vision, based on a union of the arts, science and religion', combined with 'an ancient tradition of secret wisdom handed down over the ages'.

Another popular modern interpretation believes that the gardens were designed consciously to communicate a powerful, symbolic political message. Frederick V had political ambitions beyond the Palatinate; as the head of the Protestant Union and the senior elector within the Holy Roman Empire he had hopes for wider hegemony across Germany. In 1619 Frederick would challenge Emperor Ferdinand II for control of Bohemia. Frederick's gardens accordingly symbolised a hugely powerful ruler, mimicking the Roman emperors; the iconography stresses the role of Frederick as a powerful ruler driving the creation of the gardens, 'toppling the peaks of the mountains' and dominating nature as he restructures the world around him. Even the water in the garden, shown in the statues to be commanded by Neptune, is in turn surmounted by images of Frederick commanding Neptune himself.

An alternative interpretation of the gardens argues that – although made in the English style – de Caus designed them with the broad European late Renaissance style firmly in mind, drawing on his experiences of north Italian, and particularly Tuscan gardens. In this minority interpretation, the political symbols and metaphors of the garden are of less importance than the underlying topoi of similar looking gardens across Europe – de Caus was building a garden emulating – and trying to exceed in size and scope – other popular gardens of the day.

== Destruction of the garden ==
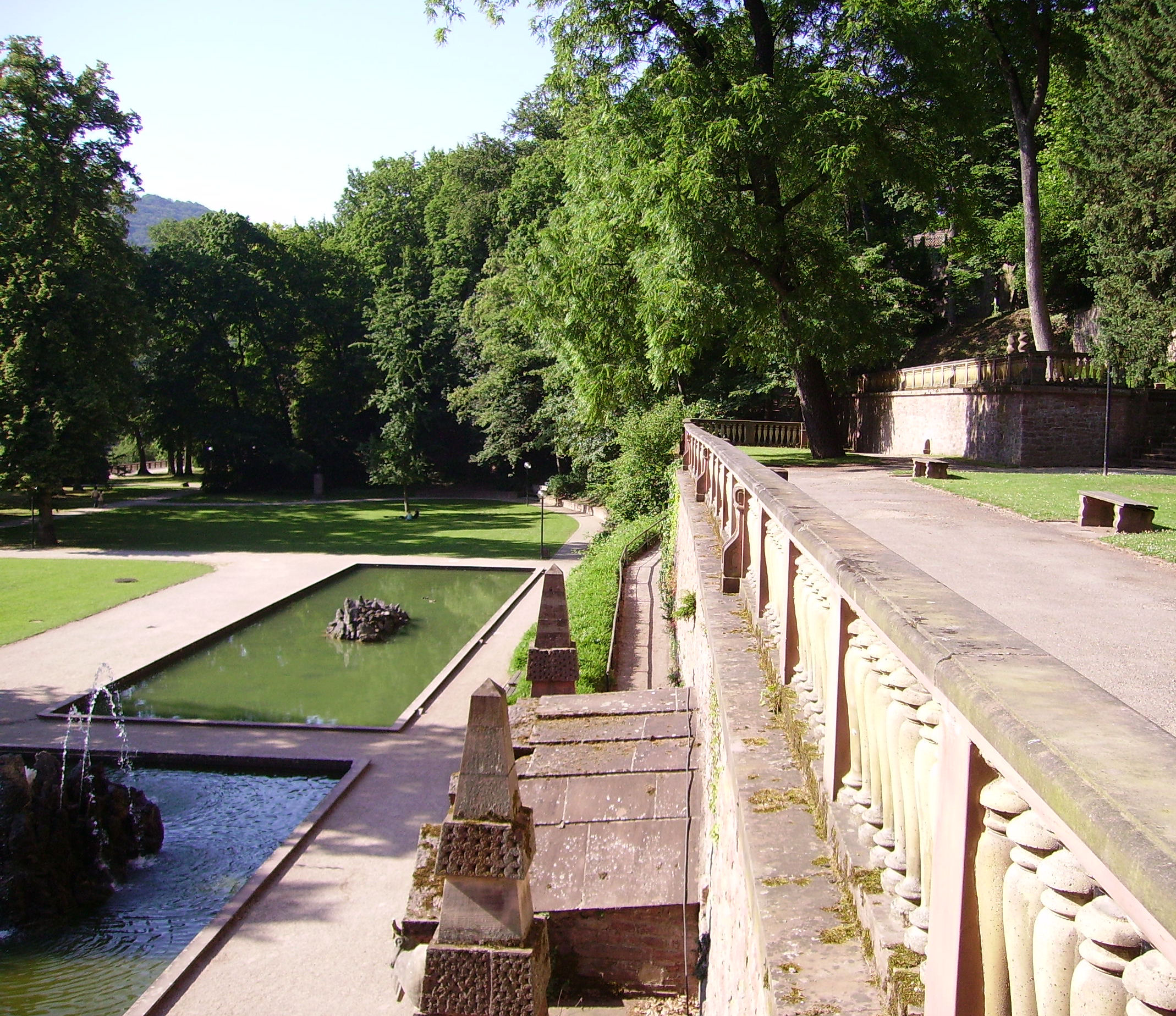
The ruins of the gardens in modern Heidelberg today.

By 1619, the Hortus Palatinate had become 'Germany's greatest Renaissance garden', although it was still not fully completed. 1619, however, saw Frederick V's war with Emperor Ferdinand II over the Kingdom of Bohemia; soundly defeated at the Battle of White Mountain, Frederick and Elizabeth were forced to flee the empire for a life in exile in the Hague. The Hortus Palatinate project was halted indefinitely, with de Caus leaving for Paris.

Heidelberg and the gardens suffered badly during the ensuing Thirty Years War; the ornate gardens were used as an artillery base for attacking the city. By the time that Frederick's son Charles Louis was returned to the lower Palatinate in 1648, the principality was in dire economic straits – pleasure gardens were a low priority for the new ruler. The Hortus Palatinate became ruins and today these are considered a popular, romantic tourist attraction. The gardens, as represented in de Caus' original designs, were recreated digitally at the European Media Laboratory in Heidelberg in 2003.

== Bibliography ==
- Davidson, Peter. The Universal Baroque. Manchester: Manchester University Press. (2007)
- Grove, Richard H. Green Imperialism: Colonial Expansion, Tropical Island Edens and the Origins of Environmentalism, 1600-1860. Cambridge: Cambridge University Press. (2006)
- Hart, Vaughan. Art and Magic in the Court of the Stuarts. London: Routledge. (1994)
- Hunt, John Dixon. (ed) Garden History: Issues, Approaches, Methods. Dumbarton Oaks. (1992)
- Kassel, Richard. The Organ: An Encyclopedia. London: Routledge. (2006)
- McIntosh, Christopher. Gardens of the Gods: Myth, Magic and Meaning. London: I.B.Tauris. (2005)
- Morgan, Luke. Nature as model: Salomon de Caus and early seventeenth-century landscape design. University of Pennsylvania Press. (2007)
- Smith, Evans Lansing. Ricorso and Revelation: an Archetypal Poetics of Modernism. London: Camden House. (1995)
- Spencer, Charles. Prince Rupert: the Last Cavalier. London: Phoenix. (2008)
- Turner, Tom. Garden History: philosophy and design, 2000 BC—2000 AD. Abingdon: Spon Press. (2005)
- Zimmermann, Reinhard. Iconography in German and Austrian Renaissance Gardens. in Hunt (1992)
