= Salomon de Caus =

French engineer (1576–1626)

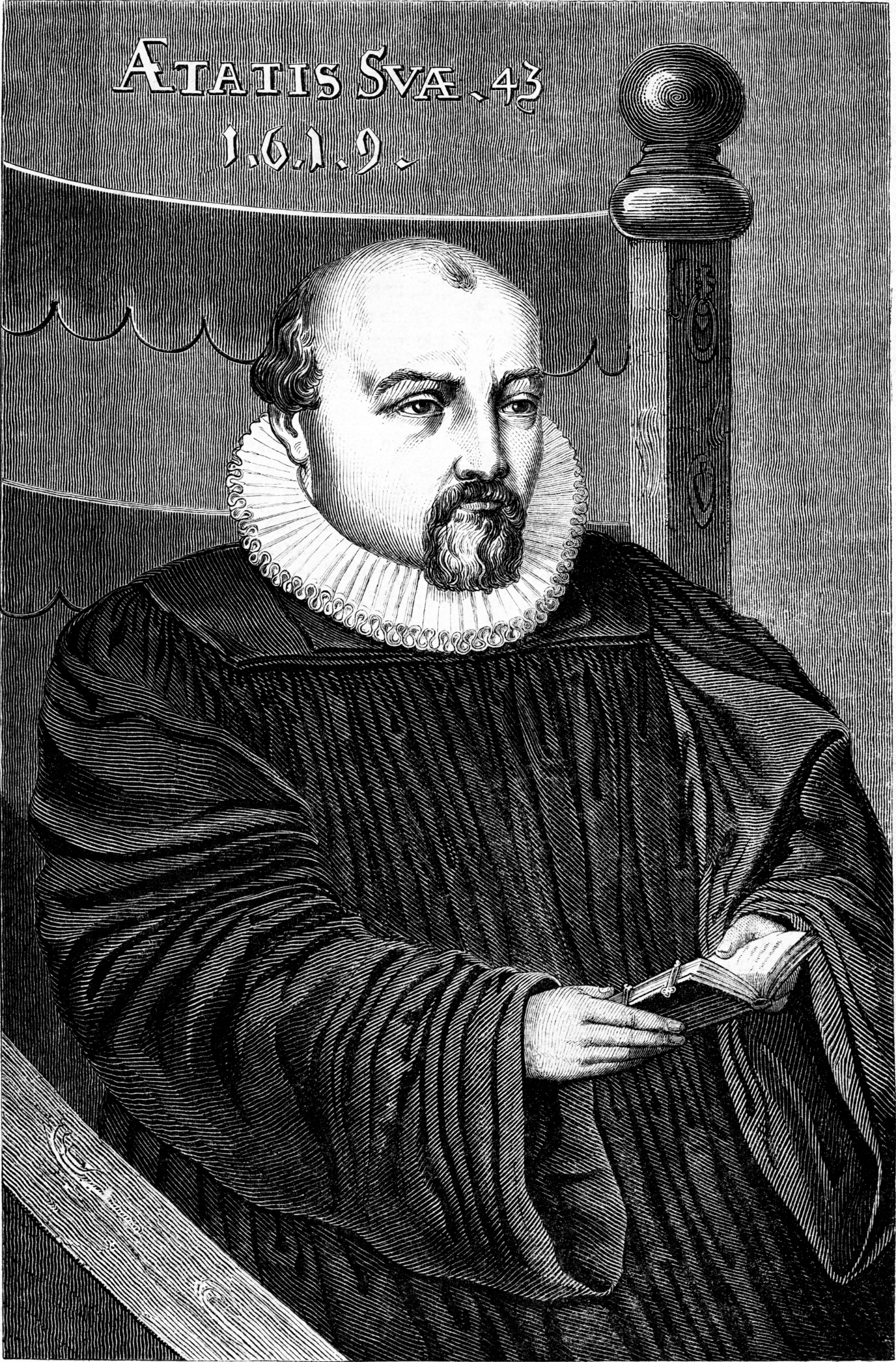
Salomon de Caus

Salomon de Caus (1576, Dieppe – 1626, Paris) was a French engineer and architect.

His work covered fields as diverse as architecture, mechanics, hydraulics, perspective, music, organ building and sundials. He decorated royal residences in England with ingenious mechanical inventions and built palaces in Germany. He was among the first to use steam power in the design of a hydraulic machine. Despite his many achievements, his life remained little known until modern times.

== Biography ==
Caus was the elder brother of Isaac de Caus. Being a Huguenot, Caus spent his life moving across Europe.

He worked as a hydraulic engineer and architect under Louis XIII. Caus also designed gardens in England, that of Somerset House among them; also, the Hortus Palatinus, or Garden of the Palatinate, in Heidelberg, Germany.

Caus arrived in England late in 1610 or in the first months of 1611. His first royal patron was Anne of Denmark or her son, Prince Henry who granted him a pension of £100 in 1610. Anne of Denmark made him a groom of her chamber, with the authors Samuel Daniel and John Florio.

In November 1611 Caus was advising the Earl of Salisbury at Hatfield House. He is described in the exchequer records beginning in 1611 or 1612 (the date is uncertain) as "Gardener to the Queen". He designed a fountain for the east garden of Hatfield House, and a receipt of May 1612 describes him as the Prince's engineer.

He worked at Greenwich Palace and Denmark House where he made a fountain with an artificial "rock". An engineer Richard Barnwell made a pump for the fountain. The "rock" represented Mount Parnassus and featured shells and a cavern inhabited by the nine Muses. On top was a figure of Pegasus and nearby a female personification of the River Thames in black marble. At Greenwich, Caus may have designed a grotto which served as an aviary. He revamped the gardens at Richmond Palace for Prince Henry, and worked at Heidelberg for Elizabeth of Bohemia. King James gave him a gift of £50 in 1614.

In 1615, he published Les Raisons des forces mouvantes which showed a steam-driven pump similar to one developed by Giovanni Battista della Porta fourteen years earlier. Nevertheless, François Arago called him the inventor of the steam engine as a result. Caus also describes a just-intonation scale, now known as the Ellis Duodene, after Alexander John Ellis who reinvented it. Caus was one of the first to employ the term work in the sense that it is used in the modern field of mechanics.

== Works ==
- Hortus Palatinus (1620) at the University of Heidelberg
- La Perspective avec la raison des ombres et miroirs (1611)
- Les Raisons des forces mouvantes (1615)

== In popular culture ==
- Malcolm Pryce's 2015 novel "The Case of the 'Hail Mary' Celeste refers to de Caus as the originator of the idea of using steam to power wheeled transport.
- Salomon de Caus is also described in Hans Andersen's story "The Thorny Path" as the discoverer of the power of steam.
