= George Frederick, Margrave of Baden-Durlach =

Margrave of Baden-Durlach

Georg Friedrich, Margrave of Baden-Durlach
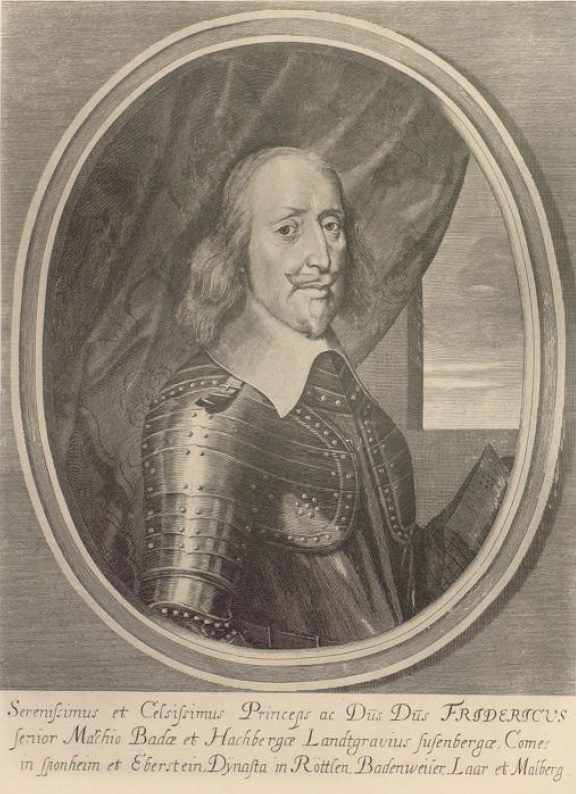
- George Frederick, Margrave of Baden-Durlach
- Born: 30 January 1573; Baden
- Died: 24 September 1638 (aged 65); Strassbourg
- Noble family: House of Zähringen
- Spouses: Juliane Ursula of Salm-Neufville; Agathe of Erbach; Elisabeth Stolz
- Father: Charles II, Margrave of Baden-Durlach
- Mother: Anna of Veldenz

George Frederick of Baden-Durlach (30 January 1573 – 24 September 1638) was Margrave of Baden-Durlach from 1604 until his abdication in 1622. He also ruled Baden-Baden.

He was the third son of margrave Charles II of Baden-Durlach and his second wife, Anna of Veldenz. He was the youngest of eight children and was only four years old when his father died.

He succeeded his brother Ernest Frederick as margrave in 1604. He also continued his brother's occupation of Baden-Baden. George Frederick was a prominent member of the Protestant Union.

He raised an army of 12,000 men at the beginning of the Thirty Years' War in 1618. When Catholic League forces under General Tilly approached Baden in 1622 (Palatinate campaign), he marched against them, but came too late for the Battle of Mingolsheim. Setting off to pursue the retreating Catholics, he was defeated at the Battle of Wimpfen, and his army was destroyed, a few days later.

In 1627 he joined the Danish army. He died at Strasbourg in 1638.

== Life ==
=== Early life ===
George Frederick was born in Baden to Charles II, Margrave of Baden-Durlach and Anna of Veldenz.

George Frederick was only four years old when he inherited the Margraviate of Baden-Sausenberg, necessating a regency. The regents were his mother Anna, Elector Palatine Louis VI (until 1583), Count Palatine Philip Louis of Neuburg and Duke Louis III "the Pious" of Württemberg.

In 1584, his elder brothers Ernest Frederick and James (d. 1590) and his mother (d. 1586) took over the guardianship. In 1595, George Frederick was declared an adult, and he took up government himself.

George Frederick learned the Latin, French and Italian languages and received his higher education in Strasbourg, where his brother James had studied earlier.

He went on a Grand Tour to Besançon, Dole, Basel and Siena.

=== Division of the Margraviate of Baden-Durlach ===
His elder brothers were declared adults in 1584. Ernest Frederick and James wanted to divide the inheritance, although their father's testament forbade this. However, the testament had not been properly signed and sealed, and the remaining guardians held that this meant that they could allow the brothers to divide the Margraviate. Ernest Frederick received Lower Baden, including the main towns Durlach and Pforzheim. James received the Margraviate of Baden-Hachberg.

George Frederick retained the southern parts of Baden-Durlach, the Lordships of Rötteln and Badenweiler and the County of Sausenburg. Thus, the Margraviate was fragmented further, after the earlier split into Baden-Baden and Baden-Durlach.

When George Frederick's elder brother James died in 1590, Baden-Hachberg fell back to his eldest brother Ernest Frederick, who gave it to George Frederick in 1595.

=== Ruler of Baden-Hachberg (1595-1604) ===
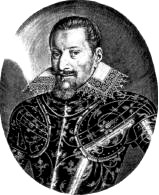
George Frederick of Baden-Durlach in 1603

Upon reaching adulthood, George Frederick became the ruler of Baden-Hachberg (Upper Baden). At first, he ruled from Rötteln Castle. In 1599 he moved his residence and the entire National Administration to Sulzburg). After the conversion of his brothers Ernest Frederick to strict Calvinism and James to Catholicism, George Frederick remained a Lutheran and founded his own Latin school in his small residence Sulzburg, so he would not have to depend on the Calvinist school in Durlach for the education of pastors in his territory. He constructed several buildings in Sulzburg, among them a real tennis hall. Between 1600 and 1610, he built the Castle Church in Sulzburg. Hence, the Margraviate of Baden-Durlach remained Lutheran since he survived the longest among his brothers.

George Frederick's lived in an ascetic manner. From the hand-written notes in his personal Bible, one can deduce that he has fully read through it at least 58 times. Shortly after he took office in Upper Baden, George Frederick introduced Johann Weininger as the new General Superintendent at the Synod of Rötteln. On this occasion he held a speech that resembled a sermon. In 1601, he promised the citizens of Pforzheim, who resisted the appointment of Reformed clergy by his brother Ernest Frederick, that he would support them when the case came before the Reichskammergericht.

In 1603, he issued a forestry regulation for the Margraviate of Sausenberg and the Lordship of Rötteln.

=== Margrave of Baden-Durlach (1604-1612) ===
When Ernest Frederick died in 1604, Baden-Durlach was inherited by George Frederick, reuniting it with Baden-Hachberg. He initiated a wide ranging set of legal, administrative, and religious reforms He established the Privy Council, which he presided himself. He created a high court and introduced a Church Order. George Frederick was aware that he could achieve his goal of a united Lutheran margraviate of Baden only with the support of the people. In return for approval of taxes to finance his defense policies, he conceded to the Estates the right to have a say in religious questions.

As early as 1603 George Frederick founded, in cooperation with the Estates of Upper Baden an exchange bank, which also managed orphan's pensions and later developed into a deposit bank. This bank was also meant to organize the trade in wine and grain and eliminate Jewist merchants. It also helped the margraviate to overcome the market crisis of the "Kipper und Wipper" period.

He initiated the codification of the civil code of Baden. The resulting statute has been describe as "the most thorough of any of the German territorial states". It was published in 1622, but due to the Thirty Years' War, it could not be brought into force until 1654, under his son and successor Frederick V. It remained in force until 1809.

In 1613, he had a religious dispute with Duke Francis II of Lorraine. He intended to argue the issue himself. This failed, however, when Francis, against an earlier agreement, sent Jesuits to argue the Catholic side of the dispute.

George Frederick saw the deteriorating situation in the empire, and in his own principality in particular, and studied not only theology, but also military themes. He was informed the Knight academy that Count John VI of Nassau-Dillenburg had founded in Siegen in 1616. Between 1614 and 1617, George Frederick wrote a treatise on modern warfare for his sons Frederick, Charles and Christopher; this treatise was never published in print.

=== Outbreak of the Thirty Years' War ===
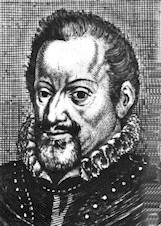
George Frederick of Baden-Durlach in 1630 showing scars from a wound to the head by a lance at the Battle of Wimpfen on 6 May 1622

Under Catholic influence, the ongoing court case before the Reichskammergericht about the ongoing occupation of Upper Baden threatened against George Frederick in 1622. He reacted with an armed intervention in the Bohemian Revolt, a conflict that formed the initial phase of the Thirty Years' War.

In 1608, George Frederick joined the Protestant Union. He was appointed as a general of the Union, a position which he held until it was dissolved in May 1621.

On 19 August 1612, George Frederick concluded a defensive alliance with the Protestant cities of Bern and Zurich, with which he wanted to protect Upper Baden, as it was enclosed by territories belonging to Further Austria. When the war broke out, his allies failed to provide military assistance. However, the alliance did enable George Frederick to recruit mercenaries in Switzerland in 1621 and 1622.

The bishop of Speyer, Philipp Christoph von Sötern, felt threatened by the surrounding Protestant powers and in 1615, he began expanding his residence in Udenheim into a fortress. He changed the name Udenheim into Philippsburg and began constructing Philipsburg Fortress, despite protests by the imperial city of Speyer, the Electorate of the Palatinate and the Margraviate of Baden. In 1618, Elector Palatine Frederick V, George Frederick and the city of Speyer decided to raze the fortress. It was nevertheless completed in 1623.

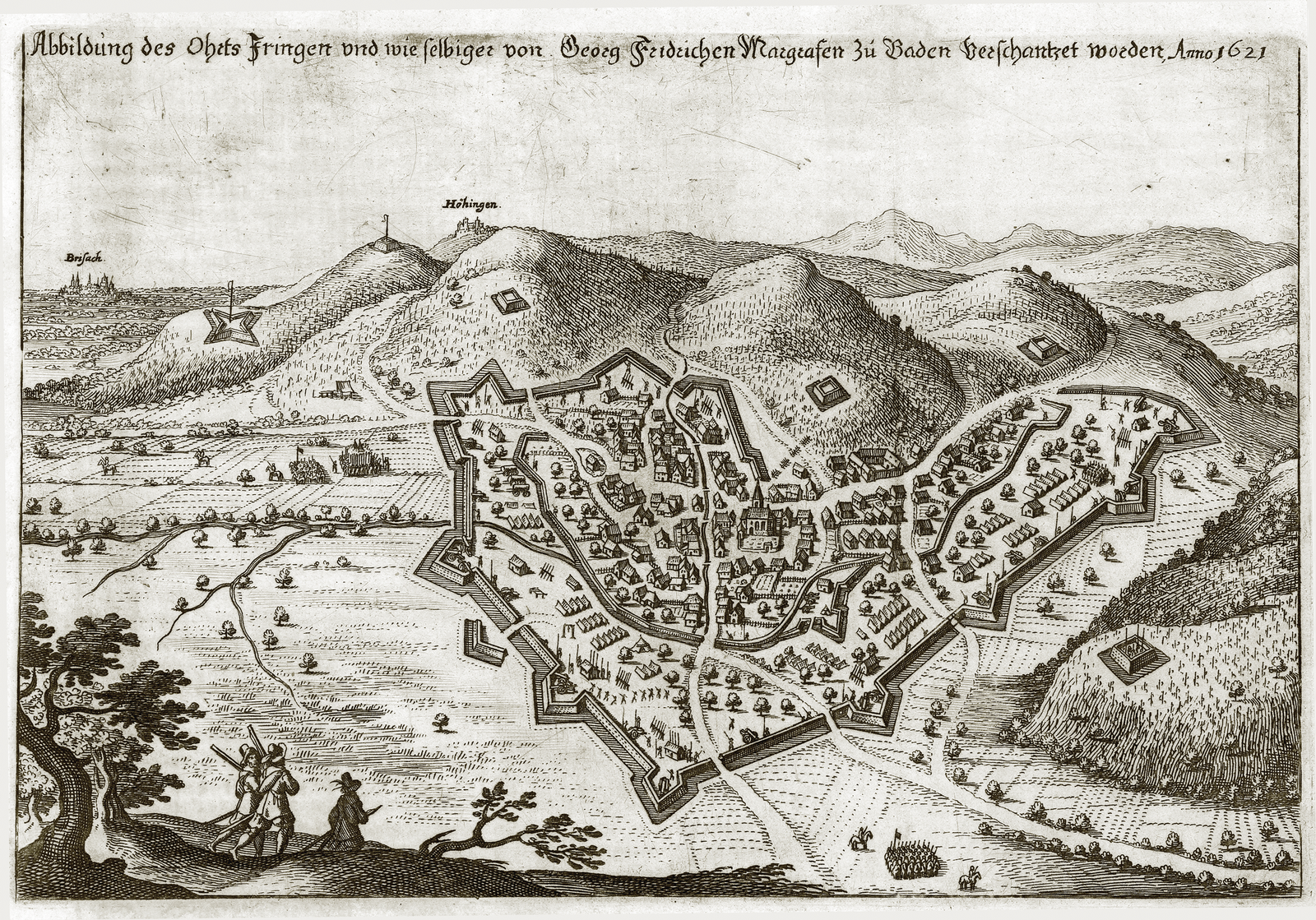
Fortified camp of Margrave George Frederick at Ihringen

From March to June 1620 George Frederick blocked the road from Breisach to Freiburg by order of the Protestant Union, operating from a fortified camp at Ihringen. The goal was to prevent the passage of mercenary troops of Bavaria and the Catholic League from the Alsace to their assembly points at Lauingen and Dillingen on the Danube. Nevertheless, after Emperor Ferdinand II gave assurances that certain troops had been recruited for himself and not for Bavarian/Catholic League army, George Frederick allowed the three regiments to pass and had to put up with being called naïve when these regiments joined the army of Duke Maximilian I of Bavaria.

=== Wimpfen campaign ===
In 1621, George Frederick began recruiting troops to campaign against the Catholic forces, which had begun a successful advance in 1620. In order not to lose his Margraviate to an imperial ban for waging war on the emperor, he abdicated in 1622, in favour of his son, Frederick V.

In the spring of 1622, after the Estates granted him a special war tax for three years, he had between 11000 and 12000 mercenaries at his disposal, with a relatively large amount of artillery, in addition to the regiment that would remain behind to defend Baden. On 24/25 April 1622, he began a campaign against the Emperor and his Catholic allies. However, he arrived too late to participate in the Battle of Mingolsheim on 27 April, where the Palatinate commander Count Ernst von Mansfeld crushingly defeated Lieutenant General Tilly of the Catholic League.

On 27 April, George Frederick declared war on the Habsburgs and combined his forces with those of Mansfeld, so as to fight the Catholic League together. When they were inexplicably separated a few days later, George Frederick came under attack from Tilly, who was assisted by Spanish troops under Córdoba. George Frederick was defeated in the Battle of Wimpfen on 6 May 1622. He was injured in the face and narrowly escaped to Stuttgart, where he abdicated in favour of his eldest son.

Already on 13 May 1622 George Frederick had returned to Durlach and tried in vain to raise a new army. A Catholic army of about 12000 troops invaded Baden and devastated it thoroughly. George Frederick initially fled to a stronghold at Emmendingen he had heavily fortified in the beginning of the century. On 26 August 1622, the Emperor invested William, the son of Edward Fortunatus, with Baden-Baden. This meant that Baden was once again split into a Catholic Baden-Baden and a Protestant Baden-Durlach. This split would last until Baden was reunited in 1771 under Margrave Charles Frederick.

=== Career after Wimpfen ===
In 1625, George Frederick retreated to Geneva, where he soon came into conflict with the Calvinist government, because he held Lutheran church services in his apartment. So in 1626 he moved to Thônes, where Duke Charles Emmanuel of Savoy allowed him to hold Lutheran church services.

In the summer of 1627 he was appointed lieutenant general of the Danish army by King Christian IV of Denmark, who was involved in the Danish-Lower Saxon War and tasked George Frederick with stopping the advance of Wallenstein into northern Germany. When Wallenstein approached, George Frederick withdrew to the island of Poel and then to Heiligenhafen in Holstein. His troops from there marched to Oldenburg in Holstein, where he was almost completely wiped out in the Battle at the Oldenburg Gulley by an imperial army under Heinrich Schlik and had to surrender on 24 September 1627. In October, George Frederick resigned from the Danish service, after a dispute with the Danish king, who wanted to bring the issue before a court martial.

=== Retirement and death ===
George Frederick retired to his home in Strasbourg and devoted himself mainly to the study of religious literature. He was, however, still in contact with France and Sweden, trying to realise his dream of a Lutheran Greater Baden. He died on 24 September 1638 in Strasbourg. His body was probably transferred to the princely crypt in the S. Michael Church in Pforzheim in 1650.

== Marriages and issue ==
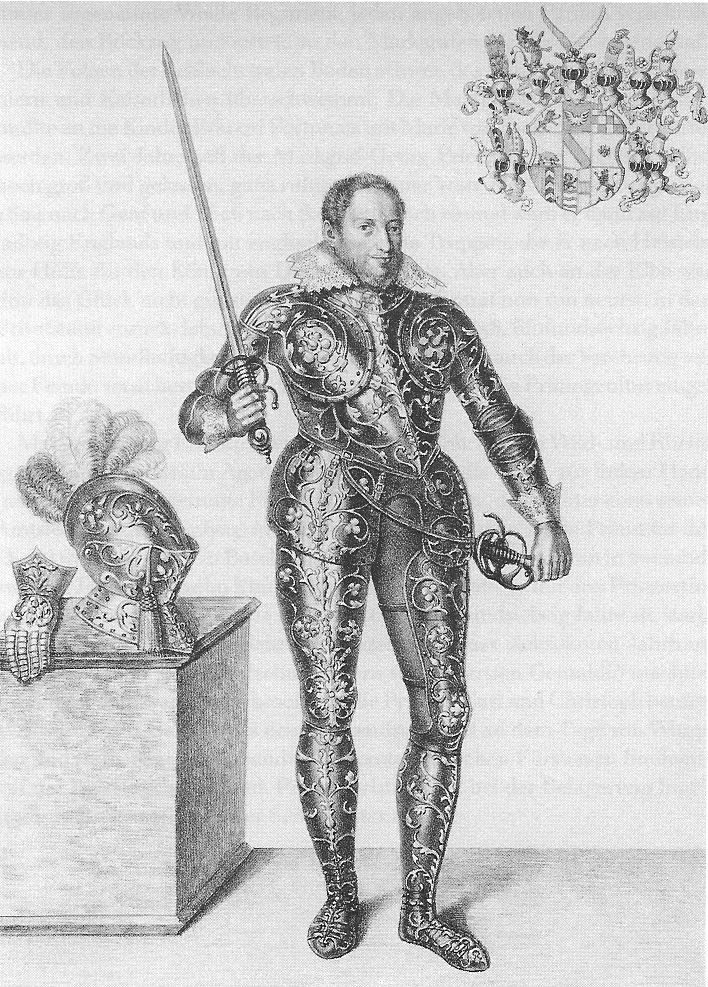
George Frederick of Baden

George Frederick married three times. His first marriage was to Juliane Ursula of Salm-Neufville (born 29 September 1572; died 30 April 1614), daughter of the Wild- and Rhinegrave Frederick of Salm-Neufville. This marriage took place on 2 July 1592 and produced fifteen children:

- Ursula Catherine (born 19 June 1593; died 15 February 1615), married on 24 August 1613 with Otto, Landgrave of Hesse-Kassel (born 25 December 1594; died 7 August 1617)
- Frederick (born 6 July 1594; died 8 September 1659), Margrave of Baden-Durlach from 1622 to 1659
- Anna Amalia (born 9 July 1595; died 18 November 1651), married on 25 November 1615 Count William Louis of Nassau-Saarbrücken (born 18 December 1590; died 22 August 1640)
- Philip (born:30 December 1596; died 14 March 1597)
- Charles (born 22 May 1598, died 27 July 1625)
- Juliane Ursula (born 1 January 1600; died 31 August 1600)
- Juliane Ursule Princess Of Baden (born January 1600; died 1621)
- Rudolph (born 21 January 1602; died 31 May 1603)
- Christopher (born 16 March 1603; died 30 April 1632 at the siege of Ingolstadt)
- Anna Auguste (born 30 March 1604; died 2 April 1616)
- Sibylle Magdalene (born 21 July 1605; died 22 July 1644), married on 6 June 1629 Count John of Nassau-Idstein (born 24 November 1603; died 23 June 1677)
- Francisca (born 9 August 1606; died 27 August 1606)
- Ursula Marie (born 3 November 1607; 22 December 1607)
- Francisca Sibylle (born 4 February 1609, died 2 March 1609)
- Sophie Dorothea (born 14 March 1610; died 24 October 1633)
- Ernestine Sophie (born 26 December 1612; died 4 July 1658)

Following Juliane's death, George Frederick married for a second time, to Agathe of Erbach-Breuberg (born 16 May 1581; died 30 April 1621), daughter of Count George III of Erbach on 23 October 1614. This marriage produced three children:

- Agathe (born 2 September 1615; died 29 June 1616)
- Anna Maria, artist and poet (born 29 May 1617; died 15 October 1672)
- Elizabeth, author of proverbs (born 5 February 1620; died 13 October 1692)

George Frederick's third marriage was morganatic. On 29 July 1621, he married Elisabeth Stolz the daughter of his secretary, Johann Thomas Stolz. This marriage remained childless.

== Ancestors ==
Ancestors of George Frederick, Margrave of Baden-Durlach

8. Christopher I, Margrave of Baden
4. Ernest, Margrave of Baden-Durlach
9. Ottilie of Katzenelnbogen
2. Charles II, Margrave of Baden-Durlach
10. Wolf of Rosenfeld
5. Ursula of Rosenfeld
11. Anna Bombast of Hohenheim
1. George Frederick, Margrave of Baden-Durlach
12. Alexander, Count Palatine of Zweibrücken
6. Rupert, Count Palatine of Veldenz
13. Margarete of Hohenlohe-Neuenstein
3. Anna of Veldenz
14. John VII, Wild- and Rhinegrave of Salm-Kyrburg
7. Ursula of Salm-Kyrburg
15. Anna of Isenburg-Büdingen

== Footnotes ==
George Frederick, Margrave of Baden-Durlach House of Zähringen Born: 30 January 1573 Died: 24 September 1638
Preceded by Ernest Frederick	Margrave of Baden-Durlach; 1604–1622	Succeeded by Frederick V
