= Countess Palatine Anna of Veldenz =

Margravine of Baden (1540–1586)

Anna of Veldenz
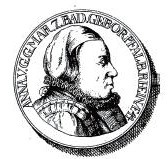
- Anna of Veldenz - Margravine of Baden-Durlach
- Born: 12 November 1540
- Died: 30 March 1586 (aged 45); Graben
- Noble family: House of Wittelsbach
- Spouse: Charles II, Margrave of Baden-Durlach
- Issue Detail: Ernest Frederick; James; George Frederick
- Father: Rupert, Count Palatine of Veldenz
- Mother: Ursula of Salm-Kyrburg

Countess Palatine Anna of Veldenz (12 November 1540 – 30 March 1586) was Margravine of Baden-Durlach by marriage to Charles II, Margrave of Baden-Durlach, and co-regent of the Margraviate of Baden-Durlach during the minority of her son Ernest Frederick from 1577 to 1584.

== Life ==
Anna was the eldest child of the Count Palatine Rupert of Veldenz (1506–1544) from his marriage to Ursula (1515–1601), daughter of Wild- and Rhinegrave John VII of Salm-Kyrburg.

She married Charles II, Margrave of Baden-Durlach on the first of August 1558 in Heidelberg; it was his second marriage. Like her husband, Anna held a Lutheran faith and the children from both his marriages were also raised as Lutherans.

=== Regency ===
When her husband died, his sons were still minors. Therefore, she acted as guardian and regent from 1577 until her son Ernest Frederick came of age in 1584. Her co-regents were Elector Palatine Louis VI and Duke Louis "the Pious" of Württemberg. In 1584, Baden-Durlach was split: her eldest son Ernest Frederick, received the largest part and became Margrave of Baden-Durlach. Her second son James received Baden-Hachberg and had his residence at Emmendingen. He converted to Catholicism in 1590 and reverted his territory to the Catholic faith. However, a short while later, he died of arsenic poisoning and Baden-Hachberg fell to his brother Ernest Frederick.

When Ernest Frederick died in 1604, all parts of Baden were reunited under his brother George Frederick.

Margravine Anna's young chaplain John Zehender was responsible for her pastoral care in the last years of her life and gave an impressive funeral sermon on 5 April 1586.

== Issue ==
From her marriage Anna had the following children:

- Dorothea Ursula (1559–1583)

married in 1575 with Duke Louis of Württemberg (1554–1593)

- Ernest Frederick (1560–1604), Margrave of Baden-Durlach

married in 1585 Princess Anna of East Frisia (1562–1621)

- James (1562–1590), Margrave of Baden-Hachberg

married in 1584 with Countess Elizabeth of Culemborg-Pallandt (1567–1620)

- Anna Marie (1565–1573)
- Elizabeth (1570–1611)
- George Frederick (1573–1638), Margrave of Baden-Durlach

married firstly, in 1592, Wild- and Rhinegravine Juliane Ursula of Salm-Neufville (1572–1614)
married secondly, in 1614, Countess Agathe of Erbach (1581–1621)
married thirdly, in 1621, in a morganatic marriage, Elizabeth Stotz (d. 1652)

== Ancestors ==
Ancestors of Countess Palatine Anna of Veldenz

8. Louis I, Count Palatine of Zweibrücken
4. Alexander, Count Palatine of Zweibrücken
9. Johanna of Croÿ
2. Rupert, Count Palatine of Veldenz
10. Kraft VI, Count of Hohenlohe-Weikersheim
5. Margarete of Hohenlohe-Neuenstein
11. Helen of Württemberg
1. Anna of Veldenz
12. John VI, Wild- and Rhinegrave of Dhaun-Kyrburg
6. John VII, Wild- and Rhinegrave of Dhaun-Kyrburg
13. Joanna of Moers-Saarwerden
3. Ursula of Salm-Kyrburg
14. Philip, Count of Isenburg-Ronneburg
7. Amma of Isenburg-Büdingen
15. Amalia of Rieneck

Countess Palatine Anna of Veldenz House of Wittelsbach Born: 12 November 1540 Died: 30 March 1586
Preceded by Charles II	Regent of the Magraviate of Baden-Durlach; 1577–1584	Succeeded by Ernest Frederick
