= Ernest Frederick, Margrave of Baden-Durlach =

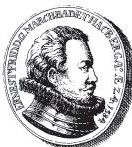
- Margrave Ernest Frederick of Baden-Durlach - copper engraving of a coin
- Born: 17 October 1560; Durlach
- Died: 14 April 1604 (aged 43); Remchingen
- Noble family: House of Zähringen
- Spouse: Anna of East Frisia
- Father: Charles II, Margrave of Baden-Durlach
- Mother: Anna of Veldenz

Ernest Frederick of Baden-Durlach (born 17 October 1560 in Durlach – died 14 April 1604 in Remchingen) ruled the northern part of the Margraviate of Baden-Durlach. He came to power when he came of age in 1584. He founded the first gymnasium illustre in the margraviate. Ernst Friedrich, who had a strict Lutheran upbringing, started a reconciliation between Lutheranism and Calvinism with the publication of the Staffort Book in 1599. His occupation of Upper Baden caused serious conflicts – even with the Emperor – the consequences of which damaged Lower Baden and ultimately also led to losses of territory.

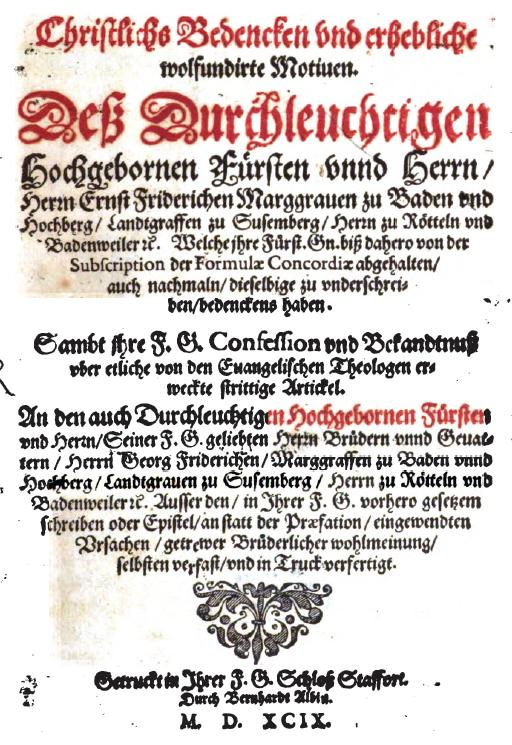
Title page of the Staffort Book of 1599

== Life ==
Ernest Frederick was the eldest son of the Margrave Charles II of Baden-Durlach and Anna of Veldenz. From 1577 onwards, he received his education at the court of his guardian, the Lutheran Duke Louis III of Württemberg.

=== The regency 1577–1584 ===
After his father's death, a regency council was formed, consisting of his mother Anna, Elector Palatine Louis VI, Elector Palatine (until 1583), Duke Philip Louis of Neuburg and Duke Louis "the Pious" of Württemberg. The council ruled Margraviate of Baden-Durlach on his behalf when he inherited it as a minor.

=== The division of territories ===
Ernest Frederick and Charles II's second oldest son, James, both wanted to own dominions. Charles II's last will and testament forbade that, but it had not been signed and sealed, so the remaining guardians decided to give them their way and divide the country. Ernest Frederick received Lower Baden, including the large towns of Durlach and Pforzheim.

His younger brothers James and George Frederick also received parts of the country, so that the land was further divided beyond the existing division into Baden-Durlach, Baden-Baden. The Margraviate of Baden-Hachberg fell back to Ernest Frederick in 1590 after James's death. His youngest brother George Frederick was able to reunite the whole Margraviate of Baden-Durlach after's Ernest Frederick's death.

=== Marriage ===
Margrave Ernest Frederick married on 21 December 1585 Anna of East Frisia (26 June 1562 – 21 April 1621), the daughter of Count Edzard II of East Frisia and widow of his guardian. The marriage produced no children.

== Ancestors ==
Ancestors of Ernest Frederick, Margrave of Baden-Durlach

8. Christopher I, Margrave of Baden
4. Ernest, Margrave of Baden-Durlach
9. Ottilie of Katzenelnbogen
2. Charles II, Margrave of Baden-Durlach
10. Wolf of Rosenfeld
5. Ursula of Rosenfeld
11. Anna Bombast of Hohenheim
1. Ernest Frederick, Margrave of Baden-Durlach
12. Alexander, Count Palatine of Zweibrücken
6. Rupert, Count Palatine of Veldenz
13. Margarete of Hohenlohe-Neuenstein
3. Anna of Veldenz
14. John VII, Wild- and Rhinegrave of Salm-Kyrburg
7. Ursula of Salm-Kyrburg
15. Anna of Isenburg-Büdingen

== Literature ==
- Ernst Albrecht: Leben und Tod des Markgrafen Ernst Friedrich von Baden-Durlach (1560–1604) in zeitgenössischen Dokumenten. In: Udo Wennemuth (Hrsg.): Reformierte Spuren in Baden (= Veröffentlichungen des Vereins für Kirchengeschichte in der Evangelischen Landeskirche in Baden. 57). Evang. Presseverb. für Baden, Karlsruhe 2001, ISBN 3-87210-912-X, S. 68–86.
- Werner Baumann: Ernst Friedrich von Baden-Durlach. Die Bedeutung der Religion für Leben und Politik eines süddeutschen Fürsten im Zeitalter der Gegenreformation, W. Kohlhammer Verlag Stuttgart, 1962. (Veröffentlichungen der Kommission für geschichtliche Landeskunde in Baden-Württemberg, Reihe B, Forschungen, 20. Band)

== Footnotes ==
Ernest Frederick, Margrave of Baden-Durlach House of Zähringen Born: 17 October 1560 Died: 14 April 1604
Preceded by Anna of Veldenz as Regent	Margrave of Baden-Durlach; 1584–1604	Succeeded by George Frederick
