= Wolfgang, Count Palatine of Zweibrücken =

Count (1526–1569)

Wolfgang
- Count Palatine of Zweibrücken
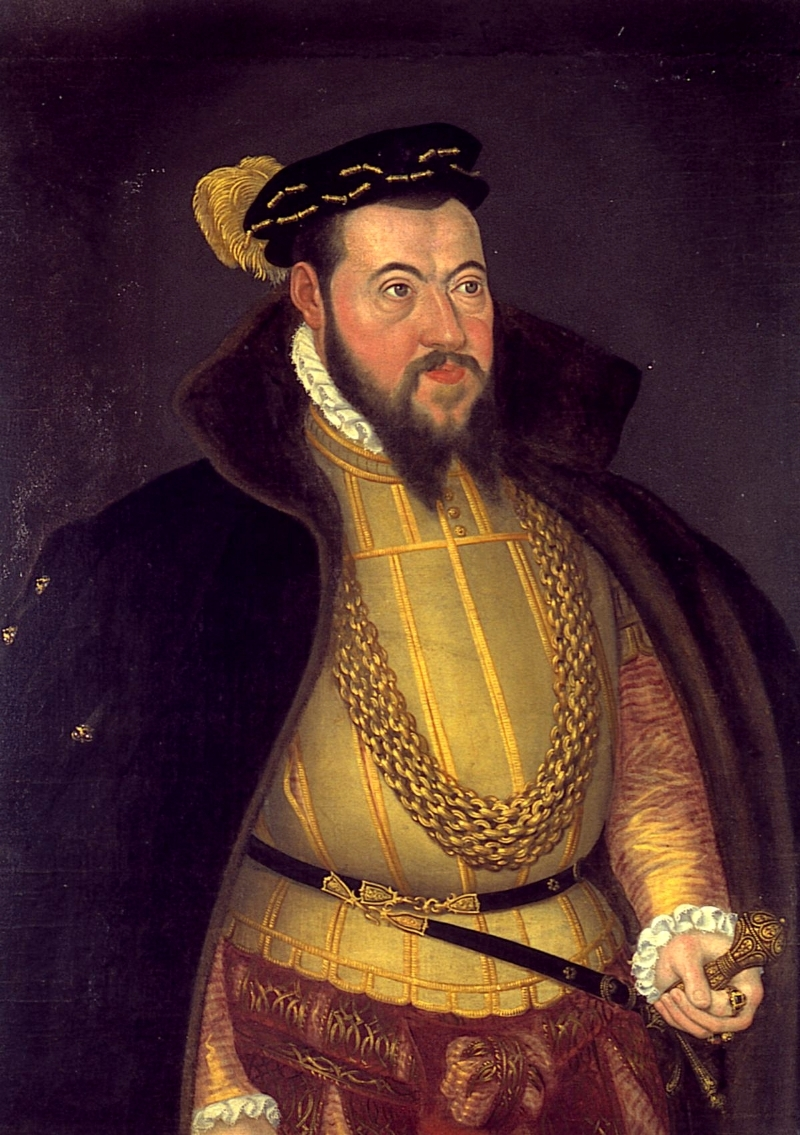
- Portrait by unknown, 16th century
- Born: 26 September 1526; Zweibrücken
- Died: 11 June 1569 (aged 42); Nexon, Haute-Vienne
- Burial: Meisenheim
- Spouse: Anna of Hesse (m. 1544)
- Issue Detail: Countess Palatine Christine; Philip Louis, Count Palatine of Neuburg; John I, Count Palatine of Zweibrücken; Countess Palatine Anna; Countess Palatine Elisabeth; Otto Henry, Count Palatine of Sulzbach; Frederick, Count Palatine of Zweibrücken-Vohenstrauss-Parkstein; Barbara, Countess of Oettingen-Oettingen; Charles I, Count Palatine of Zweibrücken-Birkenfeld; Maria Elisabeth, Countess of Leiningen-Dagsburg-Hardenburg
- House: Wittelsbach
- Father: Louis II, Count Palatine of Zweibrücken
- Mother: Elisabeth of Hesse

Count Palatine Wolfgang of Zweibrücken (German: Pfalzgraf Wolfgang von Zweibrücken; 26 September 1526 – 11 June 1569) was member of the Wittelsbach family of the Counts Palatine and Duke of Zweibrücken from 1532. With the support of his regent, his uncle Rupert (later made the Count of Veldenz), Wolfgang introduced the Reformation to Zweibrücken in 1537.

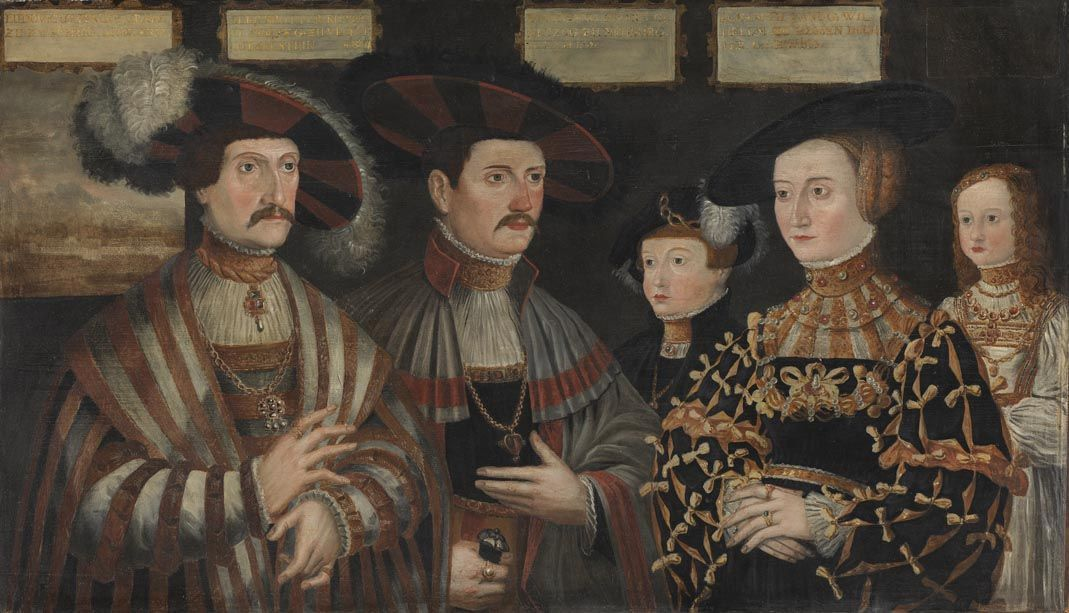
Louis II with his brother Rupert, wife Elisabeth and children (incl. Wolfgang), by Peter Gertner

== Biography ==
He was the only son of Louis II, Count Palatine of Zweibrücken and his wife Elisabeth of Hesse, daughter of William I, Landgrave of Hesse. His father died in 1532, so the regency of Palatinate-Zweibrücken passed to Louis' younger brother Rupert until 1543. In 1557 Wolfgang received the territory of Palatinate-Neuburg in accordance with the Contract of Heidelberg. In 1548 the Holy Roman Emperor Charles V occupied his Protestant territories and reintroduced Catholic practices. Wolfgang regained his territories in 1552. Despite the Peace of Augsburg of 1555 several ecclesiastical states in Germany were secularised in 1557, a few of which Wolfgang obtained. In 1566 he served as a cavalry officer in the Turkish Wars.

In 1569 he came to the aid of French Huguenots with 14,000 mercenaries during the Third of the French Wars of Religion (his intervention was financed in part by Queen Elizabeth I of England). He invaded Burgundy, but was killed in the conflict.

He was buried in Meisenheim.

== Succession ==
When the young Wolfgang's father died, his uncle Rupert had served as the child's regent. In 1543, when Wolfgang reached majority and took on the responsibility of office, he enacted the Marburg Contract, giving Rupert the County of Veldenz.

After his death, Wolfgang's remaining land was split among his five sons who then created three branches: Philip Louis (House of Palatinate-Neuburg), John (House of Palatinate-Zweibrücken) and Charles (House of Palatinate-Birkenfeld). Otto Henry and Frederick had no surviving sons.

The House of Palatinate-Neuburg inherited the Electorate of the Palatinate in 1685 and by its cadet branch Palatinate-Sulzbach also Bavaria in 1777. The House of Palatinate-Birkenfeld then inherited the Electorate of the Palatinate and Bavaria in 1799. The House of Palatinate-Zweibrücken contributed to the monarchy in Sweden from 1654 onwards through its cadet branch Palatinate-Zweibrücken-Kleeburg.

== Family and children ==
He was married in 1545 to Anna of Hesse, daughter of Philip I, Landgrave of Hesse. They had the following children:

- Countess Palatine Christine (1546 – 1619).
- Philipp Ludwig of Pfalz-Neuburg (1547–1614), married Anna of Cleves (1552–1632), daughter of William, Duke of Jülich-Cleves-Berg. Their grandson was Philip William, Elector Palatine.
- John I, Count Palatine of Zweibrücken (1550–1604), married his sister-in-law Magdalene (1553–1633), daughter of William, Duke of Jülich-Cleves-Berg. Their grandson was Charles X Gustav of Sweden.
- Countess Palatine Dorothea Agnes (1551–1552).
- Countess Palatine Elisabeth (1553–1554).
- Countess Palatine Anna (1554–1576).
- Countess Palatine Elisabeth (1555–1625).
- Otto Henry, Count Palatine of Sulzbach (1556–1604), married Dorothea Maria of Württemberg.
- Frederick, Count Palatine of Zweibrücken-Vohenstrauss-Parkstein (1557–1597), married Katharina Sophie of Legnica.
- Countess Palatine Barbara (1559 – 1618), married on 7 November 1591 Gottfried, Count of Oettingen-Oettingen.
- Charles I, Count Palatine of Zweibrücken-Birkenfeld (1560–1600), married Dorothea of Brunswick-Lüneburg and became ancestor to the line of Palatinate-Zweibrücken-Birkenfeld and the Dukes in Bavaria and later Kings of Bavaria.
- Countess Palatine Maria Elisabeth (1561–1629), married in 1585 Emich XII, Count of Leiningen-Dagsburg-Hardenburg.
- Countess Palatine Susanna (1564–1565).

== Ancestors ==
Ancestors of Wolfgang, Count Palatine of Zweibrücken

16. Stephen, Count Palatine of Simmern-Zweibrücken
8. Louis I, Count Palatine of Zweibrücken
17. Anna of Veldenz, Countess Palatine of Simmern-Zweibrücken
4. Alexander, Count Palatine of Zweibrücken
18. Antoine I de Croÿ, Count of Porcéan
9. Johanna of Croÿ
19. Margaret of Lorraine-Vaudémont
2. Louis II, Count Palatine of Zweibrücken
20. Kraft V, Count of Hohenlohe-Weikersheim
10. Kraft VI, Count of Hohenlohe-Weikersheim
21. Margaret of Oettingen
5. Margarete of Hohenlohe-Neuenstein
22. Ulrich V, Count of Württemberg
11. Helene of Württemberg
23. Margaret of Savoy, Duchess of Anjou
1. Wolfgang, Count Palatine of Zweibrücken
24. Louis I, Landgrave of Hesse
12. Louis II, Landgrave of Lower Hesse
25. Anna of Saxony, Landgravine of Hesse
6. William I, Landgrave of Lower Hesse
26. Ludwig I, Count of Württemberg-Urach
13. Mechthild of Württemberg-Urach
27. Mechthild of Germany
3. Elisabeth of Hesse
28. William the Victorious, Duke of Brunswick-Lüneburg
14. William IV, Duke of Brunswick-Lüneburg
29. Cecilia of Brandenburg
7. Anna of Brunswick
30. Bodo VII, Count of Stolberg-Wernigerode
15. Elizabeth of Stolberg-Wernigerode
31. Anna of Schwarzburg

Wolfgang, Count Palatine of Zweibrücken House of Wittelsbach Born: 1526 Died: 1569
German royalty
Regnal titles
Preceded by Otto Henry	Count Palatine of Neuburg; 1557–1569	Succeeded by Philipp Louis
Preceded by Louis II	Count Palatine of Veldenz; 1532–1543	Succeeded by Rupert
Preceded by Louis II	Duke of Zweibrücken; 1532–1569	Succeeded by John I
Preceded by Louis II	Count Palatine of Sulzbach; 1532–1569	Succeeded by Otto Henry
Preceded by Louis II	Count Palatine of Zweibrücken-Vohenstrauss-Parkstein; 1532–1569	Succeeded by Frederick
Preceded by Louis II	Count Palatine of Zweibrücken-Birkenfeld; 1532–1569	Succeeded by Charles I
