= James III of Baden-Hachberg =

Margrave of Baden-Hachberg

James III, Margrave of Baden-Hachberg
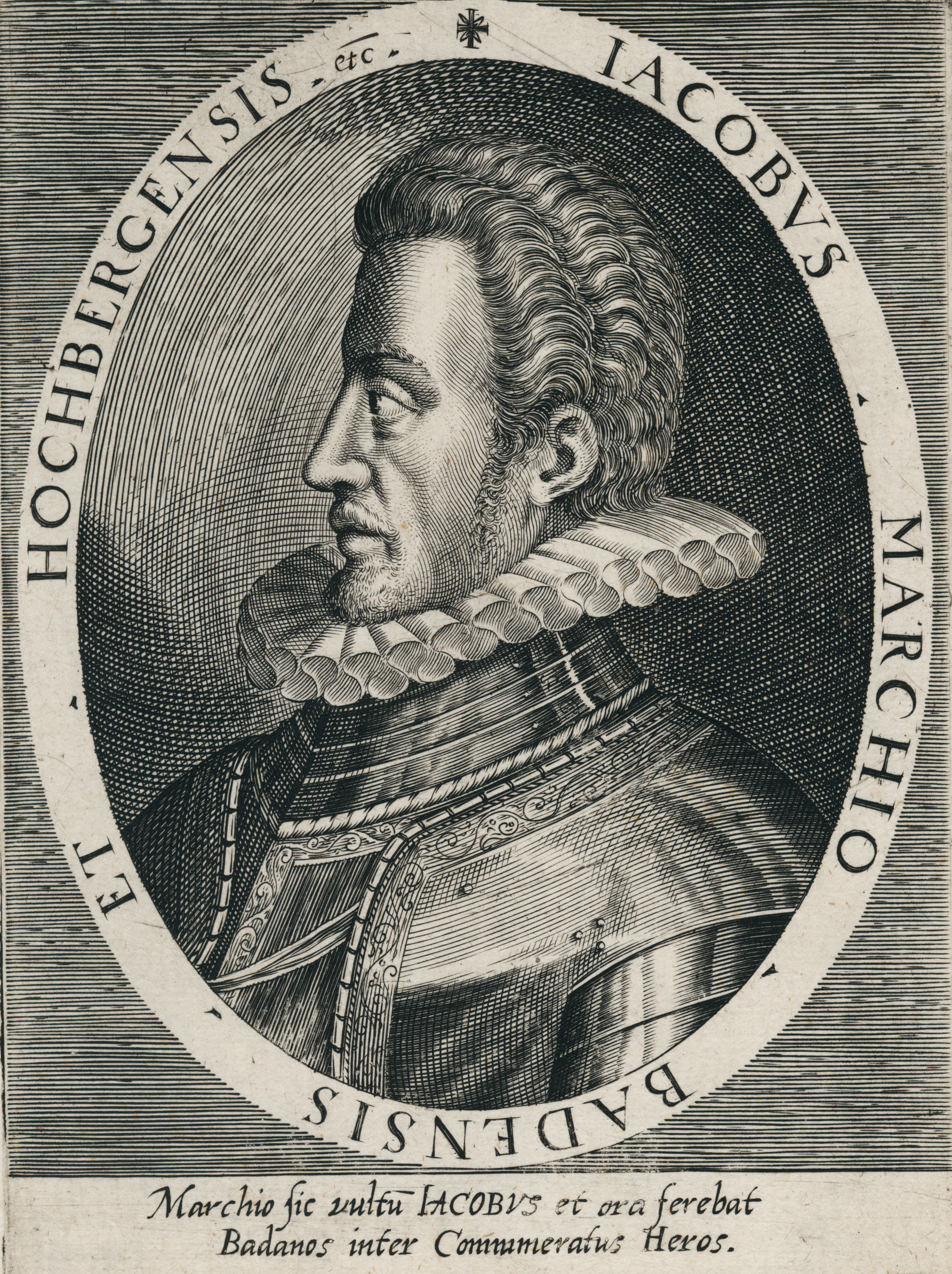
- James III, Margrave of Baden-Hachberg
- Born: 26 May 1562
- Died: 17 August 1590 (aged 28)
- Buried: St. Michael church in Pforzheim
- Noble family: House of Zähringen
- Spouse: Elisabeth of Culemborg-Pallandt
- Father: Charles II, Margrave of Baden-Durlach
- Mother: Anna of Veldenz

Margrave James III of Baden-Hachberg (26 May 1562 – 17 August 1590) was margrave of Baden-Hachberg from 1584 to 1590 and resided at Emmendingen. He converted, in 1590, from Lutheranism to the Roman Catholic confession, causing some political turmoil.

== Life ==
James was the second son of Margrave Charles II of Baden-Durlach and Anna of Veldenz, daughter of the Count Palatine Rupert of Veldenz. From 1557, James and his brother Ernest Frederick were educated at the court of their guardian, the Lutheran Duke Louis III "the Pious" of Württemberg. James was very interested in recent developments in science and studied in Tübingen and Strasbourg. He then made a Grand Tour to Italy and France.

=== Regency, 1577-1584 ===
When his father died in 1577, James was a minor when he inherited the Margraviate of Baden-Hachberg. Thus, the margraviate was taken up by a regency council, consisting of his mother, Anna of Veldenz, Elector Palatine Louis VI (until 1583), Count Palatine Philip Louis of Neuburg and Duke Louis III "the Pious" of Württemberg.

=== Division of the territory ===
James and his eldest brother Ernest Frederick wanted to be sovereign rulers of their own fragment of Baden. Their father's last will and testament forbade a further division of the margraviate. However, the testament had not been properly signed and sealed. According to the three remaining regents, this invalidated the testament, so they allowed a division, thereby fragmenting Baden beyond the existing division into Baden-Baden and Baden-Durlach. James received the Lordship of Hachberg, with its seat in Emmendingen. Ernest Frederick received Lower Baden, including the two largest cities, Durlach and Pforzheim. Their youngest brother George Frederick received Upper Baden, including the Lordships of Rötteln and Badenweiler and the Margraviate of Baden-Sausenburg.

When James's heir died in 1591, Baden-Hachberg fell to Ernest Frederick. When Ernest Frederick died without a male heir in 1604, his possessions also fell to George Frederick, thereby reuniting Baden-Durlach.

== The conversion ==
The three brothers followed different paths in their religious development. All three were raised in the Lutheran faith. George Frederick converted to Calvinism, while James adopted Catholicism, and Ernest Frederick remained a Lutheran.

In 1582, the conversion of Gebhard Truchsess von Waldburg, the Archbishop of Cologne to Lutheranism led to a war between Gebhard, who refused to give up his Archdiocese and Duke Ernest of Bavaria, who had been elected as his successor. Gebhard tried to convert the archdiocese to Lutheranism and allied himself with the beautiful Countess Agnes von Mansfeld-Eisleben. James fought in this war under the Spanish general Alexander Farnese, Duke of Parma. He later served under the Catholic Duke Charles III of Lorraine.

In 1582, at the age of 22, Margrave James III of Baden married the 16-year-old Countess Elisabeth of Culemborg-Pallandt. She was the sole heiress to a very large fortune. Their marriage was a happy one and produced four children. However, it lasted only six years. In 1588, the couple moved from the Hochburg to the smaller Emendingen Castle. On 1 January 1590, James III gave city rights to the market town of Emmendingen.

During this period of deep religious division, the Margrave closely watched the three Christian camps: the Catholics, Lutherans and Calvinists. In 1589 and 1590, he commissioned two colloquia, the first in Baden-Baden, the second in Emmendingen, between Lutheran theologicians from Württemberg and Catholics. In Emmendingen, the Lutheran side was led by Johannes Pappus from Strasbourg, and the Catholic side by James's court chaplain Johannes Zehender. Afterwards, James converted, like his lead councillor Johann Pistorius had done two years earlier, in the Cistercian monastery Tennenbach on 15 July 1590 to the Roman Catholic faith. This caused a huge stir in Germany, as he was the first reigning Protestant prince in Germany to convert after the 1555 Peace of Augsburg. Under the cuius regio, eius religio rule in that treaty, Catholicism was made the state religion of the Margraviate of Baden-Hachberg on 10 August 1590. Pope Sixtus V had high hopes for the Margrave.

== Death ==
However, only a week later, the healthy, 28-year-old Margrave James III died unexpectedly. His body was dissected by two professors of the Medical Faculty of Freiburg — a very rare procedure in the 16th Century. The precise Latin language of the autopsy report states that the cause of death was poisoning by arsenic (As_{2}O_{3}). James's will stated that he wished to be buried in Baden-Baden, which was Catholic at the time. He was, however, buried in the St. Michael church in Pforzheim. The inscription on his grave does not mention his conversion to Catholicism.

A week after James's death, his widow, Elisabeth of Culemborg-Pallandt, gave birth to a posthumous son and heir Ernest James. Ernest Frederick illegally took the baby in his care. The baby died after less than nine months, on 29 May 1591. Baden-Hachberg fell to Ernest Frederick, who converted it back to Lutheranism. Elisabeth of Culemborg-Pallandt converted to Catholicism after her husband died and remarried with Charles II, Count of Hohenzollern-Sigmaringen. Ernest Frederick then refused to give her the widow seat in Emmendingen, to which she was entitled under James's testament.

The events surrounding James III's death illustrate the increasing polarization in religious matters. The tensions between the faiths had risen very high, and the hunger for power of the German rulers and princelings was very strong. In less than 30 years, these tensions would be discharged in a terrible manner during the Thirty Years' War.

== Marriage and issue ==
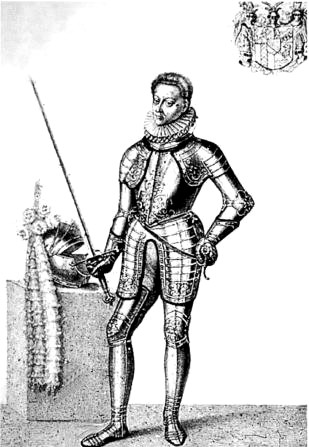
Margrave James III of Baden and Hachberg

James married on 6 September 1584 with Elisabeth of Culemborg-Pallandt (born: 1567; died: 8 May 1620), the daughter of Count Floris I of Pallandt-Culemborg (1537–1598 ). They had four children:

- Anna (born: 13 June 1585; died: 11 March 1649), married in 1607 with Count Wolrad IV of Waldeck-Eisenberg (born: 7 July 1588; died: 6 October 1640)
- Charles Ernest (born: 21 June 1588; died: 19 September 1588)
- Jakobea (born; 2 June 1589; died: 29 September 1625)
- Ernest James (born: 24 August 1590; died: 29 May 1591)

== Footnotes ==
James III of Baden-Hachberg House of Zähringen Born: 26 May 1562 Died: 17 August 1590
New division	Margrave of Baden-Hachberg; 1584–1590	Succeeded by Ernest Frederick as Margrave of Baden-Durlach
