= Charles II of Baden-Durlach =

Margrave (1529–1577)

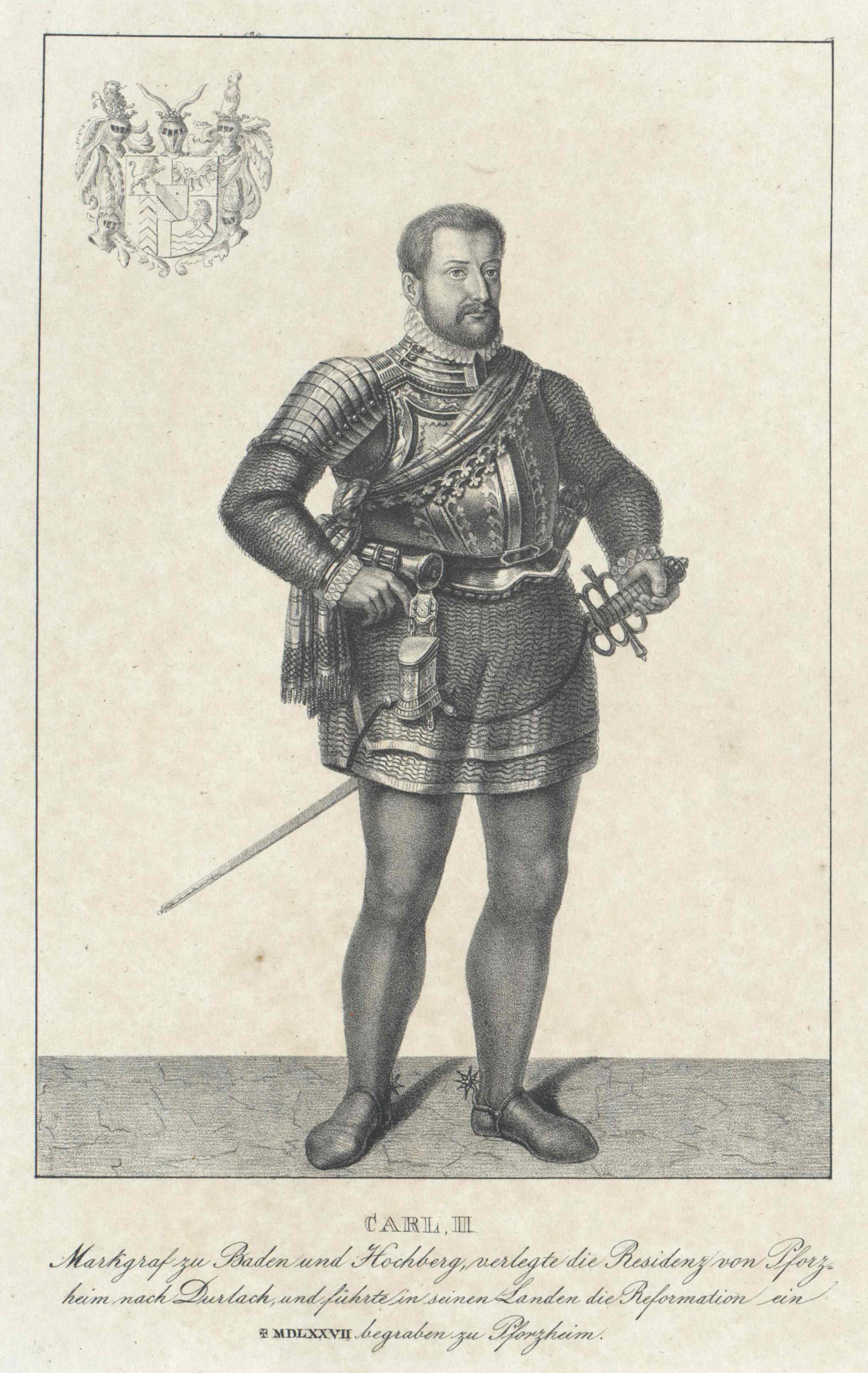
- Charles II, Margrave of Baden-Durlach
- Born: 24 July 1529; Pforzheim
- Died: 23 March 1577 (aged 47); Durlach
- Noble family: House of Zähringen
- Spouses: Kunigunde of Brandenburg-Kulmbach; Countess Palatine Anna of Veldenz
- Issue Detail: Ernest Frederick; James; George Frederick
- Father: Ernest, Margrave of Baden-Durlach
- Mother: Ursula of Rosenfeld

Charles II of Baden-Durlach (24 July 1529 in Pforzheim – 23 March 1577 in Durlach), nicknamed Charles with the bag, governed the Margravate of Baden-Durlach from 1552 to 1577. On 1 June 1556, he issued a new Church Order, which made Lutheranism the official religion in Baden-Durlach.

== Life ==
Charles was the son of Margrave Ernest of Baden-Durlach and his second wife Ursula of Rosenfeld. Since the marriage between Ernest and Ursula was morganatic, Charles's ability to succeed was disputed. Nevertheless, he started ruling Upper Baden in his father's name in September 1552. His half-brother, older by 12 years, Bernard IV, died on 20 January 1553 and his father died two weeks later, on 6 February. Charles then inherited the entire country, which was called Baden-Pforzheim at the time. He moved the capital to Durlach, thereby changing the name of his country to Baden-Durlach.

=== The introduction of the Reformation in 1556 ===
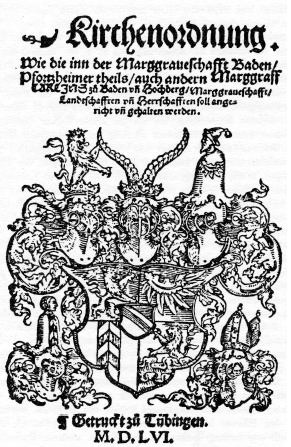
Cover of the Church Order of 1556

After the Peace of Passau (1552) a number of secular rulers in the south west of Germany introduced the Reformation. Margrave Ernest of Baden-Durlach had plans to have had follow suit, but still faced a potential conflict with Archduke Ferdinand, the ruler of the Roman Catholic Further Austria, who still claimed parts of Upper Baden.

Margrave Charles II – like his cousin, Margrave Philibert of Baden-Baden – supported the Peace of Augsburg of 1555 in the Reichstag, which gave secular imperial princes freedom to introduce Lutheranism in their territories. With this protection and at the urging of Duke Christopher of Württemberg, Charles II introduced the Reformation into the margraviate of Baden-Durlach with the adoption of a new Church Order on 1 June 1556.

The preparation of the Reformation and the drafting of church order was entrusted to a Commission chaired by Martin Achtsynit, the Chancellor of the Margraviate of Baden (Pforzheimer part). Members of the Commission were the theologian Jacob Andreae from Tübingen, the court preacher Michael Diller from Heidelberg and the Saxon theologians Max Morlin and John Stossel. In addition to the theologians, the Councillors Johann Georg and Renz Sechele also belonged to the Commission. Achtsynit was also the first director of the Council of Churches; Charles himself was bishop of the Evangelical Church and so became successor to the bishops of Strasbourg, Speyer and Constance, who had been competent for different parts of his territory. The "inner conflict within the Protestant confession" also affected the work of the Commission. In the end, the commission chose, for political reasons, to largely copy the church order of Württemberg, which had been drafted by Johannes Brenz in 1553, with final editing by Jacob Heerbrand. Württemberg also allowed Jacob Heerbrand to participate in the first church visitation in Baden-Durlach, which was conducted in the autumn of 1556. Charles appointed the theologians Simon Sulzer from Basel as General Superintendent for Upper Baden.

Frequent visitations should ensure that only Lutheran pastors were active and the church order was complied with. Many Catholic priests were expelled. Ferdinand of Austria formally denied Charles the right to introduce the Reformation in his possessions in Breisgau. The people gave Charles the nickname the Pious, referring to the zeal he developed while introducing the Reformation.

As a result, the Ernestine part of Baden turned Protestant shortly after Baden was split. When the two parts of the Margraviate were reunited in 1771 under Margrave Charles Frederick, he had the foresight and sovereignty to allow multiple faiths and to call for tolerance and acceptance.

In 1561, the Margrave avowed to the unchanged Augsburg Confession at a convention of Protestants in Naumburg, convened by Elector Augustus of Saxony. Like his cousin Philibert of Baden-Baden, Charles supported King Charles IX of France by sending auxiliary troops into the war against the Calvinist Huguenots.

=== The prelate controversy ===
The Reformation had the effect that the territory of the Margrave of Baden-Durlach only Lutheran pastors were permitted. The Jus patronatus was, however, in many case owned by Catholic monasteries or religious orders, which would now have to pay for a Lutheran pastor. This, of course, caused resistance. The Peace of Augsburg had clear rules for this kind of situation. Religious institutions were allowed to keep their possessions in Protestant areas, but they indeed had to pay for the evangelical pastor. Based on the territorial claims of the House of Habsburg on the Upper Baden lordships mentioned above, the prelates held that the maintenance obligation did not apply to them, and the intended to keep the tithes. Charles then seized their estates and used them to fund the maintenance of churches and pastors. Johann Ulrich Zasius mediated and reached a compromise: the confiscated estates were returned to their owners, but Baden-Durlach was allowed to retain the funds necessary to pay the pastors. However, the Austrian authorities in Innsbruck did not accept this compromise and the confrontation escalated. After some prelates made separate agreements with Baden-Durlach, the negotiations were resumed and led to the treaty of Neuenburg am Rhein of 24 April 1561, with essentially the same result as the earlier agreement.

=== The relocation of the residence to Durlach in 1565 ===
The Margrave moved the residence from Liebeneck Castle in Pforzheim to Durlach in 1565. This was allegedly triggered by a dispute with the citizens of Pforzheim, who refused to act as drivers in a drive hunt organized by the Margrave. The literature points out that other, more rational, reasons may have existed; in particular, Durlach was more centrally located within Lower Baden.

For this move, the Karlsburg, an existing hunting lodge in Durlach, was expanded into a castle. Charles oversaw the expansion himself and paid the workers personally, using a shoulder bag full of money he brought with him. The affectionate nickname Charles with the Bag refers to this practice.

The city of Durlach was also renovated. A garden was added to the castle and several gates were added to the city wall. In 1571, a mint was built, as was usual in princely residences at the time.

== Marriages and issue ==
Charles II first married on 10 March 1551 with Kunigunde of Brandenburg-Kulmbach (born: 17 June 1523; died: 27 February 1558), the daughter of the Margrave Casimir of Brandenburg-Kulmbach. They had two children:

- Marie (born: 3 January 1553; died: 11 November 1561)
- Albert (born: 12 June 1555; died: 5 May 1574)

Charles II then married on 1 August 1558 Countess Palatine Anna of Veldenz (born: 12 November 1540, died: 30 March 1586), the daughter of the Count Palatine Rupert of Veldenz. They had the following children:

- Dorothea Ursula (born: 20 June 1559; died: 19 May 1583)

married on 7 November 1575 Louis III of Württemberg (born: 1 January 1554; died: 18 August 1593)

- Ernest Frederick (born: 17 October 1560; died: 14 April 1604)

married on 21 December 1585 Anna of East Frisia (born: 26 May 1562; died: 21 April 1621), the daughter of Count Edzard II of East Frisia

- James III (born: 26 May 1562; died: 17 August 1590)

married on 6 September 1584 Elisabeth of Pallandt-Culemborg (born c. 1567; died: 8 May 1620), the daughter of Count Floris I of Pallandt-Culemborg (1537–1598); reigning Margrave

- Anna Marie (born: 4 August 1565; died: 8 October 1573)
- Elizabeth (born: 27 September 1570; died: 6 October 1611)
- George Frederick born: 30 January 1573; died: 24 September 1638); reigning Margrave

After Charles II's death, Baden-Durlach was split-up between his three sons: Baden-Durlach-Hachberg went to James III; Baden-Durlach-Sausenberg went to George Frederick; the remaining Baden-Durlach went to Ernst Frederick who became Margrave of Baden-Durlach and was eventually succeeded by his brother George Frederick, who lived the longest of his sons. Only George Frederick remained a Lutheran, whereas Ernest Frederick converted to Calvinism and James III became a Catholic. Since George Frederick lived the longest, the margraviate remained Lutheran. Charles II's widow, Anna of Veldenz, led the government business for 7 years as regent after his death, until her sons came of age.

== Ancestors ==
Ancestors of Charles II of Baden-Durlach

8. Charles I, Margrave of Baden-Baden
4. Christopher I, Margrave of Baden
9. Catherine of Austria
2. Ernest, Margrave of Baden-Durlach
10. Philip II of Katzenelnbogen
5. Ottilie of Katzenelnbogen
11. Ottilie of Nassau-Siegen
1. Charles II, Margrave of Baden-Durlach
12. Wolf of Rosenfeld
6. Wolf of Rosenfeld
13. Margaretha Gremlich
3. Ursula of Rosenfeld
14. Wilhelm Bombast of Hohenheim
7. Anna Bombast of Hohenheim
15. Agnes Speth

== See also ==
- List of rulers of Baden

== Sources ==
- Hans Jürgen Rieckenberg (1977). "Karl II.". Neue Deutsche Biographie (in German). Vol. 11. Berlin: Duncker & Humblot. pp. 220–221.
- Arthur Kleinschmidt (1882). "Karl II., Markgraf von Baden-Durlach" . Allgemeine Deutsche Biographie (in German). Vol. 15. Leipzig: Duncker & Humblot. pp. 233–237.
- Karl Friedrich Vierordt: Geschichte der evangelischen Kirche in dem Großherzogthum Baden, vol. 1, Karlsruhe, 1847, pp. 420–441 at Google Books
- Joseph Elble: Die Einführung der Reformation im Markgräflerland und in Hochberg. 1556–1561, in: Freiburger Diözesan-Archiv, vol. 42 (1914), pp. 1–110
- Johann Pflüger: Geschichte der Stadt Pforzheim, Pforzheim, 1989 at Google Books
- Ernst Walter Zeeden: Kleine Reformationsgeschichte von Baden-Durlach und Kurpfalz, Karlsruhe, 1956
- Rudolf Burger: Die Reformation im Markgräflerland, Weil am Rhein, 1984

Charles II of Baden-Durlach House of Zähringen Born: 24 July 1529 Died: 23 March 1577
Preceded by Ernest	Margrave of Baden-Durlach; 1553–1577	Succeeded by Anna of Veldenz as Regent
