= Louis II, Count Palatine of Zweibrücken =

Louis II
- Count Palatine of Zweibrücken
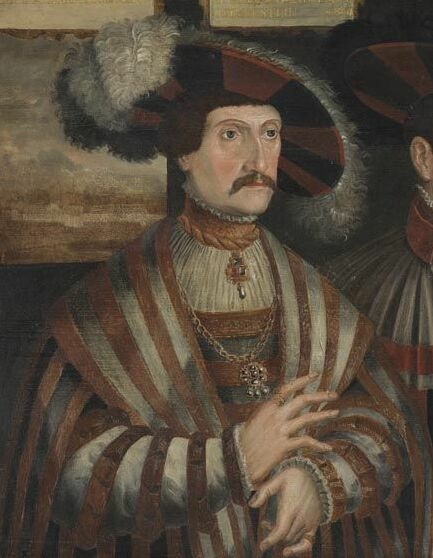
- Detail from Family Portrait of Ludwig II by Peter Gertner, c. 1530s
- Born: 14 September 1502; Zweibrücken
- Died: 3 December 1532 (aged 30); Zweibrücken
- Burial: Alexander's Church (Alexanderskirche) in Zweibrücken
- Spouse: Elisabeth of Hesse (m. 1525)
- Issue: Wolfgang, Count Palatine of Zweibrücken; Countess Palatine Christine
- House: Wittelsbach
- Father: Alexander, Count Palatine of Zweibrücken
- Mother: Margarete of Hohenlohe-Neuenstein

Louis II of Zweibrücken (German: Pfalzgraf Ludwig II. von Zweibrücken-Neuburg "der Jüngere") (14 September 1502 – 3 December 1532) was Count Palatine and Duke of Zweibrücken from 1514 to 1532.

== Early life ==
He was the son of Alexander, Count Palatine of Zweibrücken (1462–1514) and his wife Countess Margarete of Hohenlohe-Neuenstein (1480–1522).

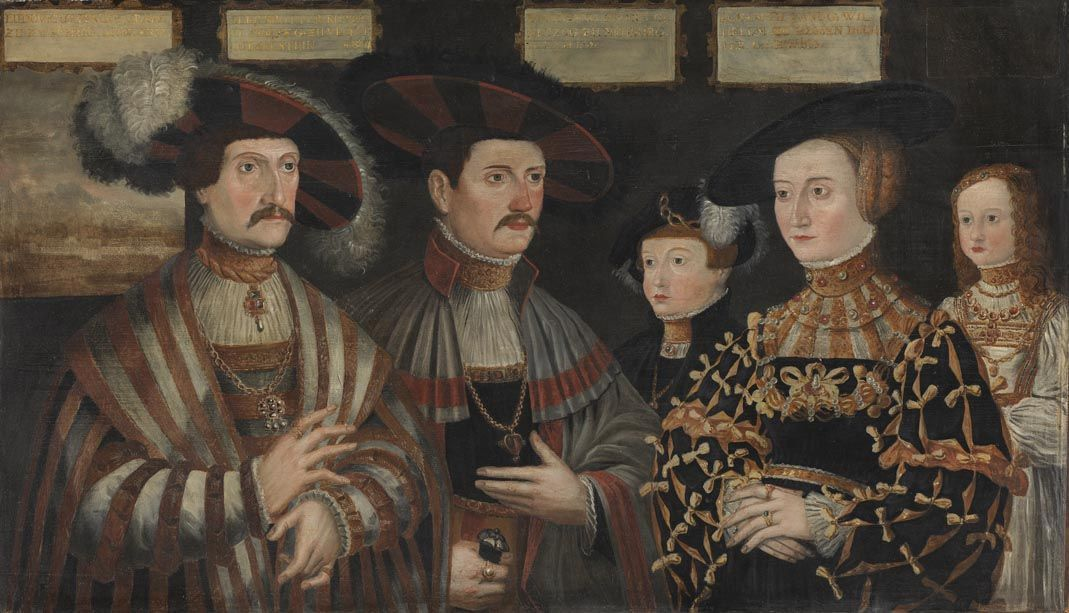
Louis II with his brother Rupert, wife Elisabeth and children, by Peter Gertner

== Marriage and issue ==
He was married in 1525 to Elisabeth of Hesse, daughter of William I, Landgrave of Lower Hesse, and they had two children. His son Wolfgang inherited the title and his daughter Christine died young in 1534.

== Death ==
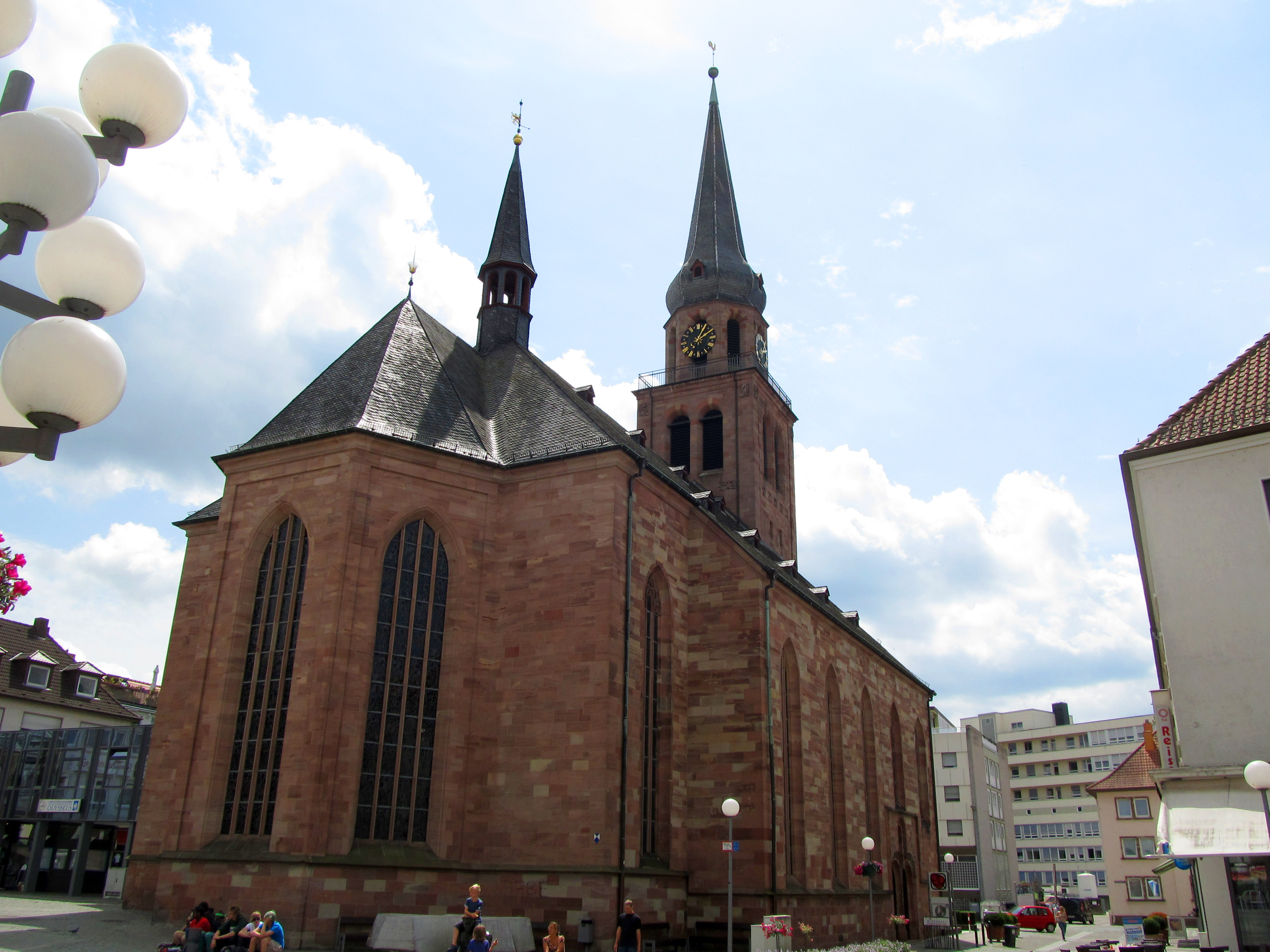
Alexanderskirche, burial place of Louis II

Louis II died on 3 December 1532 and was buried in the crypt of Alexanderskirche (a church named for his father, who funded the original construction) in Zweibrücken.

== Ancestors ==
Ancestors of Louis II, Count Palatine of Zweibrücken

16. Rupert of Germany
8. Stephen, Count Palatine of Simmern-Zweibrücken
17. Elisabeth of Nuremberg
4. Louis I, Count Palatine of Zweibrücken
18. Frederick III of Veldenz
9. Anna of Veldenz
19. Margaret of Nassau-Saarbrücken
2. Alexander, Count Palatine of Zweibrücken
20. Jean I de Croÿ
10. Antoine I de Croÿ
21. Marie de Craon
5. Johanna of Croÿ
22. Antoine, Count of Vaudémont
11. Margaret of Lorraine-Vaudémont
23. Marie, Countess of Harcourt
1. Louis II, Count Palatine of Zweibrücken
24. Albert I of Hohenlohe-Weikersheim
12. Kraft V of Hohenlohe-Weikersheim
25. Elisabeth of Hanau
6. Kraft VI of Hohenlohe
26. Frederick III of Oettingen
13. Margaret of Oettingen
27. Euphemia of Münsterberg
3. Margarete of Hohenlohe-Neuenstein
28. Eberhard IV, Count of Württemberg
14. Ulrich V, Count of Württemberg
29. Henriette of Mömpelgard
7. Helene of Württemberg
30. Amadeus VIII of Savoy
15. Margaret of Savoy
31. Mary of Burgundy

Louis II, Count Palatine of Zweibrücken House of Wittelsbach Born: 14 September 1502 Died: 3 December 1532
Preceded by Alexander	Duke of Zweibrücken; 1514–1532	Succeeded by Wolfgang
