= Occupation of Upper Baden =

The occupation of Upper Baden refers to the occupation of the upper part of the Margraviate of Baden-Baden by troops of Margrave Ernest Frederick of Baden-Durlach under Wolf Dietrich von Gemmingen (1550–1601) on 21 November 1594, and its subsequent administration which lasted until 1622.

== Occupied territories ==
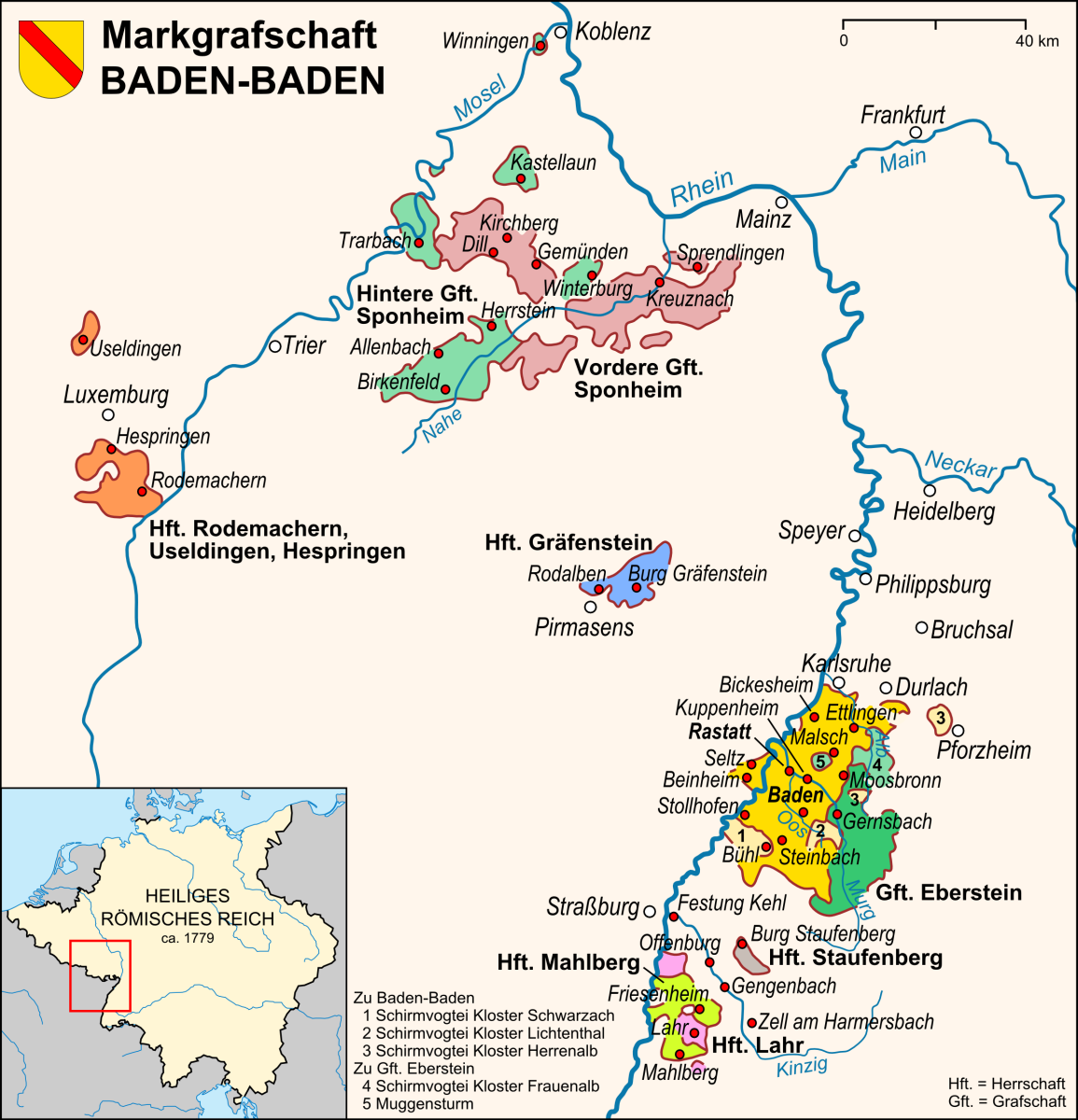
Map of the Margraviate

The main towns – Ettlingen, Baden-Baden, Kuppenheim, Stollhofen and Rastatt – were immediately occupied. The Lordship of Gräfenstein as well as the further and anterior regions of the County of Sponheim were not occupied; the dominions of Rodemachern, Useldingen and Hesperingen formed the separate Margraviate of Baden-Rodemachern at that time and were ruled by Philip III, a brother of Eduard Fortunat. An attempt by Ernest Frederick to take over the Lordship of Gräfenstein was fended off.

The Badenian portion of the County of Eberstein had been enfeoffed by Eduard Fortunat in the spring of 1595 to Philip III of Eberstein, for which he was to receive over 20,000 guldens to finance his mercenaries. Since the fief required the consent of Fortunat's brothers and agnates according to the laws of the House of Baden, Ernest Frederick first asked the Ebersteins to end the invalid contract of the estate. When they did not comply, Ernest Frederick sent his troops to the County of Eberstein and Philip III withheld his payment to Eduard Fortunat. The Lordships of Lahr and Mahlberg were soon occupied by Ernest Frederick.

== Legal basis ==
Ernest Frederick based his intervention legally on the pragmatic sanction of Margrave Christopher I of Baden and the Indemnification Agreement of 1537.

According to the house law of Margrave Christopher, the entire Baden territory continued to form a single unit despite all its subdivisions. After the death of Bernard III of Baden-Baden, an extended contractual relationship was agreed between the guardians of his children and his brother Ernest. If one line of the House of Baden defaulted in paying off their share of common debts and a claim was made against the other line by creditors, the other line had the right to indemnify itself by occupying the land of the defaulting line. This happened after a creditor of Margrave Eduard Fortunat of Baden-Baden tried to collect interest payments from the Baden-Durlach cities of Durlach and Pforzheim. Eduard Fortunat did not change his behaviour despite all warnings from his Durlach cousin and continued to live beyond his means.

== Literature ==
- Werner Baumann: Ernst Friedrich von Baden-Durlach. Die Bedeutung der Religion für Leben und Politik eines süddeutschen Fürsten im Zeitalter der Gegenreformation (= VKGLBW B 20), Stuttgart 1962, pp. 64 ff.
- Hugo Altmann: Die Rolle Maximilians I. von Bayern im Oberbadischen Okkupationsstreit, besonders 1614–1618. In: Zeitschrift für die Geschichte des Oberrheins, Band 121 (1973), pp. 327–360
- Michael Buhlmann: Badische Geschichte. Mittelalter – Neuzeit (= VA 29), St. Georgen 2007, pp. 27ff
- Hansmartin Schwarzmaier: Baden. Dynastie – Land – Staat (= Urban Tb 607), Stuttgart 2005, pp. 128ff
- Markgraf Ernst Friedrich: Grundtlicher Warhaffter und Bestendiger Bericht: Was sich vor und nach Unlangst durch den Herrn Ernest Friderichen Maggraven zu Baden ... fürgenommen Occupation, deß Obertheils deß Fürstenthumbs der Marggraffeschafft Baden mit einzihung etlicher Marggraff Eduardi Fortunati Dienern ... verloffen u.s.w., 1595
- Johann David Köhler: Ein Haupt rarer Thaler des so berüchtigten Marggrafens zu Baaden in Baaden, EDUARD FORTUNATS, von A. 1590, in: Der Wöchentlichen Historischen Münz-Belustigung, Theil, 16. Stück, 15 April 1744, pp. 117–124
- Ferdinand III., Kristina von Schweden: Westfälischer Friede – Vertrag von Osnabrück (Instrumentum Pacis Osnabrugensis). Frankfurt am Main, Philipp Jacob Fischer 1649.
  - full digital text of the Treaty of Osnabrück at Wikisource; Article IV; §26

=== Abbreviations ===
- VA = Vertex Alemanniae
- VKGLBW B = Veröffentlichungen der Kommission für geschichtliche Landeskunde Baden-Württemberg, Reihe B: Forschungen
