= Bernard IV of Baden-Durlach =

Bernard IV, Margrave of Baden-Durlach
- Born: 1517
- Died: 20 January 1553
- Buried: Pforzheim
- Noble family: House of Zähringen
- Father: Ernest, Margrave of Baden-Durlach
- Mother: Elisabeth of Brandenburg-Ansbach-Kulmbach

Bernard IV, Margrave of Baden-Durlach (born 1517 – died 20 January 1553) was Margrave of Baden-Pforzheim from 26 September 1552 until his death.

== Life ==
Bernhard was the second son from the first marriage of Margrave Ernest of Baden-Profzheim with Elisabeth of Brandenburg-Ansbach-Kulmbach.

Like his older brother Albert, Bernard has been attributed a dissolute life, and been described as a wild creature. His bad reputation halted negotiations between his father and the Duke of Cleves, brother of the fourth wife of King Henry VIII of England, Anne of Cleves, for him to marry the Duke's other sister Amelia. In 1537, he opposed the proposed division of his father's territory among his father's sons, and in particular against the rights of his half-brother Charles II, arguing that his father's second marriage had been morganatic. After his brother Albert died in 1542, his father forgave him his earlier opposition and promised him he would inherit Lower Baden.

In 1540 he acquired the citizenship of the city Basel. He also owed a debt to the city.

He ruled Lower Baden, with the cities of Pforzheim and Durlach from 26 September 1552 until his death, while his half-brother Charles II ruled Upper Baden. However, his rule lasted only a few months, as he died unexpectedly on 20 January 1553. He was buried in the Collegiate Church in Pforzheim.

== See also ==
- List of rulers of Baden

== Footnotes ==
Bernard IV of Baden-Durlach House of Zähringen Born: 1517
Preceded by Ernest	Margrave of Baden-Durlach; 1552–1553	Succeeded by Charles II
