= Anna Maria von Baden-Durlach =

German artist and poet

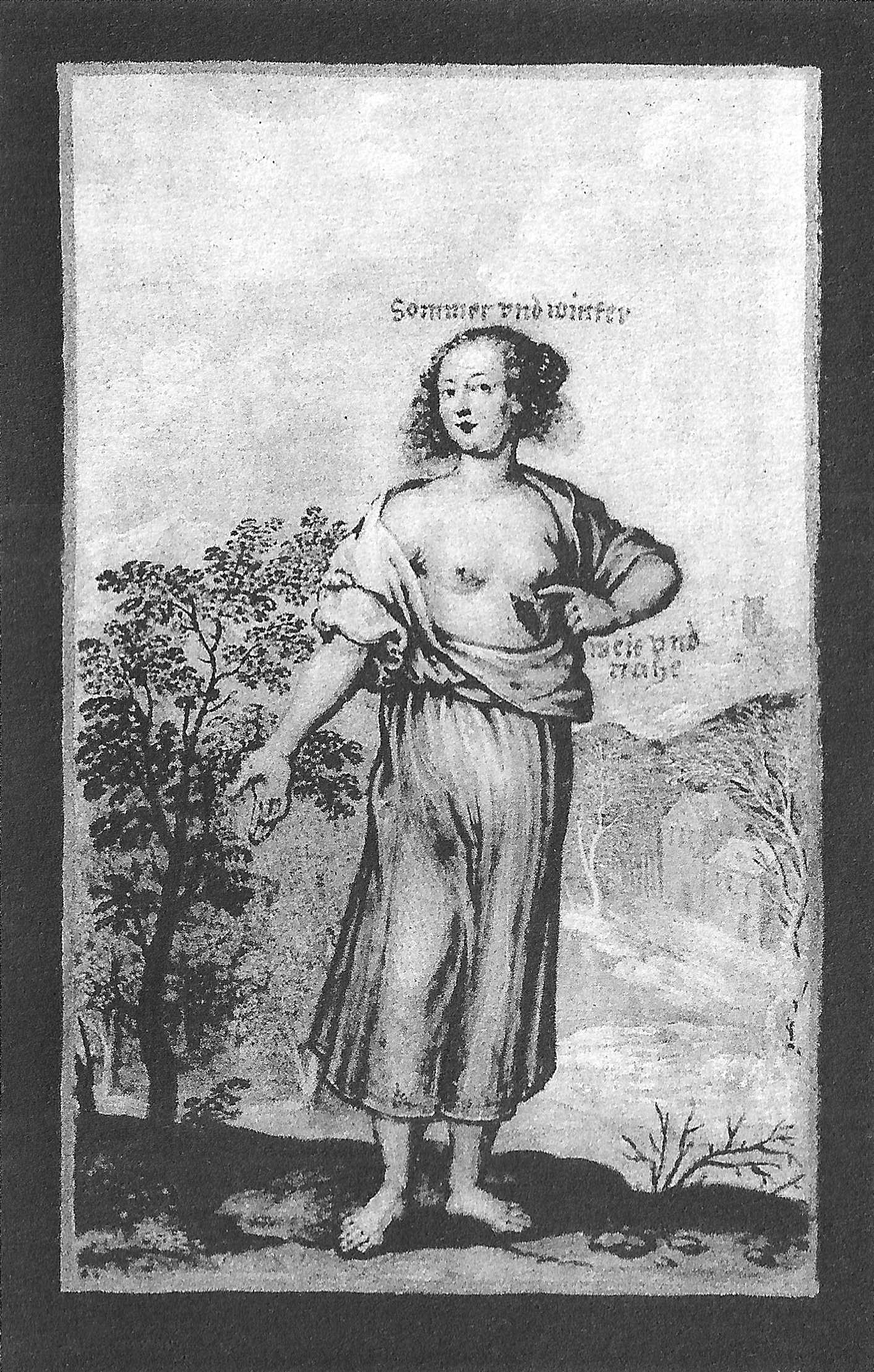
- Anna Maria Markgräfin von Baden-Durlach (Allegorical portrait miniature by Friedrich Brentel, 1645)
- Born: May 29, 1617; Strasbourg
- Died: October 17, 1672 (aged 55); Basel
- Resting place: Pforzheim
- Known for: Poetry, painting

Anna Maria von Baden-Durlach (May 29, 1617 – October 17, 1672) was a German poet and painter. She was a daughter of Margrave Georg Friedrich von Baden.

== Life ==
Anna Maria von Baden-Durlach was a daughter of Margrave Georg Friedrich von Baden from his second marriage to Agathe of Erbach. After the early death of her mother (1621) she grew up under the care of her "faithful Starschedelin" in the Margrave's Dragon Castle on the Ill in Strasbourg. Like her younger sister Elisabeth, she received a thorough education, although at the time the Thirty Years War was worsening. She had a poetic and artistic talent, and quite early she began to write and paint.

According to Karl Obser (1935), her poetry was influenced by the Strasbourg "Sincere Society of the Firs". She wrote poems and sayings. "They are free of baroque tears and express their instructive wisdom and their simple-religious meaning in a pleasing way. The poetic element is small, but the God-given view of life finds and gives consolation". "Some examples of headings may illustrate their moral purpose and life experience: Anger is an evil of all evils. A faithful friend is a great treasure, praise of humility, thought from eternity, Beauty passes, virtue persists."

Anna Maria of Baden-Durlach also wrote a longer poem about the Swedish king Gustavus Adolphus (1647), a lovely bukolika on "the Lord's President Selmmitzen Feldgut zu Berghausen". She also translated poems from Italian and French, occasional poems wrote to name days. Her literary work was not published during her lifetime.

Among her works there are red chalk, Indian ink and pen drawings, portraits and tracings on the Dutch model, animal and flower displays. Her work was usually given to family members or friends.

Anna Maria von Baden-Durlach was closely associated with her younger sister Elisabeth, who was also artistically active, but less gifted. They worked together on many things. Anna Maria maintained contacts to numerous artists. She was skilled in the field of paper cutting. After she had spent her youth in Strasbourg, she later lived alternately in the Margravial courts in Basel and Strasbourg. She remained unmarried. Although she died in Basel, she was buried in Pforzheim on November 1, 1672.
