= Margraviate of Baden-Durlach =

German principality (1535–1771)

Margraviate of Baden-Durlach Markgrafschaft Baden-Durlach
- 1535–1771
- Coat of arms

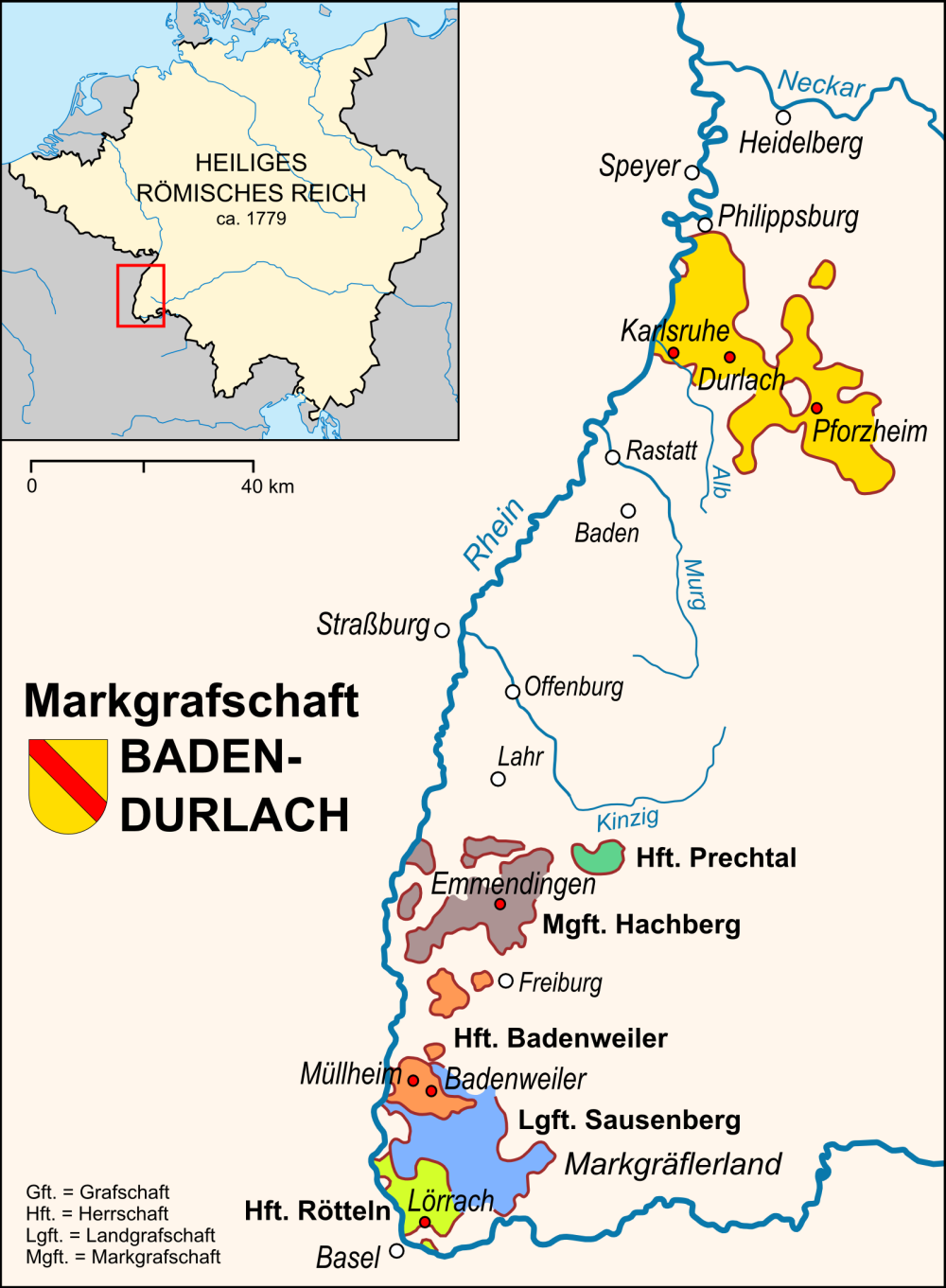
- Status: Margraviate
- Capital: Pforzheim (1535–1565); Durlach (1565–1718); Karlsruhe (1718–1771)
- Common languages: German
- Religion: Lutheran (from 1556)
- Government: Monarchy
- History
  - Established: 1535
  - Unified with Baden-Baden: 1771

Area
  - Total: 1,631 km^{2} (630 sq mi)

Population
  - 1746 estimate: 90000
- Currency: Rhenish gulden South German gulden (fl.)
Preceded by	Succeeded by
Margraviate of Baden	Margraviate of Baden
- Today part of: Germany

The Margraviate of Baden-Durlach was an early modern territory of the Holy Roman Empire, in the upper Rhine valley, which existed from 1535 to 1771. It was formed when the Margraviate of Baden was split between the sons of Margrave Christopher I and was named for its capital, Durlach. The other half of the territory became the Margraviate of Baden-Baden, located between the two halves of Baden-Durlach. Baden-Durlach became Lutheran during the Protestant Reformation, unlike Baden-Baden, which remained Catholic. Baden-Durlach occupied Baden-Baden from 1594 to 1622, but was driven out after being defeated at the Battle of Wimpfen, during the Thirty Years' War (1618–1648). The territory was ravaged during the Nine Years' War (1688–1697). Following the extinction of the Baden-Baden line in 1771, the Baden-Durlach inherited their territories and reunited the Margraviate of Baden. The reunified territory was caught up in the French Revolutionary and Napoleonic Wars, emerging in 1806 as the Grand Duchy of Baden.

== Territory ==
The Margraviate of Baden-Durlach encompassed an area on the middle Upper Rhine around the cities of Pforzheim and Durlach, as well as the Margraviate of Hachberg around Emmendingen, and an area known as Markgräflerland in the southern part of the Upper Rhine region, between Müllheim and Lörrach.

In detail, the territorial components were as follows:

Lower Margraviate (c. 40% of the total area)

- Lower Margraviate of Baden-Durlach
  - Oberamt of Pforzheim
  - Amt of Stein/Langensteinbach
  - Oberamt of Durlach
  - Oberamt Karlsruhe (earlier composed of the Ämter of Mühlburg, Staffort and Graben)
- The incorporated fief of Rhodt unter Rietburg in the Palatinate und Münzesheim im Kraichgau

Upper Margraviate (c. 60% of the total area)

- Oberamt of Hachberg
  - Margraviate of Baden-Hachberg
  - Lordship of Prechtal (Condominium with Fürstenberg)
- Markgräflerland
  - Lordship of Badenweiler (also Oberamt Badenweiler)
  - Oberamt of Rötteln (c. 450 km^{2} (170 sq mi))
    - Landgraviate of Sausenberg
    - Lordship of Rötteln Castle.

Baden-Durlach held two individual votes (Virilstimme) on the temporal bench of the Imperial Diet, as well as a third individual vote for the Margraviate of Hachberg. It had the same representation of the diet of the imperial circle of Swabia.

== History ==
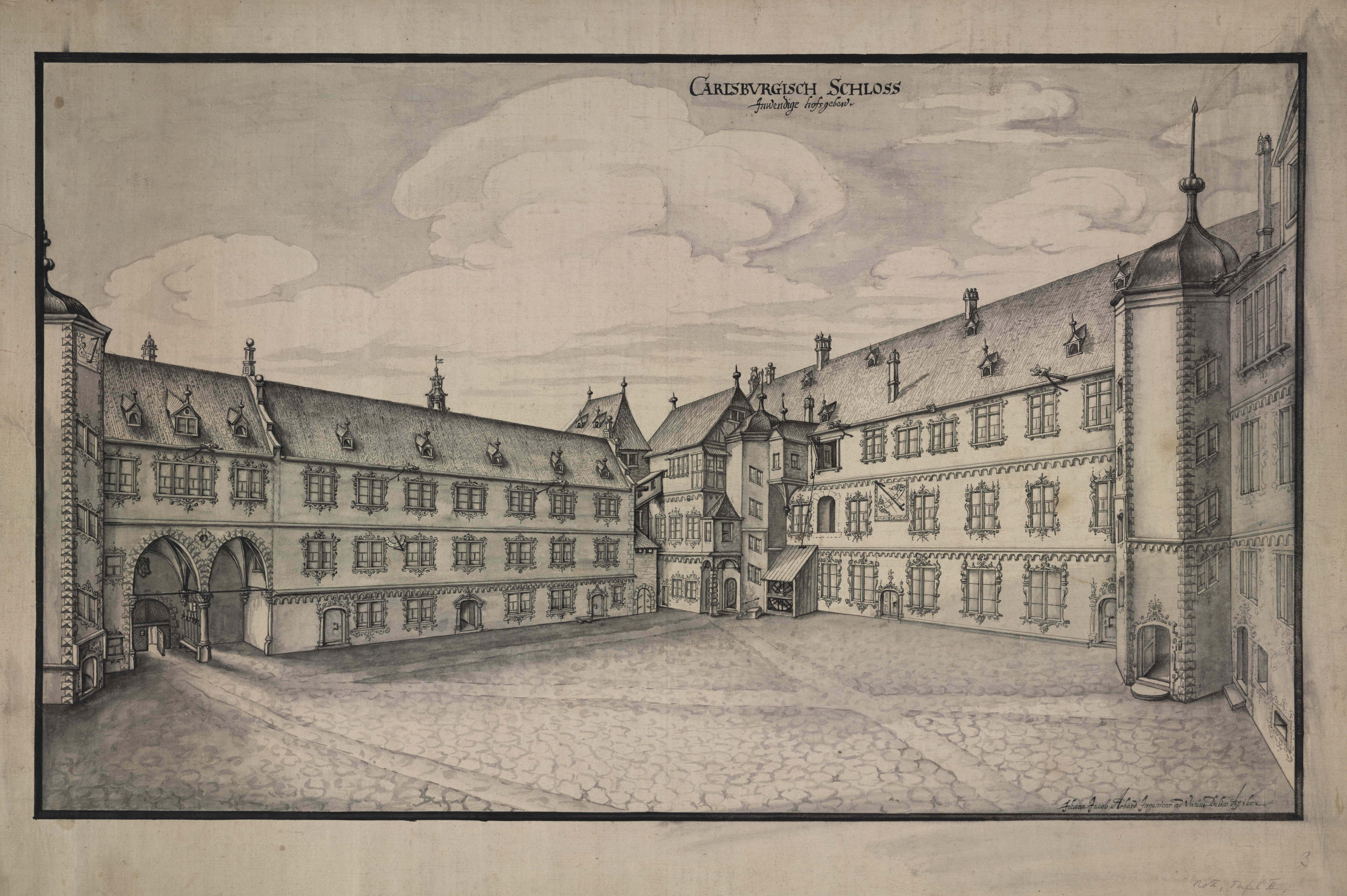
The Durlach palace, Karlsburg Castle, in 1652

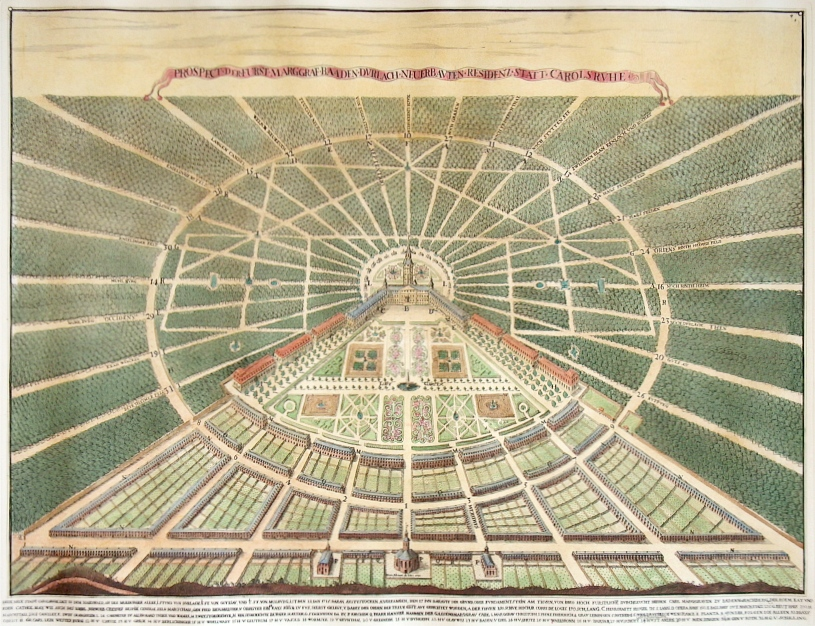
Idealised city plan of Karlsruhe, print of 1721

In 1535, the Margraviate of Baden was split into the Margraviates of Baden-Baden and Baden-Durlach. Margrave Charles II chose to support the Protestant Reformation in 1556 and transferred his residence from Pforzheim to Karlsburg Castle in Durlach in 1565.

In 1594, Baden-Durlach exercised control over Baden-Baden in what is known as the Oberbadische Okkupation (Upper Baden Occupation), after Margrave George Frederick seized the territory in light of his relatives' bankruptcy. Having never received imperial authorisation for the seizure, George Frederick joined the Protestant Union in an effort to protect his claims. This ended in 1622 during the Thirty Years' War, after George Frederick was defeated at the Battle of Wimpfen and forced to abdicate and return Baden-Baden to his relations. During the Nine Years' War, Pforzheim and Durlach were burnt to the ground.

From 1715, Margrave Charles III William built his new residence, Karlsruhe Palace, in an empty area. The city that developed around the palace would later become Karlsruhe.

In 1771, Margrave Charles Frederick inherited the Margraviate of Baden-Baden, reunifying the Margraviate of Baden.

The summer residence of the margraves of Baden-Durlach was the Markgräflerhof in Basel, Switzerland, where the margraves also owned a number of other properties.

== Arms ==
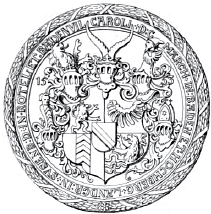
Seal of Charles II.

The coat of arms underwent changes over time. Here the coat of arms depicted on the seal of Margrave Charles II is described:

The central shield contained the red Badian diagonal band on a golden background. In the upper left field was the crowned red lion of the Landgraves of Sausenberg. The upper right field showed the wing of the lords of Üsenberg Castle. The lower left had a vertical band with three chevrons, the arms of the lordship of Badenweiler. In the lower right field was the red lion of the lords of Rötteln.

The coat of arms was surrounded by five helmets. The upper middle one bears the Badian ibex horns. Alongside it is a helmet with the Sausenberg lion and one with the upper part of a man wearing the wing of the Üsenberg arms. On the left side of the arms is a helmet with the upper part of a young man, who wears the vertical band of the Badenweiler arms, and at right is a helmet with a bishop's mitre, symbolising the Schirmvogtei held by the lordship of Rötteln over several monasteries.

== Military ==
According to the Imperial Register, the Margraviate was obliged to supply troops to the Swabian Circle. In addition to these troops, the Margraves also built up a force of household troops (a bodyguard).

In 1770, the margraviate had a total of 807 soldiers in service (including both the circle troops and the household troops), consisting of four companies of a grenadier battalion, a fusilier division, and a company of dragoons.

The largest force raised in the history of Baden-Durlach was recruited by Margrave George Frederick in 1622 for the Palatinate campaign of the Thirty Years' War. It consisted of 11,500 men, only half of which were recruited locally from the margraviate's militia, with the rest on loan from George Frederick's allies; the territory was too small and poor to pay for professional soldiers beyond the margrave's own bodyguard. George Frederick's army ceased to exist when he was defeated at the Battle of Wimpfen, the remnants of the army being absorbed by the Count of Mansfeld's forces.

== Calendar ==
Before 1582, like the rest of the Empire, the Margraviate employed the Julian Calendar. In 1582, the Margraviate of Baden-Baden adopted the Gregorian Calendar, such that 4 October 1582 was followed directly by 15 October 1582, but Baden-Durlach, as a Protestant state, retained the Julian Calendar, since the new calendar had been promulgated by the Pope.

The Corpus Evangelicorum in the Imperial Diet agreed to adopt the Gregorian Calendar only in 1699. Baden-Durlach followed the decision and adopted the new calendar in 1700, with 18 February being followed directly by 1 March 1700. Some parish books from the Margraviate show that individual churches did not all follow suit immediately.

== Religion ==
Initially, the Margraviate was Roman Catholic, like the rest of the Holy Roman Empire, but on 1 June 1556, Margrave Charles II decreed a new Church Order on the Württemberg (i.e. Lutheran) model and initiated the Reformation in his territory.

Although his two oldest sons abandoned Lutheranism (Ernest Frederick converted to Calvinism in 1599 and James III converted to Catholicism in 1590), Baden-Durlach remained Lutheran since the third son, George Frederick did not convert, outlived his brothers and inherited both of their territories.

The Margrave was also the leader of the local Protestant church. The daily administration of the church was dealt with by a Church council (Kirchenrat). Two General Superintendents were appointed, one for the Lower territories and another for the Upper territories, who oversaw the Special Superintendents who administered the individual dioceses, which in turn administered the individual parishes. Consistency of doctrine was maintained by regular visitations.

== Culture ==
=== Dialect ===
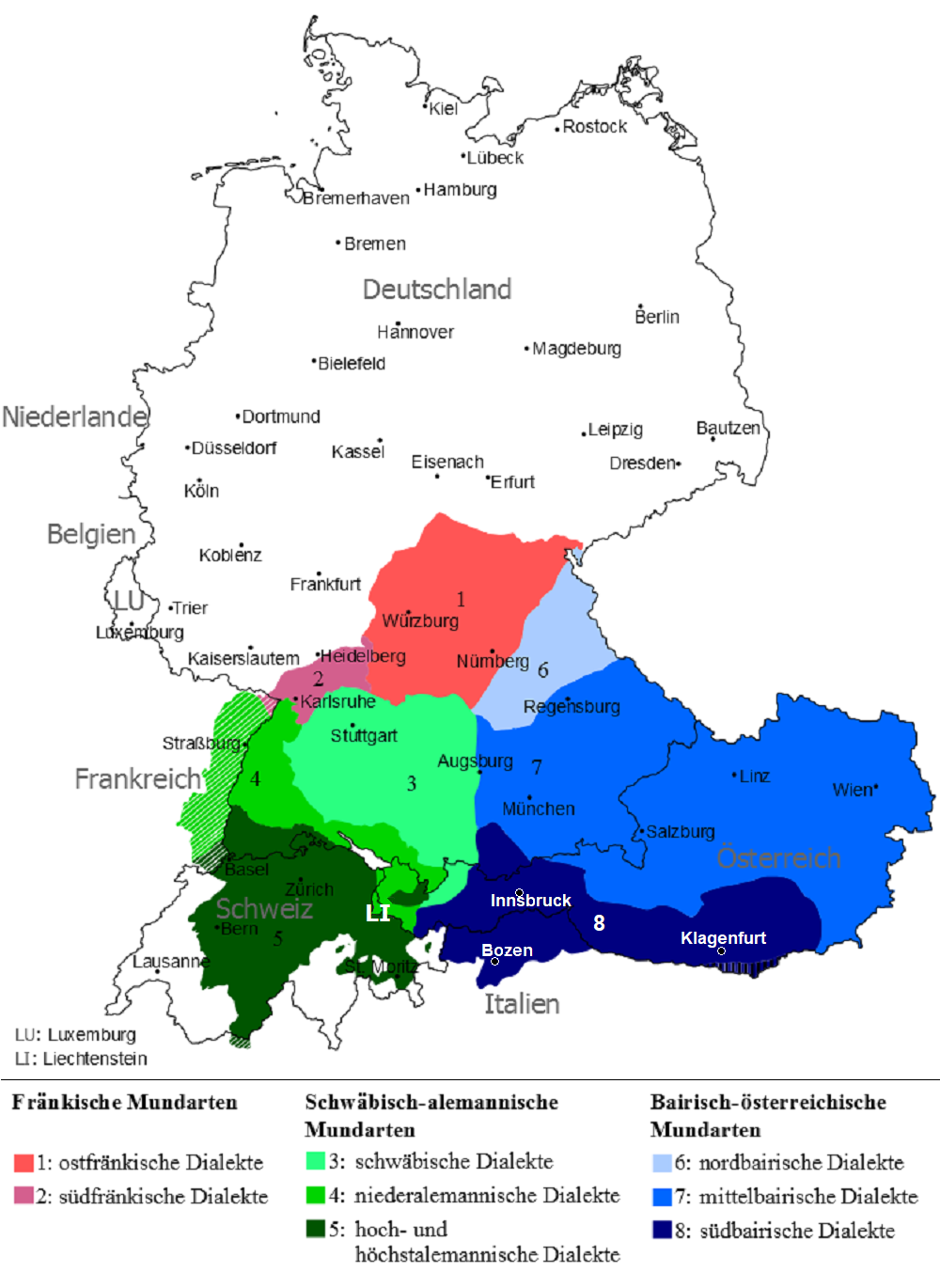
Overview of the High German dialects

Even in language, the Margraviate was not unified. The Landgraviate of Sausenberg and the Lordships of Badenweiler und Rötteln spoke High Alemannic, while the Margraviate of Hachberg used Low Alemannic and the Lower Margraviate (Karlsruhe-Pforzheim) employed a South Franconian dialect.

=== Education ===
The Margraviate never had a university. However, the level of the highest school, the gymnasium illustre in Karlsruhe, was at times equivalent to a university. Originally, the institution mainly served to educate orthodox priests to safeguard the Reformation. The school was established in Durlach in 1586 and transferred to Karlsruhe by Charles III William in 1724. It is now the Markgrafen-Gymnasium Karlsruhe.

=== Music and theater ===
The Badische Staatskapelle symphony orchestra is first attested in 1662. Its masters were: Enoch Blinzig (1707–1708), Giuseppe Beniventi (1712–1718), Johann Philipp Käfer (1718–1722), Johann Melchior Molter (1722-1733 and 1743–1765), and Giacinto Sciatti (1765–1776).

== List of margraves ==
From 1577 to 1584 and 1738 to 1746, there were regencies for underage rulers. These regents are mentioned in the text, but not listed asmargraves.

Name (lifetime)	Reign	Notes
Ernest	1515–1553	Son of Margrave Christopher I of Baden. Regent over Upper Baden after his father's loss of capacity in 1515. After the death of his brother Philip I in 1533 and the division of the Margraviate, he founded the House of Baden-Pforzheim (later Baden-Durlach), also known after him as the "Ernestian Line."
Charles II	1553–1577	Son of Ernest. From 1552, regent along with his half-brother Bernard IV, but after the latter's death in 1553, he became sole Margrave. In 1556 after the Peace of Augsburg he joined the Reformation. In 1565 he transferred the residence to Karlsburg Castle in Durlach.
Ernest Frederick	1584–1604	Son of Charles II. Regency while he was underage was held by the Margravine Anna of Veldenz and various Protestant princes from 1577 to 1584. A new division of territory in which Ernest Frederick took Durlach and Pforzheim and his brothers James III (1562–1590) and George Frederick took Hachberg and Rötteln-Sausenberg respectively. He established a gymnasium in Durlach. In 1594 he used the debts of Edward Fortunatus as an excuse for the military occupation of the Margraviate of Baden-Baden (Oberbadische Okkupation). In 1599, he rejected the Formula of Concord and converted from Lutheranism to Calvinism, which led to unrest.
George Frederick	1604–1622	Son of Charles II. From 1595 regent of the upper territories, after the death of his older brothers he became sole Margrave of Baden-Durlach in 1604 and de facto ruler of Baden-Baden. A pious Protestant and founding member of the Protestant Union. Abdicated in favour of his son in 1622, after his defeat at the Battle of Wimpfen.
Frederick V	1622–1659	Son of George Frederick. Occupation and plundering of Baden-Durlach by Imperial troops. To escape the Edict of Restitution, he allied with Sweden in 1631 and joined them in attacking Baden-Baden and parts of Breisgau. Fled to Basel after his defeat at the Battle of Nördlingen. The Emperor declared him to have abdicated and abolished the Margraviate, but it was restored in the Peace of Westphalia.
Frederick VI	1659–1677	Son of Frederick V. General of the Swedish army. Summoned the Landstände for the last time. Fought in the Fourth Austro-Turkish War and the Franco-Dutch War on the side of the Habsburgs. In 1674 he became Imperial General Field Marshal.
Frederick VII Magnus	1677–1709	Son of Frederick VI, focussed mainly on domestic politics. Occupation and plundering by French troops in the Nine Years' War (1688–1697) and the War of the Spanish Succession (1701–1714). Fled to Basel.
Charles III William	1709–1738	Son of Frederick VII. Officer during the War of the Spanish Succession, Imperial General Field Marshal in 1715. Reigned as an absolute monarch, restored state finances, and created a reliable bureaucracy. In 1715 he began work on a new residence, the Karlsruhe Palace and the new city of Karlsruhe.
Charles Frederick (* 22 November 1728 in Karlsruhe; † 10 June 1811)	1738/1746–1811	Son of hereditary prince Frederick (1703–1732) and grandson of Charles III William. Until 1746, a regency under Prince Charles August was in charge. Enlightened absolutist and follower of the Physiocrats. In 1771, the reunification of Baden took place after the extinction of the Baden-Baden line. Final loss of the territories on the left bank of the Rhine during the Revolutionary Wars, but was recognised as ruler by Napoleon. Elector in 1803, Grand Duke and joined the Confederation of the Rhine in 1806. Significantly expanded Baden through the annexation of the territories of Electoral Palatinate on the right bank of the Rhine, Breisgau, and Ortenau, and through German mediatisation

== See also ==
- List of rulers of Baden

== Sources ==
- Armin Kohnle: Kleine Geschichte der Markgrafschaft Baden. G. Braun Buchverlag, Karlsruhe 2007, ISBN 978-3-7650-8346-4
- Karl Stiefel: Baden 1648–1952, Karlsruhe 1979, 2 Volumes
- Hans Rott: Kunst und Künstler am Baden-Durlacher Hof bis zur Gründung Karlsruhes, Karlsruhe: Müller 1917
- Eberhard Gothein: Die badischen Markgrafschaften im 16. Jahrhundert, Heidelberg 1910 (Digitalisat im Internet Archive)
- Wilson, Peter H. (2009). Europe's Tragedy: A History of the Thirty Years War. Allen Lane. ISBN 978-0-7139-9592-3.

Description of the condition of the margraviate in at the beginning of Karl Frederick's reign:

- C.W.F.L. Freiherr von Drais: Geschichte der Regierung und Bildung von Baden unter Carl Friedrich vor der Revolutionszeit – Erster Band. C.F. Müller’sche Hofbuchhandlung, Carlsruhe 1816 (Margraviate of Baden-Durlach at Google Books)
- Johann Christian Sachs: Einleitung in die Geschichte der Marggravschaft und des marggrävlichen altfürstlichen Hauses Baden:
  - Margraviate of Baden-Durlach at Google Books
  - Margraviate of Baden-Durlach at Google Books
