= Ursula of Rosenfeld =

- Born: c. 1499
- Died: 26 February 1538 (aged 38–39)
- Spouse: Ernest, Margrave of Baden-Durlach
- Father: Wolf of Rosenfeld
- Mother: Anna Bombast of Hohenheim

Ursula of Rosenfeld (c. 1499 – 26 February 1538) was the second wife of Margrave Ernest of Baden-Durlach. All grand dukes of Baden descend from her, via her son Charles II.

== Early life ==
Ursula was born c. 1499 as the youngest child of Wolfgang von Rosenfeld (d. 1518) and his wife, Anna Bombast of Hohenheim (1574), sister of Georg Bombast von Hohenheim (d. 1566), member of the Order of St. John, who served as grand prior of Germany. As her family was not part of the small circle of reigning families, they were considered lower nobility and therefore seen as not befitting enough for the marriage purpose with the sovereign family, such as with the House of Baden. Her father was Schultheiß of the town of Rosenfeld in the Duchy of Württemberg. According to legend, the family lived in the stately "Ursula house", which dates to the early 15th century.

== Biography ==
Ursula was a lady-in-waiting of Margravine Elisabeth of Brandenburg-Ansbach-Kulmbach, the first wife of Margrave Ernest of Baden-Durlach. Elisabeth died on 31 May 1518. Soon afterwards, probably later in 1518, Ernest married Ursula. Although she was lower nobility, their marriage was not considered morganatic, because she became a Margravine by marriage. On her tomb stone, she is referred to as "the illustrious Lady Ursula, Margravine of Baden and Hochberg, wife of the illustrious Prince Lord Ernest, Margrave of Baden and Hochberg" (ILL. DNA VRSV=LA MARCHIONISSA / BADEN ET HOCHBERG ILLVSTRIS PRINCIPIS / DNI ERNESTI MARCHIONIS IN BADEN ET HOCHBERG CONIUNX).

Ursula died on 26 February 1538 and was buried in the castle church in Pforzheim. Ernest constructed a double tomb stone in the form of a sarcophagus in her honor in the choir of the castle church.

== Issue ==
According to the chronicle, Ernest and Ursula had "many children". Accurate lists of their children have not survived. Three children are known to be hers:

- Margaret (1519-1571), married on 12 November 1538 Count Wolfgang II of Oettingen (1511-1572)
- Salome (d. 1549), married in 1540 to Count Ladislaus of Fraunberg-Haag (1505-1566)
- Charles II (24 July 1529 – 23 March 1577), Margrave of Baden-Durlach
