= Louis III of Württemberg =

German noble (1554–1593)

Louis III
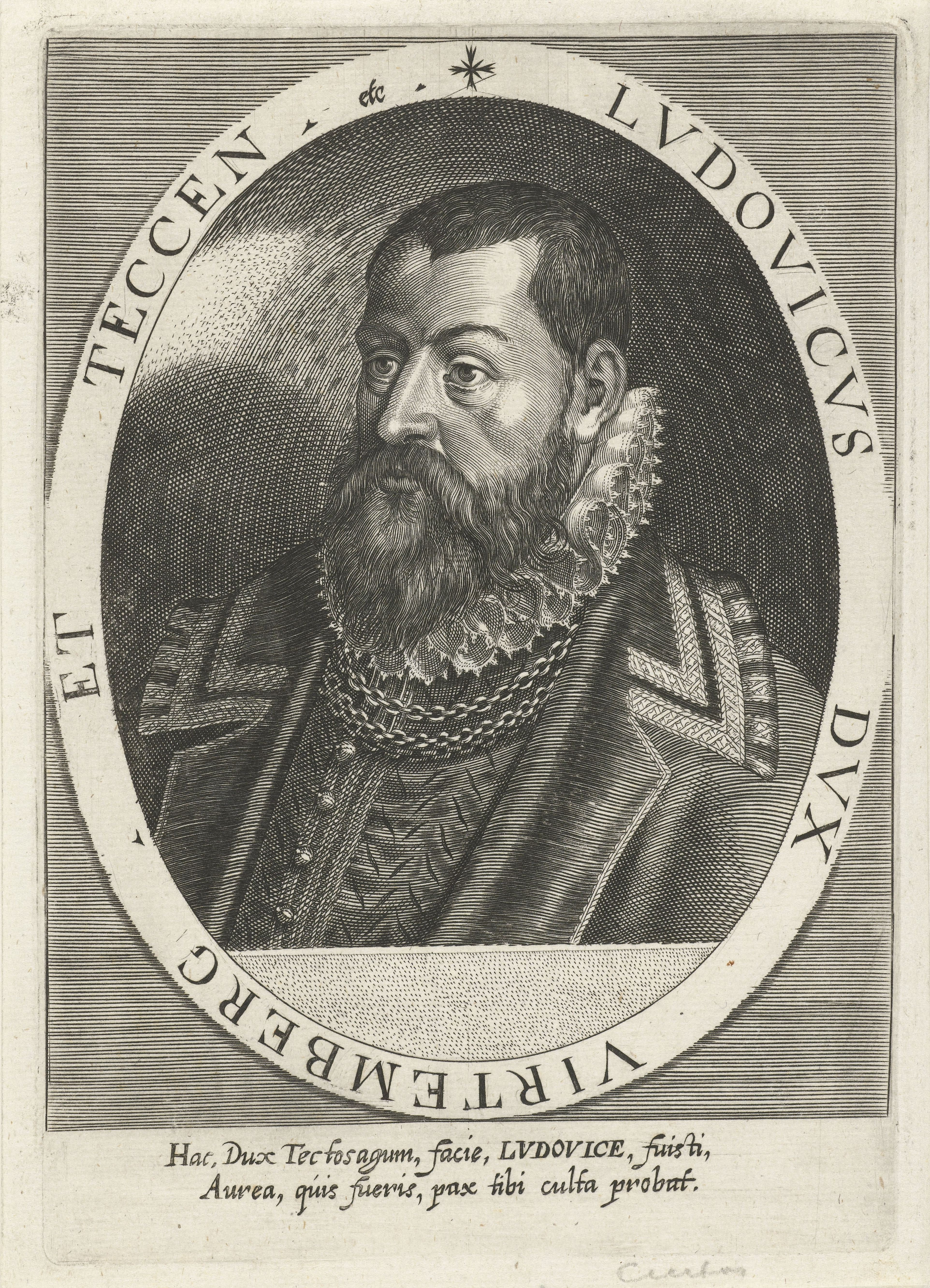

Duke of Württemberg
- Reign: 28 December 1568 – 18 August 1593
- Predecessor: Christoph
- Successor: Frederick I
- Born: 1 January 1554; Stuttgart
- Died: 18 August 1593 (aged 39); Stuttgart
- Spouses: Dorothea Ursula of Baden-Durlach (m. 1575; died 1583) Ursula of Veldenz (m. 1585)
- House: Württemberg
- Father: Christoph, Duke of Württemberg
- Mother: Anna Maria of Brandenburg-Ansbach

Louis III, Duke of Württemberg, (German: Ludwig der Fromme; 1 January 1554, in Stuttgart – 18 August 1593, in Stuttgart) was a German nobleman. He was the Duke of Württemberg, from 1568 until his death.

The only surviving son of Christoph, Duke of Württemberg and Anna Maria of Brandenburg-Ansbach, Louis succeeded his father on his death on 28 December 1568. His reign was at first under the guardianship of his mother Anna Maria von Brandenburg-Ansbach, Duke Wolfgang von Zweibrücken and Margraves George Frederick, Margrave of Brandenburg-Ansbach and Charles II, Margrave of Baden-Durlach, in the name of Count Heinrich II zu Castell.

== Marriages ==
Louis married twice. On 7 November 1575, he married Dorothea Ursula (20 June 1559 – 19 May 1583), a daughter of Margrave Charles II of Baden-Durlach and Anne of Veldenz. His second wife was Ursula (24 February 1572 – 5 March 1635), a daughter of Count Palatine George John I of Zweibrücken-Veldenz. Both marriages were childless.

== Sources ==
- Hohkamp, Michaela (2007). "Sisters, Aunts, and Cousins: Familial Architectures and the Political Field in Early Modern Europe". In Sabean, David Warren; Mathieu, Jon; Teuscher, Simon (eds.). Kinship in Europe: Approaches to Long-Term Development (1300-1900). Berghahn Books. ISBN 9780857456861.

Louis III of Württemberg House of Württemberg Born: 1 January 1554 Died: 18 August 1593
| Preceded by Christoph | Duke of Württemberg; 1569–1593 | Succeeded by Frederick I |
