= Rupert, Count Palatine of Veldenz =

Count of Veldenz from 1543 to 1544

Rupert
- Count Palatine of Veldenz
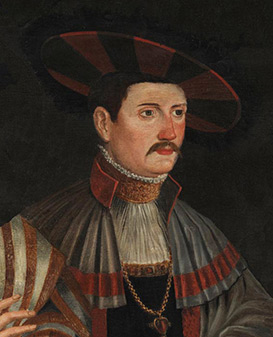
- portrait of Rupert by Peter Gertner
- Born: 1506; Zweibrücken
- Died: 28 July 1544; Gräfenstein Castle, Merzalben
- Noble family: House of Wittelsbach
- Spouse: Ursula of Salm-Kyrburg
- Issue: Anne; George John; Ursula
- Father: Alexander, Count Palatine of Zweibrücken
- Mother: Margarete of Hohenlohe-Neuenstein

Rupert (German: Ruprecht) (1506 – 28 July 1544) was the Count of Veldenz from 1543 until 1544.

== Life ==
Rupert was born in Zweibrücken in 1506 as the youngest son of Alexander, Count Palatine of Zweibrücken. As a younger son, Rupert was designated by his father into a church career, while his older brother Louis became the next Count Palatine of Zweibrücken. In 1517, he became a member of the Cathedral of Strasbourg, a position he held until early 1533, after his brother Louis had died in December 1532. Rupert then served as regent and guardian for Louis' young son Wolfgang, the new Count Palatine of Zweibrücken.

When Wolfgang reached majority in 1543, one of his first actions was to enact the Marburger Contract, granting his uncle Rupert the County of Veldenz. Rupert died the following year and was succeeded as Count of Veldenz by his son, George John.

== Marriage and issue ==
Rupert married Ursula of Salm-Kyrburg (c. 1515 – 24 July 1601), daughter of Wild- and Rhinegrave John VII, on 23 June 1537 and had the following children:

1. Anne (12 May 1540 – 28 July 1586)
2. George John (11 April 1543 – 18 April 1592)
3. Ursula (born 3 October 1543, date of death unknown)

Regnal titles
Preceded by Wolfgang	Count of Veldenz; 1543 – 1544	Succeeded by George John I
