= Alexander, Count Palatine of Zweibrücken =

Duke and Count Palatine of Zweibrücken and Count of Veldenz

Alexander of Zweibrücken
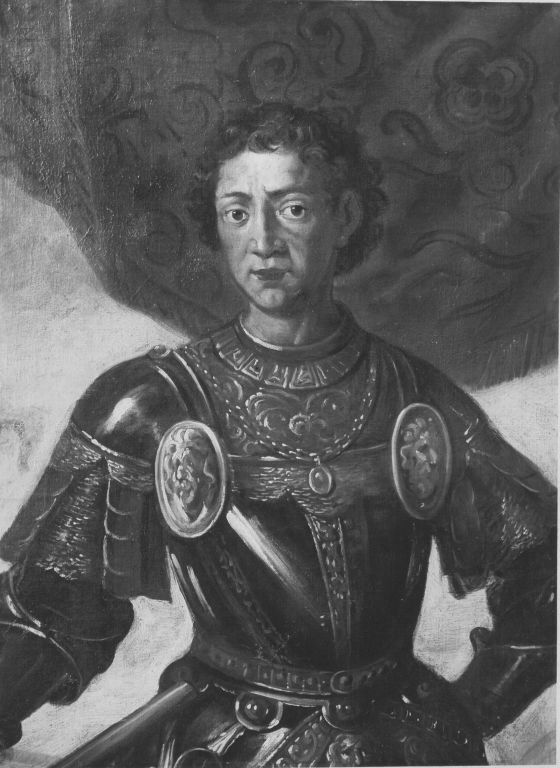
- Born: 26 November 1462
- Died: 21 October 1514 (aged 51); Zweibrücken
- Noble family: House of Wittelsbach
- Spouse: Margarete of Hohenlohe-Neuenstein
- Issue Detail: Louis II; Rupert
- Father: Louis I, Count Palatine of Zweibrücken
- Mother: Johanna of Croÿ

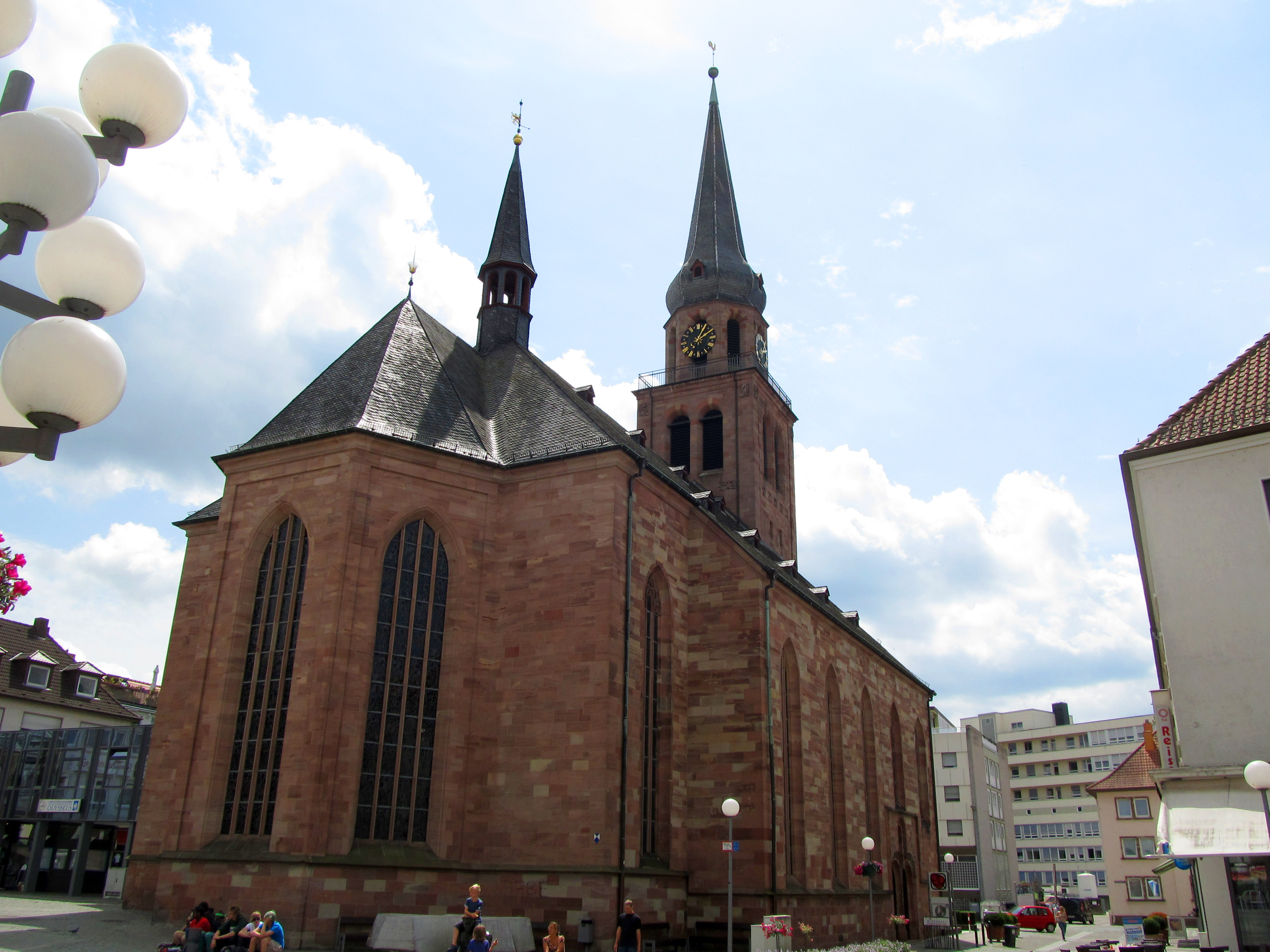
Alexanderskirche, built starting in 1493 by Alexander

Alexander of Zweibrücken (German: Pfalzgraf Alexander von Zweibrücken "der Hinkende") (26 November 1462 – 21 October 1514) was Count Palatine, Duke of Zweibrücken and Count of Veldenz in 1489–1514.

== Life ==
He was the son of Louis I, Count Palatine of Zweibrücken and his wife Johanna of Croÿ.

Alexander's Church (Alexanderskirche) is the oldest church in Zweibrücken, a late-Gothic Protestant hall church built from 1493 to 1514 as a gift from Alexander after his return from a pilgrimage to the Holy Land. Its crypt is the burial place of numerous counts/dukes of his house's line.

== Family ==
He was married in 1499 in Zweibrücken to Countess Margarete of Hohenlohe-Neuenstein, daughter of Count Kraft VI of Hohenlohe and Helene of Württemberg. They had the following children:

1. Johanna (1499–1537), a nun in Trier.
2. Louis II (1502–1532).
3. George (1503–1537).
4. Margarete (1509–1522), a nun at Marienberg bei Boppard.
5. Rupert, a canon in Trier, Strassburg and Cologne, then count Palatine of Veldenz (1506–1544).
6. Katharina (1510–1542), married before 1 February 1541 to Count Otto IV of Rietberg.

== Ancestors ==
Ancestors of Alexander, Count Palatine of Zweibrücken

16. Rupert II, Elector Palatine
8. Rupert of Germany
17. Beatrice of Sicily (1326–1365)
4. Stephen, Count Palatine of Simmern-Zweibrücken
18. Frederick V, Burgrave of Nuremberg
9. Elisabeth of Nuremberg
19. Elisabeth of Meissen
2. Louis I, Count Palatine of Zweibrücken
20. Henry III of Veldenz
10. Frederick III, Count of Veldenz
21. Loretta of Sponheim
5. Anna of Veldenz
22. John I, Count of Nassau-Weilburg
11. Margaret of Nassau-Saarbrücken
23. Joanna of Saarbrücken
1. Alexander, Count Palatine of Zweibrücken
24. Guillaume de Croÿ
12. Jean I de Croÿ
25. Isabeau de Renty
6. Antoine I de Croÿ
26. John I of Craon
13. Marie de Craon
27. Marie de Châtillon-sur-Marne
3. Johanna of Croÿ
28. Frederick of Lorraine, Count of Vaudémont
14. Antoine, Count of Vaudémont
29. Margaret of Joinville
7. Margaret of Lorraine-Vaudémont
30. John VII of Harcourt
15. Marie, Countess of Harcourt
31. Marie of Alençon

Alexander, Count Palatine of Zweibrücken House of Wittelsbach Born: 26 November 1462 Died: 21 October 1514
Preceded by Louis I	Duke of Zweibrücken; 1489–1514	Succeeded by Louis II
Preceded by Louis I	Count of Veldenz; 1489–1514	Succeeded by Louis II
