= Peter Gertner =

German painter (c. 1495-c. 1541)

Gertner, Peter
- Born: between 1495 and 1500
- Died: after 1541; Nuremberg
- Notable work: Portraits of Otto Henry and other members of the House of Wittelsbach

Peter Gertner, also known as Gärtner (c. 1495 – after 1541) was a German painter.

== Life ==
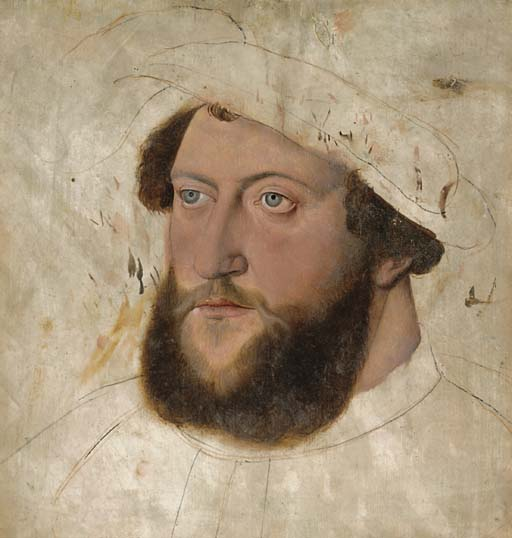
Portrait of Otto Henry, auctioned at Christie's, New York 2006

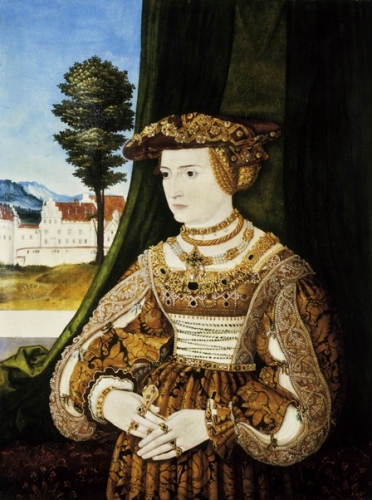
Susanna of Bavaria, Castle museum Berchtesgaden

Peter Gertner received citizenship (burgher rights, Bürgerrecht) of Nuremberg on 12 January 1521, where he presumably learned from the painter Wolf Traut. He became known as a portrait painter and worked for Casimir, Margrave of Brandenburg-Kulmbach in 1527. With Casimir's widow Susanna of Bavaria, after her marriage to Otto Henry, Peter went to the court of Neuburg an der Donau, where he worked as Master Peter, Court Painter (Maister Peter, Hofmaller).

His signature was his monogram pg on a gardener's spade, which is why he is sometimes referred to as "Master PG".

== Selected works ==
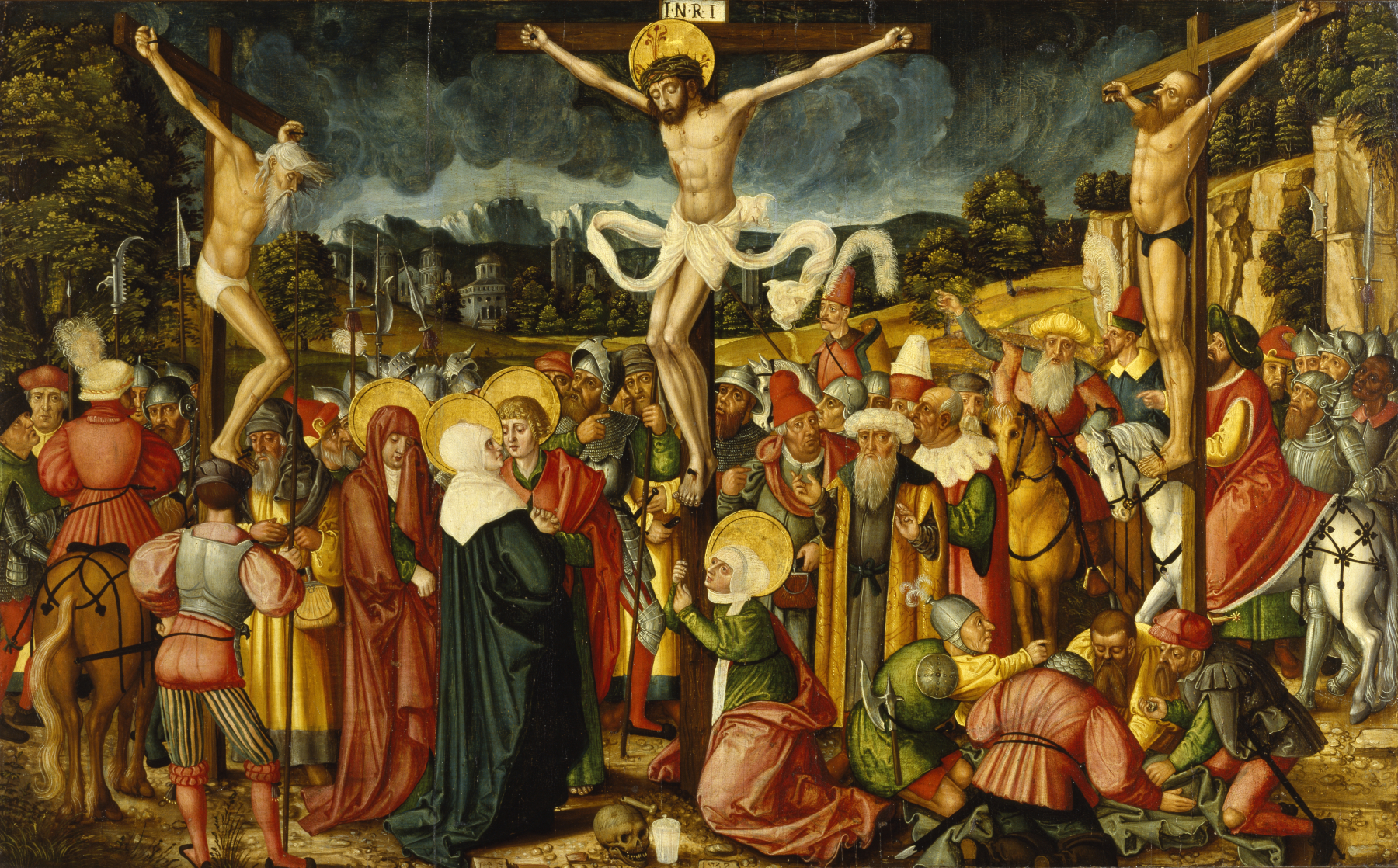
Crucifixion, Walters Art Museum, Baltimore

- Portrait of a man (1523); formerly Kurpfälzisches Museum, Heidelberg, stolen in 1974
- Hans Geyer (1524), North Carolina Museum of Art, Raleigh, North Carolina
- Memorial picture of Margrave Casimir and his wife (lost); copy in St. Kilian's Church, Heilbronn
- Susanna of Bavaria (ca. 1530), castle museum in Berchtesgaden
- Portraits of Otto Henry and other members of the House of Wittelsbach (1531 to 1539), most of them in the Bavarian National Museum, Munich
- Philip the Contentious, painted in front of the view of Vienna besieged by the Turks (1530), Bavarian National Museum
- Crucifixion (1537), Walters Art Museum, Baltimore

== Literature ==
- K. Löcher: Peter Gertner – ein Nürnberger Meister als Hofmaler des Pfalzgrafen Ottheinrich in Neuburg an der Donau. (Neuburger Kollektaneenblatt CXLI) Neuburg an der Donau 1993
