= Kraft VI of Hohenlohe-Weikersheim =

Kraft VI, Count of Hohenlohe-Weikersheim
- Born: c. 1445; Neuenstein
- Died: 2 August 1503; Neuenstein
- Noble family: House of Hohenlohe
- Spouse: Helene of Württemberg
- Father: Kraft V, Count of Hohenlohe-Weikersheim
- Mother: Margaret of Oettingen

Count Kraft VI of Hohenlohe-Weikersheim (c. 1445 in Neuenstein – 2 August 1503 in Neuenstein) was a German nobleman who served as a canon in Mainz and Speyer.

His parents were Kraft V, Count of Hohenlohe-Weikersheim, and Margaret of Oettingen.

== Marriage and issue ==
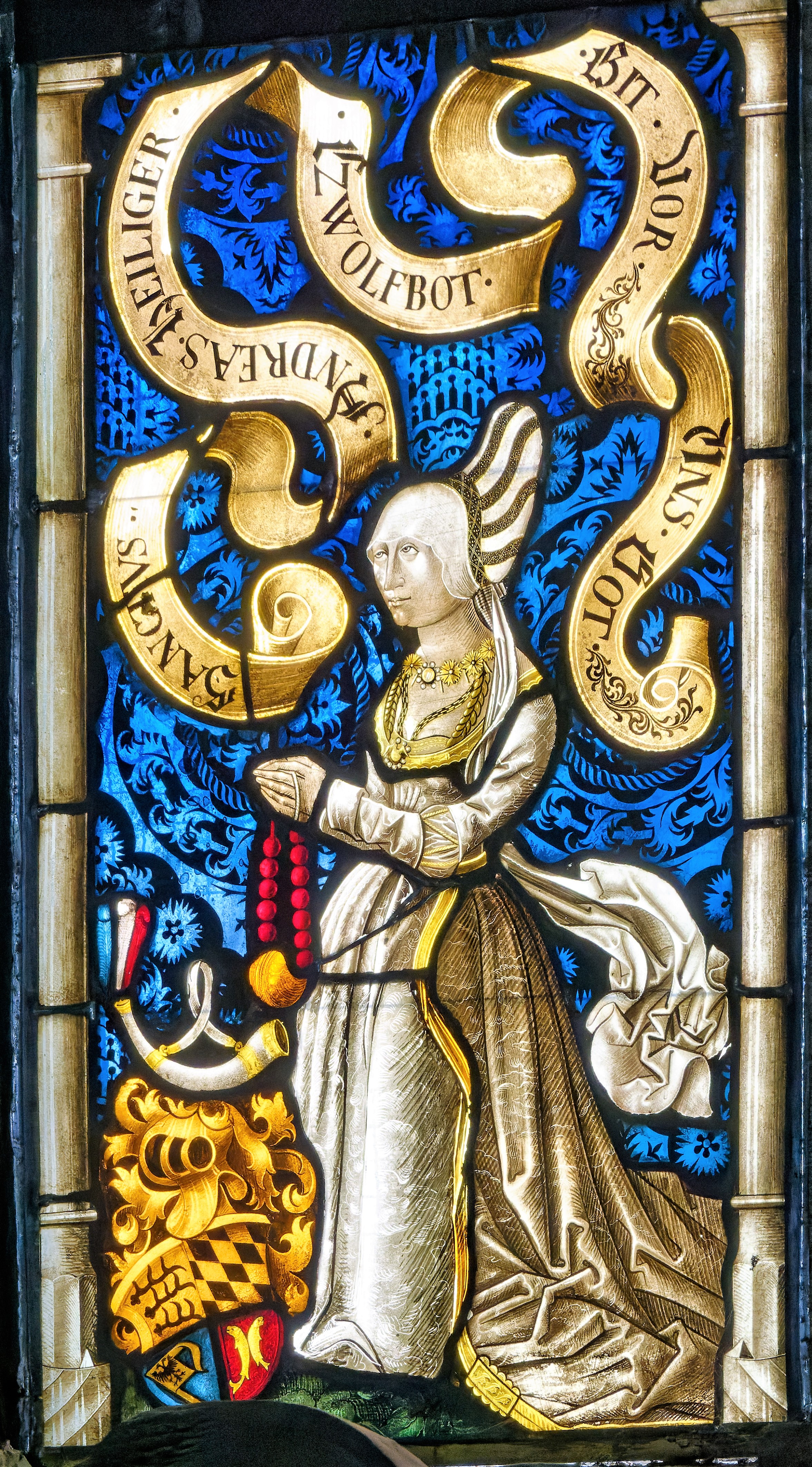
Helena of Württemberg

On 26 February 1476, Kraft VI married Helena of Württemberg (c. 1455 - 19 February 1506), daughter of Ulrich V, Count of Württemberg. Helena brought 8,000 guilders into the marriage as her dowry. With her husband's contribution and the morning gift, she had a fortune that, through interest, led to an annual income of around 1,600 guilders, which enabled her to live a life befitting her status. Through her origins, she contributed significantly to the prestige of the House of Hohenlohe.

Helena was almost always pregnant during their marriage, giving birth to eighteen children in just 24 years, but only eleven lived to mature adulthood:

- Albert III (1478 - 19 August 1551)
- Margaret (30 July 1480 - 3 September 1522)
- Kraft Ulrich (1481 - unknown), died in childhood.
- Helena (4 February 1483 - 31 March 1483), died in infancy.
- Friedrich (19 April 1484 - 1503), a Canon in Mainz and Speyer, died in adolescence.
- Siegmund (9 August 1485 - 8 August 1534), a Canon in Straßburg and Augsburg
- Ludwig (10 November 1486 - 18 November 1550), a Canon in Mainz, Speyer and Straßburg
- George I (17 January 1488 - 16 March 1551)
- Philipp (20 June 1489 - unknown), died in childhood.
- Helena (21 September 1490 - 6 April 1543), a nun at Lichtenstern in 1512. She later became the Abbess at Gnadental.
- Philipp (19 September 1492 - 2 March 1541), killed in a duel.
- Katharina (25 November 1494 - 1536), a nun at Kirchheim am Ries in 1506.
- Elisabeth (24 November 1495 - 1540)
- Klara (27 May 1497 - 13 August 1514), died young. She was a nun at Steinhelm in 1510.
- Johann (27 July 1499 - 1540), who held the office of Treasurer of Kapfenburg between 1527 and 1538.
- Klara Anna (1500 - 1534)
- Christian (1502 - 1502), died in infancy.
- Ulrich (1502 - 1502), died in infancy.
