= Dorothea Sophia, Abbess of Quedlinburg =

Dorothea Sophia
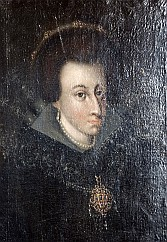

Princess-Abbess of Quedlinburg
- Reign: 21 April 1618 - 10 February 1645
- Predecessor: Dorothea
- Successor: Anna Sophia I
- Born: 19 December 1587; Weimar
- Died: 10 February 1645 (aged 57); Quedlinburg Abbey
- House: Wettin
- Father: Friedrich Wilhelm I, Duke of Saxe-Weimar
- Mother: Sophie of Württemberg
- Religion: Lutheran

Duchess Dorothea Sophia of Saxe-Altenburg (19 December 1587 – 10 February 1645) was Princess-Abbess of Quedlinburg.

She was the fourth child and second daughter of Friedrich Wilhelm I, Duke of Saxe-Weimar, and his first wife, Sophie of Württemberg.

== Reign ==
On 21 April 1618, Dorothea Sophia was elected successor to Princess-Abbess Dorothea. Her election was approved by Matthias, Holy Roman Emperor.

During her reign, Quedlinburg was devastated by the Thirty Years' War. Unlike her predecessors, Princess-Abbess Dorothea Sophia often confronted John George I, Elector of Saxony.

=== Religious policy ===
Dorothea Sophia prohibited her clergy to deny absolution to a person who made a genuine and contrite confession. However, if the same parishioner repeated the sin, they were to face increasingly severe chastisement and, finally, a referral to the consistory. She proscribed that these parishioners would not be able to serve as godparents, nor be buried according to tradition or within consecrated ground. These decisions were a lot like the previous Catholic practice. She also took measures to prevent secret engagements, declaring that every engagement has to be witnessed by three men and publicly announced.

== Ancestry ==
Ancestors of Dorothea Sophia, Abbess of Quedlinburg

16. Johann, Elector of Saxony
8. Johann Friedrich I, Elector of Saxony
17. Sophie of Mecklenburg-Schwerin
4. Johann Wilhelm, Duke of Saxe-Weimar
18. Johann III, Duke of Cleves
9. Sibylle of Cleves
19. Maria of Jülich-Berg
2. Friedrich Wilhelm I, Duke of Saxe-Weimar
20. John II, Count Palatine of Simmern
10. Frederick III, Elector Palatine
21. Beatrix of Baden
5. Dorothea Susanne of Simmern
22. Casimir, Margrave of Brandenburg-Bayreuth
11. Marie of Brandenburg-Kulmbach
23. Susanna of Bavaria
1. Dorothea Sophia, Abbess of Quedlinburg
24. Louis II, Count Palatine of Zweibrücken
12. Wolfgang, Count Palatine of Zweibrücken
25. Elisabeth of Hesse
6. Philipp Ludwig, Count Palatine of Neuburg
26. Philip I, Landgrave of Hesse
13. Anna of Hesse
27. Christine of Saxony
3. Anna Maria of the Palatinate-Neuburg
28. John III, Duke of Cleves (= 18)
14. Wilhelm, Duke of Jülich-Cleves-Berg
29. Maria of Jülich-Berg (= 19)
7. Anna of Cleves
30. Ferdinand I, Holy Roman Emperor
15. Maria of Habsburg, Archduchess of Austria
31. Anna of Bohemia and Hungary

Dorothea Sophia House of Wettin Born: 19 December 1587 Died: 10 February 1645
Regnal titles
Preceded by Dorothea	Princess-Abbess of Quedlinburg; 1618–1645	Succeeded by Anna Sophia I
