= Friedrich Wilhelm I of Saxe-Weimar =

Friedrich Wilhelm I
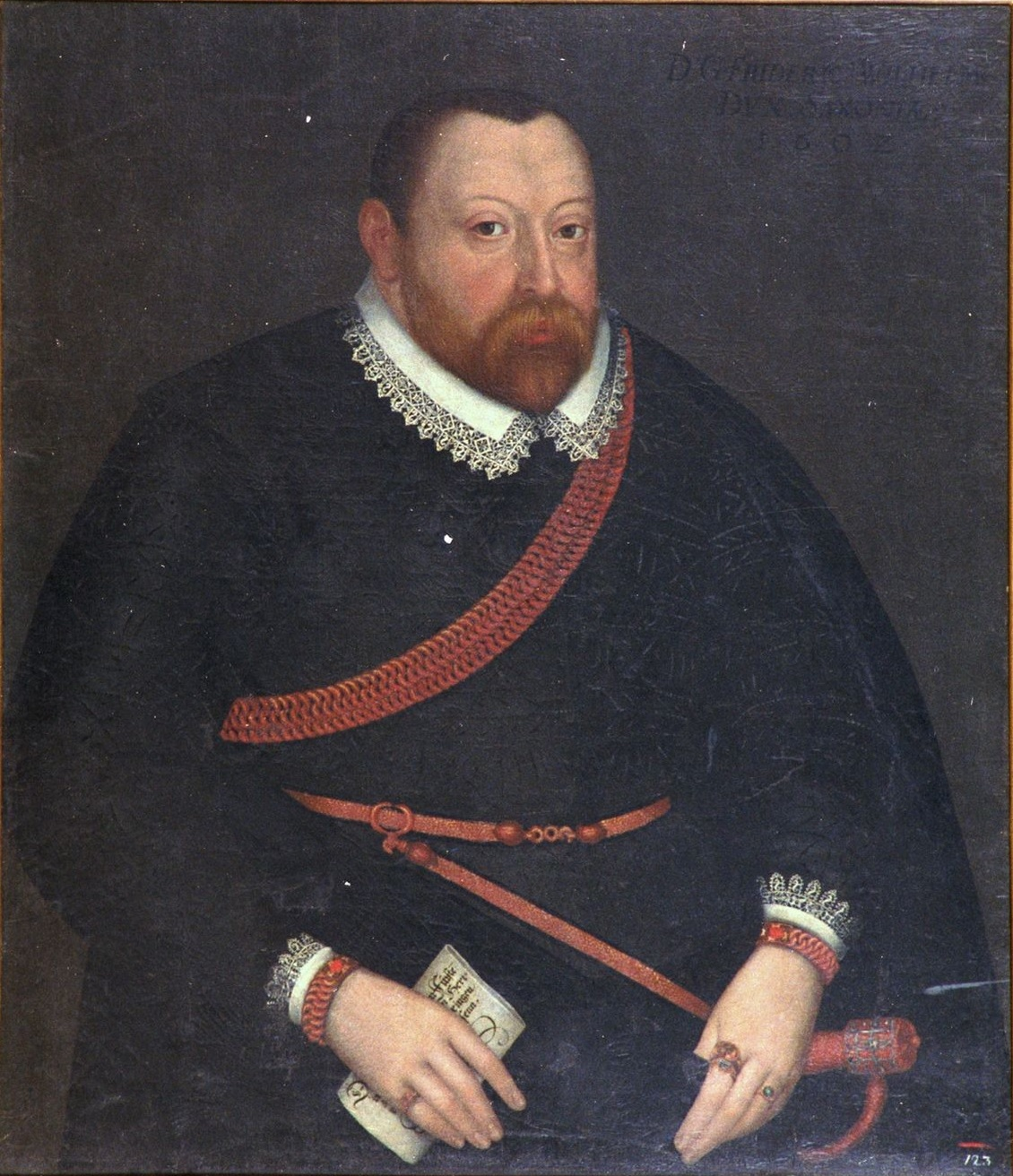

Duke of Saxe-Weimar
- Reign: 2 March 1573 – 7 July 1602
- Predecessor: Johann Wilhelm
- Successor: Johann II
- Regent: Elector Augustus
- Born: 25 April 1562; Weimar
- Died: 7 July 1602 (aged 40); Weimar
- Spouse: Sophie of Württemberg; Anna Maria of the Palatinate-Neuburg
- Issue among others...: Dorothea Sophia, Princess-Abbess of Quedlinburg; Johann Philipp, Duke of Saxe-Altenburg; Friedrich, Duke of Saxe-Altenburg; Johann Wilhelm, Duke of Saxe-Altenburg; Dorothea, Duchess of Saxe-Eisenach; Friedrich Wilhelm II, Duke of Saxe-Altenburg
- House: Wettin (Ernestine line)
- Father: Johann Wilhelm, Duke of Saxe-Weimar
- Mother: Dorothea Susanne of Simmern
- Religion: Lutheran

Friedrich Wilhelm I (25 April 1562 in Weimar – 7 July 1602 in Weimar) was a duke of Saxe-Weimar. He was the eldest son of Johann Wilhelm, Duke of Saxe-Weimar and Dorothea Susanne of Simmern.

== Life ==
At the time of the death of his father in 1573, Friedrich Wilhelm was still under age; for this, a tutelary government for the duchy was appointed. The Dowager Duchess, Dorothea Susanne, could however not prevent the Elector Augustus of Saxony – from the Albertine line – from being designated as the regent in her place.

In 1586, Friedrich Wilhelm was declared an adult and began his independent government over in Saxe-Weimar. Five years later, in 1591, the Elector Christian I of Saxony died and was succeeded by his eldest son Christian II. Because the new Elector was still under age, the regency of the Electorate was assigned to Sophie of Brandenburg, widow of Christian I and mother of the heir. While she became regent, Friedrich Wilhelm was asked to assist and given the title of Administrator des Sächsischen Kurstaates (Administrator of the Saxon Electorate). He took residence in Torgau, and neglected the government of his duchy (which was instead led by his younger brother John, who had to take part – in accordance with the Ernestine House Law – anyway in the government).

In 1601, Sophie's regency in the Electorate of Saxony ended with the majority of Elector Christian II, and Friedrich Wilhelm returned to Weimar. Since he died one year later, he did not leave large traces in the history of the duchy.

== Marriage and children ==
In Weimar on 5 May 1583 Friedrich Wilhelm married firstly with Sophie, daughter of Christoph, Duke of Württemberg. They had six children:

1. Dorothea Marie (b. Weimar, 8 May 1584 – d. Weimar, 9 September 1586) died in early childhood.
2. Johann Wilhelm, Hereditary Prince of Saxe-Weimar (b. Weimar, 30 June 1585 – d. Weimar, 23 January 1587) died in early childhood.
3. Friedrich (b. Weimar, 26 September 1586 – d. Weimar, 19 January 1587) died in early childhood.
4. Dorothea Sophia (b. Weimar, 19 December 1587 – d. Weimar, 10 February 1645), Princess-Abbess of Quedlinburg (1618)
5. Anna Marie (b. Weimar, 31 March 1589 – d. Dresden, 15 December 1626) died unmarried and without issue.
6. stillborn son (Vacha, 21 July 1590).

In Neuburg an der Donau on 9 September 1591 Friedrich Wilhelm married secondly with Anna Maria, daughter of Philipp Ludwig, Count Palatine of Neuburg. They had six children:

1. Johann Philipp, Duke of Saxe-Altenburg (b. Torgau, 25 January 1597 – d. Altenburg, 1 April 1639)
2. Anna Sophie (b. Torgau, 3 February 1598 – d. Öls, 20 March 1641), married on 4 December 1618 to Duke Karl Friedrich of Münsterberg-Öls.
3. Friedrich, Duke of Saxe-Altenburg (b. Torgau, 12 February 1599 – killed in battle, 24 October 1625)
4. Johann Wilhelm, Duke of Saxe-Altenburg (1600–1632) (b. Torgau, 13 April 1600 – d. army camp outside Brieg, 2 December 1632)
5. Dorothea (b. Torgau, 26 June 1601 – d. Altenburg, 10 April 1675), married on 24 June 1633 to Albrecht, Duke of Saxe-Eisenach.
6. Friedrich Wilhelm II, Duke of Saxe-Altenburg (b. posthumously, Weimar, 12 February 1603 – d. Altenburg, 22 April 1669)

== Ancestry ==
Ancestors of Friedrich Wilhelm I of Saxe-Weimar

16. Ernst, Elector of Saxony
8. Johann, Elector of Saxony
17. Elisabeth of Bavaria-Munich
4. Johann Friedrich I, Elector of Saxony
18. Magnus II, Duke of Mecklenburg-Schwerin and Güstrow
9. Sophie of Mecklenburg-Schwerin
19. Sophie of Pomerania-Wolgast
2. Johann Wilhelm, Duke of Saxe-Weimar
20. John II, Duke of Cleves
10. John III, Duke of Cleves
21. Mathilde of Hesse
5. Sybille of Cleves
22. William IV, Duke of Jülich-Berg
11. Maria of Jülich-Berg
23. Sibylle of Brandenburg
1. Friedrich Wilhelm I, Duke of Saxe-Weimar
24. John I of Pfalz-Simmern
12. John II of Pfalz-Simmern
25. Joanna of Nassau-Saarbrücken
6. Frederick III, Elector Palatine
26. Christoph I, Margrave of Baden-Baden
13. Beatrice of Baden
27. Ottilie von Katzenelnbogen
3. Dorothea Susanne of Simmern
28. Frederick I, Margrave of Brandenburg-Ansbach
14. Casimir, Margrave of Brandenburg-Bayreuth
29. Sophia of Poland
7. Marie of Brandenburg-Kulmbach
30. Albert IV, Duke of Bavaria
15. Susanna of Bavaria
31. Kunigunde of Austria

Regnal titles
Preceded by Johann Wilhelm	Duke of Saxe-Weimar; 1573–1602	Succeeded by Johann II
