= Frederick IV, Elector Palatine =

Elector Palatine from 1583 to 1610

Frederick IV
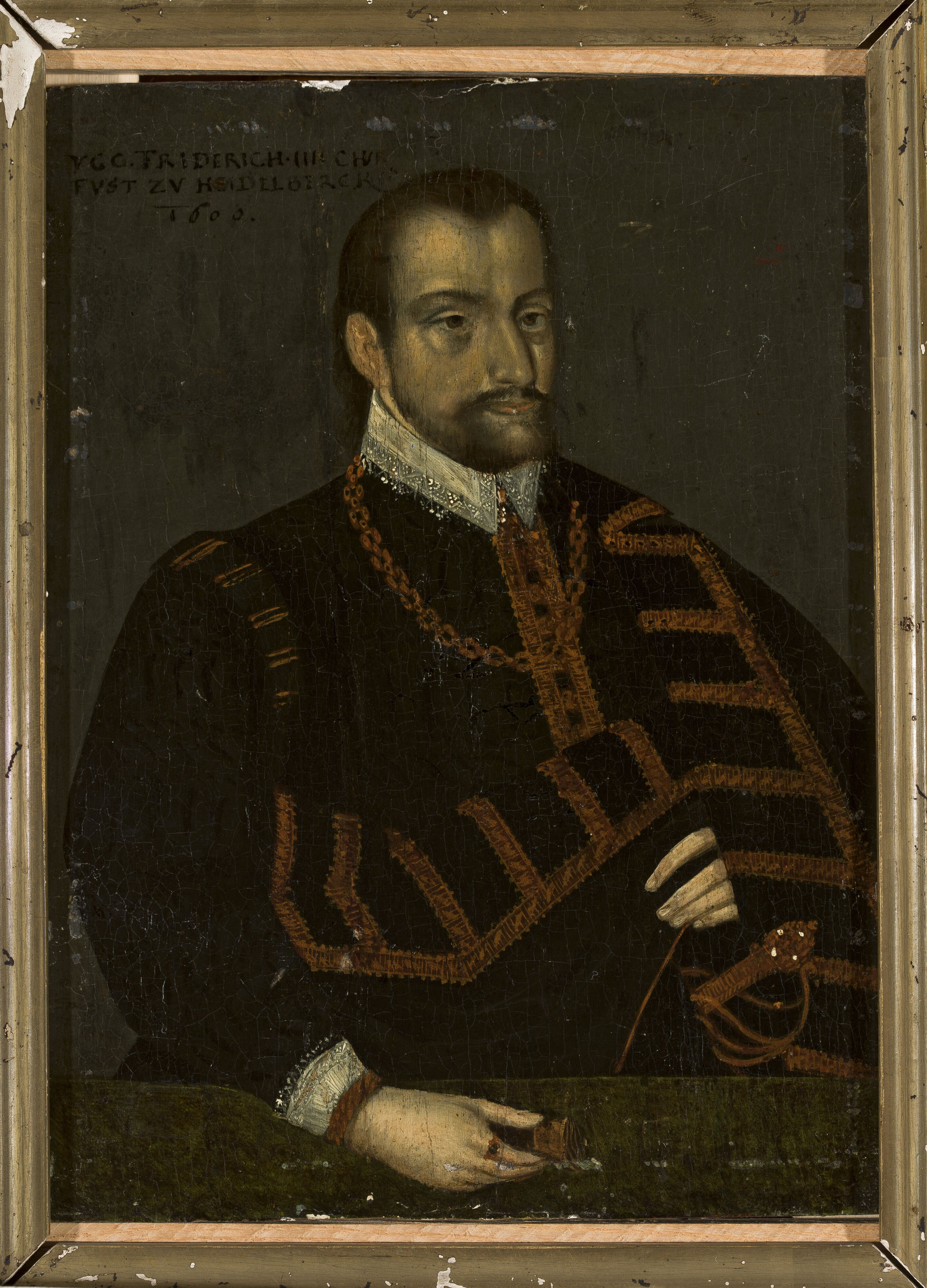
- Portrait, 1600

Elector Palatine
- Reign: 22 October 1583 – 19 September 1610
- Predecessor: Louis VI
- Successor: Frederick V
- Born: 5 March 1574; Amberg
- Died: 19 September 1610 (aged 36); Heidelberg, Electorate of the Palatinate, Holy Roman Empire
- Spouse: Louise Juliana of Nassau (m. 1593)
- Issue: Luise Juliane, Countess Palatine of Zweibrücken; Katharina Sofie; Frederick V, Elector Palatine; Elisabeth Charlotte, Electress of Brandenburg; Anna Eleonore; Louis William; Maurice Christian; Louis Philip, Count Palatine of Simmern-Kaiserslautern
- House: Wittelsbach; Palatinate-Simmern
- Father: Louis VI, Elector Palatine
- Mother: Elisabeth of Hesse
- Religion: Calvinism

Frederick IV, Elector Palatine of the Rhine (German: Friedrich IV.; 5 March 1574 – 19 September 1610), only surviving son of Louis VI, Elector Palatine and Elisabeth of Hesse, called "Frederick the Righteous" (German: Friedrich Der Aufrichtige; French: Frédéric IV le juste).

== Life ==
Frederick was born in Amberg. His father died in October 1583 and Frederick came under the guardianship of his uncle, John Casimir, an ardent Calvinist, who ruled as regent until his death. The Calvinist mathematician and astronomer Bartholemaeus Pitiscus served as Frederick's tutor and later became court preacher.

In January 1592, John Casimir died and the 17-year-old Frederick assumed control of the government of the Electorate of the Palatinate. Frederick continued John Casimir's anti-Catholic measures and in 1608 became the head of the Protestant military alliance known as the Protestant Union. In this capacity, he supported Protestant interests in the War of the Julich Succession. He developed alcoholism, leaving state matters largely to his chief minister Christian of Anhalt. Frederick IV died in 1610 in Heidelberg.

== Family and children ==
In 1593, Frederick married Louise Juliana of Nassau, the daughter of William I of Orange and Charlotte de Bourbon-Monpensier. They had eight children:

- Luise Juliane of the Palatinate (Heidelberg, 16 July 1594 - Meisenheim, 28 April 1640), married in 1612 to Pfalzgraf John II, Count Palatine of Zweibrücken.
- Katharina Sofie of the Palatinate (Heidelberg, 10 June 1595 - Köln an der Spree, 28 June 1626).
- Frederick V, Elector Palatine (Jagdschloß Deinschwang, 16 August 1596 - Mainz, 29 November 1632); married in 1613 Princess Elizabeth of Scotland and England (later Queen of Bohemia).
- Elisabeth Charlotte of the Palatinate (Neumarkt, 19 November 1597 - Crossen an der Oder, 26 April 1660); married in 1616 to Elector George William of Brandenburg
- Anna Eleonore of the Palatinate (Heidelberg, 4 January 1599 - Heidelberg, 10 October 1600).
- Louis William of the Palatinate (Heidelberg, 5 August 1600 - Heidelberg, 10 October 1600).
- Maurice Christian of the Palatinate (Heidelberg, 18 September 1601 - Heidelberg, 28 March 1605).
- Louis Philip, Count Palatine of Simmern-Kaiserslautern (Heidelberg, 23 November 1602 - Krossen, 6 January 1655).

== Ancestors ==
Ancestors of Frederick IV, Elector Palatine

16. John I, Count Palatine of Simmern
8. John II, Count Palatine of Simmern
17. Joanna of Nassau-Saarbrücken
4. Frederick III, Elector Palatine
18. Christopher I of Baden-Baden
9. Beatrix of Baden
19. Ottilie of Katzenelnbogen
2. Louis VI, Elector Palatine
20. Frederick I of Brandenburg-Ansbach
10. Casimir, Margrave of Brandenburg-Bayreuth
21. Sophia Jagiellon
5. Marie of Brandenburg-Kulmbach
22. Albert IV, Duke of Bavaria
11. Susanna of Bavaria
23. Kunigunde of Austria
1. Frederick IV, Elector Palatine
24. Louis II, Landgrave of Hesse
12. William II, Landgrave of Hesse
25. Mathilde of Württemberg-Urach
6. Philip I, Landgrave of Hesse
26. Magnus II, Duke of Mecklenburg
13. Anna of Mecklenburg-Schwerin
27. Sophie of Pomerania-Stettin
3. Elisabeth of Hesse
28. Albert, Duke of Saxony
14. George, Duke of Saxony
29. Sidonie of Poděbrady
7. Christine of Saxony
30. Casimir IV Jagiellon
15. Barbara Jagiellon
31. Elizabeth of Austria

== Sources ==
- Parker, Geoffrey (1997). The Thirty Years' War (2nd ed.). Routledge.
- Thomas, Andrew L. (2010). A House Divided: Wittelsbach Confessional Court Cultures in the Holy Roman Empire, c. 1550-1650. Brill.

Frederick IV, Elector Palatine House of Palatinate-Simmern Cadet branch of the House of Wittelsbach Born: 5 March 1574 Died: 19 September 1610
Regnal titles
Preceded by Louis VI	Elector Palatine; 1583–1610	Succeeded by Frederick V
