= Johann Philipp, Duke of Saxe-Altenburg =

Johann Philipp
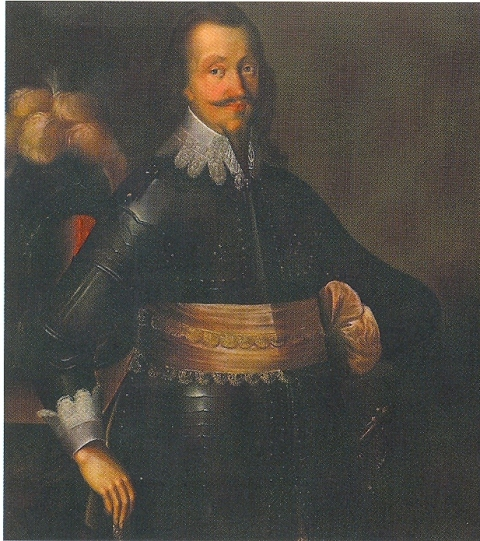
- Portrait c. 1630

Duke of Saxe-Altenburg
- Reign: 1603–1639
- Predecessor: Johann
- Successor: Friedrich Wilhelm II
- Born: 25 January 1597; Torgau
- Died: 1 April 1639 (aged 42); Altenburg
- Spouse: Elisabeth of Brunswick-Wolfenbüttel (m. 1618)
- Issue: Elisabeth Sophie, Duchess of Saxe-Gotha-Altenburg
- House: House of Wettin
- Father: Friedrich Wilhelm I, Duke of Saxe-Weimar
- Mother: Anna Maria of the Palatinate-Neuburg
- Religion: Lutheran

Johann Philipp (25 January 1597 – 1 April 1639) was a duke of Saxe-Altenburg.

He was born in Torgau, the eldest (but fourth in order of birth) surviving son of Friedrich Wilhelm I, Duke of Saxe-Weimar and Anna Maria of the Palatinate-Neuburg, his second wife.

== Childhood ==
When his father died in 1602, Johann Philipp and his younger brothers Frederick, Johann Wilhelm and Friedrich Wilhelm were underage. Because of this, his uncle Johann (more interested in natural sciences and art than politics) took over his guardianship and the regency of his inheritance, but shortly after, he took the entire duchy of Saxe-Weimar into his own hands.

The next year (1603), the young prince of Saxe-Weimar demanded his own inheritance, but his uncle Johann opposed this. But finally, both parts made a divisionary treaty of the family lands: Johann Philipp and his brothers took Altenburg and some towns, and Johann retained Weimar and Jena.

Because they were still underage, the regency of his duchy was taken by Christian II, Elector of Saxony (1603–1611) and later by his brother and next Elector, John George I (1611–1618).

== Adulthood ==
In 1618, Johann Philipp, as the elder son, was declared an adult and assumed the government of the duchy of Saxe-Altenburg. Also, he took over the guardianship of his younger siblings. The four brothers co-ruled the duchy, but two of them died childless soon after: Frederick, who was killed in action in 1625, and Johann Wilhelm, who died in Brieg in 1632.

Johann Philipp and his only surviving brother, Friedrich Wilhelm II, continued as co-rulers; but, in fact, it was Johann Philipp who really assumed the supreme and full control of the government until his death.

In 1613, Johann Philipp was appointed Dean of the University of Leipzig. Also, he was an active member of the Fruitbearing Society.

In 1638, he received the towns of Coburg, Bad Rodach, Römhild, Hildburghausen and Neustadt, according to the divisionary treaty between him and the branch of Saxe-Weimar after the death of the duke John Ernest of Saxe-Eisenach without surviving issue.

Before his death, he made a will in which he declared his daughter the general heiress of the branch of Saxe-Altenburg, only in case of extinction of the male issue of the family. This would later originate a dispute between the branches of Saxe-Gotha and Saxe-Weimar.

Johann Philipp died in Altenburg and was succeeded by his younger and only surviving brother, Frederick William II.

== Marriage and issue ==
In Altenburg on 25 October 1618 Johann Philipp married Elisabeth of Brunswick-Wolfenbüttel (dowager sister-in-law of his former regents, the Electors of Saxony Christian II and Johann Georg I). They had only one child, a daughter:

1. Elisabeth Sophie (b. Halle, 10 October 1619 - d. Gotha, 20 December 1680), married on 24 October 1636 to Ernest I, Duke of Saxe-Gotha.

== Ancestry ==
Ancestors of Johann Philipp, Duke of Saxe-Altenburg

8. Johann Friedrich I, Elector of Saxony
4. Johann Wilhelm, Duke of Saxe-Weimar
9. Sibylle of Cleves(sister of #14)
2. Friedrich Wilhelm I, Duke of Saxe-Weimar
10. Frederick III, Elector Palatine
5. Dorothea Susanne of Simmern
11. Marie of Brandenburg-Kulmbach
1. Johann Philipp, Duke of Saxe-Altenburg
12. Wolfgang, Count Palatine of Zweibrücken
6. Philipp Ludwig, Count Palatine of Neuburg
13. Anna of Hesse
3. Anna Maria of the Palatinate-Neuburg
14. Wilhelm, Duke of Jülich-Cleves-Berg
7. Anna of Cleves
15. Maria of Austria

Preceded by Johann II	Duke of Saxe-Altenburg; 1603–1639	Succeeded by Friedrich Wilhelm II
