= Duke Johann Wilhelm of Saxe-Altenburg =

Duke John William of Saxe-Altenburg
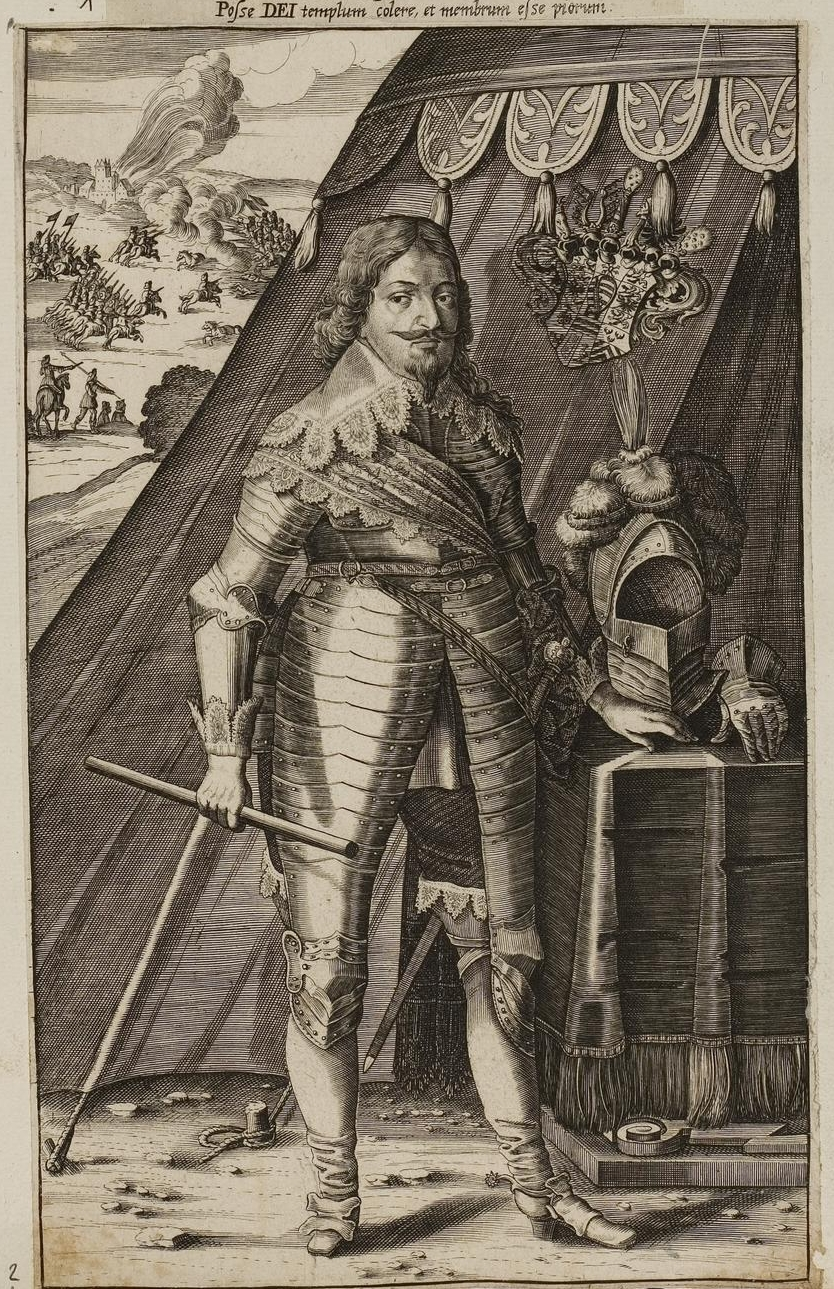
- 17th-century engraving
- Born: 13 April 1600; Torgau
- Died: 2 December 1632 (aged 32) army camp outside Brzeg
- Burial: St. Sophia Church in Dresden
Names
- Johann Wilhelm of Saxe-Altenburg
- House: House of Wettin
- Father: Friedrich Wilhelm I, Duke of Saxe-Weimar
- Mother: Countess Palatine Anna Maria of Neuburg

Duke Johann Wilhelm of Saxe-Altenburg (13 April 1600 – 2 December 1632) was a member of the Ernestine branch of the House of Wettin and a titular Duke of Saxe-Altenburg and Jülich-Cleves-Berg.

== Life ==
Johann Wilhelm was the second son of Duke Friedrich Wilhelm I of Saxe-Weimar from his second marriage to Anna Maria, daughter of Philipp Ludwig, Count Palatine of Neuburg.

After the death of his father Johann Wilhelm inherited the Duchy of Saxe-Altenburg jointly with his brothers Johann Philipp, Friedrich and Friedrich Wilhelm II. Initially, the guardianship of the princes was taken up by the Elector of Saxony and their uncle John II. After John II died in 1605, the Elector was their sole guardian.

After the War of the Jülich Succession, the brothers had been invested with Jülich, Cleves and Berg. However, they were only nominally Dukes and took the coat of arms. In 1612, the brothers went to the University of Leipzig to complete their education. In 1618, the eldest brother Johann Philipp came of age and began to rule independently. The younger brothers agreed that he would rule alone, in exchange for a financial compensation. Initially, the agreement was for a limited number of years. In 1624, however, it was extended indefinitely. Johann Wilhelm made his Grand Tour to Italy, Holland, France, England and Hungary together with his brother Frederick William.

In the Thirty Years' War Johann Wilhelm served as a colonel in the Saxon army. In 1632, he died of a fever in an army camp outside Brzeg. He was buried in the St. Sophia Church in Dresden.
