= Dorothea of Saxe-Altenburg =

Duchess of Saxe-Altenburg and Saxe-Eisenach

- Coat-of-arms of the House of Wettin, rulers in Saxony.
- Born: 26 June 1601; Torgau
- Died: 10 April 1675 (aged 73); Altenburg
- Spouse: Albert, Duke of Saxe-Eisenach
- House: House of Wettin
- Father: Frederick William I, Duke of Saxe-Weimar
- Mother: Countess Palatine Anna Maria of Neuburg

Dorothea of Saxe-Altenburg (26 June 1601 in Torgau – 10 April 1675 in Altenburg), was a princess from the House of Wettin by birth and by marriage Duchess of Saxe-Eisenach.

== Life ==
Dorothy was a daughter of the Duke Frederick William I of Saxe-Weimar (1562-1602) from his second marriage with Anna Maria (1575-1643), the daughter of Duke Philip Louis of Neuburg. She was born in Torgau, where her father ruled as regent of the Electorate of Saxony. She was raised mostly at Lichtenburg Castle by Electress dowager Hedwig of Saxony. From 1620, she was a member of the Virtuous Society under the nickname die Freudige ("the Joyful").

On 11 May 1628, Dorothea was appointed coadjutor of Quedlinburg Abbey by her older sister Dorothea Sophie, who was abbess of the Abbey, a post their aunt, Maria, had held before 1610.

In 1633, Dorothea left the Abbey and on 24 June she married in Weimar with her first cousin Duke Albert IV of Saxe-Eisenach (1599-1644). She survived her husband by 31 years. The marriage remained childless.
