= Duke Friedrich of Saxe-Altenburg =

Third son of Duke Friedrich Wilhelm I of Saxe-Weimar

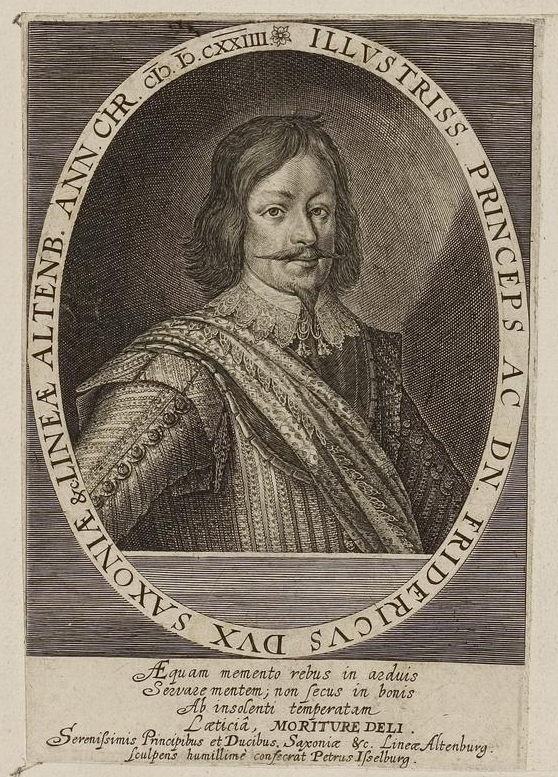
- Born: 12 February 1599; Torgau
- Died: 24 October 1625 (aged 26); Seelze
- Burial: Hanover, later Altenburg
Names
- Friedrich of Saxe-Altenburg
- House: Wettin
- Father: Friedrich Wilhelm I, Duke of Saxe-Weimar
- Mother: Countess Palatine Anna Maria of Neuburg

Friedrich of Saxe-Altenburg (12 February 1599 – 24 October 1625) was a member of the Ernestine branch of the House of Wettin and a Duke of Saxe-Altenburg and Duke of Jülich-Cleves-Berg. Friedrich is sometimes called "Friedrich the younger" to distinguish him from Prince Frederick of Saxe-Weimar, as they were both called "Friedrich of Saxe-Weimar".

== Life ==
Frederick was the second son of Duke Friedrich Wilhelm I of Saxe-Weimar from his second marriage to Anna Maria, daughter of Philipp Ludwig, Count Palatine of Neuburg.

After the death of his father Frederick inherited the Duchy of Saxe-Altenburg jointly with his brothers Johann Philipp, Johann Wilhelm and Friedrich Wilhelm II. Their guardians were the Elector Christian II of Saxony and their uncle, Duke Johann II. After John II died in 1605, Christian II was their sole guardian.

After the War of the Jülich Succession, the brothers were enfeoffed with the Duchies of Jülich, Cleves and Berg. However, they were still minors and were only allowed to use the title and the coat of arms. In 1612, the brothers enrolled at the University of Leipzig to complete their education. Frederick and John Philip participated in the Princess Congress at Naumburg in 1614, where the inheritance alliance between Brandenburg, Hesse and Saxony was created.

In 1618, the oldest brother Johann Philipp came of age and began to rule independently. The younger brothers decided to allow John Philip to continue to rule alone, when they came of age, in exchange for a jointure. At first, this was agreed for a limited number of years. In 1624, however, the arrangement was made permanent.

Friedrich went into the service of the Elector John George I of Saxony and fought in the Thirty Years' War in Lusatia and Bohemia. From 1622, he led his own corps of troops, however, these scattered due to lack of pay. Frederick then went into the service of Duke Christian the Younger of Brunswick-Wolfenbüttel. During the Battle of Stadtlohn of 1623, Friedrich and William, Duke of Saxe-Weimar were captured by Tilly, who surrendered the Dukes to the Emperor. Friedrich remained imprisoned for a while. In 1624, John George I intervened and he was released.

In 1625 Friedrich became a cavalry commander in Danish service. With his regiment he formed a Danish outpost in Seelze. They were attacked by Tilly and he died of a head wound. Hans Michael Elias von Obentraut died during the same skirmish. Frederick's body was first interred in Hanover and later moved the Brothers' Church in Altenburg. He died unmarried and without heirs.

== References and sources ==
- Johann Samuel Ersch: Allgemeine Encyclopädie der Wissenschaften und Künste, Leipzig 1849, p. 64 ff (Digitized)
