= Kunigunde of Brandenburg-Kulmbach =

Margravine of Baden-Durlach (1524–1558)

- Born: 1524; Ansbach
- Died: 27 February 1558; Pforzheim
- Noble family: House of Hohenzollern
- Spouse: Charles II, Margrave of Baden-Durlach
- Father: Casimir, Margrave of Brandenburg-Bayreuth
- Mother: Susanna of Bavaria

Kunigunde of Brandenburg-Kulmbach (1524 in Ansbach – 27 February 1558 in Pforzheim) was a princess of Brandenburg-Kulmbach by birth and by marriage Margravine of Baden-Durlach.

== Life ==
Kunigunde was the youngest child of the Margrave Casimir of Brandenburg-Kulmbach (1481–1527) from his marriage to Susanne (1502–1543), daughter of the Duke Albert IV of Bavaria.

She married on 10 March 1551 in Neustadt an der Aisch with Margrave Charles II of Baden-Durlach (1529–1577). Kunigunde had been raised in the Lutheran faith, while her husband belonged to the Catholic church. Under the influence of his wife, Charles began to turn to the Reformation.

When an imperial ban had been pronounced over her brother Albrecht II Alcibiades in 1554, Kunigunde took him into her residence in Pforzheim, where he died in 1557, a year before her death. They were both prominent spa guests at the mineral springs of Bad Liebenzell.

She died in 1558 and was buried in the St. Michael Church in Pforzheim, where a cenotaph of the margravine can be found in the choir.

Baden came via her into the possession of the precious prayer book Gebetbuch der Markgräfin von Brandenburg, which Narziss Renner had created for her mother in 1520. It is now in the Baden State Library.

== Issue ==
Kunigunde and Charles had two children:

- Marie (1553–1561)
- Albert (1555–1574)
