= Sophie of Württemberg, Duchess of Saxe-Weimar =

Duchess consort of Saxe-Weimar (1563–1590)

Sophie of Württemberg
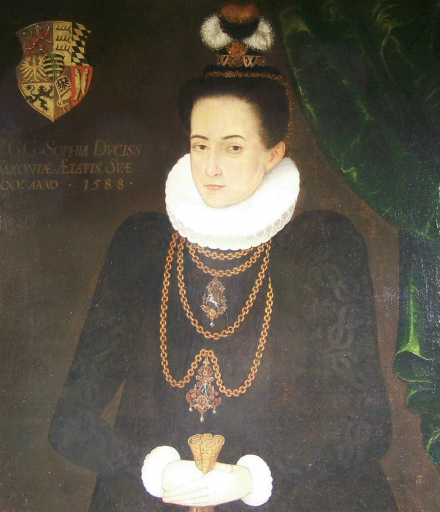

Duchess consort of Saxe-Weimar
- Tenure: 1583-1590
- Born: 20 November 1563; Stuttgart
- Died: 21 July 1590 (aged 26); Vacha
- Spouse: Frederick William I, Duke of Saxe-Weimar (m. 1583)
- Issue: Dorothea Sophia, Abbess of Quedlinburg; Princess Anna Marie
- House: House of Württemberg
- Father: Christoph, Duke of Württemberg
- Mother: Anna Maria of Brandenburg-Ansbach

Sophie of Württemberg (20 November 1563 – 21 July 1590), was a German noblewoman member of the House of Württemberg and by marriage Duchess of Saxe-Weimar.

Born in Stuttgart, she was the youngest of twelve children born from the marriage of Christoph, Duke of Württemberg and Anna Maria of Brandenburg-Ansbach. From her eleven older siblings, nine survive adulthood: Eberhard, Hereditary Prince of Württemberg, Hedwig (by marriage Landgravine of Hesse-Marburg), Elisabeth (by her two marriages Countess of Henneberg-Schleusingen and Countess Palatine of Veldenz-Lauterecken), Sabine (by marriage Landgravine of Hesse-Kassel), Emilie (by marriage Countess Palatine of Simmern-Sponheim), Eleonore (by her two marriages Princess of Anhalt and Landgravine of Hesse-Darmstadt), Louis III, Duke of Württemberg, Dorothea Maria (by marriage Countess Palatine of Sulzbach) and Anna (by her two marriages Duchess of Oława and Legnica).

== Life ==
On 5 May 1583 Sophie married Frederick William I, Duke of Saxe-Weimar. They had six children, of whom only two survived to adulthood:

1. Dorothea Marie (Weimar, 8 May 1584 – Weimar, 9 September 1586).
2. John William, Hereditary Prince of Saxe-Weimar (Weimar, 30 June 1585 – Weimar, 23 January 1587).
3. Frederick (Weimar, 26 September 1586 – Weimar, 19 January 1587).
4. Dorothea Sophia (Weimar, 19 December 1587 – Weimar, 10 February 1645), Princess-Abbess of Quedlinburg (1618).
5. Anna Marie (Weimar, 31 March 1589 – Dresden, 15 December 1626).
6. stillborn son (Vacha, 21 July 1590).

Sophie died on 21 July 1590, following complications of her last childbirth. She was buried in the Stadtkirche St. Peter und Paul, Weimar.

Sophie of Württemberg, Duchess of Saxe-Weimar House of Württemberg Born: 20 November 1563 Died: 21 July 1590
German royalty
Vacant Title last held by Dorothea Susanne of the Palatinate	Duchess consort of Saxe-Weimar; 1583–1590	Vacant Title next held by Anna Maria of the Palatinate-Neuburg
