= Maria of the Palatinate, Duchess of Södermanland =

Princess Maria
- Duchess of Södermanland
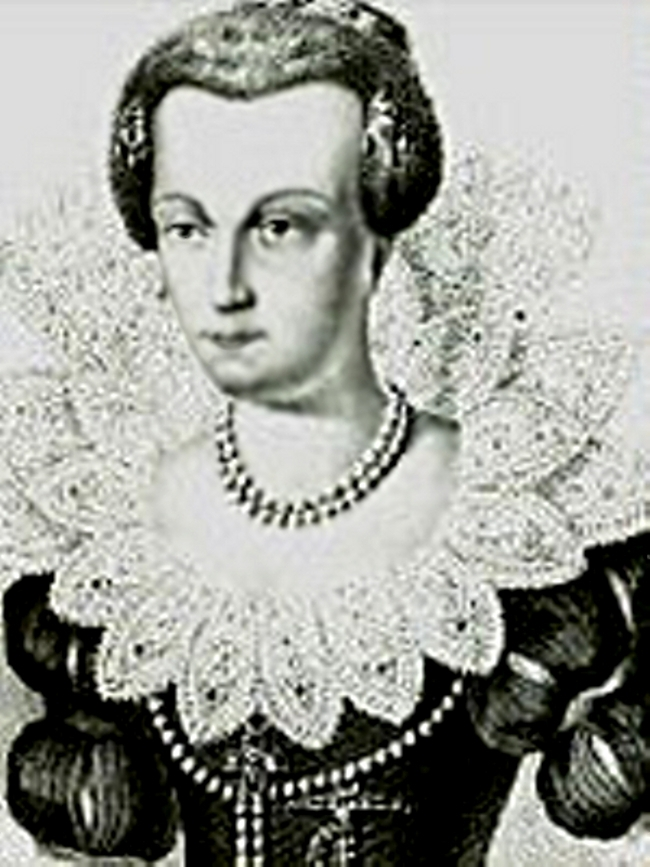
- Born: 24 July 1561; Heidelberg, Germany
- Died: 29 July 1589 (aged 28); Eskilstuna, Sweden
- Spouse: Prince Charles, Duke of Södermanland (m. 1579)
- Issue: Princess Margareta; Princess Elisabeth; Prince Louis; Catherine, Countess Palatine of Kleeburg; Prince Gustav; Princess Maria
- House: Wittelsbach
- Father: Louis VI, Elector Palatine
- Mother: Elisabeth of Hesse

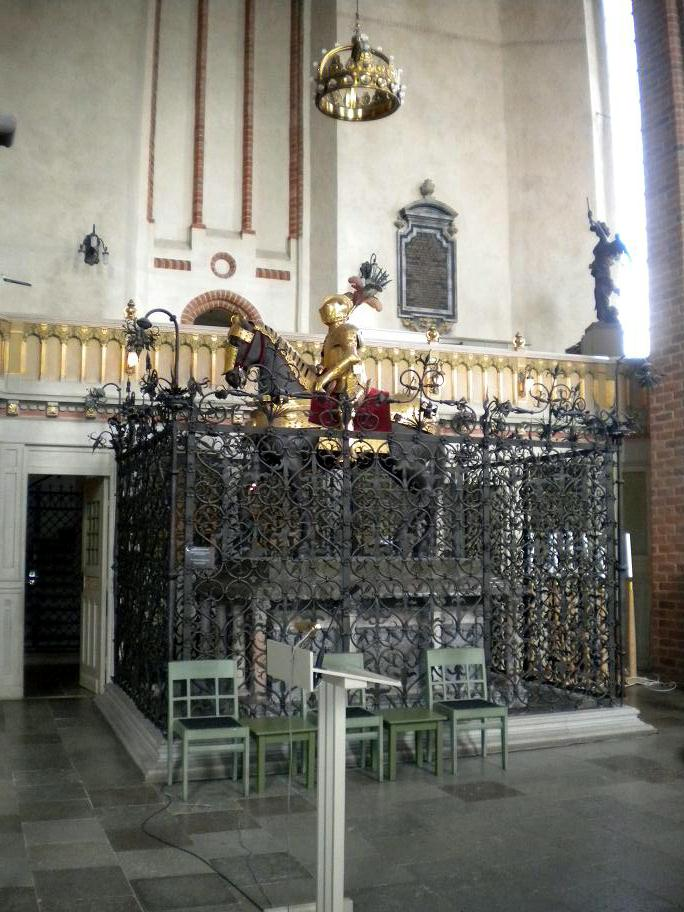
Princess Maria and her branch of the Vasa Dynasty were interred in Strängnäs Cathedral.

Maria of the Palatinate (24 July 1561 – 29 July 1589), also known as Anna Maria, was a Swedish princess and Duchess of Södermanland by marriage, the first wife of the future King Charles IX of Sweden. She died before he became king.

== Biography ==
Maria was born in Heidelberg, to Louis VI, Elector Palatine and Elisabeth of Hesse. In April 1578, the Swedish Prince Charles, Duke of Södermanland, visited her home town Heidelberg and proposed. Maria was brought up to be an ardent Lutheran, and her religion and upbringing according to the principles of the Augsburg Confession was one reason why she was chosen by the sternly Protestant Charles. She also spoke Latin. Her father accepted the marriage proposal on the condition that she be secured the right to practice her faith in Sweden which was then ruled by Charles' brother John III, who was known for his Catholic sympathies. The wedding took place in Heidelberg 11 May 1579. Afterwards, she followed him to Sweden, where they resided in his Duchy in Södermanland. They left Germany in July, and in September 1579, Maria received the oath of loyalty from the subjects in her dower lands Gripsholm, Tynnelsö and Rävsnäs estates, Strängnäs city with the parishes Åkers, Selebo and Daga as well as Överenhörna and Ytterenhörna.

She is described as beautiful, gentle and diplomatic, but also sickly. Her marriage to Charles IX of Sweden is described as happy. Her calmness was said to be the opposite of the fierce temperament of her consort. Maria is said to have influenced the rule of Charles in the Duchy, intervening on behalf of supplicants and to ask him to show mercy. Because she had a reputation for being able to control the feared temperament of Charles, she was often approached by supplicants. She accompanied him around the Duchy as long as her constant pregnancies allowed for that possibility. Maria remained a committed Lutheran: in letters to her father, she expressed her discontent with the spread of Calvinism in Simmern, and in 1585 asked him to send her a Lutheran preacher. Charles described her as more educated in religion than anyone to be found, and she is believed to have affected Charles to adopt an even stronger pro-Lutheran political view.

Maria bore six children in just eight years, but only one survived for more than a few years. She herself died in Eskilstuna Palace after a long-term illness in 1589, and was buried in the Strängnäs Cathedral. Later examinations of her remains showed her to have been a small, fragile brunette.

Duke Charles was said to have mourned her greatly. The town Mariestad, founded in 1583, and the royal estate Marieholm are named for her.

== Issue ==
1. Margareta Elisabet (24 September 1580 – 26 August 1585), died in childhood
2. Elisabet Sabina (12 March 1582 – 6 July 1585), died in childhood
3. Ludvig (17 March – 26 May 1583), died in infancy
4. Catharina (10 November 1584 – 13 December 1638)
5. Gustav (12 June – 4 December 1587), died in infancy
6. Maria (18 December 1588 – 24 April 1589), died in infancy

== Ancestors ==
Ancestors of Maria of the Palatinate, Duchess of Södermanland

8. John II, Count Palatine of Simmern
4. Frederick III, Elector Palatine
9. Beatrix of Baden
2. Louis VI, Elector Palatine
10. Casimir, Margrave of Brandenburg-Bayreuth
5. Marie of Brandenburg-Kulmbach
11. Susanna of Bavaria
1. Maria of the Palatinate-Simmern
12. William II, Landgrave of Hesse
6. Philip I, Landgrave of Hesse
13. Anna of Mecklenburg-Schwerin
3. Elisabeth of Hesse
14. George, Duke of Saxony
7. Christine of Saxony
15. Barbara Jagiellon

Swedish royalty
Preceded by Ingeborg of Norway	Duchess of Södermanland; 1579–1589	Succeeded by Christina of Holstein-Gottorp
