= Duchess of Nericia =

Duchess of Nericia or Duchess of Närke may refer to:

- Princess Maria, Duchess of Nericia 1579–1589 (also of Södermanland and Värmland), as the consort of Prince Carl (later King Carl IX of Sweden)
- Princess Christina, Duchess of Nericia 1592–1604 (also of Södermanland and Värmland), then Queen consort of King Carl IX of Sweden
