= Otto Henry =

Otto Henry may refer to:

- Otto Henry, Elector Palatine
- Otto Henry, Count Palatine of Sulzbach
- Otto Henry (sailor), Australian sailor
