= Maria, Duchess of Sudermania =

Maria, Duchess of Sudermania - Swedish: Hertiginnan Maria av Södermanland - may refer to:

- Maria of the Palatinate-Simmern, Swedish princess (consort) 1579
- Maria Pavlovna, Swedish princess (consort) 1908
