= Countess Palatine Barbara of Zweibrücken-Neuburg =

Countess of Oettingen-Oettingen (1559–1618)

Countess Palatine Barbara
- Countess of Oettingen-Oettingen
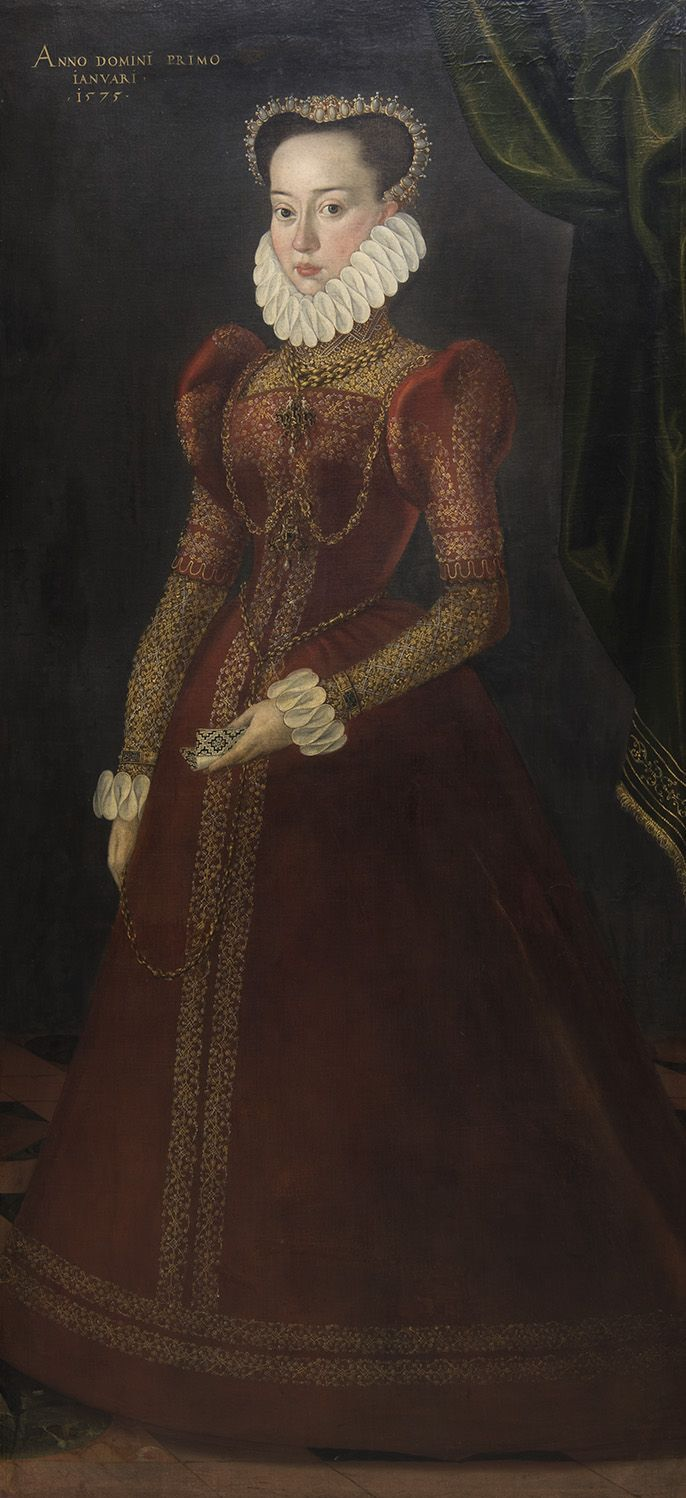
- Countess Palatine Barbara of Zweibrücken-Neuburg, oil painting, 1575
- Born: 27 July 1559; Neuburg
- Died: 5 March 1618 (aged 58); Oettingen
- Buried: Castle Church of St. Michael in Harburg
- Noble family: House of Wittelsbach (by birth); House of Oettingen-Oettingen (by marriage)
- Spouse: Gottfried of Oettingen-Oettingen
- Issue: Jakobina of Oettingen-Oettingen
- Father: Wolfgang, Count Palatine of Zweibrücken
- Mother: Anna of Hesse

Countess Palatine Barbara of Zweibrücken-Neuburg (27 July 1559 – 5 March 1618) was a German alchemist. She was a Countess Palatine of Zweibrücken by birth and by marriage Countess of Oettingen-Oettingen.

== Life ==
Barbara was born in Neuburg, a daughter of Duke and Count Palatine Wolfgang of Zweibrücken (1526–1569) from his marriage to Anna (1529–1591), the daughter of Philip I, Landgrave of Hesse.

On 7 November 1591, she married Count Gottfried of Oettingen-Oettingen (1554–1622) in Oettingen. She was his second wife. She brought a dowry of 14,000guilder into the marriage. In 1594, Barbara gave birth to a daughter named Jakobina, but she died later that year.

Countess Barbara of Oettingen studied alchemy intensively and is considered one of the most important women in the history of the field. She employed several alchemists and corresponded extensively on this subject with her nephew, Augustus, Count Palatine of Sulzbach. Barbara also performed numerous experiments for Emperor Rudolf II in his residence in Prague, until she was expelled from the court.

Barbara died in Oettingen in 1618 was buried beside her husband in the Castle Church of St. Michael in Harburg. Their tomb is decorated figure of the Countess at the side of her husband and his first wife.

== Ancestry ==
Ancestors of Countess Palatine Barbara of Zweibrücken-Neuburg

16. Louis I, Count Palatine of Zweibrücken
8. Alexander, Count Palatine of Zweibrücken
17. Johanna of Croÿ
4. Louis II, Count Palatine of Zweibrücken
18. Kraft VI, Count of Hohenlohe-Weikersheim
9. Margarete of Hohenlohe-Neuenstein
19. Helene of Württemberg
2. Wolfgang, Count Palatine of Zweibrücken
20. Louis II, Landgrave of Lower Hesse (= 24)
10. William I, Landgrave of Lower Hesse
21. Mechthild of Württemberg-Urach (= 25)
5. Elisabeth of Hesse
22. William IV, Duke of Brunswick-Lüneburg
11. Anna of Brunswick
23. Elizabeth of Stolberg-Wernigerode
1. Countess Palatine Barbara of Zweibrücken-Neuburg
24. Louis II, Landgrave of Lower Hesse (= 20)
12. William II, Landgrave of Hesse
25. Mechthild of Württemberg-Urach (= 25)
6. Philip I, Landgrave of Hesse
26. Magnus II, Duke of Mecklenburg
13. Anna of Mecklenburg-Schwerin
27. Sophie of Pomerania-Stettin
3. Anna of Hesse
28. Albert III, Duke of Saxony
14. George, Duke of Saxony
29. Sidonie of Poděbrady
7. Christine of Saxony
30. Casimir IV Jagiellon
15. Barbara Jagiellon
31. Elisabeth of Austria
