= Dorothea Susanne of Simmern =

- Duchess of Saxony and Saxe-Weimar; Landgravine of Thuringia
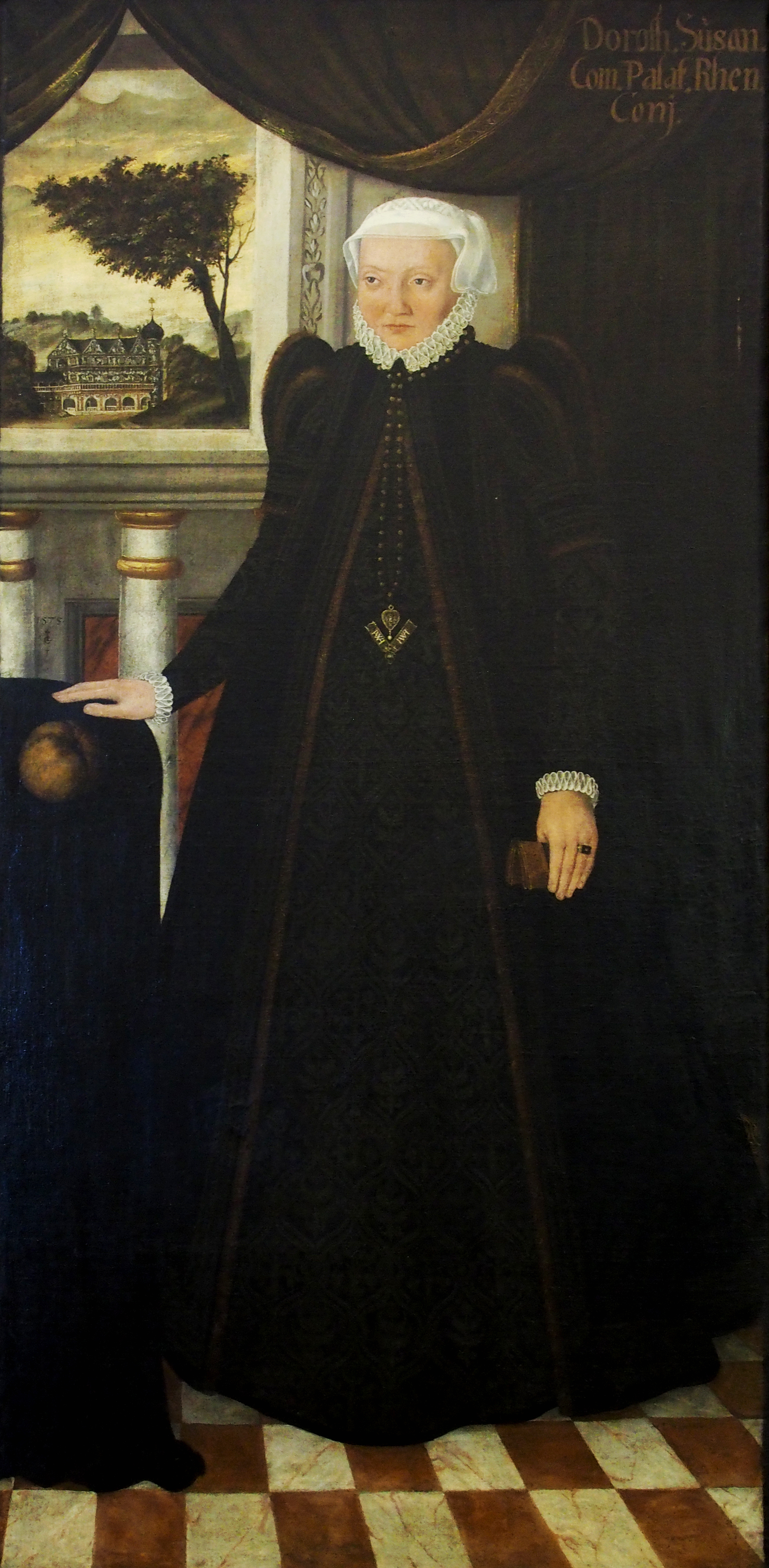
- Tenure: November 1566 – 1572; 1572 – 2 March 1573
- Born: 15 November 1544; Simmern
- Died: 8 April 1592 (aged 47); Weimar
- Spouse: John William, Duke of Saxe-Weimar
- Issue among others: Frederick William I, Duke of Saxe-Weimar; John II, Duke of Saxe-Weimar; Maria, Abbess of Quedlinburg
- House: House of Wittelsbach
- Father: Frederick III, Elector Palatine
- Mother: Marie of Brandenburg-Kulmbach

Dorothea Susanne of Simmern (15 November 1544 in Simmern – 8 April 1592 in Weimar) was a princess of the Electorate of the Palatinate and by marriage Duchess of Saxe-Weimar.

== Life ==
Dorothea Susanne was the daughter of Elector Palatine Frederick III (1515–1576) from his marriage to Princess Marie of Brandenburg-Kulmbach (1519–1567), daughter of Margrave Casimir of Brandenburg-Kulmbach.

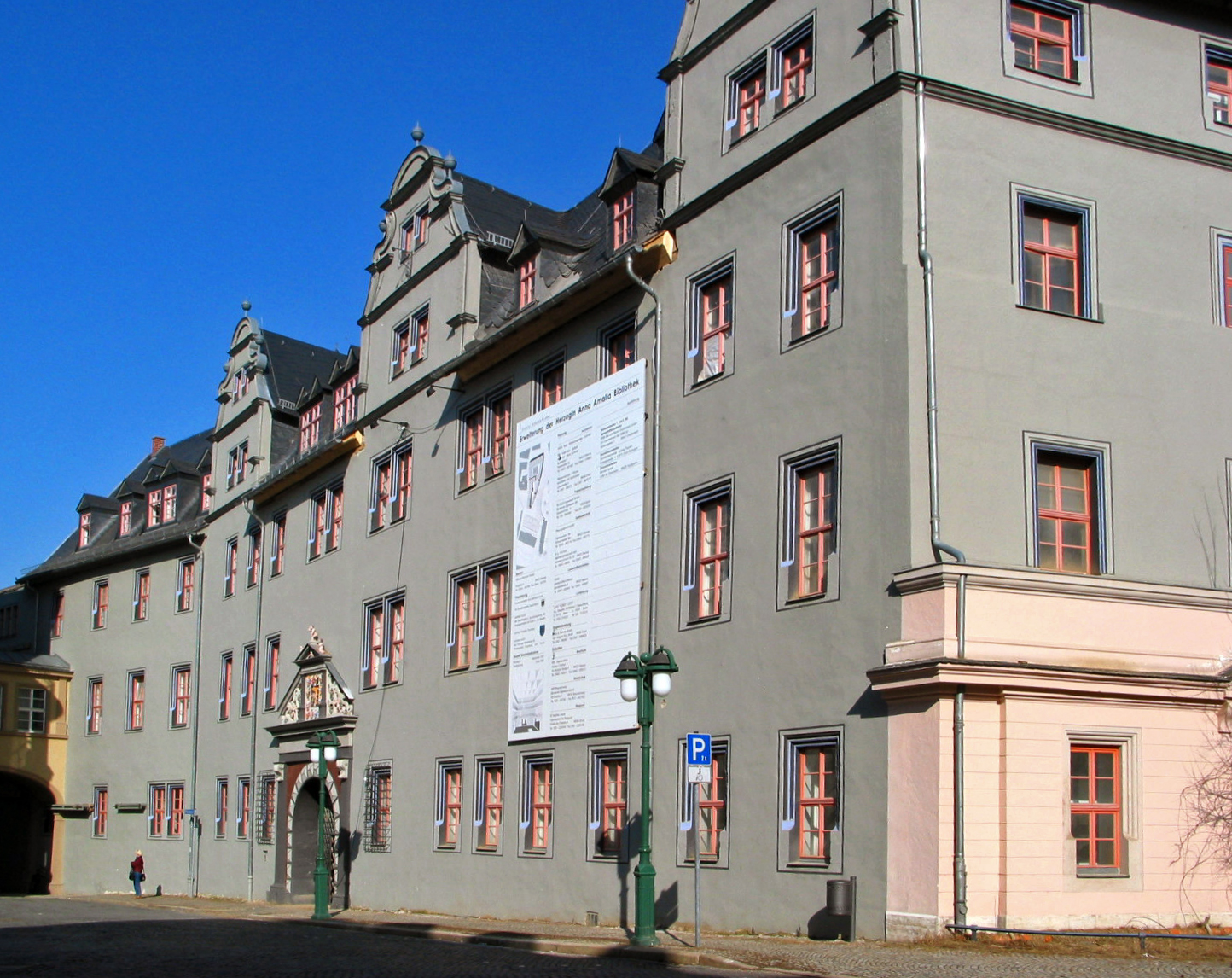
The Red Castle in Weimar, built in 1574-1576 as a widow seat for Dorothea Susanne

She married on 15 June 1560 in Heidelberg Duke John William, of Saxe-Weimar (1530–1573). After their marriage, the couple lived mostly in Weimar. After the death of her husband, Elector August of Saxony acted as guardian of her children. This policy was meant to isolate the children from their mother's political and religious influence. She was assigned a new residence outside Weimar, appropriately named New House. The Red Castle in Weimar was built for her from 1574 to 1576. She used it as her widow seat after its completion. Its Renaissance portal is decorated with an alliance coat of arms of Dorothea Susanne and her husband.

In 1581, the widowed Duchess turned to write to her brothers, Louis VI and John Casimir to induce the guardian of her eldest son, Elector August in Dresden, to promote the marry her eldest son with a Württemberg princess.

Dorothea Susanne died in 1592 and was buried in the church of St. Peter und Paul in Weimar; her motto was I Know That My Redeemer Lives.

== Issue ==
From her marriage, Dorothea Susanne had the following children:

- Frederick William I, Duke of Saxe-Weimar (b. Weimar, 25 April 1562 - d. Weimar, 7 July 1602).

first married in 1583 Princess Sophia of Württemberg (1563-1590)
married secondly in countess palatine Anna Maria of Neuburg

- Sibylle Marie (b. Weimar, 7 November 1563 - d. Altenburg, 20 February 1569).
- stillborn son (Weimar, 9 October 1564).
- John II, Duke of Saxe-Weimar (b. Weimar, 22 May 1570 - d. Weimar, 18 July 1605).

married in 1593 princess Dorothea Maria of Anhalt (1574-1614)

- Maria (b. Weimar, 7 October 1571 - d. Quedlinburg, 7 March 1610), Abbess of Quedlinburg (1601–1610).
