= Otto Henry, Count Palatine of Sulzbach =

Holy Roman Empire noble (1556–1604)

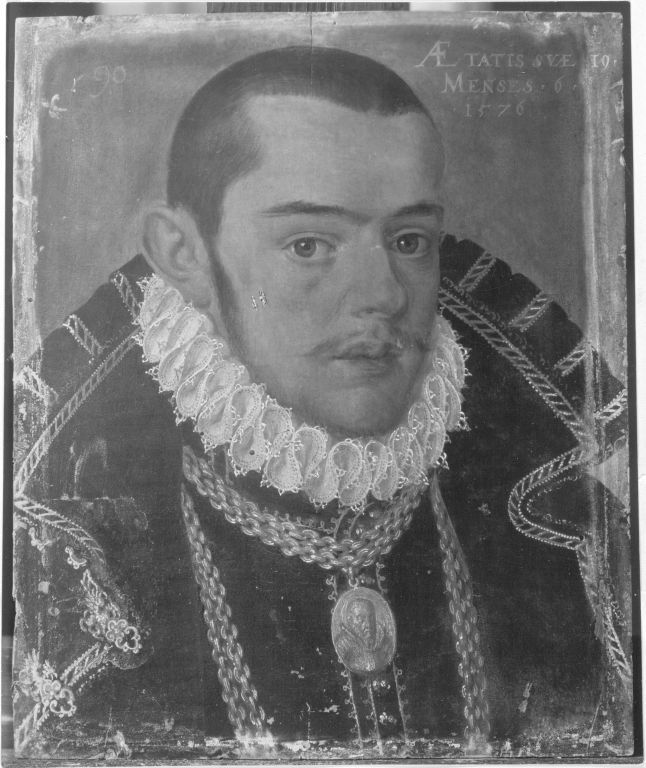
- Born: 22 July 1556
- Died: 29 August 1604 (aged 48)
- Noble family: House of Wittelsbach
- Spouse: Duchess Dorothea Maria of Württemberg
- Father: Wolfgang, Count Palatine of Zweibrücken
- Mother: Anna of Hesse

Otto Henry of Sulzbach (22 July 1556 – 29 August 1604) was the Count Palatine of Sulzbach from 1569 until 1604.

== Life ==
Otto Henry was born in Amberg in 1556 as one of five sons of Wolfgang, Count Palatine of Zweibrücken. After his father's death in 1569, his lands were partitioned between Otto Henry and his four brothers — Otto Henry received the territory around Sulzbach-Rosenberg. Otto Henry died in Sulzbach in 1604 and was buried in Lauingen. Without any surviving sons, Sulzbach was inherited by his brother Philip Louis of Palatinate-Neuburg.

== Marriage ==
Otto Henry married Dorothea Maria of Württemberg (3 September 1559 – 23 March 1639), daughter of Duke Christopher, on 25 November 1582 and had the following children:

1. Louis (6 January (1584 – 12 March 1584)
2. Anne Elizabeth (19 January 1585 – 18 April 1585)
3. George Frederick (15 March 1587 – 25 April 1587)
4. Dorothea Sophie (10 March 1588 – 24 September 1607)
5. Sabine (25 February 1589 – 1 September 1645), married in 1625 Baron George of Wartenberg.
6. Otto George (9 April 1590 – 20 May 1590)
7. Susanne (6 June 1591 – 21 February 1661), married in 1613 George John II, Count Palatine of Lützelstein-Guttenberg.
8. Marie Elizabeth (5 April 1593 – 23 February 1594)
9. Anne Sybille (10 May 1594 – 10 December 1594)
10. Anne Sophie (6 December 1595 – 21 April 1596)
11. Magdalena Sabine (6 December 1595 – 18 February 1596)
12. Dorothea Ursula (2 September 1597 – 25 March 1598)
13. Frederick Christian (19 January 1600 – 25 March 1600)

== Ancestors ==
Ancestors of Otto Henry, Count Palatine of Sulzbach

8. Alexander, Count Palatine of Zweibrücken
4. Louis II, Count Palatine of Zweibrücken
9. Margarete of Hohenlohe-Neuenstein
2. Wolfgang, Count Palatine of Zweibrücken
10. William I, Landgrave of Lower Hesse
5. Elisabeth of Hesse
11. Anna of Brunswick
1. Otto Henry, Count Palatine of Sulzbach
12. William II, Landgrave of Hesse
6. Philip I, Landgrave of Hesse
13. Anna of Mecklenburg-Schwerin
3. Anna of Hesse
14. George, Duke of Saxony
7. Christine of Saxony
15. Barbara Jagiellon

Regnal titles
Preceded by Wolfgang	Count Palatine of Sulzbach; 1569 – 1604	Succeeded by Philip Louis

== Sources ==
- Gack, Georg Christoph. Geschichte des Herzogthums Sulzbach: nach seinen Staats- und Religions-Verhältnissen, als wesentlicher Beitrag zur bayerischen Geschichte, Weigel, 1847, S. 183 ff.
