= Elisabeth of Hesse, Electress Palatine =

Elisabeth of Hesse
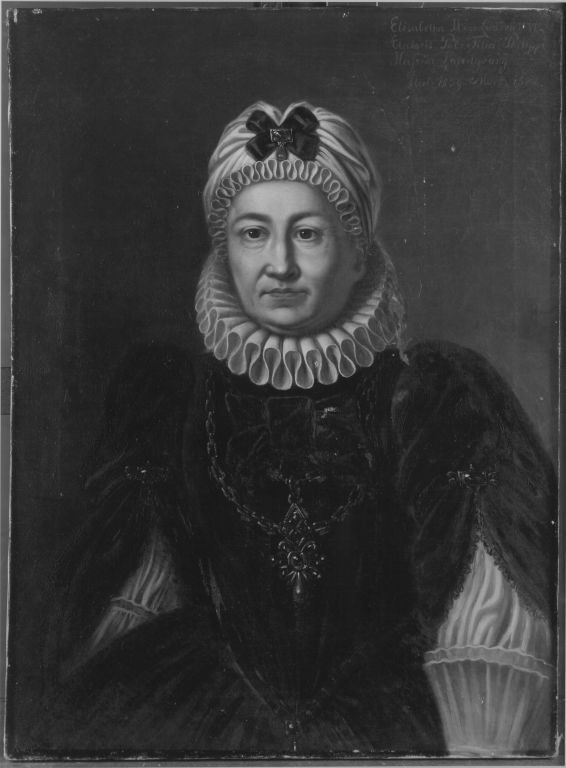

Electress Palatine
- Tenure: 26 October 1576 – 14 March 1582
- Born: 13 February 1539; Kassel
- Died: 14 March 1582 (aged 43); Heidelberg
- Spouse: Louis VI, Elector Palatine (m. 1560)
- Issue: Anna Marie, Duchess of Södermanland; Elisabeth; Dorothea Elisabeth; Dorothea; Frederick Philip; Johann Friedrich; Ludwig; Katharina; Christine; Frederick IV, Elector Palatine; Philip; Elisabeth
- House: House of Hesse
- Father: Philip I, Landgrave of Hesse
- Mother: Christine of Saxony

Elisabeth of Hesse (13 February 1539 – 14 March 1582) was a German noblewoman, by birth a member of the House of Hesse and by virtue of marriage Electress of Pfalz-Simmern.

== Early life ==
She was born as the seventh child and fourth daughter of Philip I, Landgrave of Hesse and his wife, Duchess Christine of Saxony, daughter of George, Duke of Saxony.

== Family ==
On 8 July 1560 she married Louis VI, Elector Palatine. They had twelve children in just fifteen years, but only four of them survived childhood:

1. Anna Marie (b. Heidelberg, 24 July 1561 - d. Eskilstuna, 29 July 1589), married Charles IX of Sweden
2. Elisabeth (b. Heidelberg, 15 June 1562 - d. Heidelberg, 2 November 1562), died in infancy.
3. Dorothea Elisabeth (b. Jagdschloß Deinschwang, 12 January 1565 - d. Jagdschloß Deinschwang, 7 March 1565), died in infancy.
4. Dorothea (b. Amberg, 4 August 1566 - d. Amberg, 10 March 1568), died in childhood.
5. Frederick Philip (b. Amberg, 19 October 1567 - d. Amberg, 14 November 1568), died in infancy.
6. Johann Friedrich (b. Amberg, 17 February 1569 - d. Amberg, 20 March 1569), died in infancy.
7. Ludwig (b. Amberg, 30 December 1570 - d. Amberg, 7 May 1571), died in infancy.
8. Katharina (b. Amberg, April 1572 - d. Amberg, 16 October 1586), died unmarried.
9. Christine (b. Schloß Hirschwald, 6 January 1573 - d. Zweibrücken, 21 July 1619), died unmarried.
10. Frederick IV, Elector Palatine (b. Amberg, 5 March 1574 - d. Heidelberg, 9 September 1610).
11. Philip (b. Amberg, 4 May 1575 - d. Amberg, 9 August 1575), died in infancy.
12. Elisabeth (b. Amberg, 24 November 1576 - d. Heidelberg, 10 April 1577), died in infancy.

== Later life and death ==
She died (from an illness associated with painless discharge of pus and blood from the intestines, as is evident from Marius' letters and councils to Elisabeth's husband, Elector Ludwig VI) a year before her husband and was buried on April 1, 1582, in the Church of the Holy Spirit (Heidelberg).

== Ancestors ==
Ancestors of Elisabeth of Hesse, Electress Palatine

16. Louis I, Landgrave of Hesse
8. Louis II, Landgrave of Hesse
17. Anna of Saxony
4. William II, Landgrave of Hesse
18. Ludwig I, Count of Württemberg-Urach
9. Matilda of Württemberg-Urach
19. Mechthild of the Palatinate
2. Philip I, Landgrave of Hesse
20. Henry IV, Duke of Mecklenburg
10. Magnus II, Duke of Mecklenburg-Schwerin and Güstrow
21. Dorothea of Brandenburg
5. Anna of Mecklenburg-Schwerin
22. Eric II, Duke of Pomerania
11. Sophie of Pomerania-Wolgast
23. Sophia of Pomerania-Stolp
1. Elisabeth of Hesse
24. Frederick II, Elector of Saxony
12. Albert III, Duke of Saxony
25. Margarete of Austria
6. George, Duke of Saxony
26. George of Poděbrady
13. Sidonie of Poděbrady
27. Kunigunde of Sternberg
3. Christine of Saxony
28. Władysław II Jagiełło
14. Casimir IV Jagiellon
29. Sophia of Halshany
7. Barbara Jagiellon
30. Albert II of Germany
15. Elisabeth of Austria
31. Elizabeth of Luxembourg

== Sources ==
- Cook, Chris; Broadhead, Philip (2012). The Routledge Companion to Early Modern Europe, 1453-1763. Routledge.
- Thomas, Andrew L. (2010). A House Divided: Wittelsbach Confessional Court Cultures in the Holy Roman Empire, C. 1550-1650. Brill.

Elisabeth of Hesse, Electress Palatine House of Hesse Born: 13 February 1539 Died: 14 March 1582
Royal titles
Preceded by Amalia of Neuenahr	Electress Palatine; 1576–1582	Succeeded by Anne of Ostfriesland
