= Anna of Hesse =

Countess Palatine of Zweibrücken (1529–1591)

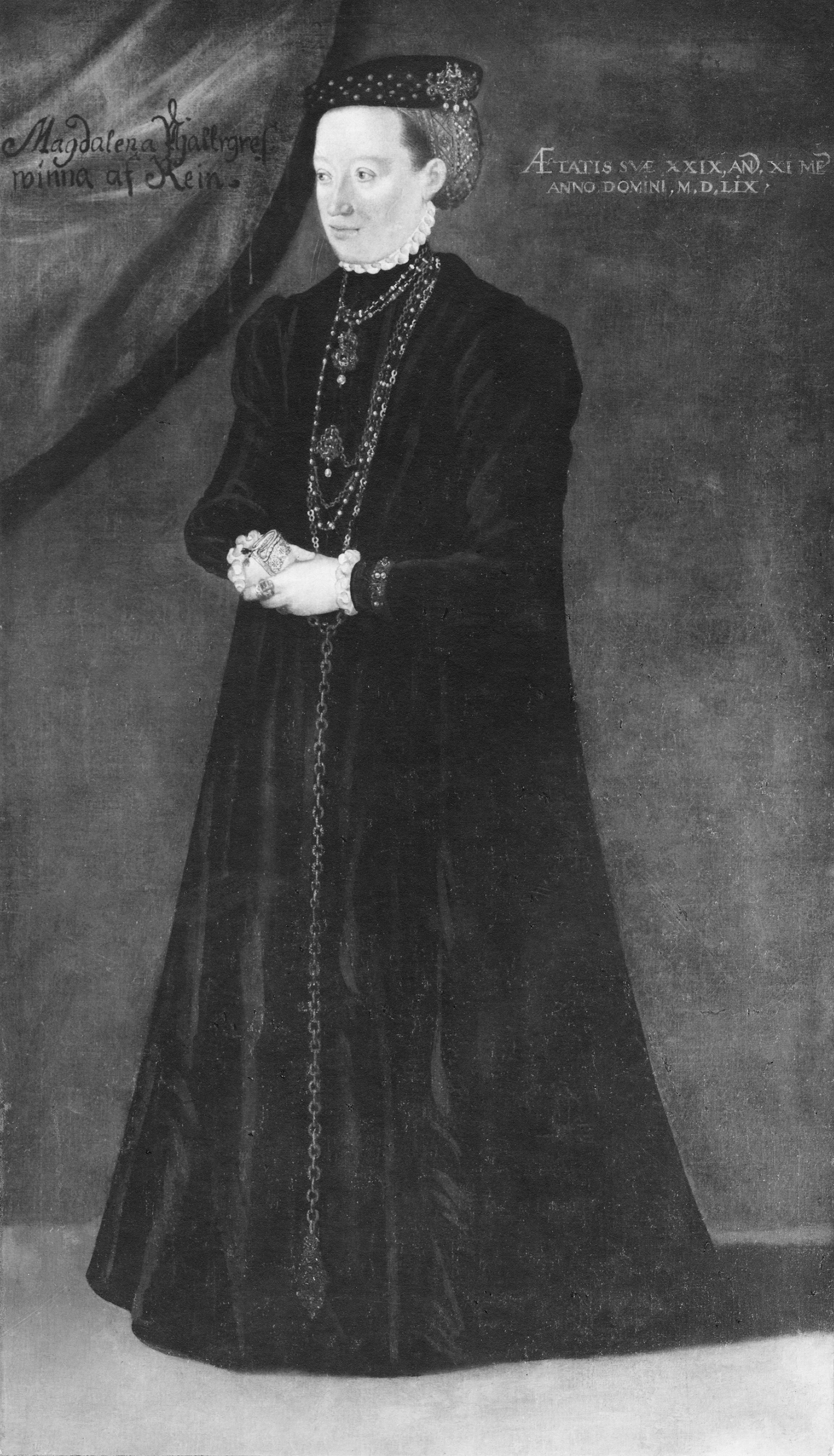
- Born: 26 October 1529; Kassel
- Died: 10 July 1591 (aged 61); Meisenheim
- Spouse: Wolfgang, Count Palatine of Zweibrücken (m. 1544; died 1569)
- Issue Detail: Countess Palatine Christine; Philip Louis, Count Palatine of Neuburg; John I, Count Palatine of Zweibrücken; Countess Palatine Anna; Countess Palatine Elisabeth; Otto Henry, Count Palatine of Sulzbach; Frederick, Count Palatine of Zweibrücken-Vohenstrauss-Parkstein; Barbara, Countess of Oettingen-Oettingen; Charles I, Count Palatine of Zweibrücken-Birkenfeld; Maria Elisabeth, Countess of Leiningen-Dagsburg-Hardenburg
- House: House of Hesse
- Father: Philip I, Landgrave of Hesse
- Mother: Christine of Saxony

Anna of Hesse (26 October 1529, Kassel – 10 July 1591, Meisenheim) was a princess of Hesse by birth and marriage Countess Palatine of Zweibrücken.

== Early life ==
Anna was a daughter of Landgrave Philip I of Hesse (1501–1567) from his marriage to Princess Christine of Saxony (1505–1549), a daughter of Duke George of Saxony.

== Biography ==
She married Count Palatine Wolfgang of Zweibrücken (1526–1569) on 24 February 1544. After the death of her husband, Anna and her brother William and Elector Palatine Louis VI jointly acted as guardians for her children. William was also the executor of Wolfgang's testament.

Around 1590, Anna founded the St. Anne's churchyard in Heidelberg. In 1596, a stone monument in her honor was erected in this churchyard. When the churchyard was closed in 1845, the monument was moved to the Bergfriedhof churchyard.

Anna died in 1591 and was buried in the Lutheran Church of Meisenheim Castle.

== Issue ==
Anna was constantly pregnant during much of her marriage, giving birth to thirteen children in just eighteen years. Ten of them lived to adulthood:

- Christine (1546–1619)
- Philip Louis (1547–1614), Count Palatine of Palatinate-Neuburg
  married in 1574 princess Anna of Cleves (1552–1632)
- John I (1550–1604), Count Palatine of Palatinate-Zweibrücken
  married in 1579 princess Magdalene of Jülich-Cleves-Berg (1553–1633)
- Dorothea Agnes (1551–1552), died in infancy
- Elizabeth (1553–1554), died in infancy
- Anna (1554–1576)
- Elizabeth (1555–1625)
- Otto Henry (1556–1604), Count Palatine of Palatinate-Sulzbach
  married in 1582 duchess Marie Dorothea of Württemberg (1559–1639)
- Frederick (1557–1597), Count Palatine of Palatinate-Zweibrücken-Vohenstrauss-Parkstein
  married in 1587 duchess Catherine Sophie of Legnica (1561–1608)
- Barbara (1559–1618)
  married in 1591 Count Gottfried of Oettingen-Oettingen (1554–1622)
- Charles I (1560–1600), Count Palatine of Palatinate-Zweibrücken-Birkenfeld
  married in 1586 duchess Maria Dorothea of Brunswick-Lüneburg (1570–1649)
- Maria Elisabeth (1561–1629)
  married in 1585 Count Emich XII of Leiningen-Dagsburg-Hardenburg (1562–1607)
- Susanna (1564–1565), died in infancy

== Ancestry ==
Ancestors of Anna of Hesse

8. Louis II, Landgrave of Hesse
4. William II, Landgrave of Hesse
9. Matilda of Württemberg-Urach
2. Philip I, Landgrave of Hesse
10. Magnus II, Duke of Mecklenburg-Schwerin and Güstrow
5. Anna of Mecklenburg-Schwerin
11. Sophie of Pomerania-Wolgast
1. Anna of Hesse
12. Albert III, Duke of Saxony
6. George, Duke of Saxony
13. Sidonie of Poděbrady
3. Christine of Saxony
14. Casimir IV Jagiellon
7. Barbara Jagiellon
15. Elisabeth of Austria
