= Albert Alcibiades, Margrave of Brandenburg-Kulmbach =

Albert Alcibiades
- Margrave of Brandenburg-Kulmbach
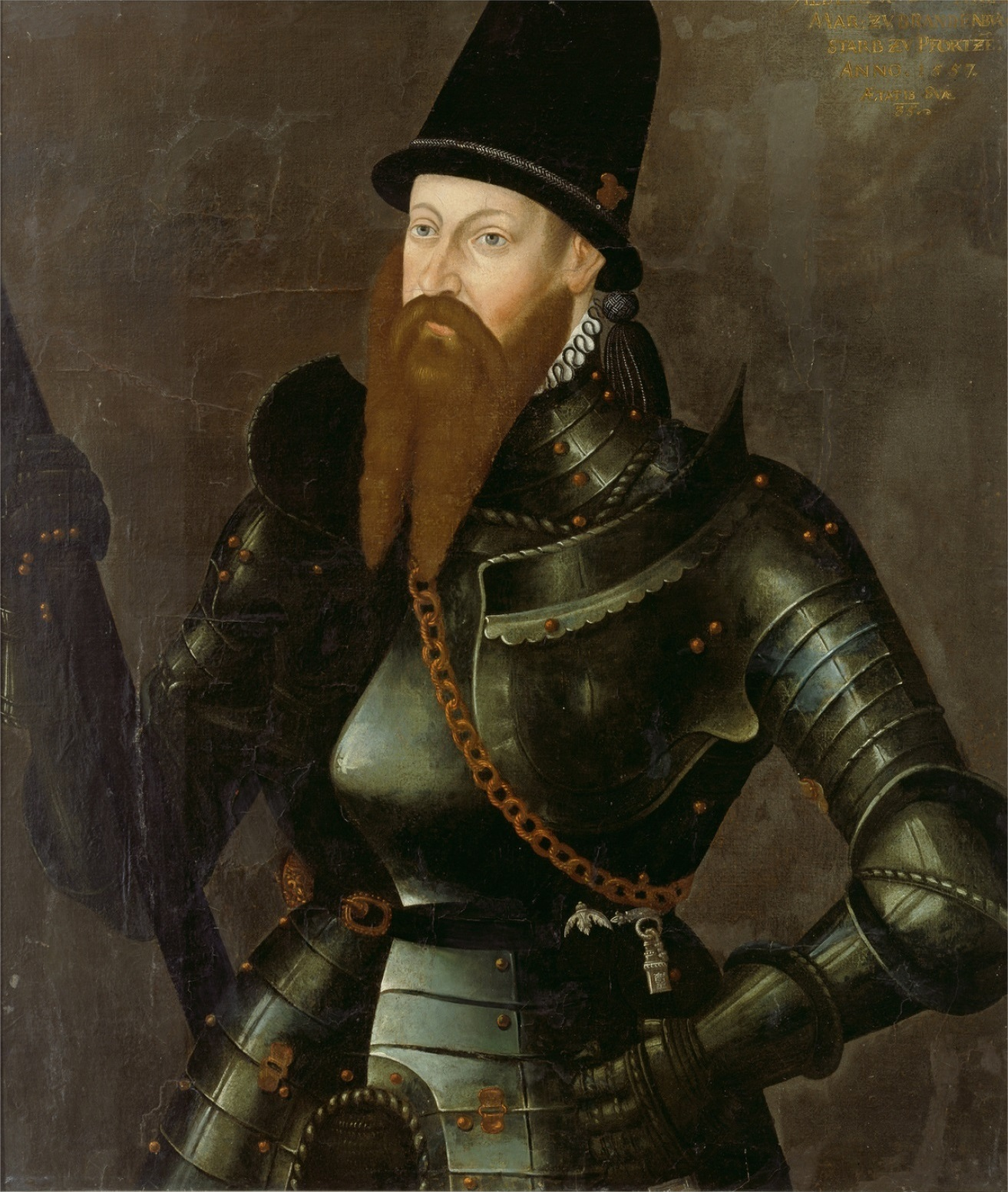
- Portrait by Andreas Riehl the Elder, 1557

Margrave of Brandenburg-Kulmbach
- Reign: 1527–1553
- Predecessor: Casimir
- Successor: George Frederick
- Born: 28 March 1522; Ansbach
- Died: 8 January 1557 (aged 34); Pforzheim
- House: House of Hohenzollern
- Father: Casimir, Margrave of Brandenburg-Bayreuth
- Mother: Susanna of Bavaria

Albert II (German: Albrecht; 28 March 1522 – 8 January 1557) was the margrave of Brandenburg-Kulmbach (Brandenburg-Bayreuth) from 1527 to 1553. He was a member of the Franconian branch of the House of Hohenzollern. Because of his bellicose nature, Albert was given the cognomen Bellator ("the Warlike") during his lifetime. Posthumously, he became known as Alcibiades.

== Biography ==
Albert was born in Ansbach and, losing his father Casimir in 1527, he came under the regency of his uncle George, Margrave of Brandenburg-Ansbach, a strong adherent of Protestantism.

In 1541, he received Bayreuth as his share of the family lands, but as the chief town of his principality was Kulmbach, he is sometimes referred to as the Margrave of Brandenburg-Kulmbach. His restless and turbulent nature marked him out for a military career; and having collected a small band of soldiers, he assisted Emperor Charles V in his war with France in 1543.

The Peace of Crépy in September 1544 deprived him of this employment, but he won a considerable reputation, and when Charles was preparing to attack the Schmalkaldic League, he took pains to win Albert's assistance.

Sharing in the attack on the Electorate of Saxony, Albert was taken prisoner at Rochlitz in March 1547 by Elector John Frederick of Saxony, but was released as a result of the Emperor's victory at the Battle of Mühlberg in the succeeding April.

He then followed the fortunes of his friend Elector Maurice of Saxony, deserted Charles, and joined the league which proposed to overthrow the Emperor by an alliance with King Henry II of France.

He took part in the subsequent campaign, but when the Peace of Passau was signed in August 1552 he separated himself from his allies and began a crusade of plunder in Franconia, which led to the Second Margrave War.

Having extorted a large sum of money from the citizens of Nuremberg, he quarrelled with his supporter, the French King, and offered his services to the Emperor. Charles, anxious to secure such a famous fighter, gladly assented to Albert's demands and gave the imperial sanction to his possession of the lands taken from the bishops of Würzburg and Bamberg; and his conspicuous bravery was of great value to the Emperor on the retreat from the Siege of Metz in January 1553.

When Charles left Germany a few weeks later, Albert renewed his depredations in Franconia. These soon became so serious that a league was formed to crush him, and Maurice of Saxony led an army against his former comrade.

The rival forces met at Sievershausen on 9 July 1553, and after a combat of unusual ferocity Albert was put to flight. Henry, Duke of Brunswick-Wolfenbüttel, then took command of the troops of the league, and after Albert had been placed under the Imperial ban in December 1553 he was defeated by Duke Henry, and compelled to flee to France. He there entered the service of Henry II of France and had undertaken a campaign to regain his lands when he died at Pforzheim on 8 January 1557.

He is defined by Thomas Carlyle as "a failure of a Fritz," with "features" of a Frederick the Great in him, "but who burnt away his splendid qualities as a mere temporary shine for the able editors, and never came to anything, full of fire, too much of it wildfire, not in the least like an Alcibiades except in the change of fortune he underwent". He was buried at Heilsbronn Münster. His hymn "Was mein Got will, das g'scheh allzeit" was translated as "The will of God is always best".

Albert Alcibiades, Margrave of Brandenburg-Kulmbach House of Hohenzollern Born: 28 March 1522 Died: 8 January 1557
Regnal titles
Preceded by Casimir	Margrave of Brandenburg-Kulmbach; 1527/1541–1553	Succeeded by George Frederick
