= Countess Palatine Anna Maria of Neuburg =

Anna Maria of Neuburg
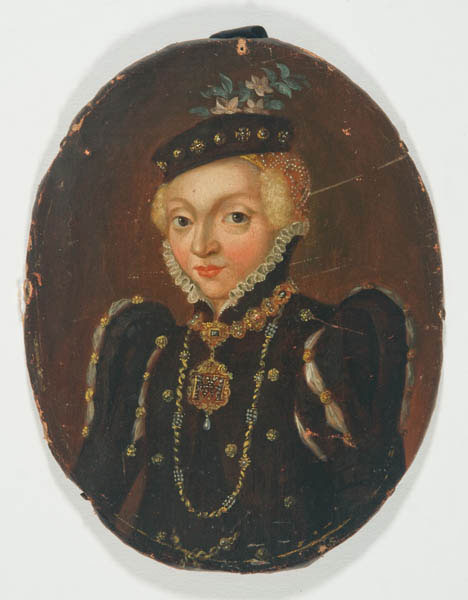
- Portrait c. 1600

Duchess consort of Saxe-Weimar
- Tenure: 9 September 1591 – 7 July 1602
- Born: 18 August 1575; Neuburg an der Donau
- Died: 11 February 1643 (aged 67); Dornburg
- Burial: Brethren Church, Altenburg
- Spouse: Frederick William I, Duke of Saxe-Weimar
- Issue among others...: Johann Philipp, Duke of Saxe-Altenburg; Friedrich, Duke of Saxe-Altenburg; Johann Wilhelm, Duke of Saxe-Altenburg; Dorothea, Duchess of Saxe-Eisenach; Friedrich Wilhelm II, Duke of Saxe-Altenburg
- House: Wittelsbach
- Father: Philip Louis, Count Palatine of Neuburg
- Mother: Anna of Jülich-Cleves-Berg
- Religion: Lutheranism

Countess Palatine Anna Maria of Neuburg (18 August 1575, Neuburg an der Donau – 11 February 1643, Dornburg) was Countess Palatine of Neuburg and by marriage Duchess of Saxe-Weimar.

== Life ==
Anna Maria was the eldest child of the Count Palatine and Duke Philip Louis of Neuburg (1547–1614) and Anna (1552–1632), daughter of Duke William of Jülich-Cleves-Berg.

She was married on 9 September 1591 in Neuburg to Duke Frederick William I of Saxe-Weimar (1562–1602). On the occasion of the marriage, a medal was minted in gold, representing the couple, one on each side with a bust. In 1604 she moved with her children from Weimar to Altenburg, which was separated from Weimar as an independent Duchy of Saxe-Altenburg for her sons. After she was widowed in 1602, Anna Maria sank into deep sadness and from 1612, she lived separate from her children on her Wittum, the District and City of Dornburg. During an attack on her Dornburg Castle by a Croatian force under General Tilly in 1631, during the Thirty Years' War, Anna Maria resisted the attackers but was robbed and wounded in the cheek. With the help of citizens rushed to the scene, the attackers were averted. Out of gratitude for this assistance, the Duchess donated a chalice to the local church.

Anna Maria died in 1643 and was buried in the brick royal crypt in the Brethren Church in Altenburg.

== Issue ==
From her marriage With Frederic William, Anna Maria had the following children:

- John Philip (1597–1639), Duke of Saxe-Altenburg

married in 1618 princess Elisabeth of Brunswick-Wolfenbüttel (1593–1650)

- Anna Sophie (1598–1641)

married in Duke in 1618 Charles Frederick I of Münsterberg-Oels (1593–1647)

- Frederick (1599–1625), Duke of Saxe-Altenburg
- John William (1600–1632), Duke of Saxe-Altenburg
- Dorothea (1601–1675)

married in 1633 Duke Albert IV of Saxe-Eisenach (1599–1644)

- Frederick William II (1603–1669), Duke of Saxe-Altenburg

married firstly in 1638 Princess Sophie Elisabeth of Brandenburg (1616–1650)
married secondly, in 1652 Princess Magdalene Sibylle of Saxony (1617–1668)

== Footnotes ==
Countess Palatine Anna Maria of Neuburg House of Wittelsbach Born: 18 August 1575 Died: 11 February 1643
German royalty
Vacant Title last held by Sophie of Württemberg	Duchess consort of Saxe-Weimar; 9 September 1591 – 7 July 1602	Succeeded by Dorothea Maria of Anhalt
