= Susanna of Bavaria =

- Margravine of Brandenburg-Kulmbach; Countess Palatine of Neuburg
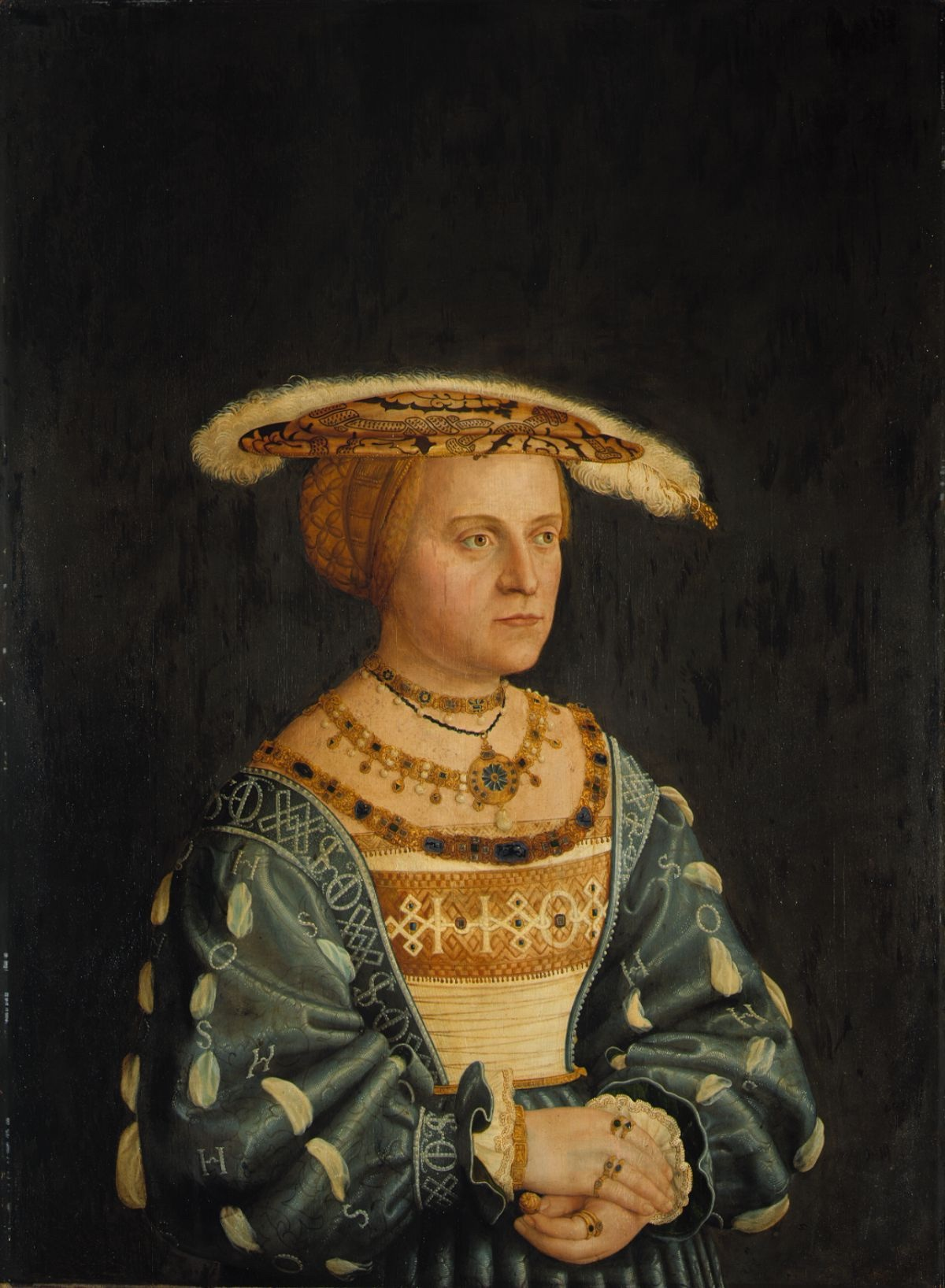
- Portrait by Barthel Beham, 1533
- Born: 2 April 1502; Munich
- Died: 23 April 1543 (aged 41); Neuburg an der Donau
- Spouse: Casimir, Margrave of Brandenburg-Bayreuth (m. 1518; died 1527) Otto Henry, Elector Palatine (m. 1529)
- Issue: Marie of Brandenburg-Kulmbach, Electress Palatine; Catherine of Brandenburg-Kulmbach; Albert II Alcibiades, Margrave of Brandenburg-Kulmbach; Kunigunde of Brandenburg-Kulmbach, Margravine of Baden-Durlach; Frederick of Brandenburg-Kulmbach
- House: House of Wittelsbach
- Father: Albert IV, Duke of Bavaria
- Mother: Kunigunde of Austria

Susanna of Bavaria (2 April 1502 – 23 April 1543) was a German princess. Born in Munich, she was the daughter of Albert IV, Duke of Bavaria, and Kunigunde of Austria, herself the daughter of Holy Roman Emperor Frederick III and Eleanor of Portugal. Her paternal grandparents were Albert III, Duke of Bavaria, and Anna of Brunswick-Grubenhagen-Einbeck.

== Biography ==
Susanna married Casimir, Margrave of Brandenburg-Bayreuth, in 1518. On 14 October 1519, she gave birth to her first child, Marie of Brandenburg-Kulmbach. Via this daughter, Susanna became an ancestress of King George I of Great Britain and the House of Hanover. Susanna and Casimir had five children:

- Marie of Brandenburg-Kulmbach, married Elector Palatine Frederick (1519–1576) in 1537. They were the parents of Louis VI, Elector Palatine
- Catherine (1520–1521)
- Albert II Alcibiades (1522–1557); Margrave of Brandenburg-Kulmbach
- Kunigunde (1524–1558), married in 1551 Charles II of Baden-Durlach (1529–1577)
- Frederick (1525-1525)

After Casimir's death in 1527, Susanna married Otto Henry, Count Palatine of Neuburg, on 16 October 1529. This second marriage produced no children.

Susanna died on 23 April 1543 in Neuburg an der Donau. She was 41 years old. She never became Electress Palatine, since she died before her second husband acquired the electoral dignity.

== Ancestors ==
Susanna's ancestors in three generations
Susanna of Bavaria	Father: Albert IV, Duke of Bavaria	Paternal Grandfather: Albert III, Duke of Bavaria	Paternal Great-grandfather: Ernest, Duke of Bavaria
Susanna of Bavaria	Father: Albert IV, Duke of Bavaria	Paternal Grandfather: Albert III, Duke of Bavaria	Paternal Great-grandmother: Elisabetta Visconti
Susanna of Bavaria	Father: Albert IV, Duke of Bavaria	Paternal Grandmother: Anna of Brunswick-Grubenhagen-Einbeck	Paternal Great-grandfather: Eric I, Duke of Brunswick-Grubenhagen
Susanna of Bavaria	Father: Albert IV, Duke of Bavaria	Paternal Grandmother: Anna of Brunswick-Grubenhagen-Einbeck	Paternal Great-grandmother: Elisabeth of Brunswick-Göttingen
Susanna of Bavaria	Mother: Kunigunde of Austria	Maternal Grandfather: Frederick III, Holy Roman Emperor	Maternal Great-grandfather: Ernest, Duke of Austria
Susanna of Bavaria	Mother: Kunigunde of Austria	Maternal Grandfather: Frederick III, Holy Roman Emperor	Maternal Great-grandmother: Cymburgis of Masovia
Susanna of Bavaria	Mother: Kunigunde of Austria	Maternal Grandmother: Eleanor of Portugal, Holy Roman Empress	Maternal Great-grandfather: Edward of Portugal
Susanna of Bavaria	Mother: Kunigunde of Austria	Maternal Grandmother: Eleanor of Portugal, Holy Roman Empress	Maternal Great-grandmother: Leonor of Aragon

Susanna of Bavaria House of Wittelsbach Born: 2 April 1502 Died: 23 April 1543
German nobility
Vacant Title last held by Sophia of Poland	Margravine of Brandenburg-Kulmbach; 25 August 1518 - 21 September 1527	Vacant Title next held by Elisabeth of Brandenburg-Küstrin
New title	Countess Palatine of Neuberg; 16 October 1529 - 23 April 1543	Vacant Title next held by Anna of Hesse
