= Marie of Brandenburg-Kulmbach =

Electress Palatine
- Tenure: 12 February 1559 – 31 October 1567
- Born: 14 October 1519; Ansbach
- Died: 31 October 1567 (aged 48); Heidelberg
- Burial: Church of the Holy Spirit, Heidelberg
- Spouse: Frederick III, Elector Palatine (m. 1537)
- Issue Detail: Alberta of Palatinate; Louis VI, Elector Palatine; Elizabeth, Duchess of Saxony; Hermann Louis of Palatinate; John Casimir, Count of Palatinate-Simmern; Dorothea Susanne, Duchess of Saxe-Weimar; Christof of Palatinate; Kunigunde, Countess of Nassau-Dillenburg
- House: Hohenzollern
- Father: Casimir, Margrave of Brandenburg-Bayreuth
- Mother: Susanna of Bavaria

Marie of Brandenburg-Kulmbach (14 October 1519 – 31 October 1567) was a Princess of Brandenburg-Kulmbach and by marriage Electress Palatine.

== Biography ==
Marie was the oldest child of the Margrave Casimir of Brandenburg-Kulmbach (1481–1527) from his marriage with Susanna of Bavaria (1502–1543), daughter of Duke Albert IV of Bavaria. After her father's death Marie was raised in the Lutheran faith by her uncle George Frederick.

On 21 October 1537, in Kreuznach, Marie married Frederick of Simmern (b. 1515), later Elector Palatine (1559–1576). The marriage was happy. Marie, who is described as intelligent and religious, influenced her Catholic husband toward Protestantism. In 1546, Frederick finally adopted Lutheranism and assumed the administration of the Franconian territories from his brother-in-law Albert Alcibiades, Margrave of Brandenburg-Kulmbach. Since their family was living in reduced circumstances, Marie repeatedly turned to her uncle Albert of Prussia for financial assistance.

After the death of Marie's stepfather Otto-Henry in 1559, her consort Frederick became Elector Palatine. As Electress, she was closely involved in governmental affairs, though Frederick tolerated no direct interference. She had influence in religious questions, and as a strong Lutheran she was a determined opponent of the Zwinglians.

The Electress spent the last year of her life suffering from gout and was mostly confined to her bed.

She was buried in the Church of the Holy Spirit in Heidelberg.

== Descendants ==
By her marriage, Marie had ten children:

- Alberta (1538–1553)
- Louis VI, Elector Palatine (1539–1583) m. (1) 1560 Princess Elizabeth of Hesse (1539–1582), m. (2) 1583 Princess Anne of Ostfriesland (1562–1621)
- Elizabeth (1540–1594) m. 1558 Duke John Frederick II of Saxony (1529–1595)
- Hermann Louis (1541–1556)
- John Casimir (1543–1592), Count Palatine of Simmern m. 1570 Princess Elizabeth of Saxony (1552–1590)
- Dorothea Susanne (1544–1592) m. 1560 Duke John William I of Saxe-Weimar (1530–1573)
- Albert (1546–1547)
- Anne Elizabeth (1549–1609) m. (1) 1569 Landgrave Philip II of Hesse-Rheinfels (1541–1583), m. (2) 1599 Count Palatine John Augustus of Veldenz-Lützelstein (1575–1611)
- Christopher, killed
- Charles (1552–1555)
- Cunigunde Jacobæa (1556–1586) m. 1580 Count John VI of Nassau-Dillenburg (1536–1606)

== Ancestors ==
Marie's ancestors in three generations
Marie of Brandenburg-Kulmbach	Father: Casimir, Margrave of Brandenburg-Bayreuth	Paternal Grandfather: Frederick I, Margrave of Brandenburg-Ansbach	Paternal Great-grandfather: Albrecht III, Elector of Brandenburg
Marie of Brandenburg-Kulmbach	Father: Casimir, Margrave of Brandenburg-Bayreuth	Paternal Grandfather: Frederick I, Margrave of Brandenburg-Ansbach	Paternal Great-grandmother: Anna of Saxony
Marie of Brandenburg-Kulmbach	Father: Casimir, Margrave of Brandenburg-Bayreuth	Paternal Grandmother: Sophia of Poland	Paternal Great-grandfather: Casimir IV Jagiellon
Marie of Brandenburg-Kulmbach	Father: Casimir, Margrave of Brandenburg-Bayreuth	Paternal Grandmother: Sophia of Poland	Paternal Great-grandmother: Elisabeth of Austria
Marie of Brandenburg-Kulmbach	Mother: Susanna of Bavaria	Maternal Grandfather: Albert IV, Duke of Bavaria	Maternal Great-grandfather: Albert III, Duke of Bavaria
Marie of Brandenburg-Kulmbach	Mother: Susanna of Bavaria	Maternal Grandfather: Albert IV, Duke of Bavaria	Maternal Great-grandmother: Anna of Brunswick-Grubenhagen-Einbeck
Marie of Brandenburg-Kulmbach	Mother: Susanna of Bavaria	Maternal Grandmother: Kunigunde of Austria	Maternal Great-grandfather: Frederick III, Holy Roman Emperor
Marie of Brandenburg-Kulmbach	Mother: Susanna of Bavaria	Maternal Grandmother: Kunigunde of Austria	Maternal Great-grandmother: Eleanor of Portugal

== Sources ==
- Thomas, Andrew L. (2010). A House Divided: Wittelsbach Confessional Court Cultures in the Holy Roman Empire, c. 1550-1650. Brill.
- August Kluckhohn (Hrsg.): Briefe Friedrich des Frommen, Kurfürsten von der Pfalz, C.A. Schwetschke und Sohn, 1868, S. 38 ff.
- August Kluckhohn: Wie ist Kurfürst Friedrich III von der Pfalz Calvinist geworden?, F. Straub, 1866, S. 427 f.

Royal titles
Preceded by Dorothea of Denmark	Electress Palatine; 1559–1567	Succeeded by Amalia of Neuenahr
