= Casimir, Margrave of Brandenburg-Kulmbach =

Margrave of Brandenburg-Kulmbach (1515-1527)

Casimir of Brandenburg-Bayreuth
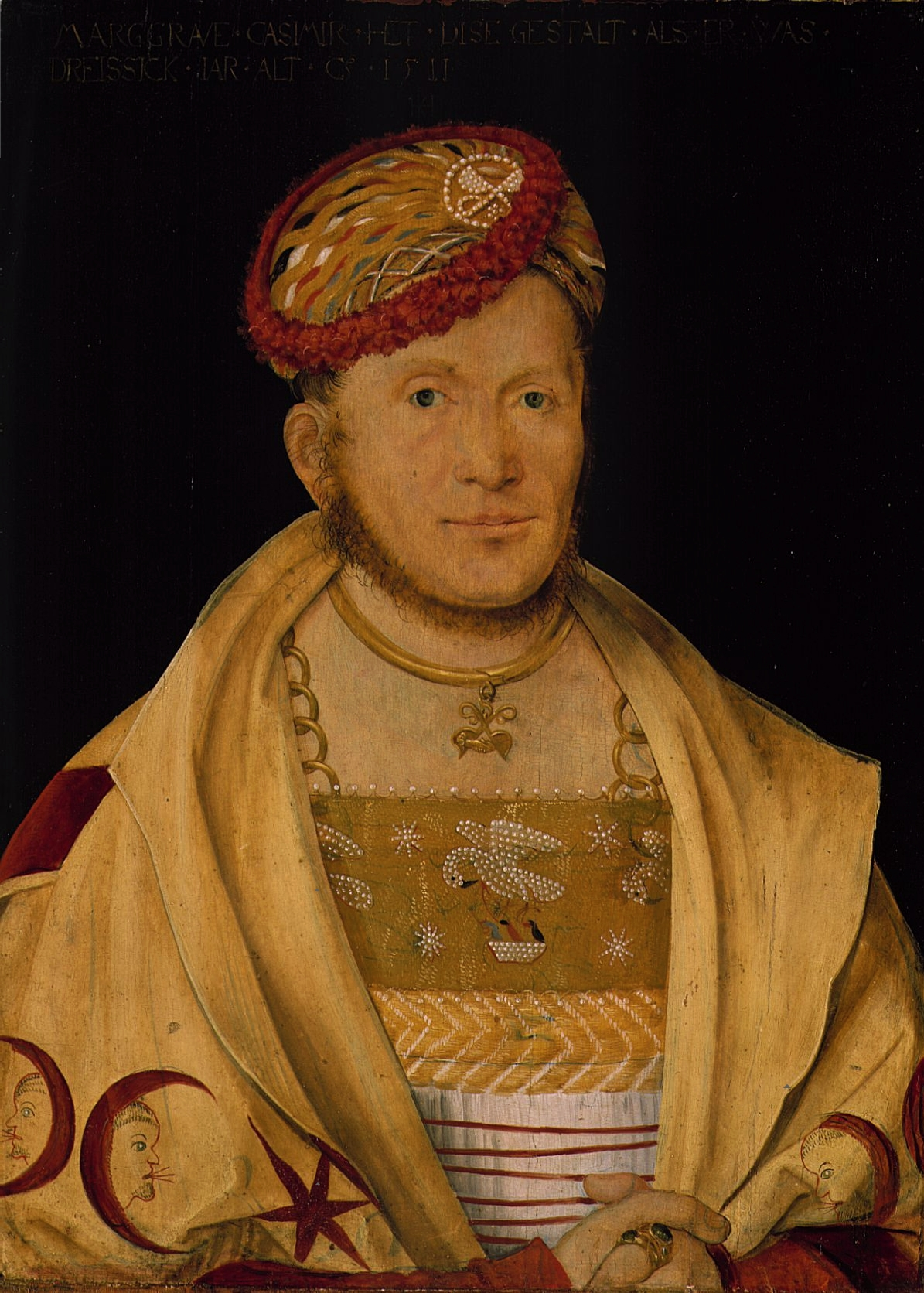
- Portrait by Hans von Kulmbach, 1511
- Born: 27 December 1481; Ansbach, Margraviate of Brandenburg-Ansbach
- Died: 21 September 1527 (aged 45); Buda
- Noble family: House of Hohenzollern
- Spouse: Susanna of Bavaria
- Issue: Marie of Brandenburg-Kulmbach, Electress Palatine; Catherine of Brandenburg-Kulmbach; Albert II Alcibiades, Margrave of Brandenburg-Kulmbach; Kunigunde of Brandenburg-Kulmbach, Margravine of Baden-Durlach; Frederick of Brandenburg-Kulmbach
- Father: Frederick I, Margrave of Brandenburg-Ansbach
- Mother: Sophia Jagiellon, Margravine of Brandenburg-Ansbach

Casimir (or Kasimir) of Brandenburg-Bayreuth (27 December 1481 – 21 September 1527) was Margrave of Bayreuth or Margrave of Brandenburg-Kulmbach from 1515 to 1527.

== Life ==
=== Family background ===
Casimir was born in Ansbach, as the son of Frederick I, Margrave of Brandenburg-Ansbach and his wife Princess Sofia Jagiellon, a daughter of King Casimir IV Jagiellon of Poland.

From 1498, Casimir's father Frederick granted him the position of stadtholder of the margraviate during his extensive travels. He ruled under the guidance of experienced advisors. In 1515, Casimir and his younger brother George deposed their father, who had greatly burdened the finances of the margraviate with his lavish lifestyle. Casimir then locked up his father at his residence at Plassenburg Castle, in a tower room from which his father could not escape for 12 years. He took up the rule of the Margraviate of Brandenburg-Kulmbach while his brother George ruled the Margraviate of Brandenburg-Ansbach. However, since his younger brother often stayed at the Hungarian royal court, Casimir ruled Brandenburg-Ansbach on his behalf.

The overthrow of his father outraged Casimir's other brothers and led to far-reaching political countermeasures. When Elector Joachim I of Brandenburg visited Kulmbach during his journey to Augsburg, and wanted to plead for the release of Casimir's father, he was denied access to Plassenburg Castle. The Elector's brother, Albert of Brandenburg, then turned against him and sided with Emperor Charles V, and was rewarded with a cardinal's hat. The dispute was resolved when an agreement was reached in 1522, in which the demands of the other brothers of Casimir were met.

Margrave Casimir died at Buda in 1527. At that point, his brother George took up the regency of Brandenburg-Kulmbach until Casimir's eldest son, Albert II Alcibiades, came of age in 1541.

=== Involvement in the Swabian League ===
Casimir was a vassal of Emperor Maximilian I and fought in 1499 alongside his father and Margrave Christopher I of Baden as the commander of the Swabian League against the Old Swiss Confederacy and led the negotiations that resulted in the Peace of Basel. In subsequent years, he continued to be active as a military leader and diplomat in Habsburg service. He participated in 1506 in Schwäbisch Hall against the Swabian League and in 1509 in the Diet at Worms. In 1513, he was imperial commissioner at the assembly of the Swabian League at Nördlingen dealing with a breach of the peace by Götz von Berlichingen. Casimir and Duke William IV of Bavaria jointly oversaw the conduct of the war. In 1519, he took part in federal measures against Ulrich of Württemberg; in May 1519, he commanded 700 knights advancing to Ehningen.

=== Disputes with the city of Nuremberg ===
Among the traditional arguments of the Burgraves and Margraves with the Imperial City of Nuremberg was a dispute in 1502 over the protection of the fair in Affalterbach. The City Council claimed to have the right to protect the enclave of Affalterbach itself and Casimir tried to prevent this. The situation developed in a political power game. Strong forces from Nuremberg had arrived in Affalterbach early. Casimir changed course and attacked suburbs of Nuremberg itself. The Nuremberg had to retreat from Affalterbach with heavy losses and surrender their banners, which were put on display in the church in Schwabach. This conflict has been immortalized in folk songs.

Casimir was later embroiled in border disputes with Nuremberg.

=== Franconian war ===
Casimir had been a leader of the Swabian League since 1499. In 1522, however, he cancelled his membership, when it became apparent that the Imperial City of Nuremberg, traditionally an enemy of the Burgrave of Nuremberg, and later the Margraves of Nuremberg, intended to start a war against Thomas von Absberg and his allies. The Franconian War broke out in 1523, and several castles of the robber barons were destroyed. The war was documented by Hans Wandereisen in a series of woodcuts.

=== Peasants' War ===
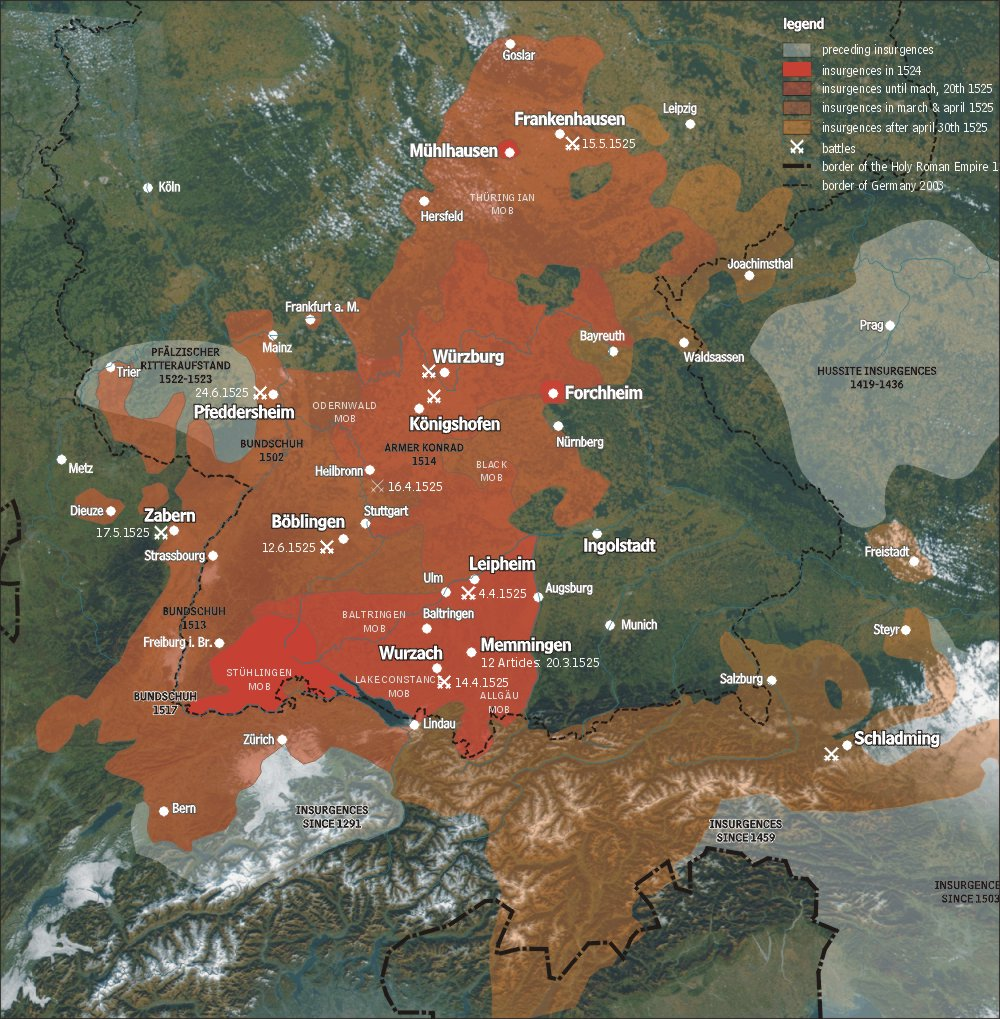
Map of the spread of the riots during the German Peasants' War in 1525

The first actions of the German Peasants' War in 1525 were incursions into the neighboring Bishopric of Würzburg under Bishop Conrad II of Thüngen and into the Bishopric of Bamberg under Bishop Weigand of Redwitz. In the spring of 1525 Casimir and the neighboring princes met in Neustadt an der Aisch to discuss a common response to the riots that threatened to spill over from Swabia into the Odenwald. The discussions were attended by Casimir and the two bishops and the Prince Bishop of Eichstätt and by Count Albert of Hohenlohe-Neuenstein, George of Waldburg and the counts of Limburg, Wertheim, Henneberg and Castell. The proceedings were derailed by mistrust, caused by cheating at the boundaries of their principalities. Casimir opposed the Reformation, unlike his brother George, who supported it. The assault of the peasants and the Black Company overwhelmed the Bishopric of Würzburg. The bishop fled and the defenders retreated to the Fortress Marienberg in Würzburg.

Under considerable financial and personal efforts, Casimir prepared to repel the incursions into his territory. He summoned his subjects to arms and hired mercenaries. The Margrave had the duty to protect the free imperial city of Rothenburg ob der Tauber. At Rothenburg, Casimir won his first victory over the peasants, and left the city with a rich booty. Shortly afterwards, however, the city council bowed for the citizens, who came to an arrangement with the peasants. The riots spread from Rothenburg into Casimir's territory, into the districts of Crailsheim, Lobenhausen-Anhausen, Werdeck-Gerabronn and Bamberg-Wiesenbach. Casimir withdrew to Ansbach and dug in. He tried to raise new troops in Upper Franconia, but they revolted. So Casimir was limited to using Bohemian mercenaries to defend his most fortified castles.

The unorganized peasant armies were defeated in the Würzburg area by a coalition of the Swabian League and other allies of the bishop of Würzburg. Their resistance and morale collapsed due to their massive losses. Casimir, whose actions had earned him the nickname "Bloodhound", gained the upper hand. Rebel villages, most of whom surrendered without resistance, were pillaged and looted. Casimir also devastated villages in his own territory: he had entire villages burned down, and rebels were executed. Reportedly, he had 300 people killed in Feuchtwangen alone. In Kitzingen, he wanted to set an example: he promised the bailiff Louis von Hutten that the lives of the residents would be spared. After they surrendered, however, he punished them hard by chopping off their right hand index and middle fingers (the "oath fingers") and blinded them and sent them into exile. His "captain" Augustin stabbed the eyes of 58 people who had said they "wanted to see no more Margrave" before the rebellion. This act was even at the time seen as monstrous atrocities. He also punished Rothenburg and wrung territorial concessions from the city. Contemporary reports claim that the market squares of Rothenburg and Schweinfurt were dyed red by the blood of the beheaded rebels. Since Casimir was described as the imperial henchman, it can be assumed that he acted in accordance with the wishes of the Emperor or the Swabian League. He sent his brother John Albert to Bayreuth to punish the city for its lack of support when he was raising troops. He only ceased his punishments when it emerged in November 1526 that innocent people were affected as well.

=== Follower of the Habsburgs ===
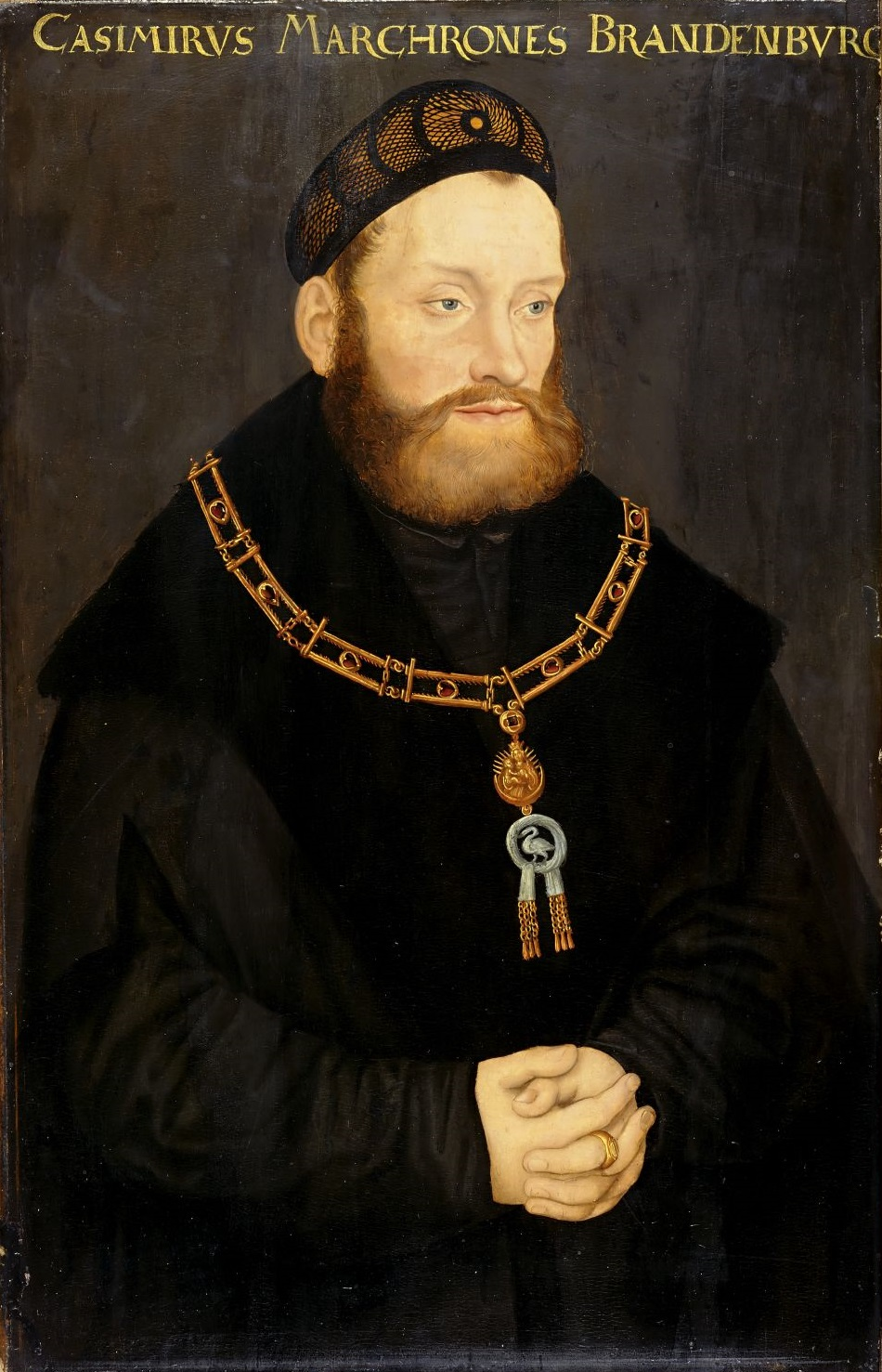
Portrait of Casimir wearing the Order of the Swan, workshop of Lucas Cranach the Elder

By participating as Imperial Commissioner in the diets in Augsburg in December 1525 and in Speyer in August 1526, Casimir once again proved his loyalty to the Habsburg imperial family.

At the coronation of the future German Emperor Ferdinand I as King of Bohemia in 1527, Casimir, who was seriously marked by disease, joined a military campaign in Hungary against John Zápolya. Because his brother George the Pious also joined, Casimir returned to appoint a stadtholder for their Franconian possessions and to raise additional troops. In July 1527, he reached the Hungarian border. The forts on the Danube surrendered to him, and he moved on to Buda. On 27 September 1527, he died of dysentery in Buda, in the presence of his brother George and King Ferdinand, to whom he entrusted the care of his five-year-old son Albert II Alcibiades. George ruled Brandenburg-Kulmbach while Albert was a minor.

Theodore Hirsch concludes his biography with the statement that because of the atrocities Casimir committed, so far no biographer had written a balanced description of his life.

== Marriage and issue ==
On 25 August 1518, Casimir married Susanna of Bavaria, the daughter of Duke Albert IV of Bavaria and Kunigunde of Austria. Emperor Maximilian I, the maternal uncle of the bride, also participated in the glamorous wedding in 1518, during the Diet of Augsburg. Casimir's close ties to the imperial family were visible again at the coronation of Emperor Charles V, where he was given the honor of being the First Cutter at the coronation dinner. After Casimir's death, his widow Susanna married (childlessly) her kinsman Otto Henry of Neuburg (in 1556-1559 the Elector Palatine), who treated Susanna's children like his own and promoted them.

Casimir and Susanna had:

- Marie of Brandenburg-Kulmbach (1519–1567), married in 1537, Elector Palatine Frederick III (1515–1576). They were the parents of Louis VI, Elector Palatine.
- Catherine of Brandenburg-Kulmbach (1520–1521)
- Albert II Alcibiades, Margrave of Brandenburg-Kulmbach (1522–1557)
- Kunigunde of Brandenburg-Kulmbach (1524–1558), married in 1551, Charles II, Margrave of Baden-Durlach (1529–1577)
- Frederick of Brandenburg-Kulmbach (1525)

== Sources ==
- Hohkamp, Michaela (2007). "Sisters, Aunts, and Cousins: Familial Architectures and the Political Field in Early Modern Europe". In Sabean, David Warren; Mathieu, Jon; Teuscher, Simon (eds.). Kinship in Europe: Approaches to Long-Term Development (1300-1900). Berghahn Books. ISBN 9780857456861.
- Theodolinde von Paschwitz, Markgraf Kasimir. Ein historischer Roman aus dem 16. Jahrhundert, Regensburg, 1910

Casimir, Margrave of Brandenburg-Kulmbach House of Hohenzollern Born: 27 December 1481 Died: 21 September 1527
| Preceded by Frederick I | Margrave of Brandenburg-Kulmbach; 1515–1527 | Succeeded by Albert Alcibiades |
