= Louis VI, Elector Palatine =

Elector Palatine from 1576 to 1583

Louis VI
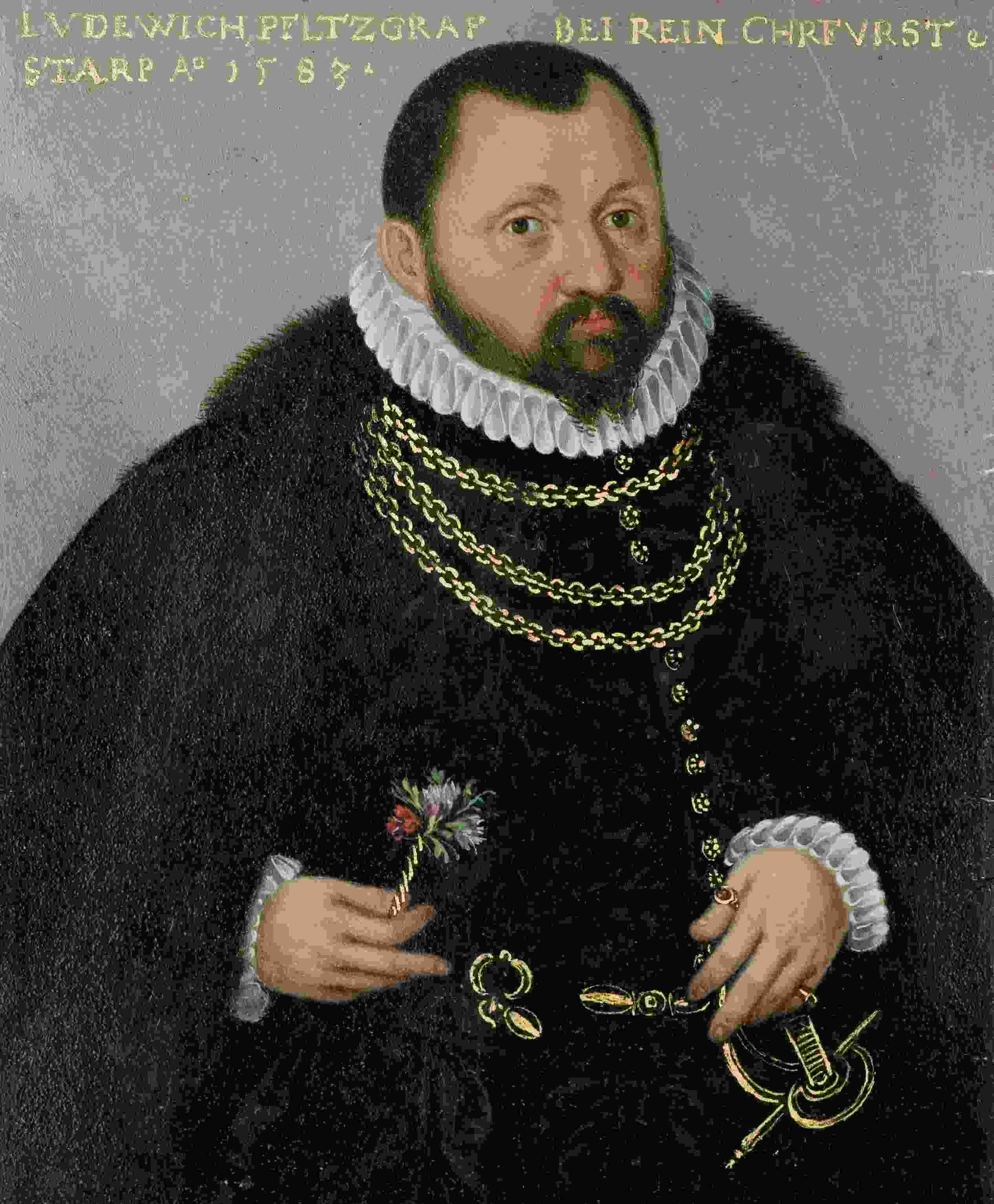
- Anonymous portrait, 16th century

Elector Palatine
- Reign: 26 October 1576 – 22 October 1583
- Predecessor: Frederick III
- Successor: Frederick IV
- Born: 4 July 1539; Simmern
- Died: 22 October 1583 (aged 44); Heidelberg
- Spouse: Elisabeth of Hesse (m. 1560; died 1582) Anne of Ostfriesland (m. 1583)
- Issue: Anna Marie, Duchess of Södermanland; Elisabeth; Dorothea Elisabeth; Dorothea; Frederick Philip; Johann Friedrich; Ludwig; Katharina; Christine; Frederick IV, Elector Palatine; Philip; Elisabeth
- House: Wittelsbach
- Father: Frederick III, Elector Palatine
- Mother: Marie of Brandenburg-Kulmbach

Louis VI, Elector Palatine (4 July 1539 in Simmern – 22 October 1583 in Heidelberg), was an Elector from the Palatinate-Simmern branch of the house of Wittelsbach. He was the first-born son of Frederick III, Elector Palatine and Marie of Brandenburg-Kulmbach.

== Biography ==
To learn French, the young prince Ludwig visited the Burgundian University of Dole in 1554. As presumptive heir of the Electorate in the Palatinate, he was already participating in government affairs at the court of Otto Henry, Elector Palatine. Since 1563, he was governor of the Upper Palatinate.

Unlike his father, he gave preference to Lutheranism over Calvinism, replacing Calvinists from positions at the University of Heidelberg. The Calvinist theologians found protection at the court of Prince John Casimir, the brother of Ludwig, in Neustadt an der Weinstrasse and established the "Casimirianum Neustadt". During the Cologne War Louis VI was the only Lutheran imperial prince who stood on the side of Cologne's Elector and Archbishop Gebhard Truchsess von Waldburg. With the Lutheran reorganization of the country Louis adopted a new court constitution, a police constitution and in 1582, a grand country constitution.

== Family and children ==
Ludwig VI was married twice. First, on 8 July 1560, he married Elisabeth of Hesse (13 February 1539 – 14 March 1582). They had the following children:

1. Anna Marie (b. Heidelberg, 24 July 1561 - d. Eskilstuna, 29 July 1589), married Charles IX of Sweden
2. Elisabeth (b. Heidelberg, 15 June 1562 - d. Heidelberg, 2 November 1562).
3. Dorothea Elisabeth (b. Jagdschloß Deinschwang, 12 January 1565 - d. Jagdschloß Deinschwang, 7 March 1565).
4. Dorothea (b. Amberg, 4 August 1566 - d. Amberg, 10 March 1568).
5. Frederick Philip (b. Amberg, 19 October 1567 - d. Amberg, 14 November 1568).
6. Johann Friedrich (b. Amberg, 17 February 1569 - d. Amberg, 20 March 1569).
7. Ludwig (b. Amberg, 30 December 1570 - d. Amberg, 7 May 1571).
8. Katharina (b. Amberg, April 1572 - d. Amberg, 16 October 1586), died young.
9. Christine (b. Schloß Hirschwald, 6 January 1573 - d. Zweibrücken, 21 July 1619), unmarried.
10. Frederick IV, Elector Palatine (b. Amberg, 5 March 1574 - d. Heidelberg, 9 September 1610).
11. Philip (b. Amberg, 4 May 1575 - d. Amberg, 9 August 1575).
12. Elisabeth (b. Amberg, 24 November 1576 - d. Heidelberg, 10 April 1577).

Second, he married on 12 July 1583 Countess Anne of Ostfriesland (26 June 1562 – 21 April 1621), but they had no children.

== Sources ==
- Cook, Chris; Broadhead, Philip (2012). The Routledge Companion to Early Modern Europe, 1453-1763. Routledge.
- Jeffery, Renée (2018). Princess Elisabeth of Bohemia: The Philosopher Princess. Lexington Books.
- Thomas, Andrew L. (2010). A House Divided: Wittelsbach Confessional Court Cultures in the Holy Roman Empire, C. 1550-1650. Brill.

Louis VI, Elector Palatine House of Wittelsbach Born: 1539 Died: 1583
Regnal titles
Preceded by Frederick III	Elector Palatine; 1576 – 1583	Succeeded by Frederick IV
