= Philipp Ludwig, Count Palatine of Neuburg =

Count Palatine of Neuburg from 1569 to 1614

Philipp Ludwig
- Count Palatine of Neuburg
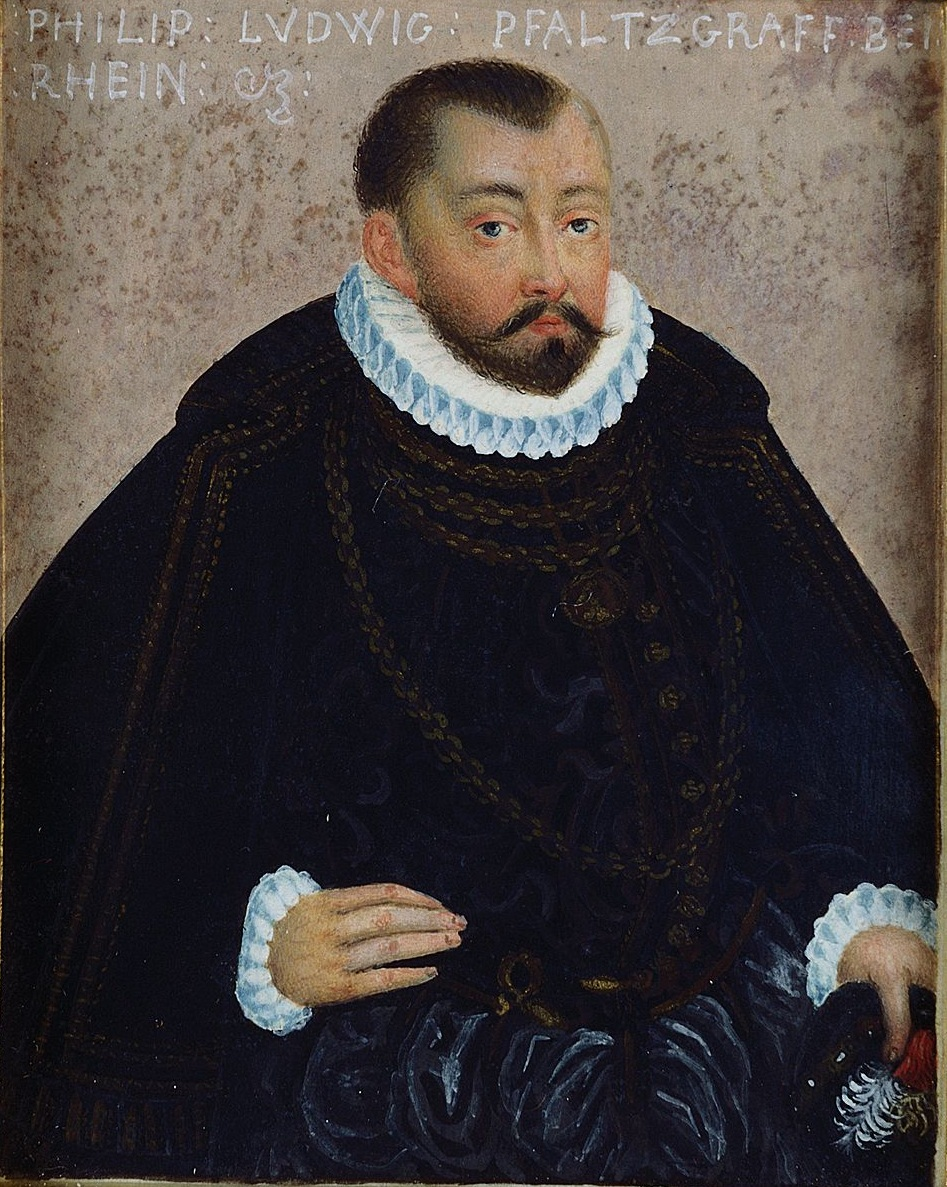
- Portrait c. 1593–97
- Born: 2 October 1547; Zweibrücken
- Died: 22 August 1614 (aged 66); Neuburg an der Donau
- Spouse: Anna of Cleves (m. 1574)
- Issue Detail: Anna Maria, Duchess of Saxe-Weimar; Countess Palatine Dorothea Sabine of Neuburg; Wolfgang Wilhelm, Count Palatine of Neuburg; Augustus, Count Palatine of Sulzbach; Countess Amalia Hedwig of Neuburg; Johann Friedrich, Count Palatine of Sulzbach-Hilpoltstein
- House: Wittelsbach
- Father: Wolfgang, Count Palatine of Zweibrücken
- Mother: Anna of Hesse

Philipp Ludwig of Neuburg (2 October 1547 – 22 August 1614) was Count Palatine of Neuburg from 1569 until 1614.

== Life ==
Philipp Ludwig was born in Zweibrücken in 1547 as the eldest son of Wolfgang, Count Palatine of Zweibrücken. After his father's death in 1569, his lands were partitioned between Philipp Ludwig and his four brothers - Philipp Ludwig received the Duchy of Neuburg. He married Anna (1552–1632), daughter of Duke Wilhelm IV "the Rich" of Jülich-Cleves-Berg, in 1574 and used the marriage as the basis of his claim to inherit the duchies in the succession controversy against the Elector of Brandenburg after William IV's only son, John William, died without heirs. In 1613 Philip Louis's eldest son, Wolfgang Wilhelm, converted to Catholicism and gained the support of Spain and the Catholic League, while Brandenburg received the support of the Netherlands.

The conversion of his son and heir was very difficult for the staunchly Lutheran Philipp Ludwig. He died in Neuburg in 1614 and was buried in Lauingen, succeeded by his son Wolfgang Wilhelm as Count Palatine of Neuburg. By the Treaty of Xanten in 1614 the duchies were partitioned following the War of the Jülich Succession, with Wolfgang Wilhelm receiving the Duchies of Jülich and Berg.

== Family ==
Philipp Ludwig married Anna of Cleves, daughter of Wilhelm, Duke of Jülich-Cleves-Berg on 27 September 1574. They had:

1. Anna Maria (18 August 1575 – 11 February 1643), married on September 9, 1591 to Friedrich Wilhelm I, Duke of Saxe-Weimar.
2. Dorothea Sabine (13 October 1576 – 12 December 1598). (Note: Her burial gown is one of the few complete women's garments from the sixteenth century to have survived and is preserved in the Bayerisches National Museum in Munich.)
3. Wolfgang Wilhelm, Count Palatine of Neuburg (25 October 1578 – 20 March 1653)
4. Otto Henry (28 October 1580 – 2 March 1581)
5. Augustus, Count Palatine of Sulzbach (2 October 1582 – 14 August 1632)
6. Amalia Hedwig (24 December 1584 – 15 August 1607)
7. Johann Friedrich, Count Palatine of Sulzbach-Hilpoltstein (23 August 1587 – 19 October 1644)
8. Sophie Barbara (3 April 1590 – 21 December 1591)

== Sources ==
- Asch, Ronald (1997). The Thirty Years War: The Holy Roman Empire and Europe 1618-48. Palgrave Macmillan. ISBN 978-0312165857.
- Grant, Arthur James (1938). A History of Europe from 1494 to 1610. Methuen & Co Ltd.

Philipp Ludwig, Count Palatine of Neuburg House of Wittelsbach Born: 1547 Died: 1614
Regnal titles
Preceded by Wolfgang	Count Palatine of Neuburg; 1569–1614	Succeeded by Wolfgang William
Preceded by William IV	Duke of Jülich and Berg; 1614	Succeeded by Wolfgang William
Preceded by Otto Henry	Count Palatine of Sulzbach; 1604–1614	Succeeded by Augustus
Preceded by Otto Henry	Count Palatine of Sulzbach; 1604–1614	Succeeded by John Frederick
