= John Frederick, Duke of Saxe-Weimar =

German aristocrat

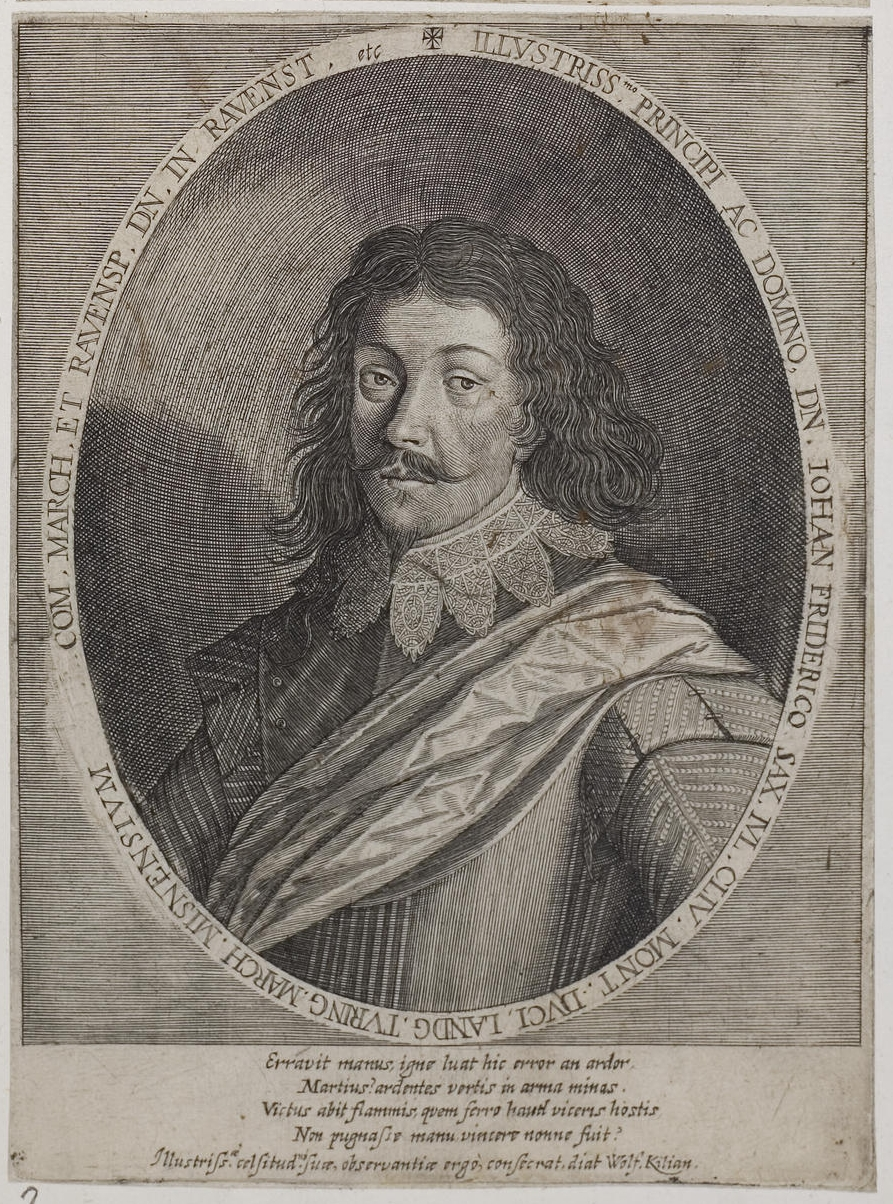
- Born: 19 September 1600; Altenburg
- Died: 17 October 1628 (aged 28); Weimar
- House: House of Wettin
- Father: John II, Duke of Saxe-Weimar
- Mother: Dorothea Maria of Anhalt

Duke John Frederick of Saxe-Weimar (19 September 1600 – 17 October 1628) was a Duke of Saxe-Weimar.

== Life ==
John Frederick was a son of Duke John II of Saxe-Weimar and his wife Dorothea Maria of Anhalt. His brothers were the Dukes John Ernest I "the Younger" of Saxe-Weimar, Frederick of Saxe-Weimar, William IV of Saxe-Weimar, Albert IV of Saxe-Eisenach, Ernest I of Saxe-Gotha and Bernhard of Saxe-Weimar.

John Frederick enjoyed a comprehensive education from Chamberlain Kaspar von Teutleben and Councillor Friedrich Hortleder. He did not follow his brothers to University. He did, however, accompany his brother Albert IV of Saxe-Eisenach in 1619 on his Grand Tour through France and Switzerland. They were accompanied by Hofmeister Hans Bernd von Botzheim and Councillor Tobias Adami.

John Frederick, like his brother Albert, was made a member of the Fruitbearing Society by Prince Louis I of Anhalt-Köthen, before the start of their Grand Tour. Louis gave John Frederick the nickname der Entzündete ("the Inflamed") and the motto verderbet und erhält ("spoil and receive"). His emblem was "stubbles in the field, set on fire, half burned".

In 1622, John Frederick and his brother Bernhard fought in the Battle of Wimpfen on the side of Baden. Three years later, his brother John Ernest the Younger promoted him to Colonel. Later that year, a power struggle between the brothers escalated for political reasons. It ended when John Frederick was arrested. He was later released. However, in 1627 he attempted to join the army of Tilly. He was caught, and again imprisoned by his brothers.

John Frederick was very interested in Alchemy all his life. On 16 October 1628, while still in prison, he confessed, in writing, to a pact with the devil. The next day, he was found dead in his cell. Speculations ranged from suicide to murder; neither was ever conclusively proven. A witch trial against him was never started.
