= Duke Frederick of Saxe-Weimar =

Colonel in the 30 Years War (1596-1622)

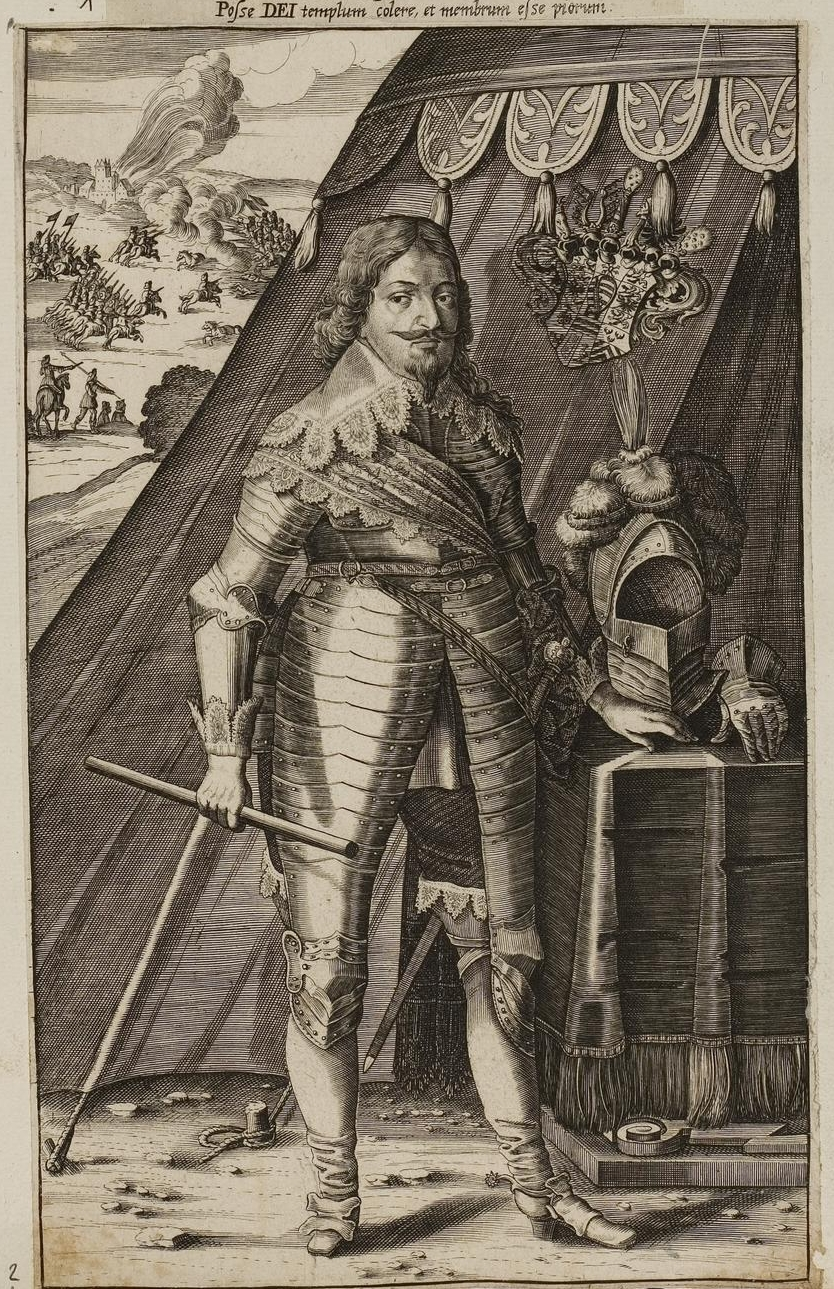
- 17th-century engraving
- Born: 1 March 1596; Altenburg
- Died: 29 August 1622 (aged 26); Fleurus, Belgium
- House: House of Wettin
- Father: John II, Duke of Saxe-Weimar
- Mother: Dorothea Maria of Anhalt

Duke Frederick of Saxe-Weimar (1 March 1596 in Altenburg – 29 August 1622 in Fleurus, Belgium) was a prince from the Ernestine branch of the House of Wettin and a Colonel in the Thirty Years' War.

== Life ==
Duke Frederick was the son of John II of Saxe-Weimar and his wife Dorothea Maria of Anhalt, sister of Prince Louis I of Anhalt-Köthen. His brothers were the Dukes John Ernest the Younger of Saxe-Weimar, William IV of Saxe-Weimar, Albert of Saxe-Eisenach, John Frederick of Saxe-Weimar, Ernest I of Saxe-Gotha, and Bernhard of Saxe-Weimar.

With his older brother, Duke John Ernest the Younger, he received his first lessons from the tutor and Hofmeister Friedrich von Kospoth. He also studied in Jena, like his brothers John Ernest the Younger and Frederick.

The Fruitbearing Society was founded on 24 August 1617 at Hornstein Castle (now Williamsburg Castle). Frederick was a founding member. Prince Louis I of Anhalt-Köthen gave him the nickname der Hoffende ('"the Hopeful'") and the motto it will be so. His emblem was a half-ripe cherry, hanging on the three. In the register of the Society at Köthen, he is registered as number 4.

A few weeks later, Duke Frederick began his Grand Tour. This led him via France to Britain and back through the Netherlands. He returned home in 1619.

He fought on the Protestant side in the Thirty Years' War, together with his brothers John Ernest the Younger, John Frederick, and William IV. He served as a colonel under Ernst von Mansfeld. In the regiment of Christian the Younger of Brunswick, he tried to break through the blockade of the Spanish troops during the Battle of Fleurus and was fatally wounded. He died the next day, aged 26.
