= Dorothea Maria of Anhalt =

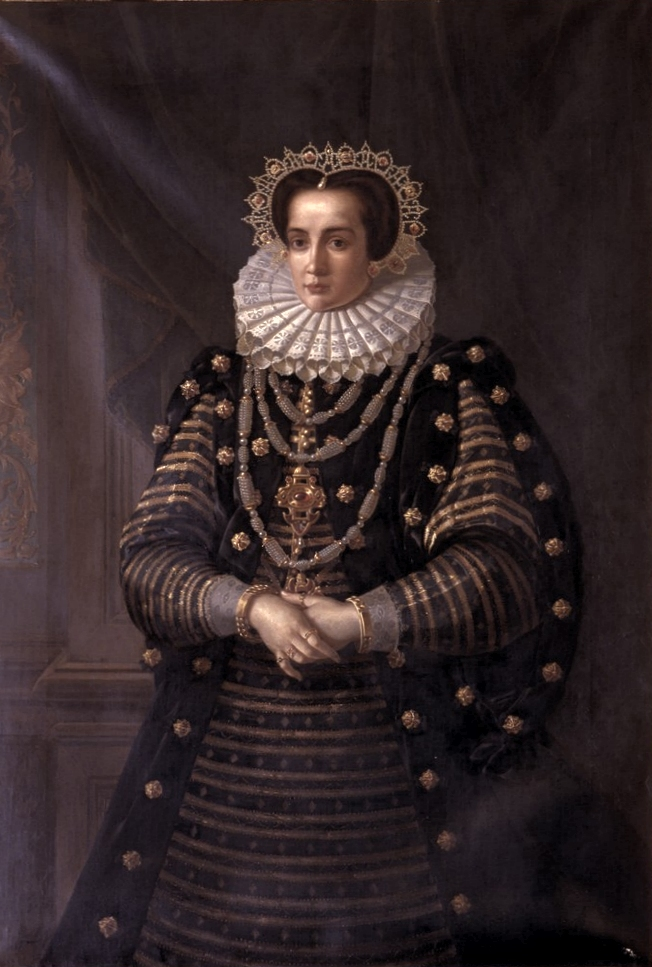
- Posthumous portrait

Duchess consort of Saxe-Weimar
- Tenure: 7 July 1602 – 18 July 1605
- Born: 2 July 1574; Dessau
- Died: 18 July 1617 (aged 43); Weimar
- Burial: Schloss Hornstein
- Spouse: John II, Duke of Saxe-Weimar (m. 1593; died 1605)
- Issue: Johann Ernst I, Duke of Saxe-Weimar; Prince Christian Wilhelm; Prince Frederick; Prince Johann; Wilhelm, Duke of Saxe-Weimar; Albrecht, Duke of Saxe-Eisenach; Prince John Frederick; Ernest I, Duke of Saxe-Gotha; Prince Frederick Wilhelm; Prince Bernhard; Princess Johanna
Names
- Sophie Dorothea Maria of Anhalt
- House: House of Wettin; House of Ascania
- Father: Joachim Ernest, Prince of Anhalt
- Mother: Eleonore of Württemberg

Dorothea Maria of Anhalt (Dessau, 2 July 1574 – Weimar, 18 July 1617), was by birth a member of the House of Ascania and princess of Anhalt. After her marriage, she became Duchess of Saxe-Weimar.

Dorothea Maria was the sixth daughter of Joachim Ernest, Prince of Anhalt, but second-born daughter with his second wife Eleonore, daughter of Christoph, Duke of Württemberg.

== Life ==
In 1586, the twelve-year-old Dorothea Maria was chosen by her father as Abbess of Gernrode and Frose as the successor to her elder sister Agnes Hedwig.

In 1593 she was relieved of her post as abbess in order to marry John II, Duke of Saxe-Weimar. The wedding took place in Altenburg on 7 January of that year. Her successor as abbess was her niece, Sophie Elisabeth, eldest daughter of her half-brother John George I, Prince of Anhalt-Dessau.

Dorothea Maria was constantly pregnant during the twelve years of her marriage, giving birth almost once a year. She and her husband had twelve children (the last one was born after his death)

1. John Ernest I, Duke of Saxe-Weimar (b. Altenburg, 21 February 1594 – d. Sankt Martin, Hungary, 6 December 1626).
2. Christian William (b. and d. Altenburg, 6 April 1595).
3. Frederick (b. Altenburg, 1 March 1596 – killed in battle, Fleurus, Belgium, 19 August 1622).
4. John (b. Weimar, 31 March 1597 – d. Weimar, 6 October 1604), died in childhood.
5. William, Duke of Saxe-Weimar (b. Altenburg, 11 April 1598 – d. Weimar, 17 May 1662)
6. Stillborn son (Altenburg, 11 April 1598), twin of William.
7. Albert IV, Duke of Saxe-Eisenach (b. Altenburg, 27 July 1599 – d. Eisenach, 20 December 1644).
8. John Frederick (b. Altenburg, 19 September 1600 – d. Weimar, 17 October 1628).
9. Ernest I, Duke of Saxe-Gotha (b. Altenburg, 25 December 1601 – d. Schloss Friedenstein, Gotha, 26 March 1675)
10. Frederick William (b. Weimar, 7 February 1603 – d. Georgenthal, 16 August 1619), died unmarried.
11. Bernhard (b. Weimar, 6 August 1604 – d. Neuenburg, 18 July 1639), Count of Franken (1633).
12. Johanna (b. posthumously, Weimar, 14 April 1606 – d. Weimar, 3 July 1609), died in childhood.

Dorothea Maria died of injuries sustained while riding a horse. Her funeral took place on 24 August 1617 at Schloss Hornstein (later Wilhelmsburg Castle). On this occasion, the Fruitbearing Society was created and her younger brother, Louis of Anhalt-Köthen, was appointed its first leader.

== Sources ==
- Hanham, Andrew (2004). "Caroline of Brandenburg-Ansbach and the 'anglicisation' of the House of Hanover". In Orr, Clarissa Campbell (ed.). Queenship in Europe 1660-1815: The Role of the Consort. pp. 276–299. ISBN 9780521814225.

Dorothea Maria of Anhalt House of Ascania Born: 2 July 1574 Died: 18 July 1617
German royalty
Preceded by Anna Maria of the Palatinate-Neuburg	Duchess consort of Saxe-Weimar; 7 July 1602 – 18 July 1605	Vacant Title next held by Eleonore Dorothea of Anhalt-Dessau
Religious titles
Preceded by Agnes Hedwig of Anhalt	Abbess of Gernrode and Frose; 1586 – 18 July 1605	Succeeded by Sophie Elisabeth of Anhalt-Dessau
