= Battle of Rheinfelden =

1638 battle of the Thirty Years' War

Coordinates: 47°33′N 7°48′E

- Part of the Thirty Years' War and Bernard's Upper Rhine Campaign
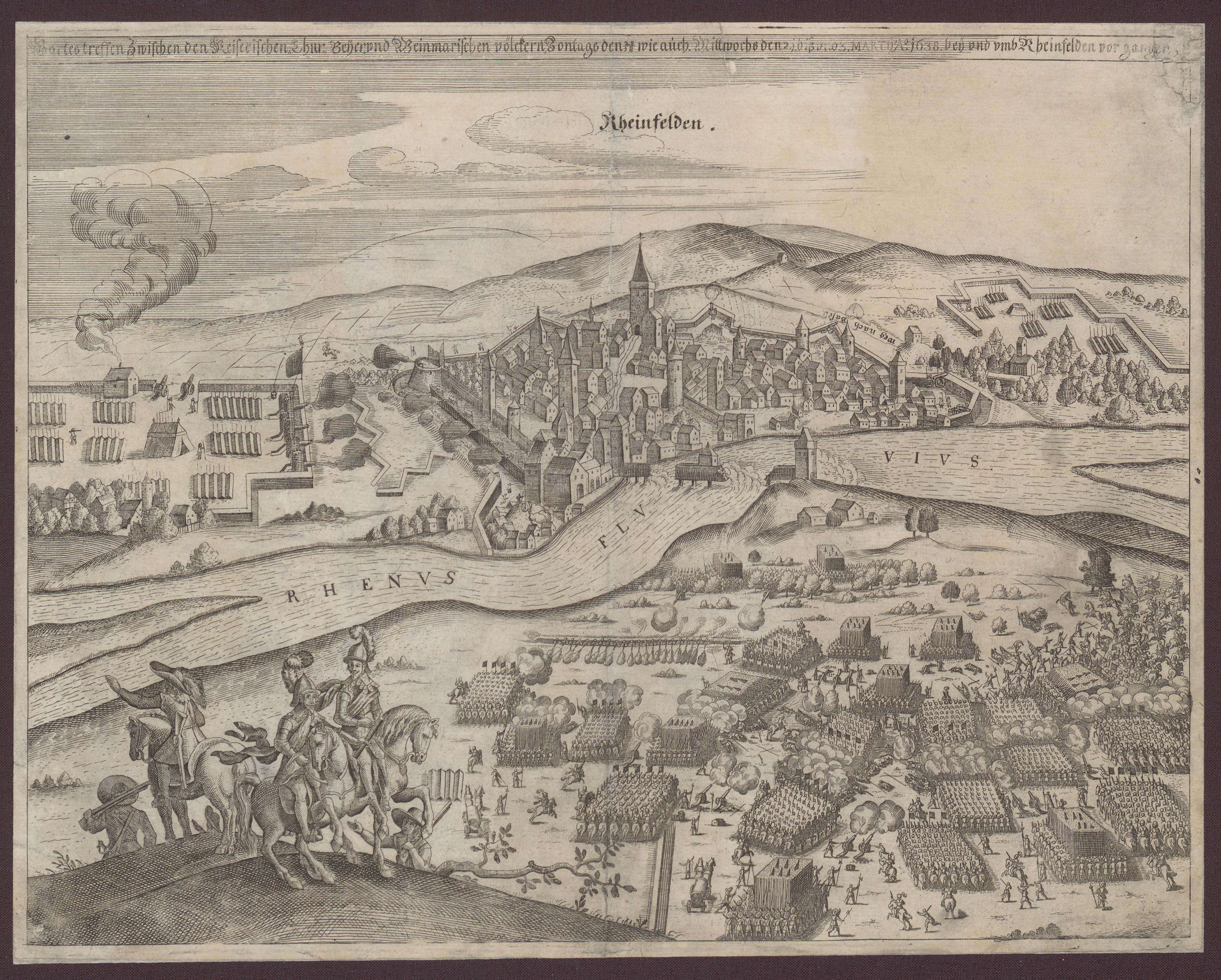
Date	1st Battle: 28 February 1638; 2nd Battle: 3 March 1638
Location	1st Battle: North of river Rhine, NE of Rheinfelden, near Basel (present-day Germany); 2nd Battle: S of Rhine, E of Rheinfelden (present day Switzerland)
Result	French-Weimaran victory

Belligerents
France; Weimar Army	Holy Roman Empire; Bavaria

Commanders and leaders
Bernhard of Saxe-Weimar	(Holy Roman Empire) Federico Savelli (POW) (Electorate of Bavaria) Johann von Werth (POW)

Strength
5,000–6,000 men 14 guns	4,000–7,000 men

Casualties and losses
400	3,000–3,500 500 killed 3,000 captured

The Battle of Rheinfelden (28 February and 3 March 1638) was a military event in the course of the Thirty Years' War, consisting in fact of two battles to the north and south of the present-day town of Rheinfelden. On one side was a French-allied mercenary army led by Bernhard of Saxe-Weimar while the other side consisted of a joint Bavarian and Holy Roman Empire army and led by Johann von Werth and Federico Savelli. Bernhard was beaten in the first battle but managed to defeat and capture Werth and Savelli in the second.

== Prelude ==
Following the Swedish defeat at the Battle of Nördlingen in 1634, Bernhard's mercenary army had come under the pay of France. Having been pushed to the west bank of the Rhine by the Imperial advance, Bernhard's army had settled in Alsace during 1635 and had done little except help repulse the Imperial invasion of France under the Cardinal-Infante Ferdinand and Matthias Gallas in 1636.

Early in February 1638, having been prodded by the French government, Bernhard advanced his army of 6,000 men and 14 guns to the Rhine in order to find a crossing. Arriving at an important crossing point at the town of Rheinfelden, Bernhard prepared to invest the town from the south. Meanwhile, he would use the ferry at Beuggen to throw troops across the river in order to complete the investment from the north. The attack on the town was to be made on 1 March.

In order to prevent this, the Imperialists, under the Italian mercenary Count Federico Savelli and German general Johann von Werth, moved through the Black Forest to attack Bernhard's army and relieve the town.

== The First Battle ==
The advance guard of the Imperial army, having advanced down the right bank of the river, was pushed back by Bernhard. This gave him time to deploy more troops and artillery onto the north bank of the river. However, by the time Savelli appeared with the main body of his force only half of Bernhard's army had made it to the north bank.

Bernhard drew up his army to prevent Savelli from relieving the town. Savelli deployed the Imperial army of 7,000 men opposite Bernhard but because of the rough ground there was little chance for both armies to retain their formation. Savelli drove back Bernhard's left flank while on the opposite end of the field Bernhard routed the Imperial right. Like a revolving door both armies swung round giving Savelli the chance to capture the ferry and cut off Bernhard from his troops on the south bank. At the day's end, the armies were facing each other in the positions that the other had started the battle in.

== The Second Battle ==
Although the Imperialists held the field Bernhard's losses were not serious and he resolved to unite both parts of his army. Avoiding Imperialist detachments Bernhard marched east along the Rhine to the village of Laufenburg. There, having crossed the Rhine and united his army, Bernhard turned back towards Rheinfelden.

Believing Bernhard's army defeated and scattered, the Imperialist army failed to take precautions. Around 7 am on 3 March, Savelli's outposts were astonished to see Bernhard's army approaching and withdrew towards Rheinfelden to report Bernhard's presence as Savelli and Werth assembled their army in haste. Bernhard had his artillery fire three times into the Imperial ranks before a final charge broke the Imperialist army. Troops coming out of Rheinfelden to help were also trapped by Bernhard's army and forced to surrender.

Both Savelli and Werth were captured. Bernhard lost light while his opponent lost about 3,500 men at least. His victory enabled him to march north along the Rhine to initiate the siege of Breisach.

== Popular culture ==
In the 1970 movie The Last Valley, a mercenary captain (played by Michael Caine) and his band of fighters take up residence in a miraculously untouched Alpine valley, while at the same time providing protection for the valley from other war bands. Fearing the valley may be ravaged when large armies camp nearby, the captain takes his soldiers to assist Bernhard's army capture Rheinfelden, hoping thereby that the armies will leave the area. Their mission is a success, but in the struggle the captain is mortally wounded and many of his men killed.

== Sources ==
- Wilson, Peter (2011). The Thirty Years War: Europe's Tragedy. London: Belknap Press. ISBN 978-0-674-06231-3.
- Wedgewood, C.V. The Thirty Years War. pp. 404–406.
- Bodart, Gaston (1908). Militär-historisches Kriegs-Lexikon (1618–1905).
