= Jost Andreas von Randow =

Jost Andreas von Randow (* Loburg, 3. April 1580; † ?) was courtier at the Anhaltian court at Dessau and an early member of the Fruitbearing Society.

== Life ==
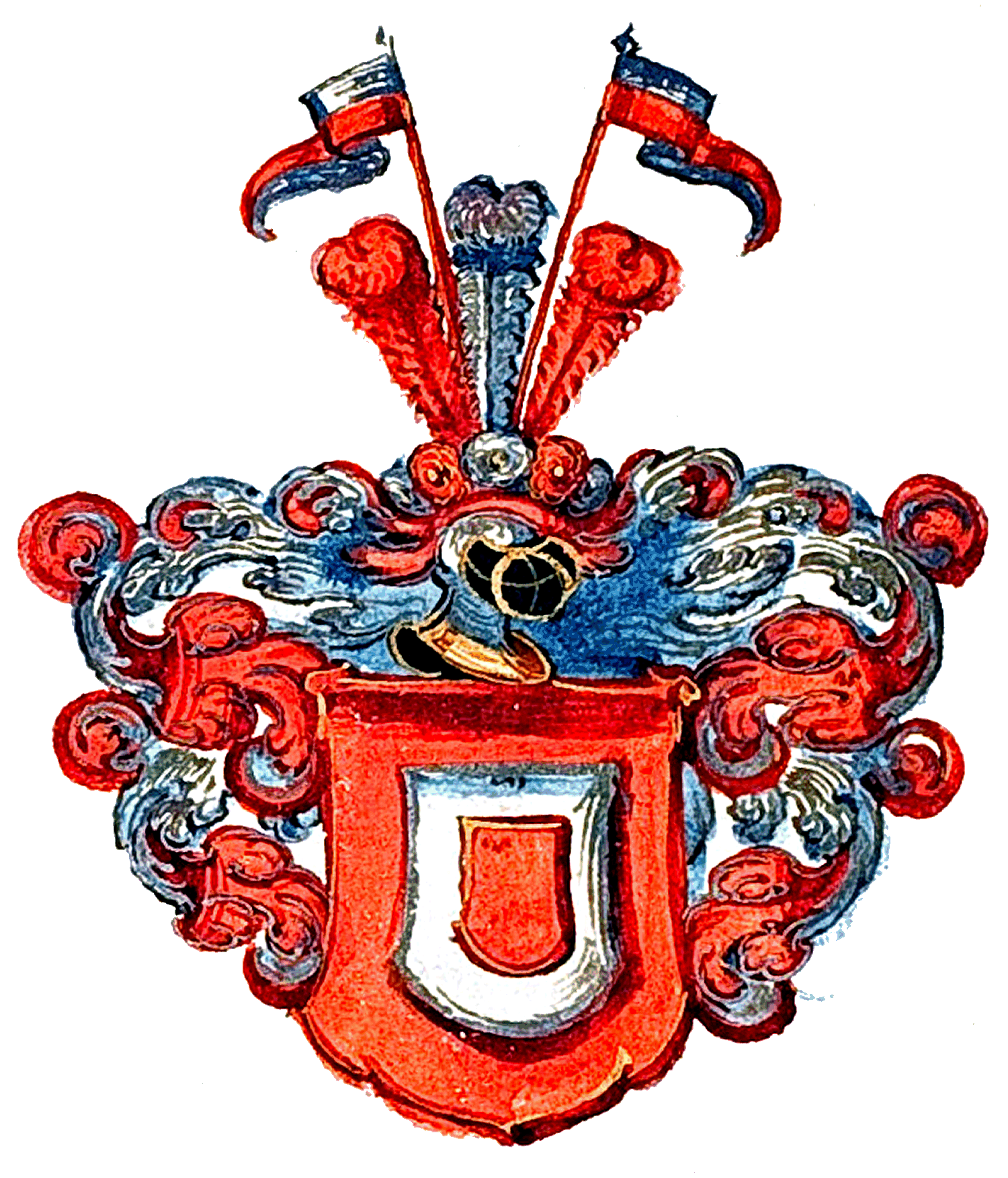
The coat of arms of Jost-Andreas von Randow

Jost Andreas von Randow (sometimes also von Randau) descended from an old noble family that hailed from the archbishopric of Magdeburg. He was the son of Caspar von Randow of Loburg († 1610) and of Elisabeth von Barby who hailed from the house of Kalitz († 1618). He was born on Easter Sunday 1580. His death date is unknown. Jost Andreas remained unmarried and was mentioned in documents until 1623, but must have lived longer.

In 1619 Randow became a member of the Fruitbearing Society, which had been founded in 1617 by Prince Ludwig I. of Anhalt-Köthen. As a society name her chose Der Leimende (The Glueing).

As an emblem Randow was given a half withered apple tree with branches partly covered by moss. In the membership register Randow has the number 22 meaning, that he was one of the earlier members. At its peak in 1650 the society hat 527 members.
