= Angelo Sala =

Italian physician and chemist

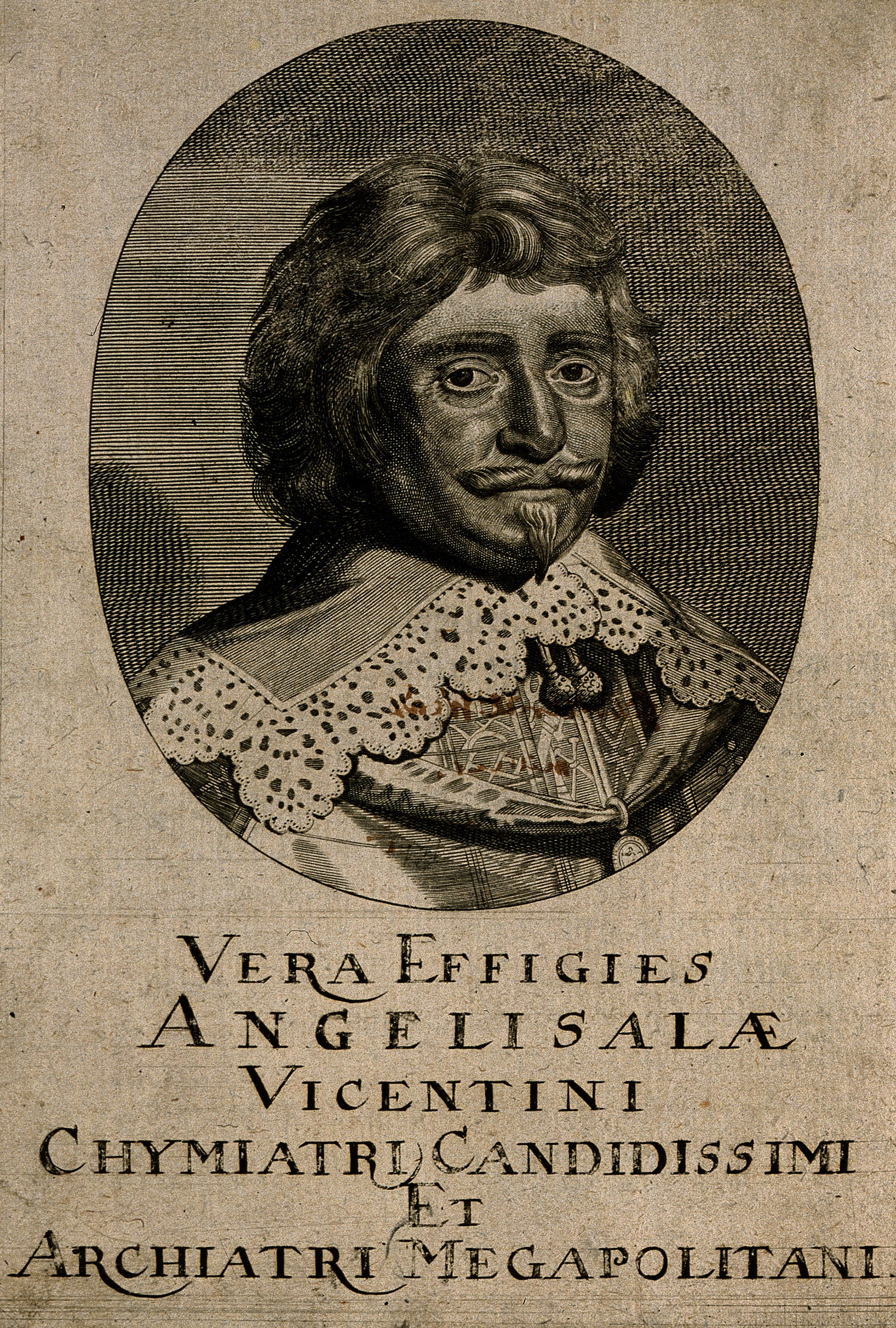
Engraved portrait of Angelo Sala, Latin inscription reads: "The true portrait of Angelisala of Venice, organic chemist and city court physician"

Angelo Sala (Latin: Angelus Sala) (21 March 1576, Vicenza – 2 October 1637, Bützow) was an Italian doctor and early iatrochemist. He promoted chemical remedies and, drawing on the relative merits of the conflicting chemical and Galenical systems of medicine, dismissed alchemical transmutation and 'universal medicine'; objected to tartar which had deliquesced being called an 'oil'; observed that metals reacted differently with acids; that sulphur extracted something from the air in order to burn; that silver nitrate darkened on exposure to light; surmised the existence of elementary (atomic) particles; and described newly discovered compounds and methods of preparation. Sala made the first studies on the formation of alcohol from fermenting musts and so is regarded as the founder of sugar chemistry.

== Biography ==
Sala was the son of the spinner Bernardino Sala. He probably first learned the profession of pharmacy in Venice. A Calvinist, he left Italy and his career as a medical doctor without academic studies led him to Dresden (1602), Sondrio (1604), Nuremberg (1606), Frauenfeld (1607) and settled in Geneva (1609). From 1607 to 1609 he was a city doctor in Winterthur.

=== Writings ===
Sala began publishing extensively in the disciplines of chemistry and medicines in about 1608-9, including a book of medications in 1624. He subscribed to corpuscular theory, asserting, for instance, that fermentation was a regrouping of elementary particles that resulted in the formation of new substances, an idea that was supported by Sala's experiments which provided evidence that the same substance persisted through a series of chemical changes, so that it could be assumed that minute atoms were the unchangeable parts that persisted through all the steps.

Sala would not let himself be misled by the illusions of the alchemists, as he asserts in many places in his works. In his treatise on the seven metals he reveals the gross artifice by which tin can be shown converting into silver: "Beware of the Crysopoeans who pledge to transform tin into silver. For [...] this crystal [silver nitrate] can be so cleverly conjoined with purified soda, unless the weight of the fallacy is detected," and also issues warning in "a brief demonstration of what vitriol is, or of what substances it is composed, and how much they deceive those who think that vitriol and water of vitriol can in fact transform iron into brass" Sala decomposed copper ('blue') vitriol into copper ash, acid spirit ('spirit of sulphur'), and water, proving its decomposition through recombining the materials into the original vitriol. Likewise he synthesised sal ammoniac from the 'spirit of salt' (hydrochloric acid) and the' volatile salt of urine' (ammonium carbonate). In Ternarius bezoardicorum he explicitly declares that he does not want to have anything in common with those of his colleagues "ensnared in vain hope" who still dream of the possibility of being able to obtain the philosopher's stone.

=== Paracelsianism ===
Italian Paracelsianism and chemical medicine from the mid-sixteenth century to the mid-seventeenth century, developed institutionally and intellectually with the introduction of chemical remedies in Italy. Paracelsian views were accepted wherever alchemy and practical chemistry were predominant, as in the Medici court in Florence. In Italy, Germany, England and France royal patronage supported Paracelsianism and new medicines were adopted by distillers, apothecaries and physicians. During this time, Sala advanced on Paracelsianism through his publishing in the new "chemical" medicine and the analysis of Vitriol, which he dedicated to the banker Bonaventura von Bodeck. The principle in chemistry that the names of a compound should indicate its constituents was recognised in Sala's suggestion that the residue of the calcination of green vitriol (i.e. ferric oxide) might be called Substantia Ferrea Vitrioli as an improvement on the Paracelsan colcothar.

=== Discovery of photo-sensitivity in silver ===
One of Sala's primary areas of study concerned chemical identity and change. In 1610 Sala accompanied Count Johann von Nassau as a field doctor and between 1612 and 1617 he worked in The Hague. His experiments at this time with silver nitrate and silver salts were an important step towards the invention of the photographic process; He introduced the alchemical name "magisterium argenti," or "crystalli Dianae," for silver nitrate, which he also called "lapis lunearis" and described in his Opera medica chimicae the smelting of silver nitrate.

In Septem planetarum terrestrium spagirica recensio (1614) he reported that "Si lapidem lunearem pulveratum ad solem exponas instar atramenti niggerimus" (When you expose powdered silver nitrate to sunlight, it turns black as ink), and also its effect on paper; silver nitrate wrapped in paper for a year turned black This discovery of the sun’s effect on powdered silver nitrate was not replicated by then "respected" scientists and was subsequently disregarded as having "no practical application," despite the use of silver nitrate in the practice of alchemy.

Robert Boyle made a similar observation later, but mistakenly believed that the darkening resulted from exposure to air, rather than light.

=== Germany ===
Sala was appointed as a personal physician of Count Anton Günther of Oldenburg who also appointed Sala as supervisor of the pharmacy system in the state of Oldenburg. In 1620 Sala went to Hamburg as a medical chemist. In June of that year, he became a personal physician of Count Ernst von Holstein-Schaumburg. In 1622, Maurice, Landgrave of Hesse-Kassel called him to Kassel and may also have recommended Sala to his son-in-law, Duke John Albert II, Duke of Mecklenburg, to whom Sala has served as a personal physician from about 1623. In any case, he installed Sala in Güstrow in 1625 to live and work in the castle.

At the end of May 1628, Sala accompanied Duke Johann Albrecht II, expelled by Wallenstein, into exile in Bernburg in Anhalt. On 26 June 1628 FürstLudwig I of Anhalt-Köthen admitted by him to the Fruchtbringende Gesellschaft at the same time as Johann Albrecht II and Otto von Preen. The prince gave Sala the title "der Lindernde" ("the soothing") and the motto "die Schmerzen" ("pain"). Sala took the chamomile blossom as his emblem. Sala's entry can be found at #160 in the Köthener Gesellschaftsbuch.

In the summer of 1629, Sala accompanied his duke into exile in Lübeck. There he remained as a personal physician until the death of the Duke in 1636, then served his son, Duke Gustav Adolf of Mecklenburg-Güstrow, in the same position.

== Teaching ==
Interrupted only by the ducal exile, Sala gave lectures on chemistry at the University of Rostock where Johann Rist was one of Sala's students. Peter Lauremberg, also a Paracelsianist at Rostock wrote a discussion of Sala's ideas. Lauremberg's polite questioning was answered polemically by Sala's later son-in-law Anton Günther Billich which escalated the dispute.

== Personal life ==
Sala married three times; first to Maria Ennan, who gave birth to a sole child, daughter Maria, who on 5 January 1608 was baptized in Winterthur. She later married the Oldenburg physician Anton Günther Billich, who was friends with Sala. However they divorced in 1634, Sala's granddaughter Marie Sophie was never recognized by Billich.

Sala married a second time in the German Reformed Community in Hamburg on the 15 April 1621, to Cornelia de L'Hommels.

His third marriage was with Katharina von Brockdorff (born 1608) in Lübeck in 1628. Their descendants were confirmed in the Reich through the nobility in which the Sala family had been established in Italy. Sala's great-grandson Gerd Carl Graf von Sala even achieved entry to the imperial count in 1751. However, the German Sala branch died out with his son Hans Christian in 1806.

Sala died on 2 October 1637 at the age of 61 in Bützow, after having cut himself three days earlier. He was buried on 20 October in the Cathedral of St. Maria, St. Johannes Evangelista and St. Cäcilia.

== Legacy ==
In 1625, Sala pursued his research interests in conjunction with his service as the personal physician. His research and discoveries led to a better understanding of chemical reactions and the realisation that some substances are composed of chemical combinations of other substances.

Sala's discovery of light-sensitivity of silver was advanced by other chemists before photography was finally achieved in the 1830s.

Sala was above all a practitioner. In his view, demonstrations could be carried out only through manual operations (inventionibus manualibus), that is to say, only with the aid of experimental examples, which he clearly distinguished from argumentation. For him, chemistry was still a handcraft (ars).

The Carl von Ossietzky University Oldenburg annually awards students of northern German schools with the Angelus Sala Prize for the "Day of Chemistry", for those in the 10th class who have achieved outstanding academic achievements in chemistry.

== Publications ==
Sala wrote his works in French and Italian, but most appeared translated in German, French and Latin editions. In them, he relied on practical-experimental foundations. In his late work, he distanced himself from Paracelsus.

- Sala, Angelo (1702). Tractatus II de variis tum chymicorum tum Galenistarum erroribus, in praeparatione medicinali commissis (in Latin). Francof. OCLC 68130934.
- Sala, Angelus (1622). Angeli Salae Vicentini Veneti Chymiatri celeberrimi Chrysologia, seu Examen auri chymicum: in quo demonstratur, auro nec inesse substantiam aliquam potabilem ... (in Latin). Hamburgi: Impensis Henr. Carstens. OCLC 690518246.
- Sala, Angelus (1614). Septem planetarum terrestrium spagirica recensio: qua perspicue declaratur ratio nominis hermetici, analogia metallorum cum microcosmo, eorum praeparatio vera & unica, proprietates, & usus medicinales (in Latin). Amsterodami: Apud Wilhelmum Ianssonium. OCLC 34709352.
- Sala, Angelus (1617). Angeli Salae ... Anatomia vitrioli : in duos tractatus divisa : in quibus vera ratio vitrioli in diversas substantias resolvendi accuratissimè traditur : accedit arcanorum complurium ex substantijs istis deductorum, tum ad conservandam valetudinem, tum ad gravissimorum morborum vim & intemperiem, sylva : omnia ex italicâ in latinam linguam translata, studio & operâ I.P.C.R. (in Latin). Lugduni Batavorum: Ex officina Godefridi Basson. OCLC 224532164.
- Sala, Angelus (1617). Anatomia antimonii: id est dissectio tam dogmatica quàm hermetica antimonii, vsum, proprietatem, et vires ejus declarans (in Latin). Leiden: Ex officinâ Godefridi Basson. OCLC 921295209.
- Sala, Angelus (1616). Ternarius bezoarticorum, ou, Trois souverains medicaments bezoardiques, contre tous venins et empoisonnements tant externes que internes, corruption de sang, & autres humeurs (in French). A Leyden: Chez Godefroy Basson. OCLC 28588236.
- Sala, Angelus (1620). Descriptio brevis antidoti pretiosi (in Latin). Marpurgum. OCLC 165847095.
- Sala, Angelus; Duveen Alchemy and Chemistry Collection (1622). D.O.M.A. Angeli Sala Vicentini Veneti chymiatri celeberrimi Chrysologia, sev, Examen auri chymicum: in quo demonstratur, auro nec inesse substantiam aliquam potabilem: nec illud arte spagyrica transmutari posse in substantiam aquosam, oleosam vel salinam; & quid propriè intelligatur per aurum potabile : adjecti sunt in fine ejusdem aphorismi chymiatrici recogniti (in Latin). Hamburgi: Impensis Henr. Carstens. OCLC 18319704.
- Sala, Angelus (1625). Angeli Salae Vicentini Veneti Chymiatri candidissimi De Natura, Proprietatibus & usu Spiritus Vitrioli Fundamentalis Dissertatio Oder Gründliche Beschreibung, was Spiritus Vitrioli eigentlich sey: Wie ungründtlich er von etzlichen Medicis für ein schädlich Medicament gescholten und verworffen wird; Und dagegen Was für treffliche Eigenschafften und Wirckungen er habe, und wie man ihn wider mancherley Leibs Kranckheit mit grossem Nutz gebrauchen solle (in German). Hamburgi: Froben. OCLC 165151323.
- Sala, Angelus (1979). Processus de auro potabili, novo, paucisque adhuc cognito: cui q idam alii ex Basilii Valentini, Iosephi Quercetant, Porta, & aliorum scriptis excerpti (in Latin). Argentorati: Sumptibus J. Philippi. OCLC 6836738.
- Sala, Angelus (1633). Hydrelaeologia (in Latin). Rostochium. OCLC 165847106.
- Sala, Angelus (1635). Angeli Salae Essentiarum vegetabilium anatome : darinnen von den fürtrefflichsten Nutzbarkeiten der Vegetabilischen Essentzen in der Artzney ... gelehret und gehandelt wird ... (in German). Rostock: Hallervord. OCLC 179803724.
- Sala, Angelus (1636). Tartarologia. Das ist: Von der Natur und Eigenschafft des Weinsteins; welcher Gestalt auss demselben underschiedliche hochbewehrte Medicamenten zu bereiten ... (in German). Rostock: Gedruckt bey Jochim Fuessen s. Wittwen, in Vorlegung Joh. Hallervords. OCLC 14298149.
- Sala, Angelus (1637). Angeli Salæ ... Saccharologia, darinnen ... von der Natur, qualiteten, nützlichem Gebrauch, vnd schädlichem Missbrauch des Zuckers ... beschrieben vnd angezeiget wird (in German). Rostock: In Verlegung Johann Hallervordts, gedruckt bey Nicolao Keyl. OCLC 1287662536.
- Sala, Angelus; Horst, Gregor (Arzt (1641). Tractatus de praeservatione et curatione Pestis ... (in Latin). Marpurgi: Chemlin. OCLC 634763100.
- Medico-chemical works
  - Joh. Beyer, Frankfurt 1647 (digital copy)
  - Berthelin, Rouen 1650 (digital copy)
  - Hermann a Sande, Frankfurt 1682 (digital copy)
