= Johann II of Saxe-Weimar =

Duke in Holy Roman Empire (1570-1605)

Johann II
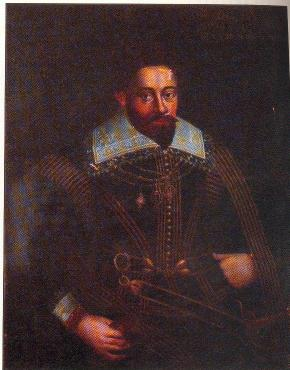

Duke of Saxe-Weimar and Jena
- Reign: 7 July 1602 – 18 July 1605
- Predecessor: Frederick Wilhelm I
- Successor: John Ernest I in Saxe-Weimar; Albert IV in Saxe-Eisenach; Ernest I in Saxe-Gotha

Ruler of Saxe-Altenburg
- Predecessor: Frederick Wilhelm I
- Successor: John Philip; Frederick; John William; Frederick William II; jointly from 1603 as Dukes of Saxe-Altenburg
- Born: 22 May 1570; Weimar, Electorate of Saxony, Holy Roman Empire
- Died: 18 July 1605 (aged 35); Weimar, Saxe-Weimar, Holy Roman Empire
- Spouse: Dorothea Maria of Anhalt (m. 1593)
- Issue among others...: John Ernest I, Duke of Saxe-Weimar; Prince Frederick; William, Duke of Saxe-Weimar; Albert IV, Duke of Saxe-Eisenach; John Frederick, Duke of Saxe-Weimar; Ernest I, Duke of Saxe-Gotha; Prince Bernard
Names
- Johann Maria Wilhelm
- House: Wettin (Ernestine line)
- Father: Johann Wilhelm, Duke of Saxe-Weimar
- Mother: Dorothea Susanne of Simmern

Johann II, Duke of Saxe-Weimar (German: Johann Maria Wilhelm; 22 May 1570 – 18 July 1605) was a Duke of Saxe-Weimar and Jena.

== Biography ==
Johann was the second son of Johann Wilhelm, Duke of Saxe-Weimar and Dorothea Susanne of Simmern.

Johann Wilhelm died in 1573 when his son was only three years old. Since at the time Johann's older brother Frederick William I was also under age, the duchy of Saxe-Weimar (originally awarded to Johann) was governed by a regency. In 1586 Frederick William reached adulthood and took full control of the duchy, including Weimar. However, he died in 1602 and the full duchy was inherited by Johann, because Frederick William's sons were underage.

Johann was more interested in natural sciences and art than politics, and therefore only against his will took over the regency of the duchy on behalf of his nephews. But when they demanded their own inheritance in 1603, he resisted their demands. Finally, Johann and his nephews made a treaty dividing the duchy: Altenburg was taken by the sons of Frederick William I, and Weimar-Jena was retained by Johann.

This line of Saxe-Altenburg became extinct in 1672, and all the inheritance passed to the line of Saxe-Weimar, Johann's descendants.

== Family ==
In Altenburg on 7 January 1593, Johann married Dorothea Maria of Anhalt. They had:

- John Ernest I, Duke of Saxe-Weimar (b. Altenburg, 21 February 1594 – d. Sankt Martin, Hungary, 6 December 1626).
- Christian William (b. and d. Altenburg, 6 April 1595) died at birth.
- Frederick (b. Altenburg, 1 March 1596 – killed in battle, Fleurus, Belgium, 29 August 1622).
- John (b. Weimar, 31 March 1597 – d. Weimar, 6 October 1604), died in childhood.
- William, Duke of Saxe-Weimar (b. Altenburg, 11 April 1598 – d. Weimar, 17 May 1662)
- Stillborn son (Altenburg, 11 April 1598), twin of William.
- Albert IV, Duke of Saxe-Eisenach (b. Altenburg, 27 July 1599 – d. Eisenach, 20 December 1644).
- John Frederick (b. Altenburg, 19 September 1600 – d. Weimar, 17 October 1628).
- Ernest I, Duke of Saxe-Gotha (b. Altenburg, 25 December 1601 – d. Schloss Friedenstein, Gotha, 26 March 1675)
- Frederick William (b. Weimar, 7 February 1603 – d. Georgenthal, 16 August 1619), died unmarried and without issue.
- Bernhard (b. Weimar, 6 August 1604 – d. Neuenburg, 18 July 1639), Count of Franken (1633).
- Johanna (b. posthumously, Weimar, 14 April 1606 – d. Weimar, 3 July 1609), died in childhood.

== Sources ==
- Hanham, Andrew (2004). "Caroline of Brandenburg-Ansbach and the 'anglicisation' of the House of Hanover". In Orr, Clarissa Campbell (ed.). Queenship in Europe 1660-1815: The Role of the Consort. pp. 276–299. ISBN 9780521814225.

Regnal titles
Preceded by Frederick William I	Duke of Saxe-Weimar; 1602–1605	Succeeded by John Ernest I of Saxe-Weimar; Albert IV of Saxe-Eisenach; Ernest I of Saxe-Gotha
Preceded by Frederick William I	Duke of Saxe-Weimar; 1602–1605	Succeeded by John Philip; Frederick; John William; Frederick William II jointly from 1603 as Dukes of Saxe-Altenburg
