= Fruitbearing Society =

German literary society founded in 1617

Fruitbearing Society Emblem and a Meeting of the Members

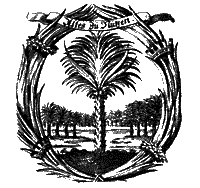
Emblem of the Fruitbearing Society

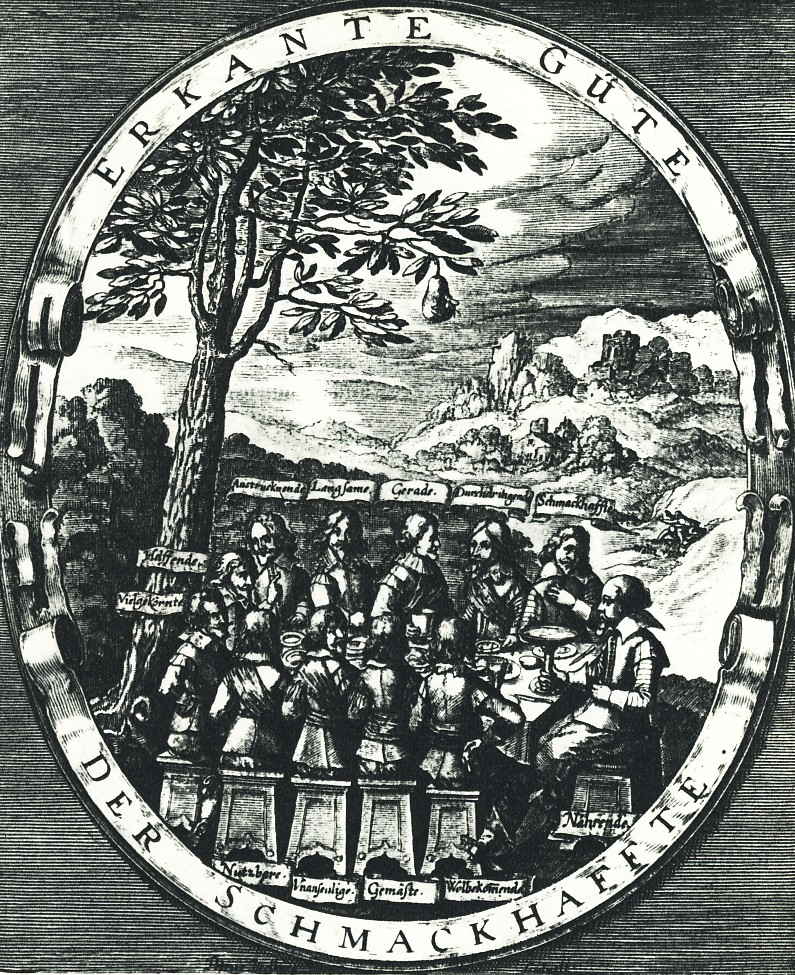
A meeting

The Fruitbearing Society (German Die Fruchtbringende Gesellschaft, lat. Societas Fructifera) was a German literary society founded in 1617 in Weimar by German scholars and nobility. Its aim was to standardize vernacular German and promote it as both a scholarly and literary language, after the pattern of the Accademia della Crusca in Florence and similar groups already thriving in Italy, followed in later years also in France (1635) and Britain.

It was also known as the Palmenorden ("Palm Order") because its emblem was the then-exotic fruitbearing date palm. Caspar von Teutleben (1576–1629), Hofmarschall at the court in Weimar, was the founding father of the society. As a young man he had travelled Italy and got inspired by the Italian language academies. During the funeral celebrations of Duchess Dorothea Maria in August 1617 which were attended by several princes he took the opportunity to propose the founding of a society following the example of the Italian Accademia della Crusca. Particularly Prince Ludwig von Anhalt-Köthen who already had joined the Accademia della Crusca in 1600 took hold of the idea and became the first president of the Palm Order.

The society counted a king (Charles X Gustav of Sweden), 153 Germanic princes, and over 60 barons, nobles, and distinguished scholars among its members. It disbanded in 1668.

The first book about the Palm Order, Der Teutsche Palmbaum, was written by Carl Gustav von Hille and published in Nuremberg in 1647.

== Members ==
The society had 890 members. Of these, the below list only includes those that have articles on the English Wikipedia. For a complete list, including their fruitbearing names, see this German article.

- Matthias Abele von und zu Lilienberg
- Johann Valentin Andreae
- Christian I of Anhalt-Bernburg
- Christian II of Anhalt-Bernburg
- Viktor Amadeus of Anhalt-Bernburg
- Georg Aribert of Anhalt-Dessau
- Johann Georg I of Anhalt-Dessau
- Johann Georg II of Anhalt-Dessau
- Johann Kasimir of Anhalt-Dessau
- Friedrich of Anhalt-Harzgerode
- Emanuel of Anhalt-Köthen
- Leberecht of Anhalt-Köthen
- Ludwig I of Anhalt-Köthen
- Ludwig der Jüngere of Anhalt-Köthen
- Wilhelm Ludwig of Anhalt-Köthen
- August of Anhalt-Plötzkau
- Johann of Anhalt-Zerbst
- Karl Wilhelm of Anhalt-Zerbst
- Rudolf of Anhalt-Zerbst
- Hans Georg von Arnim
- Frederick V, Margrave of Baden-Durlach
- Johan Banér
- Steno Bielke
- Sigmund von Birken
- Wilhelm of Birkenfeld
- Frederick William of Brandenburg
- George William of Brandenburg
- John of Brandenburg
- Christian of Brandenburg-Bayreuth
- George of Brunswick-Lüneburg
- Christian Louis of Brunswick-Lüneburg
- Anthony Ulrich of Brunswick-Lüneburg
- Augustus the Younger of Brunswick-Lüneburg
- Ferdinand Albert I of Brunswick-Lüneburg
- Friedrich Ulrich von Braunschweig und Lüneburg-Wolfenbüttel
- Rudolf von Bünau
- Rudolf von Bünau
- Johann Cothmann
- Christoph von Dohna
- Robert Douglas
- Ernst Albrecht von Eberstein
- Ernst von Freyberg
- Andreas Gryphius
- Christian Gueintz
- Friedrich Kasimir von Hanau
- Philipp Moritz von Hanau-Münzenberg
- Georg Philipp Harsdörffer
- David Elias Heidenreich
- Wilhelm Christoph von Hesse-Bingenheim und Hesse-Homburg
- Johann von Hessen-Braubach
- Ludwig VI of Hesse-Darmstadt
- Ludwig VII of Hesse-Darmstadt
- Friedrich of Hesse-Eschwege
- Friedrich II of Hesse-Homburg
- Georg Christian of Hesse-Homburg
- Moritz of Hesse-Kassel
- Wilhelm V of Hesse-Kassel
- Wilhelm VI of Hesse-Kassel
- Hermann IV of Hesse-Rotenburg
- Georg Friedrich of Hohenlohe-Neuenstein-Weikersheim
- Hans Christoff von Königsmarck
- Otto Wilhelm von Königsmarck
- Johann Kasimir Kolbe von Wartenberg
- Christoph Christian zu Altleiningen
- Johann Anton von Leiningen
- Philipp II von Leiningen Westerburg
- Friedrich von Logau
- Adolf Friedrich I of Mecklenburg-Schwerin
- Franz von Mercy
- Bernhard Meyer
- Johann Michael Moscherosch
- Johann Ludwig of Nassau-Hadamar
- Georg Neumark
- Adam Olearius
- Martin Opitz
- Axel Oxenstierna
- Christian Franz Paullini
- Ottavio Piccolomini
- Jost Andreas von Randow
- Wilhelm von Rath
- Johann Rist
- John George II of Saxony
- Johann Philipp of Saxe-Altenburg
- Adolf Wilhelm of Saxe-Eisenach
- Albrecht of Saxe-Eisenach
- Johann Georg I of Saxe-Eisenach
- Ernst I of Saxe-Gotha
- Friedrich of Saxe-Gotha
- Bernhard of Saxe-Jena
- Augustus of Saxe-Lauenburg
- Francis Erdmann of Saxe-Lauenburg
- Julius Henry of Saxe-Lauenburg
- Christian of Saxe-Merseburg
- Bernhard of Saxe-Weimar
- Friedrich of Saxe-Weimar
- Johann Ernst the Younger of Saxe-Weimar
- Johann Ernst of Saxe-Weimar
- Wilhelm IV of Saxe-Weimar
- Albrecht of Saxe-Weißenfels
- August of Saxe-Weißenfels
- August the Younger of Saxe-Weißenfels
- Heinrich of Saxe-Weißenfels
- Johann Adolph of Saxe-Weißenfels
- Moritz of Saxe-Zeitz
- Angelo Sala
- Joachim von Sandrart
- Karl Günther of Schwarzburg-Rudolstadt
- Ludwig Günther of Schwarzburg-Rudolstadt
- Anton Günther of Schwarzburg-Sondershausen
- Veit Ludwig von Seckendorf
- Torsten Stålhandske
- Wolrad IV of Waldeck-Eisenberg
- Christian of Waldeck-Wildungen
- Matthäus von Wesenbeck
- Anton von Wietersheim
- Karl Gustav Wrangel
- Julius Siegmund von Württemberg-Oels-Juliusburg
- Sylvius Friedrich von Württemberg-Oels-Juliusburg
- Philipp von Zesen
