= William, Duke of Saxe-Weimar =

Duke of Saxe-Weimar and Saxe-Jena from 1620 to 1662

Wilhelm
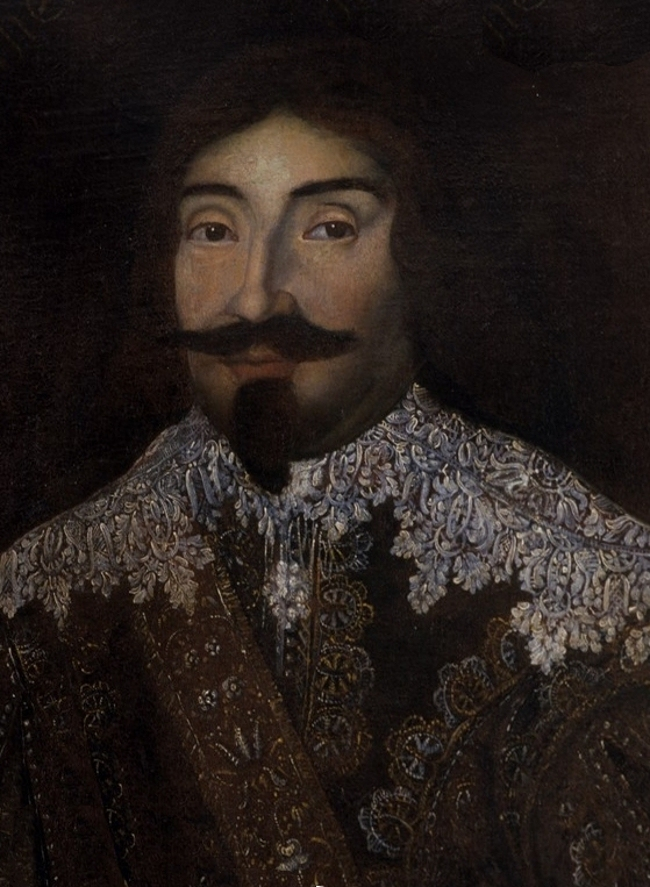

Duke of Saxe-Weimar and Duke of Saxe-Jena
- Reign: 1620–1662
- Predecessor: John Ernest I
- Successor: John Ernest II in Saxe-Weimar; Bernhard II in Saxe-Jena

Ruler of Saxe-Eisenach
- Reign: 1644–1662
- Predecessor: Albrecht
- Successor: Adolf William in Saxe-Eisenach; John George I in Saxe-Marksuhl
- Born: 11 April 1598; Altenburg
- Died: 17 May 1662 (aged 64); Weimar
- Spouse: Eleonore Dorothea of Anhalt-Dessau (m. 1625)
- Issue Detail: John Ernest II, Duke of Saxe-Weimar; Prince John William; Adolf William, Duke of Saxe-Eisenach; John George I, Duke of Saxe-Eisenach; Princess Wilhelmine Eleonore; Bernhard II, Duke of Saxe-Jena; Prince Frederick; Dorothea Maria, Duchess of Saxe-Zeitz
- House: Wettin (Ernestine line)
- Father: Johann II, Duke of Saxe-Weimar
- Mother: Dorothea Maria of Anhalt

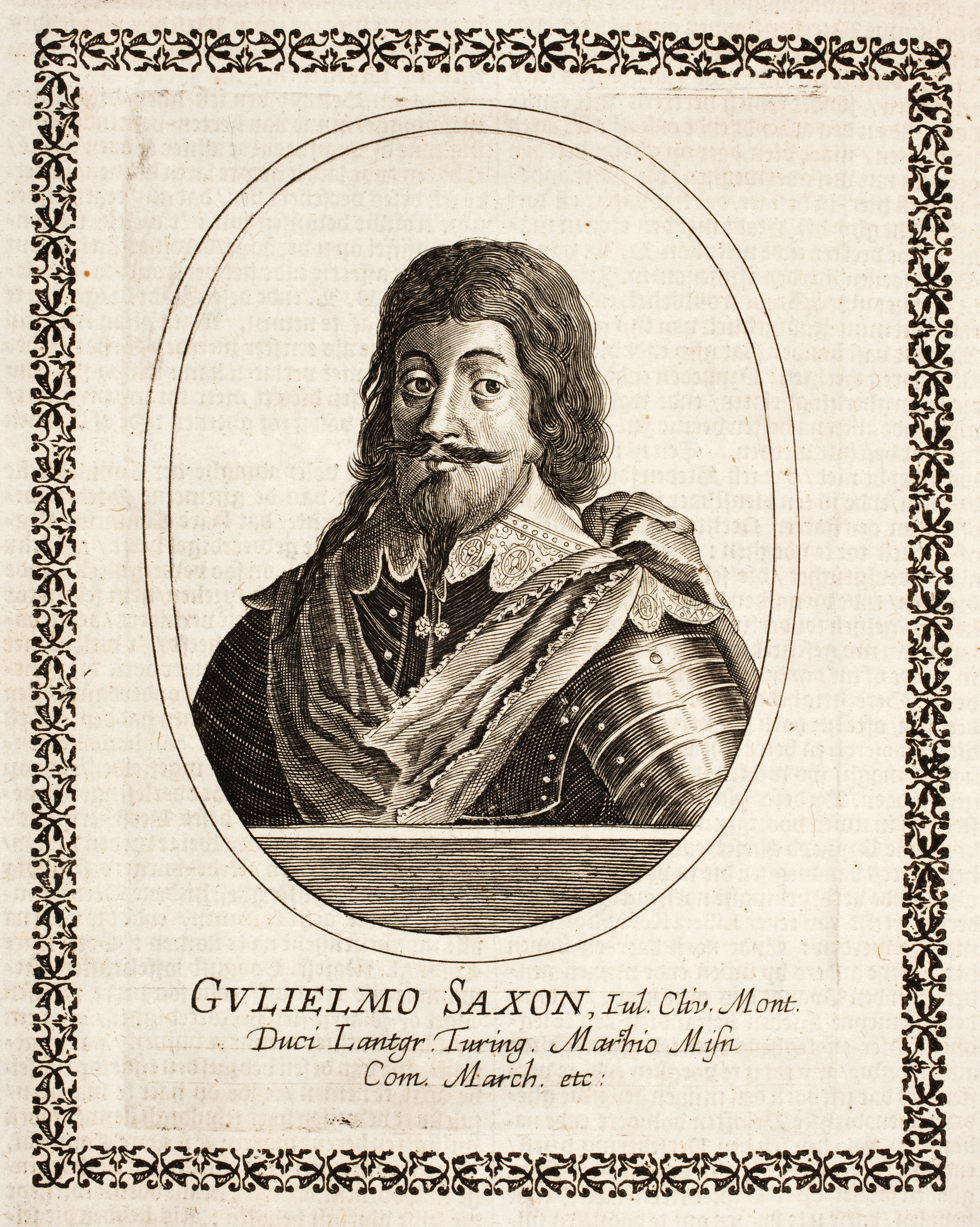
Wilhelm, Duke of Saxe-Weimar

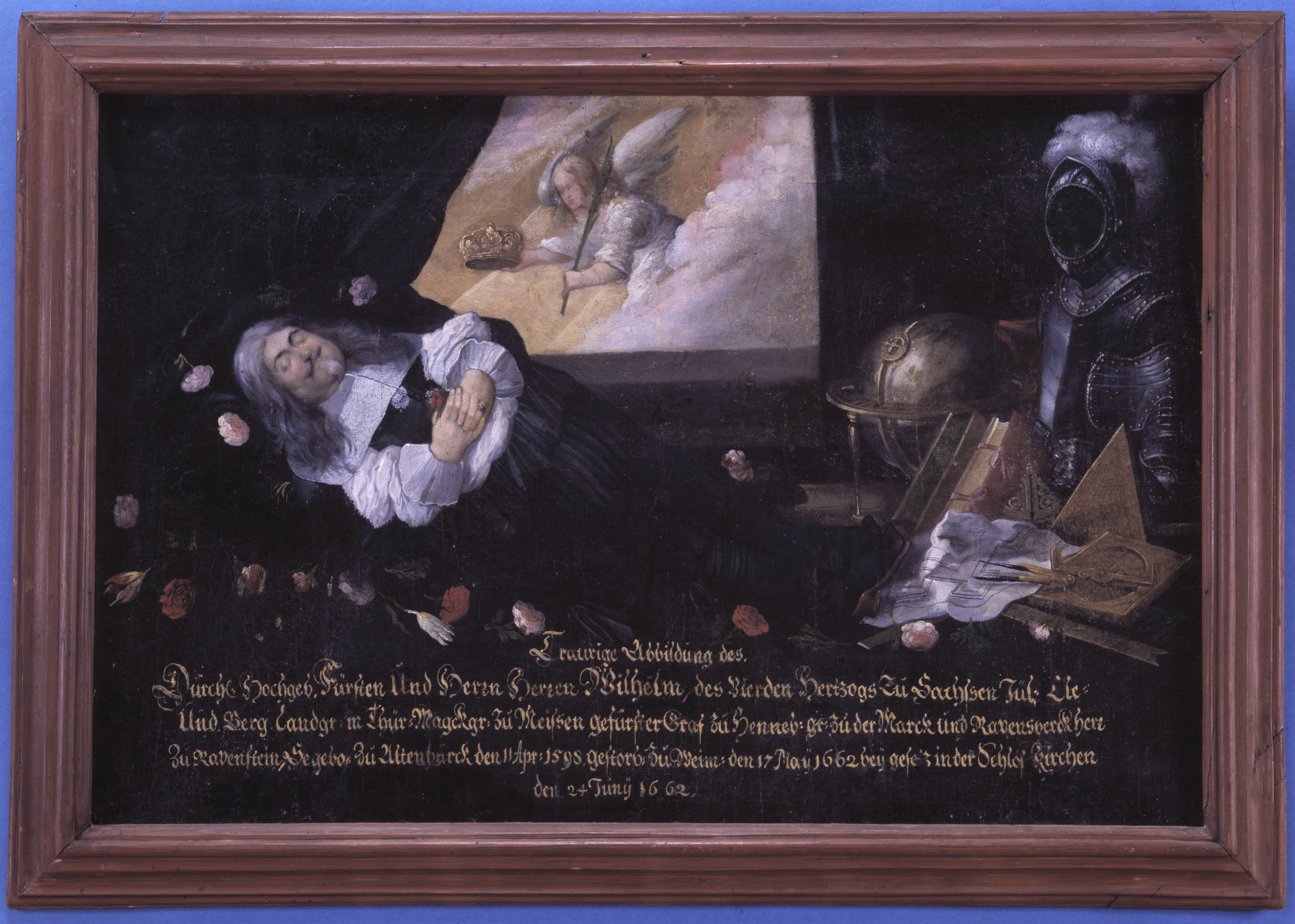
Portrait of Wilhelm, Duke of Saxe-Weimar, on lit de parade – Skoklosters slott

William, Duke of Saxe-Weimar (German: Wilhelm von Sachsen-Weimar; 11 April 1598 – 17 May 1662) was a duke of Saxe-Weimar. He was the fifth child, but the third surviving son of Johann II, Duke of Saxe-Weimar, and Dorothea Maria of Anhalt. He was the brother of Bernard of Saxe-Weimar, a prominent Protestant military leader during the Thirty Years' War, and of Ernest I, Duke of Saxe-Gotha-Altenburg, later known as "The Pious".

== Youth ==
Like his brothers John Ernest I and Frederick of Saxe-Weimar, William studied at the University of Jena. He later accompanied them on their studies abroad. Their educational tour began at the end of August 1613, during which they visited France, Great Britain and the Netherlands, before returning home in 1614.

Some years later, on 24 August 1617, during his mother's funeral, William helped found the Fruitbearing Society. In 1651 he became the second head of the society.

== Reign ==
In 1620 William became regent of all the estates of his older brother, Johann Ernst, after the latter was subject to the ban of the Empire for refusing to submit to the emperor. When Johann Ernst died in 1626, William assumed the title duke of Saxe-Weimar.

One year later, William was created a member of the Order of the Stability. During the years 1622–1623, he created a patriotic federation, the German Friedbund, for the promotion of the German states and religious liberties. William's maternal uncle, Louis I of Anhalt-Köthen, provided the friedbund with a generous endowment.

== Rise to power ==
William allied himself with his brothers in the Thirty Years' War, serving under Ernst von Mansfeld and Georg Friedrich, Margrave of Baden-Durlach. Later he was promoted under the service of Christian the Younger of Brunswick.

During the division of the paternal states in 1640, William retained Weimar and Jena, and his younger brother Albrecht received Eisenach. When Albrecht died childless in 1644, William assumed control of the entire inheritance.

King Gustavus Adolphus of Sweden was responsible for William's quick rise through the ranks of the military. After Gustav II Adolf's death, however, Count Axel Oxenstierna successfully prevented William from assuming another command as lieutenant general, and William acceded to the Peace of Prague in 1635.

When Prince Louis I of Anhalt-Köthen died on 7 January 1650, the members of the Fruitbearing Society decided that William should become his uncle's successor as head of the society. After the obligatory mourning period, William became the new head of the society on 8 May 1651, a position that he retained to the end of his life. In contrast to his predecessor, however, he was essentially limited to representative tasks.

== Marriage and children ==
In Weimar on 23 May 1625, William married Eleonore Dorothea, daughter of John George I, Prince of Anhalt-Dessau. They had:

1. William (b. Weimar, 26 March 1626 – d. Weimar, 1 November 1626).
2. John Ernest II, Duke of Saxe-Weimar (b. Weimar, 11 September 1627 – d. Weimar, 15 May 1683)
3. John William (b. Weimar, 16 August 1630 – d. Weimar, 16 May 1639).
4. Adolf Wilhelm, Duke of Saxe-Eisenach (b. Weimar, 14 May 1632 – d. Eisenach, 22 November 1668).
5. Johann Georg I, Duke of Saxe-Marksuhl, later of Saxe-Eisenach (b. Weimar, 12 July 1634 – d. in hunting accident, Eckhartshausen, 19 September 1686)
6. Wilhelmine Eleonore (b. Weimar, 7 June 1636 – d. Weimar, 1 April 1653).
7. Bernhard II, Duke of Saxe-Jena (b. Weimar, 14 October 1638 – d. Jena, 3 May 1678).
8. Frederick (b. Weimar, 19 March 1640 – d. Weimar, 19 August 1656).
9. Dorothea Marie (b. Weimar, 14 October 1641 – d. Moritzburg, 11 June 1675), married on 3 July 1656 to Maurice, Duke of Saxe-Zeitz.

== Legacy ==
William wrote the words for the hymn Herr Jesu Christ, dich zu uns wend in 1648. The hymn was sung on Sundays in Thüringen after the priest had entered the pulpit to give his sermon. With a melody that dates back to 1628, it has entered modern German hymnody. In Weimar Johann Sebastian Bach and his cousin Johann Gottfried Walther, the organists at the Schloss and the Stadtkirche, both composed several settings of the hymn, as chorale preludes and chorale variations. Among the five settings by Bach are BWV 632, from the Orgelbüchlein, and BWV 655a, which became part of the Great Eighteen Chorale Preludes.

William is portrayed positively as a figure in the fictional 1632 series, also known as the 1632-verse or Ring of Fire series, an alternate-history book series, created, primarily co-written and coordinated by historian Eric Flint.

== Bibliography ==
- Frank Boblenz: Zum Einfluß Wilhelms IV. von Sachsen-Weimar (1598–1662) auf die Entwicklung der Architektur in Thüringen. In: Residenzkultur in Thüringen vom 16. bis 19. Jahrhundert (PALMBAUM Texte: Kulturgeschichte; 8). Bucha bei Jena 1999, S. 114–137.
- Frank Boblenz: Ein Totenbildnis von Herzog Wilhelm IV. von Sachsen-Weimar (1598–1662) im schwedischen Schloss Skokloster. In: Weimar-Jena. Die große Stadt. Das kulturhistorische Archiv 5 (2012) H. 3, S. 220–227. ISSN 1869-7895
- Georg Philipp Harsdörffer: Fortpflantzung der hochlöblichen Fruchtbringenden Geselschaft: Das ist / Kurtze Erzehlung alles dessen / Was sich bey Erwehlung und Antrettung hochbesagter Geselschaft Oberhauptes / Deß ... Schmackhaften / ... zugetragen. Samt Etlichen Glückwünschungen / und Einer Lobrede deß Geschmackes. Endter, Nürnberg 1651 (Digitalizado)
- Gustav Lämmerhirt: Wilhelm (Herzog von Sachsen-Weimar). In: Allgemeine Deutsche Biographie (ADB). Band 43, Duncker & Humblot, Leipzig 1898, S. 180–195.
- Hanham, Andrew (2004). "Caroline of Brandenburg-Ansbach and the 'anglicisation' of the House of Hanover". In Orr, Clarissa Campbell (ed.). Queenship in Europe 1660-1815: The Role of the Consort. pp. 276–299. ISBN 9780521814225.
- Williams, Peter (2003), The Organ Music of J. S. Bach (2nd ed.), Cambridge University Press, pp. 296–297, ISBN 0-521-89115-9

William, Duke of Saxe-Weimar House of Wettin Born: 11 April 1598 Died: 17 May 1662
Regnal titles
Preceded by Johann Ernst I	Duke of Saxe-Weimar; 1620–1662	Succeeded by Johann Ernst II of Saxe-Weimar; Bernhard II of Saxe-Jena
Preceded by Albrecht	Duke of Saxe-Eisenach; 1644–1662	Succeeded by Adolf Wilhelm of Saxe-Eisenach; Johann Georg I of Saxe-Marksuhl
Preceded by Louis I, Prince of Anhalt-Köthen	Head of the Fruitbearing Society; 1651–1662	Succeeded by August, Duke of Saxe-Weissenfels
