= Albert IV of Saxe-Eisenach =

Albert IV
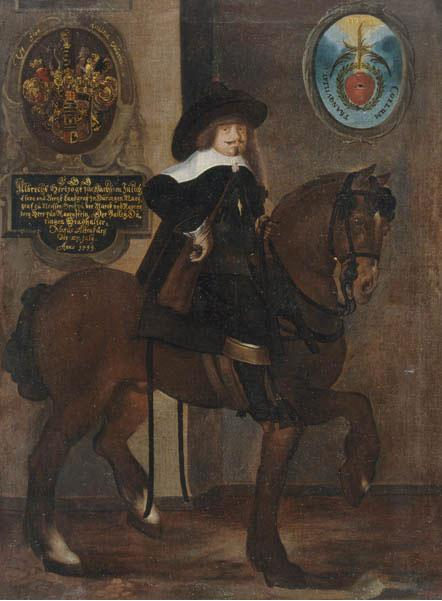
- Portrait, 1666

Duke of Saxe-Eisenach
- Reign: 1640–1644
- Predecessor: New creation
- Successor: Wilhelm of Saxe-Weimar
- Born: 27 July 1599; Altenburg
- Died: 20 December 1644 (aged 45); Eisenach
- Spouse: Dorothea of Saxe-Altenburg
- House: House of Wettin
- Father: Johann, Duke of Saxe-Weimar
- Mother: Dorothea Maria of Anhalt
- Religion: Lutheran

Albrecht, Duke of Saxe-Eisenach, (Altenburg, 27 July 1599 – Eisenach, 20 December 1644) was a ruler of the duchy of Saxe-Eisenach. He was the seventh (fourth surviving) son of Johann, Duke of Saxe-Weimar, and Dorothea Maria of Anhalt. His regnal name Albert IV derives from the numbering of the duchy of Saxony as a whole, not specifically to the succession in Saxe-Eisenach.

Albrecht received his first instruction from the Field Marshal Frederick of Kospoth. Later he studied at the University of Jena with his brothers.

From 1619 to 1621 he completed his Cavalierstour (Study Tour) with his younger brother Johann Frederick. The two princes travelled to France and Switzerland.

After his return in 1621, Albrecht occupied himself with administrative duties until 1626. He also represented his absent brothers as regent.

In Weimar on 24 June 1633 Albrecht married his first cousin Dorothea of Saxe-Altenburg, daughter of Frederick William I, Duke of Saxe-Weimar. The marriage was childless.

In accordance with a divisionary treaty concluded with his brothers, Albrecht received Eisenach in 1640. He died four years later, after which his state was merged with Saxe-Weimar under Wilhelm of Saxe-Weimar.

Preceded by New Creation	Duke of Saxe-Eisenach; 1640–1644	Succeeded by Wilhelm of Saxe-Weimar
