= John Ernest I of Saxe-Weimar =

Noble in Holy Roman Empire (1594- 1626)

John Ernest I
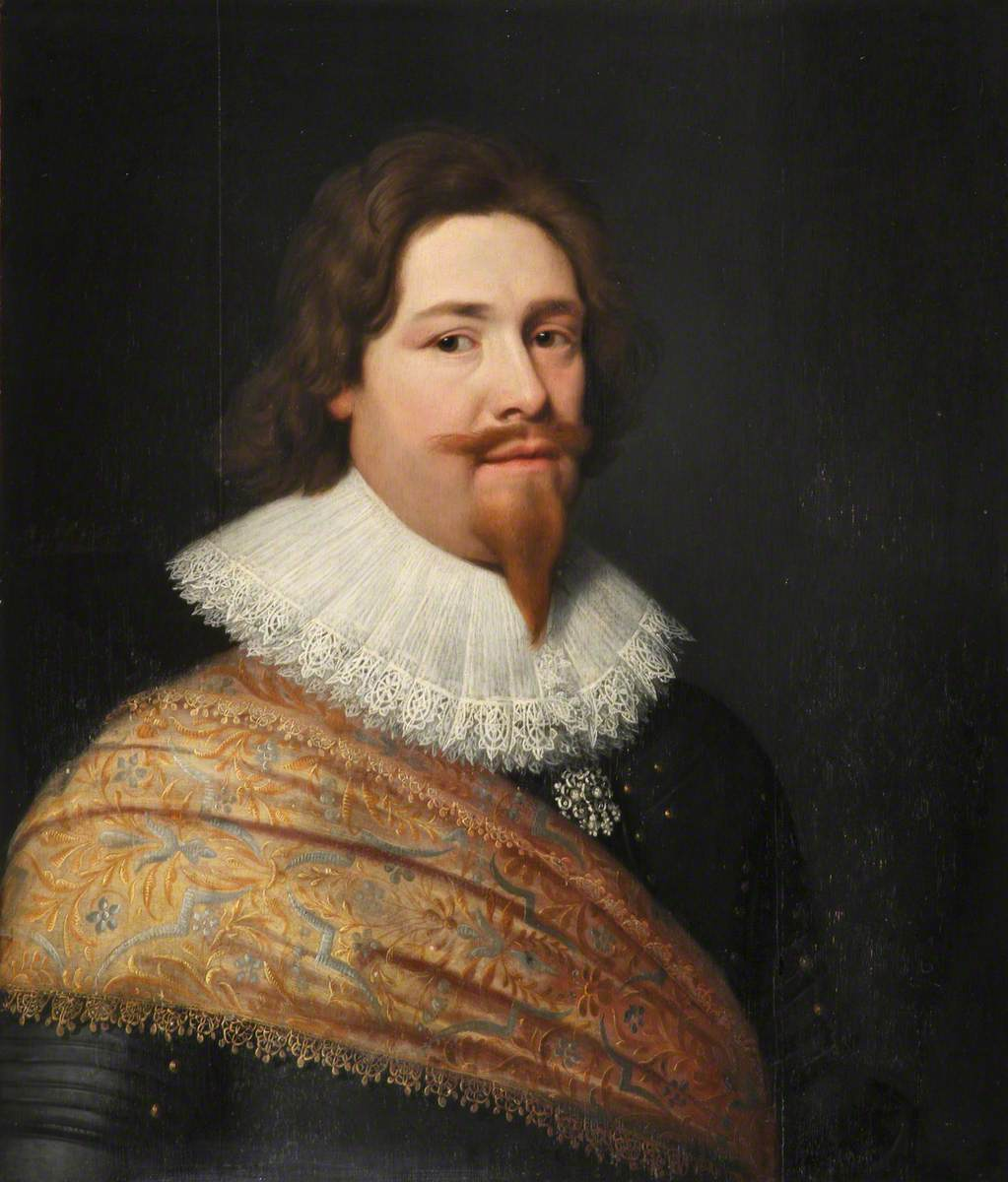
- Portrait by Michiel Jansz. van Mierevelt

Duke of Saxe-Weimar
- Reign: 1605–1620
- Predecessor: Johann
- Successor: Wilhelm
- Born: 21 February 1594; Altenburg
- Died: 6 December 1626 (aged 32); Sankt Martin, Hungary
- House: Wettin (Ernestine line)
- Father: Johann, Duke of Saxe-Weimar
- Mother: Dorothea Maria of Anhalt
- Religion: Lutheran

Johann Ernst I, Duke of Saxe-Weimar (21 February 1594 in Altenburg – 6 December 1626 in Sankt Martin, Hungary), was a duke of Saxe-Weimar.

== Biography ==
Born as the eldest son of Johann, Duke of Saxe-Weimar and Dorothea Maria of Anhalt, during his first years, Johann Ernst had a tutor and arms master, Matt of Johan. His father died on 18 July 1605, leaving the duchy under the governance of a regent. In 1608 he began his studies at the age of 14 at the University of Jena accompanied by his younger brothers, Wilhelm and Frederick. While at the university, his guardian appointed a companion and supervisor over the three princes, who later became Field Marshal Kaspar of Teutleben and the Preceptor Frederick Hortleder. In 1613–1614, Johann and his brothers, with his guardians, took a tour of France, Great Britain and the Netherlands as part of their studies.

In 1615 Johann Ernst reached adulthood and took control of his duchy and the guardianship of his under-age younger brothers.

On 24 August 1617 in the Schloss Hornstein (now Wilhelmsburg Castle), during his mother's funeral, Johann Ernst created The Fruitbearing Society (Fruchtbringende Gesellschaft), a German literary society. The young duke participated as an initial member.

During his government, Johann Ernst promoted the reforms of Wolfgang Ratke in Köthen. He also supported the similar school reforms of Johannes Kromayer and Johann Weidner in Weimar, starting on 1618 in Jena and Weimar with the annulment of tax decrees.

In 1620 Johann Ernst served under Frederick V, Elector Palatine, the famous Winter King. After his defeat in the Battle of White Mountain on 8 November 1620, the duke refused to submit to the Emperor without conditions. As a punishment, he lost his estates and the guardianship of his brothers.

Now fully against the Habsburgs, he fought in the Netherlands and performed duties as a ride master. Later, he took a commission as a Danish lieutenant general of the cavalry and fought in the Thirty Years' War in Westphalia and Lower Saxony. As such he participated in the conquest of the Schlesiens. Afterwards he went to fight for Count Ernst von Mansfeld for one of his estates in Hungary. There Johann Ernst died, at the age of 32 years, in the Hungarian location of Sankt Martin, as a result of war wounds.

Regnal titles
Preceded by Johann	Duke of Saxe-Weimar; 1605–1620	Succeeded by Wilhelm
