= Bernard of Saxe-Weimar =

German general of 30 Years War, serving Sweden and France

Bernard
- Born: 16 August 1604; Weimar, Duchy of Saxe-Weimar
- Died: 18 July 1639 (aged 34); Neuenburg am Rhein
- Burial: Breisach, later Weimar
- House: Wettin (Ernestine line)
- Father: John II, Duke of Saxe-Weimar
- Mother: Dorothea Maria of Anhalt
- Military career
- Conflicts: Thirty Years' War; • Battle of Nördlingen; • Bernard's Upper Rhine Campaign; • Battle of Rheinfelden; • Battle of Wittenweiher

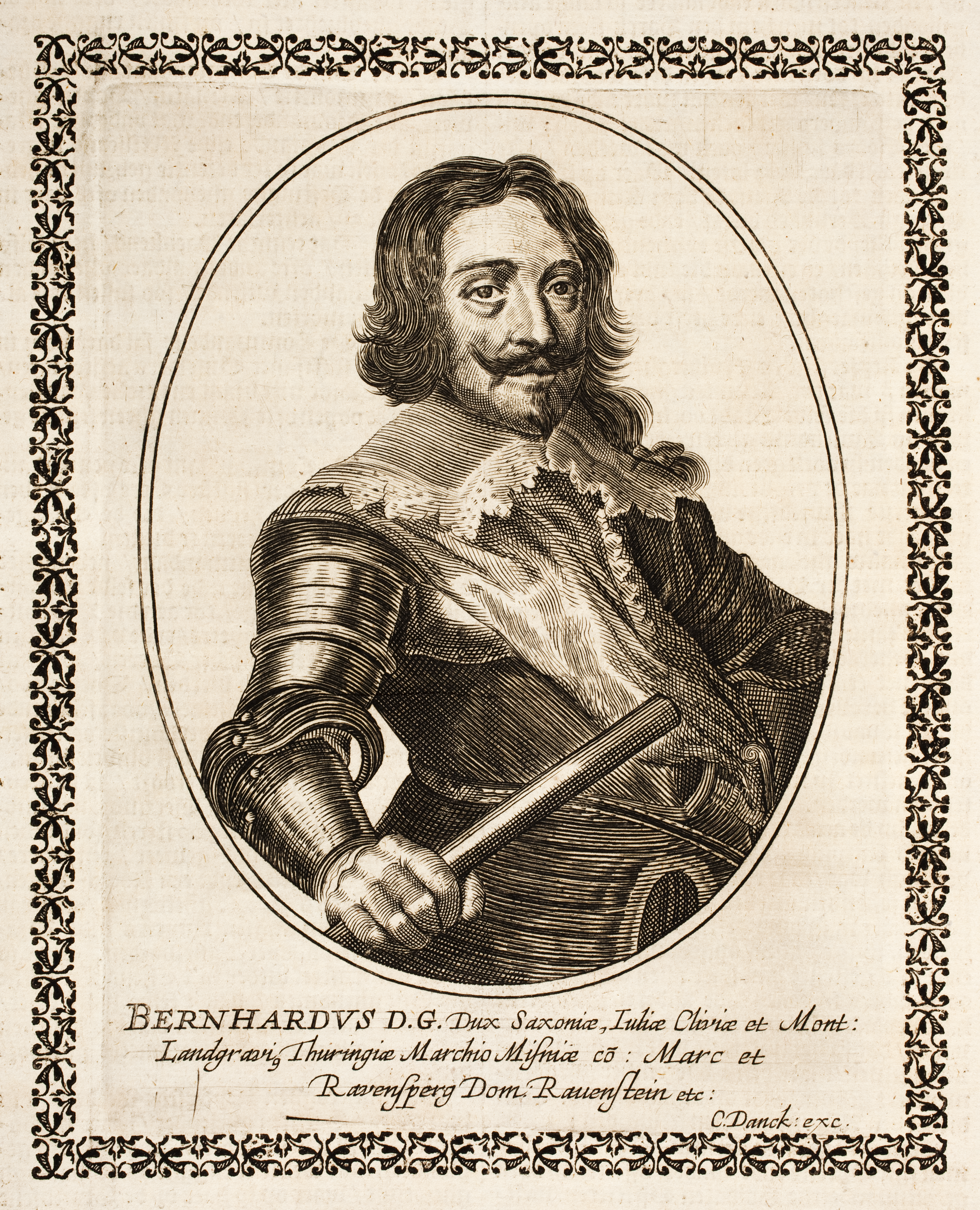
Bernard of Saxe-Weimar

Bernard of Saxe-Weimar (German: Bernhard von Sachsen-Weimar; 16 August 1604 – 18 July 1639) was a duke of Saxe-Weimar and a politically active Protestant general during the Thirty Years' War (1618–48). Known as one of the most capable field commanders of his age, he secured several notable victories against the forces of the Austrian Habsburgs, which strengthened both his reputation and the strategic position of the Protestant armies.

Having first served in the armies of the Rhenish Palatinate, Baden, and Denmark, Bernard joined the Swedish king Gustavus II Adolphus in 1631 and rose from colonel of the royal guards to general. After Gustavus was killed at the Battle of Lützen (1632), Bernard took command and helped secure a Protestant victory, earning the duchy of Franconia for his later successes against Wallenstein. Following a crushing defeat at Nördlingen (1634) and the loss of his territories, he entered French service in 1635 in return for lands in Alsace, and his capture of Rheinfelden, Freiburg, and Breisach (1638) broke the Habsburg–Spanish grip on France. He died suddenly in 1639, and Cardinal Richelieu absorbed his army and territories into the French crown.

== Biography ==
Born in Weimar in the Duchy of Saxe-Weimar, Bernard was the eleventh son of Johann, Duke of Saxe-Weimar, and Dorothea Maria of Anhalt.

Bernard received an unusually good education and studied briefly at the University of Jena, but soon went to the court of Duke John Casimir of Saxe-Coburg to engage in knightly exercises. At the outbreak of the Thirty Years' War he took the field on the Protestant side, and served under Mansfeld at Wiesloch (1622), under the Margrave of Baden at Wimpfen (1622), and with his brother William at Stadtlohn (1623). Undismayed by these defeats, he took part in the campaigns of King Christian IV of Denmark. After a severe defeat in Holstein in 1627, Bernhard left Danish service and went to the Dutch Republic. There he was present at the famous Siege of 's-Hertogenbosch in 1629.

When King Gustavus Adolphus of Sweden landed in Germany Bernard quickly joined him, and for a short time he was colonel of the Swedish life horse guard. After the Battle of Breitenfeld (1631), he accompanied Gustavus in his march to the Rhine and, between this event and the Battle of the Alte Veste, Bernard commanded numerous expeditions in almost every district from the Moselle to Tyrol. At the Alte Veste he displayed great courage, and at the Battle of Lützen (1632), when Gustavus was killed, Bernard assumed the command, killed a colonel who refused to lead his men to the charge, and finally by his furious energy won the victory at sundown.

At first as a subordinate to his brother William, who as a Swedish lieutenant-general succeeded to the command, but later as an independent commander, Bernard continued to push his forays over southern Germany; and with the Swedish General Gustav Horn he made in 1633 a successful invasion into Bavaria, which was defended by the imperialist general Count Aldringer. In this year he was granted the former Bishoprics of Würzburg and Bamberg, being granted the title of Duke of Franconia. He installed one of his many brothers as Statthalter, and returned to the wars. A stern Protestant, he exacted heavy contributions from the Catholic cities which he took, and his repeated victories caused him to be regarded by German Protestants as the saviour of their religion. But in 1634 Bernard suffered a great defeat at Nördlingen, losing the best of the Swedish army.

In 1635 Bernard entered the service of France, which had by then intervened in the war. He held a difficult dual position; in the following campaigns, ably and resolutely conducted as they were, Bernard sometimes pursued a purely French policy, whilst at other times he used French mercenaries to forward his own cause. From a military point of view his most notable achievements were on the common ground of the upper Rhine, in the Breisgau.

In his great campaign of 1638, Bernard won the battles of Rheinfelden, Wittenweiher, and Thann, and captured successively Rheinfelden, Freiburg, and Breisach, the last reputed one of the strongest fortresses in Europe. Bernard had in the first instance received definite assurances from France that he should be given Alsace and Haguenau, Würzburg having been lost in the debacle of 1634; he now hoped to make Breisach the capital of his new duchy.

Bernard's health, however, was deteriorating. He died at Neuenburg am Rhein at the beginning of the campaign. The governor of Breisach Johann Ludwig von Erlach was bribed to transfer the fortress to France. Bernard was temporarily buried at Breisach, his remains were not carried to Weimar until 16 years later.
