= John II, Count Palatine of Simmern =

Count Palatine Of Simmern

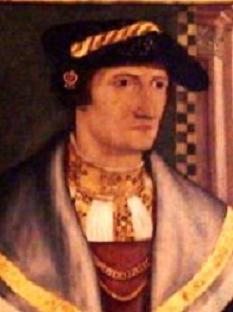
- John II, Count Palatine of Simmern
- Born: 21 March 1492; Simmern
- Died: 18 May 1557 (aged 65); Simmern
- Noble family: House of Palatinate-Simmern (House of Wittelsbach)
- Spouses: Beatrix of Baden (m. 1508; died 1535) Maria Jakoba of Oettingen-Oettingen (m. 1554)
- Issue Detail: Katherine, Abbess of Kumbd; Joanna, Abbess of Marienberg; Ottilie of Palatine Simmern; Frederick III, Elector Palatine; Brigitte, Abbess of Neuburg; Georg, Count Palatine of Simmern-Sponheim; Elizabeth of Palatinate-Simmern; Reichard, Count Palatine of Simmern-Sponheim; Maria of Palatine Simmern; Sabina, Countess of Egmont; Helena, Countess of Hanau-Münzenberg
- Father: John I, Count Palatine of Simmern
- Mother: Johanna of Nassau-Saarbrücken

John II (21 March 1492 – 18 May 1557) was the Count Palatine of Simmern from 1509 until 1557.

== Early life and ancestry ==
John II was born in Simmern in 1492, into the House of Wittelsbach, as the eldest surviving son of John I, Count Palatine of Simmern and his wife, Countess Joanna of Nassau-Saarbrücken (1464 - 1521) the daughter of Johann II of Nassau-Saarbrücken.

== Reign ==
In 1508 he married Beatrix of Baden, daughter of Margrave Christoph I, as his first wife. He succeeded his father in 1509. John II allowed printing to be established in Simmern and was a patron of sculpture. He introduced the Reformation into Simmern which led to increased tensions with his neighbours, the Archbishoprics of Trier and Mainz.

== Children ==
With Beatrix of Baden:

1. Katherine (27 March 1510 – 22 March 1572) Abbess in the Kumbd monastery
2. Joanna (1 July 1512 – 2 February 1581) Abbess in the Marienberg monastery near Boppard
3. Ottilie (4 November 1513 – 6 September 1553) Nun in Marienberg near Boppard
4. Frederick III (14 February 1515 – 26 October 1576)
5. Brigitte (18 August 1516 – 13 April 1562) Abbess of Neuburg monastery
6. Georg (20 February 1518 – 17 May 1569)
7. Elizabeth (13 February 1520 – 18 February 1564)
8. Reichard (25 July 1521 – 13 January 1598)
9. Maria (29 April 1524 – 29 May 1576)
10. William (24 July 1526 – 9 March 1527)
11. Sabina (13 June 1528 – 19 June 1578): married to Lamoral, Count of Egmont
12. Helena (13 June 1532 – 5 February 1579)

After the death of his first wife, John married (after 19 years of widowhood) the thirty-one-year-old Countess Maria Jakobine of Oettingen (1525–1575), the daughter of Louis XV, Count of Oettingen (1486-1557). This marriage remained childless. After the death of her husband, his widow married Count Johann of Schwarzenberg-Hohenlandsberg (1525-1588).

== Death ==
John II, Count Palatine of Simmern died on 18 May 1557 in Simmern, aged 65. He was interred, alongside both of his wives, in the Wittelsbach family vault of Saint Stephen´s Church, Simmern, Rhineland-Palatinate, Germany.

== Ancestry ==
Ancestors of John II, Count Palatine of Simmern

8. Stephen, Count Palatine of Simmern-Zweibrücken
4. Frederick I, Count Palatine of Simmern
9. Anna of Veldenz
2. John I, Count Palatine of Simmern
10. Arnold, Duke of Guelders
5. Margaret of Guelders
11. Catherine of Cleves
1. John II, Count Palatine of Simmern
12. Philip I, Count of Nassau-Weilburg
6. John II of Nassau-Saarbrücken
13. Elisabeth of Lorraine-Vaudémont
3. Joanna of Nassau-Saarbrücken (1464-1521)
14. John IV of Loon-Heinsberg
7. Johanna of Loon-Heinsberg
15. Johanna of Diest

John II, Count Palatine of Simmern House of Wittelsbach Born: 21 March 1492 Died: 18 May 1557
German nobility
| Preceded by John I | Count Palatine of Simmern; 1509–1557 | Succeeded by Frederick II |
