= New Bolanden Castle =

- Burg Neu-Bolanden; Neubolanden
- Bolanden
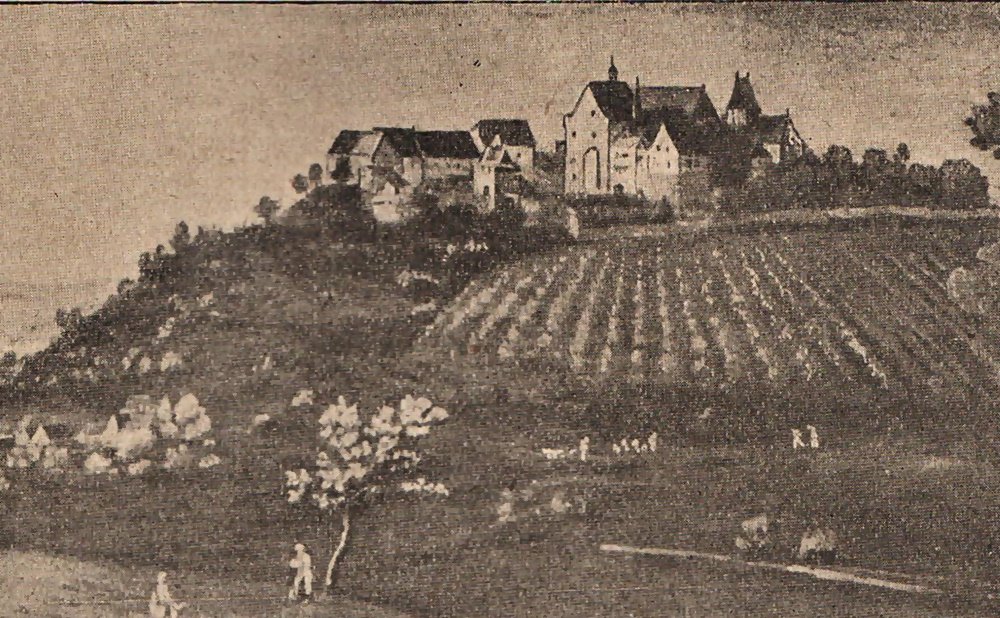
- Neubolanden Castle in 1613

Site information
- Type: hill castle, spur castle
- Code: DE-RP
- Condition: Mauerreste

Location
- Coordinates: 49°38′21″N 8°00′50″E
- Height: 260 m above sea level (NHN)

Site history
- Built: 1200 to 1300

Garrison information
- Occupants: counts

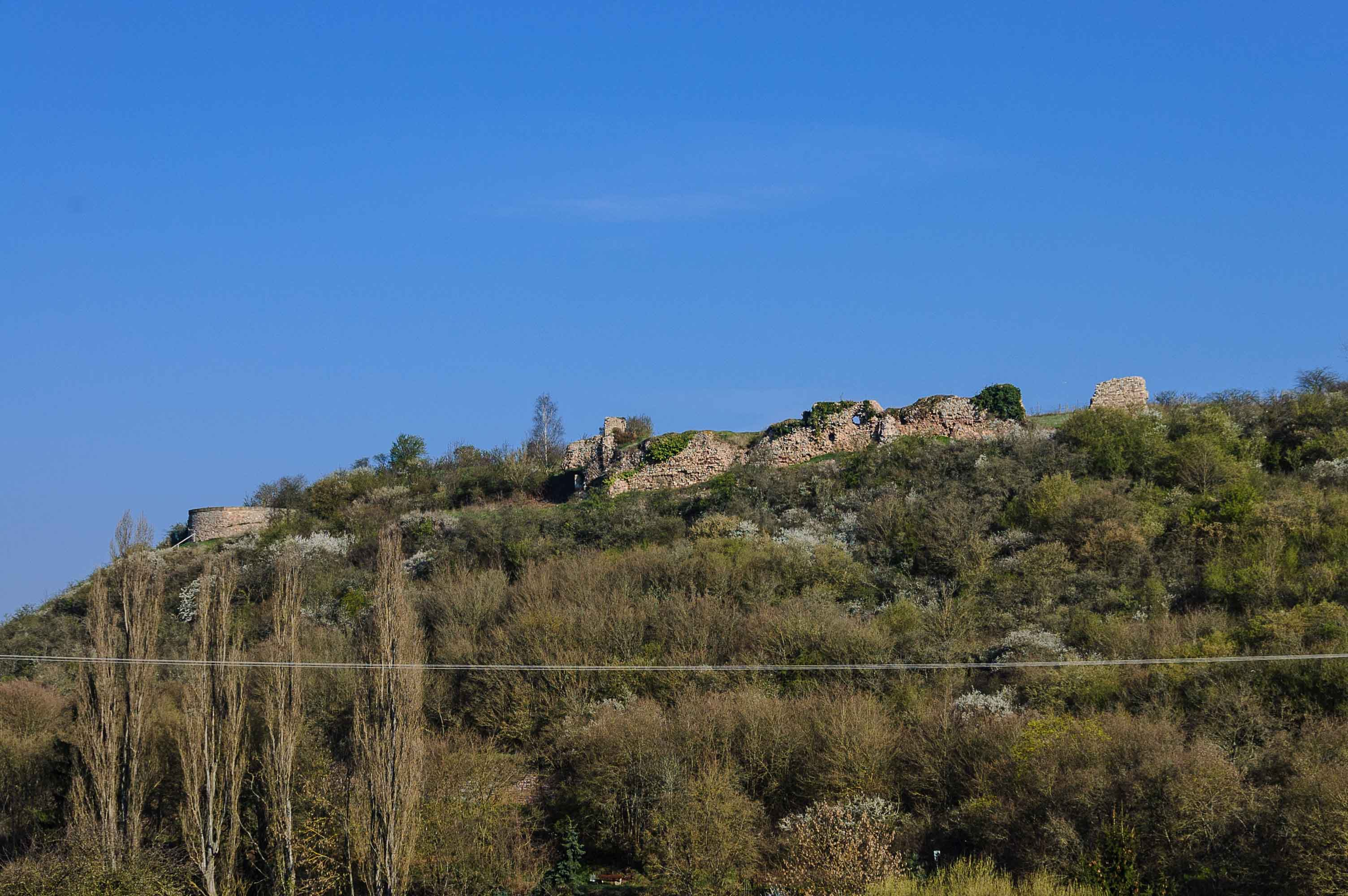
Ruins of New Bolanden

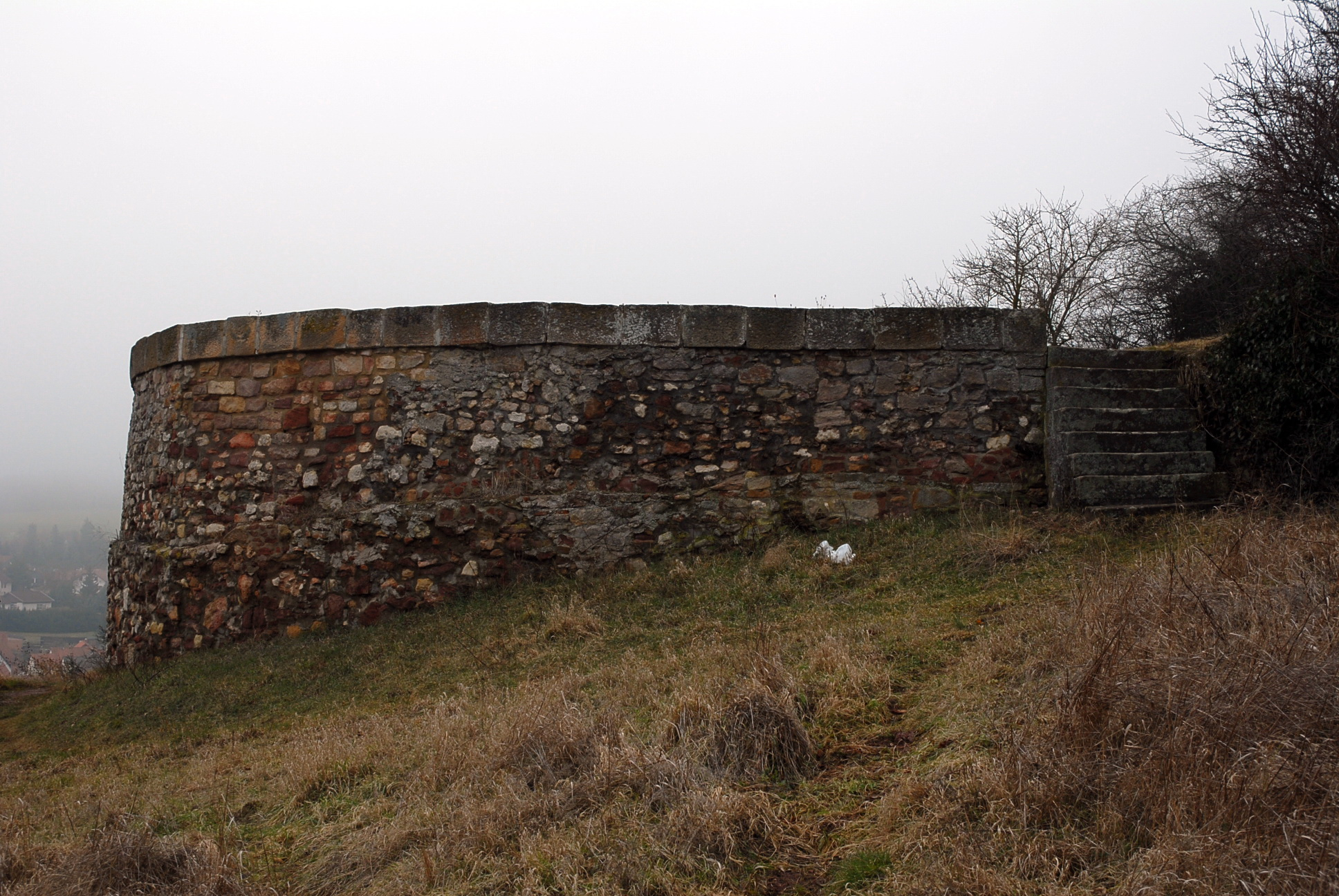
Remains of a tower; today modified into a viewing platform

New Bolanden Castle (German: Burg Neu-Bolanden or Neubolanden) is a ruined spur castle and, today, a cultural monument. It stands at a height of 260 m on the 276-metre-high Schlossberg hill immediately east of the village of Bolanden in the county of Donnersbergkreis in the German state of Rhineland-Palatinate.

== History ==
The castle was built in the 13th century by the imperial ministeriales of the House of Bolanden and is first recorded from 1258 to 1262. In the 14th century, as a result of the castle being partitioned, there were disputes over its divisions. In the mid-14th century, New Bolanden was transferred to Electoral Palatinate as a fief. Later, it entered the possession of the counts of Nassau-Weilburg and was expanded in the early 15th century. From 1475 to 1598, New Bolanden Castle belonged to the Electoral Palatine secundogeniture of Palatinate-Simmern before returning the Electorate. It was the residence of three dowager duchesses of the House of Palatinate-Simmern as a retirement retreat: from 1480 to 1486 of Margaret, daughter of Arnold of Egmond, Duke of Geldern, and widow of Duke Frederick I; from 1515 to 1521 of Johanna, daughter of Count John III of Saarbrücken and widow of Duke John I; from 1598 to 1621 of Anne Margareta, daughter of Count Palatine George John I of Palatinate-Veldenz and widow of Duke Reichard. The author of medical works who later became the city doctor of Frankfurt, Arnold Weickard, resided at New Bolanden as the personal doctor of Anne Margareta. During the Peasants' War in 1525 the castle was plundered and eventually razed. The ruins were rebuilt into a residential schloss and acted as a district office and dowager's seat. After being occupied by the Spanish (1620–1625) during the Thirty Years' War the castle was destroyed in 1689 by the French during the War of the Palatine Succession and, around 1822, demolished to its presently surviving state.

== Site ==
Of the rectangular castle on a hill spur, only a few wall remains have survived. Large areas of the castle were demolished during the 19th century. A picture from the 17th century gives an impression of the castle. The remains of the neck ditch are still visible.

== Literature ==
- Jürgen Keddigkeit: Neu-Bolanden. In: Jürgen Keddigkeit, Ulrich Burkhart, Rolf Übel (eds.): Pfälzisches Burgenlexikon. Band 3. Kaiserslautern, 2005, ISBN 3-927754-51-X, pp. 674–683.
- Gerald F. W. Müller: Secessit clarissimi viri ... primogenitus - Fragment einer Grabinschrift in der Klosterkirche Hane. In: Donnersberg-Jahrbuch 2015 - Jahrbuch für das Land um den Donnersberg Jahrgang 38. Kirchheimbolanden, 2014, ISBN 978-3-926306-71-5, pp. 86–89
