= Frederick III, Elector Palatine =

Elector Palatine from 1559 to 1576

Frederick III
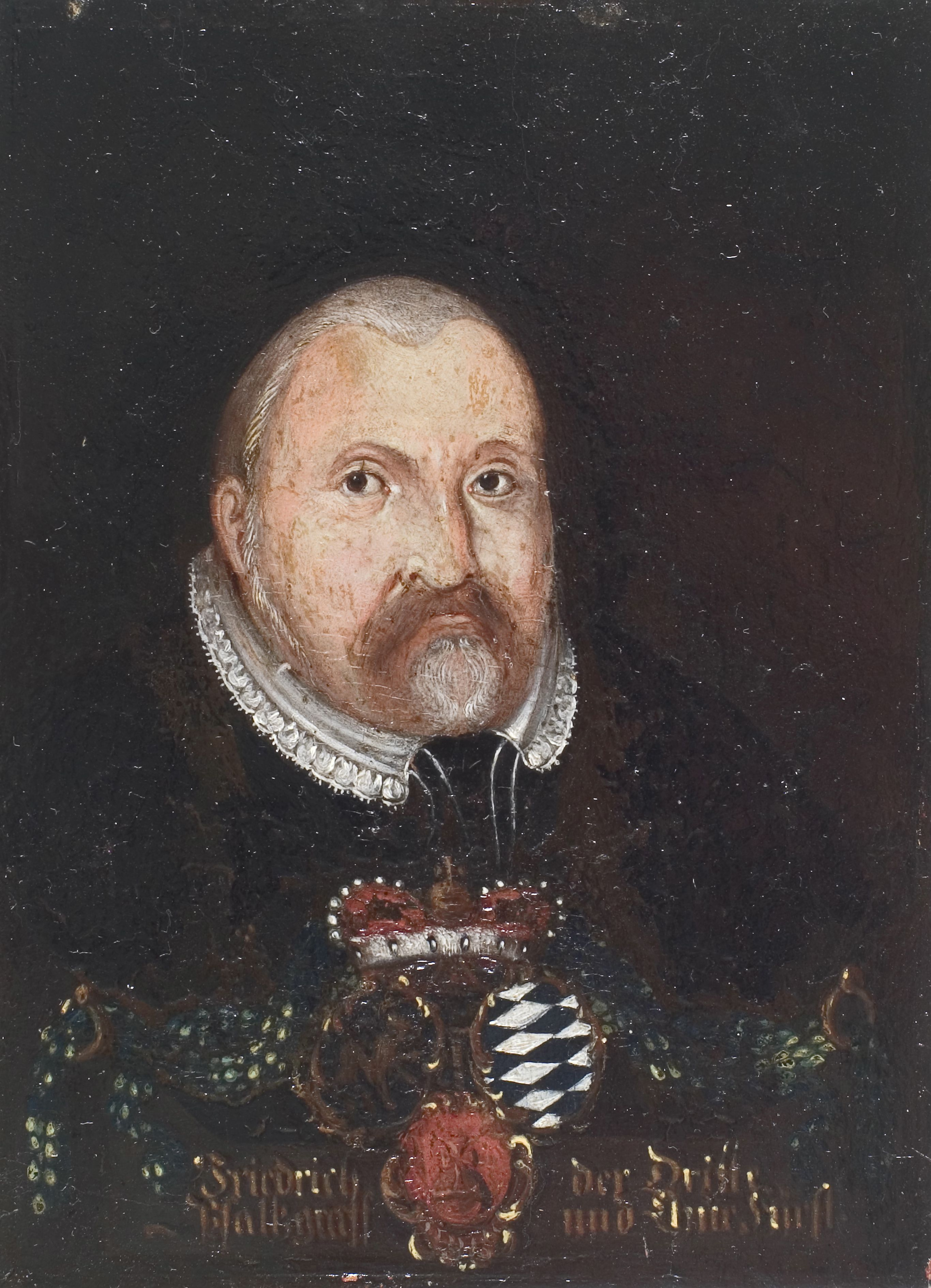

Elector Palatine
- Reign: 12 February 1559 – 26 October 1576
- Predecessor: Otto Henry
- Successor: Louis VI
- Born: 14 February 1515; Simmern
- Died: 26 October 1576 (aged 61); Heidelberg
- Burial: Heiliggeistkirche, Heidelberg
- Spouse: Marie of Brandenburg-Kulmbach (m. 1537; died 1567) Amalia of Neuenahr (m. 1569)
- Issue Detail: Alberta of Palatinate; Louis VI, Elector Palatine; Elizabeth, Duchess of Saxony; Hermann Louis of Palatinate; John Casimir, Count of Palatinate-Simmern; Dorothea Susanne, Duchess of Saxe-Weimar; Christof of Palatinate; Kunigunde, Countess of Nassau-Dillenburg
- House: Wittelsbach
- Father: John II of Simmern
- Mother: Beatrice of Baden
- Religion: Calvinist

Frederick III of Simmern, the Pious, Elector Palatine of the Rhine (14 February 1515 – 26 October 1576) was a ruler from the House of Wittelsbach, specifically the cadet branch of Palatinate-Simmern-Sponheim. He was a son of John II of Simmern and inherited the Palatinate from the childless Elector Palatine Otto Henry (Ottheinrich) in 1559. He was a devout convert to Calvinism and made the Reformed confession the official religion of his domain by overseeing the composition and promulgation of the Heidelberg Catechism. His support of Calvinism gave the German Reformed movement a foothold within the Holy Roman Empire.

== Life ==
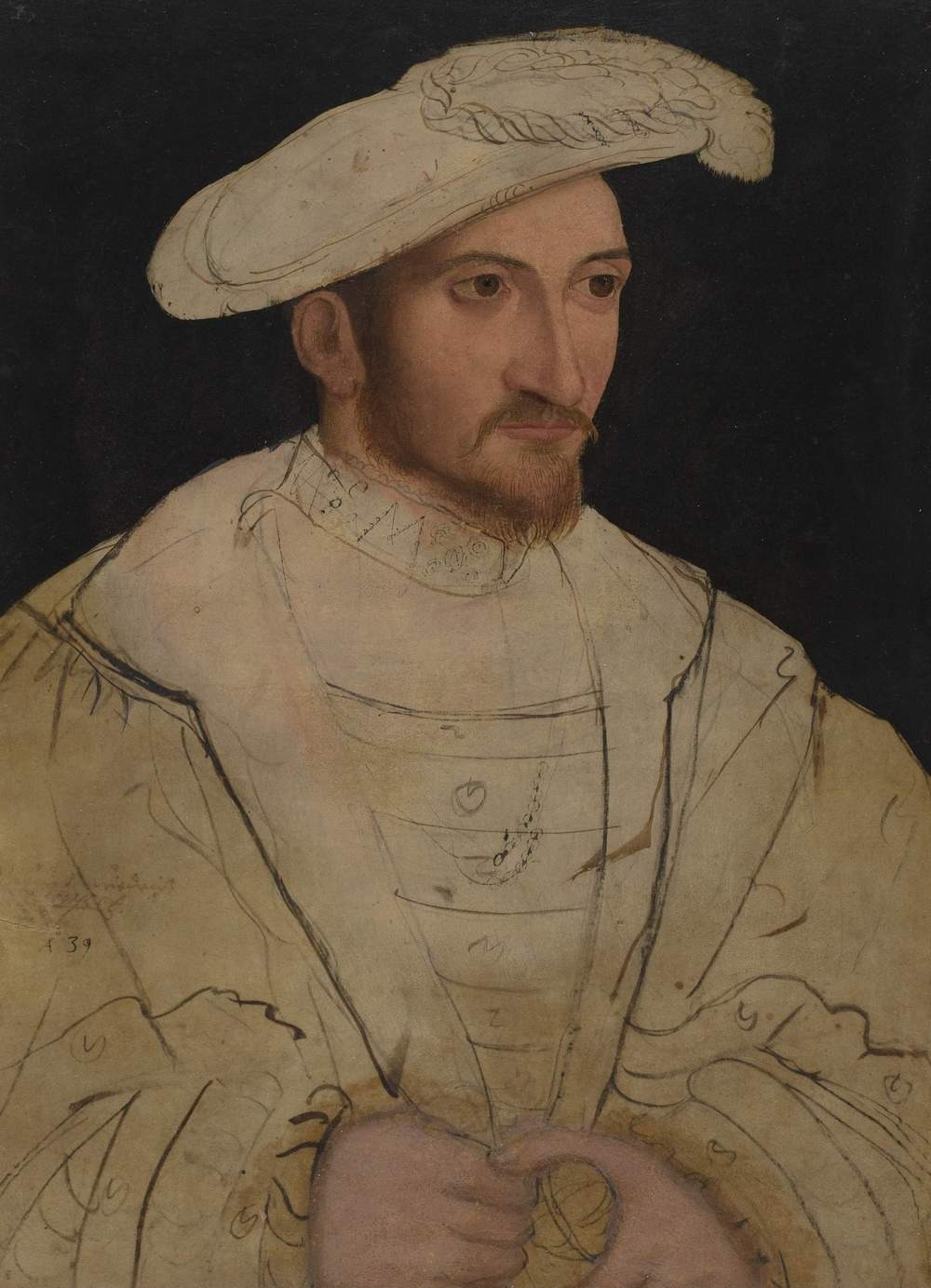
Young Frederick

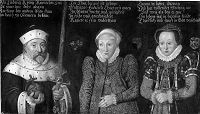
Frederick III and his wives, Marie of Brandenburg and Amalia of Neuenahr

Frederick was strictly educated in the Catholic faith at his father's court and at Cologne, but, influenced by his wife, the pious princess Maria of Brandenburg, whom he married in 1537, he followed the Reformation, and in 1546 made a public profession of his faith. He succeeded his father John II as duke of Simmern on 18 May 1557, and became elector on 12 February 1559, on the death of Otto Henry. Under his predecessor strict Lutherans like Tilemann Heshusius, Melanchthonians, and Calvinists had found a place in the Palatinate. In the summer of 1559 bitter controversies arose among them. Theses on the Lord's Supper prepared by the Heidelberg deacon Wilhelm Klebitz provoked a bitter controversy between him and Heshusius.

When efforts at mediation failed Frederick deposed both men on 16 September 1559. To get a clear understanding of the controversy Frederick spent days and nights in theological studies and was thus led more and more to the Reformed confession. A disputation held in June 1560 between the Saxon theologians Johann Stössel and Joachim Mörlin and the Heidelbergers Pierre Boquin, Thomas Erastus, and Paul Einhorn increased Frederick's dislike for the Lutheran zealots. After the Naumburg Convention (January 1561) Frederick fully adopted the Reformed dogmas.

In March 1561 he invited Emmanuel Tremellius to Heidelberg, and in September the famous Zacharius Ursinus. The whole Church was now transformed. Caspar Olevianus had been there since January 1560. Images of the saints, vestments, baptismal fonts, and other "idolatrous works," even organs, were ruthlessly removed from the churches. In the celebration of the Lord's Supper the breaking of bread was introduced. The revenues from monasteries and foundations were confiscated and applied to Evangelical church purposes or charity. The Heidelberg Catechism, prepared by a committee of theologians and ministers likely led by Ursinus, now served as the norm of doctrine and for the instruction of the youth.

The church order of 15 November 1563 and the consistory order of 1564 consolidated the changes. The opposition of ministers inclining to Lutheranism was suppressed by their dismissal. Among the Lutherans, Frederick's measures caused a great sensation. The religious colloquy held at Maulbronn in April 1564 increased the animosity. In 1565 the Emperor Maximilian ordered the changes to be annulled. A unanimous decree of the 1566 Diet of Augsburg also demanded the abolition of the changes. Frederick, however, declared in the 14 May session of the Diet that a matter was concerned over which God alone has the rule, and if it was intended to proceed against him, he would find comfort in the promises of his Saviour. The decree was not carried out.

After completing the work of reform in the Rhine Palatinate, Frederick endeavored to continue it in the Upper Palatinate; but here he was resisted by the zealous Lutheran estates. He continued his work of reform on the Rhine by introducing in 1570 a strict church discipline. Frederick pronounced the sentence of death on the Antitrinitarian Johann Sylvan based on the opinion signed by Olevianus, Ursinus, and Boquin, on 23 December 1572.

In 1562 Frederick gave Frankenthal as a refuge to the Evangelicals driven from the Netherlands. He sent his like-minded son Johann Casimir in 1567 and again in 1576 to France in aid of the Huguenots. In 1569 he assisted also Wolfgang, Count Palatine of Zweibrücken on his way to France.

Frederick's last years were troubled by domestic afflictions. As his older son Louis was a strict Lutheran, he could not hope that after his death his work would be carried out in his own spirit.

== Family and children ==
Frederick III was married twice. Firstly, he married in 1537 Marie of Brandenburg-Kulmbach (1519 – 1567), daughter of Casimir, Margrave of Brandenburg-Bayreuth and Susanna of Bavaria. Their children were:

1. Alberta (4 April 1538 – 19 March 1553)
2. Louis VI, Elector Palatine (4 July 1539 – 22 October 1583)
3. Elisabeth (30 June 1540 – 8 February 1594), married in 1558 to Duke Johann Frederick II of Saxony
4. Hermann Ludwig (6 October 1541 – 1 July 1556)
5. Johann Casimir (7 March 1543 – 16 January 1592); married: 1570 Elisabeth of Saxony (18 October 1552 - 2 April 1590)
6. Dorothea Susanne (15 November 1544 – 8 April 1592), married in 1560 to John William, Duke of Saxe-Weimar
7. Albert (30 September 1546 – 30 April 1547)
8. Anna Elisabeth (23 July 1549 – 20 September 1609), married:
  1. in 1569 to Landgrave Philipp II of Hesse-Rheinfels;
  2. in 1599 to Count Palatine John August of Veldenz
9. Christof (13 June 1551 – 14 April 1574)
10. Karl (28 December 1552 – 12 September 1555)
11. Kunigunde Jakobäa (9 October 1556 – 26 January 1586), married in 1580 to Count John VI of Nassau-Dillenburg

Secondly, he married in 1569 Amalia of Neuenahr ( 1539 – 1602), but this marriage was childless.

He died in 1576, and was succeeded as Elector Palatine by his son Louis VI. Frederick had carved out a territory from the Lower Palatine land dubbed "Pfalz-Lautern" for his second surviving son Johann Casimir as an enclave to enable the continued existence of the Reformed faith. Johann Casimir would serve as regent for the Electorate of the Palatinate upon Louis VI's death and would oversee the return of the Reformed faith to the Palatinate.

== Ancestors ==
Ancestors of Frederick III, Elector Palatine

16. Stephen, Count Palatine of Simmern-Zweibrücken
8. Frederick I, Count Palatine of Simmern
17. Anna of Veldenz
4. John I, Count Palatine of Simmern
18. Arnold, Duke of Guelders
9. Margaret of Guelders
19. Catherine of Cleves
2. John II, Count Palatine of Simmern
20. Philip I, Count of Nassau-Weilburg
10. John II of Nassau-Saarbrücken
21. Elisabeth of Lorraine-Vaudémont
5. Johanna of Nassau-Saarbrücken
22. John IV of Loon-Heinsberg
11. Johanna of Loon
23. Johanna of Diest
1. Frederick III, Elector Palatine
24. Jacob, Margrave of Baden-Baden
12. Charles I, Margrave of Baden-Baden
25. Catherine of Lorraine
6. Christopher I of Baden-Baden
26. Ernest, Duke of Austria
13. Catherine of Austria
27. Cymburgis of Masovia
3. Beatrix of Baden
28. Philip I, Count of Katzenelnbogen
14. Philip II of Katzenelnbogen
29. Anna of Württemberg
7. Ottilie of Katzenelnbogen
30. Henry II, Count of Nassau-Siegen
15. Ottilie of Nassau-Siegen
31. Genoveva of Virneburg

== Literature ==
- Böttcher, Hans-Joachim (2018). Elisabeth von Sachsen und Johann Kasimir von der Pfalz: Ein Ehe- und Religionskonflikt [Elisabeth of Saxony and John Casimir of the Palatinate: A Marital and Religious Conflict] (in German). Dresden: Dresdner Buchverlag. ISBN 9783946906063.

Frederick III, Elector Palatine House of Wittelsbach Born: 1515 Died: 1576
Regnal titles
Preceded by John II	Count Palatine of Simmern; 1557–1576	Succeeded by Louis VI (John Casimir for Lautern)
Preceded by Otto-Henry	Elector Palatine; 1559–1576	Succeeded by Louis VI (John Casimir for Lautern)
