= Frederick III of Veldenz =

Frederick III, Count of Veldenz (died 1444) was the last from the Hohengeroldseck family to rule the county - that male line died out with him, and the county passed to his son-in-law Stephen, Count Palatine of Simmern-Zweibrücken, widower of Frederick's daughter, Anna of Veldenz.

In 1437, Frederick and Jacob, Margrave of Baden-Baden jointly inherited the County of Sponheim on the death of John V, Count of Sponheim-Starkenburg.

Stephen briefly held his father-in-law's territory during 1444, dividing it that same year between his sons Frederick I, who became Count of Sponheim, and Louis I, who became Count of Veldenz. The brothers did not inherit Stephen's other holdings until his death in 1459.

== See also ==
- Veldenz, Germany
