= Elisabeth of Hesse, Countess Palatine of Zweibrücken =

Countess (1503–1563)

Elisabeth of Hesse
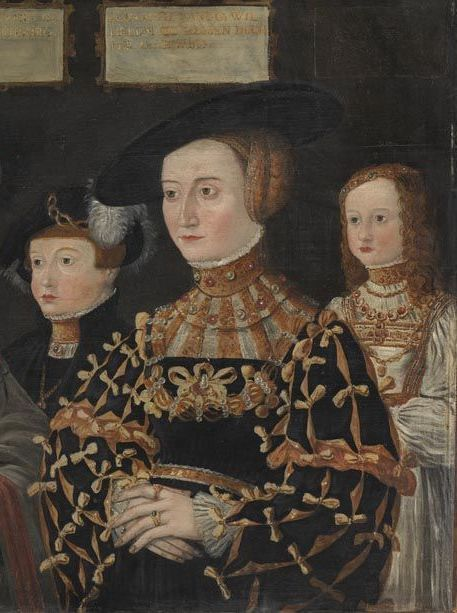
- Detail from Family Portrait of Ludwig II by Peter Gertner, c. 1530s Elisabeth is shown with her children Wolfgang and Christine
- Born: 4 March 1503
- Died: 4 January 1563 (aged 59); Lauingen
- Noble family: House of Hesse
- Spouses: Louis II, Count Palatine of Zweibrücken; George, Count Palatine of Simmern-Sponheim
- Father: William I, Landgrave of Hesse
- Mother: Anna, Duchess of Brunswick-Wolfenbüttel

Elisabeth of Hesse (4 March 1503 – 4 January 1563, Lauingen) was a Landgravine of Hesse by birth and by marriage Countess Palatine of Zweibrücken and later Countess Palatine of Simmern.

== Life ==
Elizabeth was the youngest of five daughters of Landgrave William I of Hesse (1466–1515) from his marriage to Duchess Anna of Brunswick-Wolfenbüttel (1460–1520), daughter of Duke William of Brunswick-Wolfenbüttel. Elizabeth was raised as a Protestant. In 1518, she was kidnapped by Landgrave Philip I of Hesse, who had just come of age, to prevent a marriage which her mother Anna had planned, but which Elisabeth herself was opposed to.

She married on 10 September 1525 in Kassel, Count Palatine and Duke Louis II of Zweibrücken (1502–1532). This marriage of a princess inclined to the Reformation with a close relative of Philip the Magnanimous, the largest promoter of the Reformation, gave a considerable boost to the Reformation in the Duchy of Zweibrücken. The marriage had been planned for the spring of 1525, but the German Peasants' War interfered. Elizabeth was regarded as extremely pious, affable and benevolent. She used her considerable inheritance to compensate the victims of the peasant uprising in the Duchy. After her husband's early death, Emperor Ferdinand I appointed Elisabeth and Count Palatine Rupert of Veldenz as joint regents for her young son.

On 9 January 1541, Elisabeth married her second husband, George, Count Palatine of Simmern-Sponheim (1518–1569). She made a significant contribution when she and George finally managed to enforce the reformation in Simmern.

== Issue ==
From her first marriage to Louis II of Zweibrücken, she had two children:

- Wolfgang (1526–1569), Count Palatine of Palatinate-Zweibrücken, married in 1545 Anna of Hesse (1529–1591)
- Christine (1528–1534)

From her second marriage to George of Simmern-Sponheim, she had a son:

- John (1541–1562)
