= Georg, Count Palatine of Simmern-Sponheim =

Georg (20 February 1518 – 17 May 1569) was the Count Palatine of Simmern-Sponheim from 1559 until 1569.

== Biography ==
George was born in 1518 to Johann II, Count Palatine of Simmern by his first wife, Beatrix of Baden. In 1559 his elder brother Frederick inherited the Electorate of the Palatinate and gave George his old territories inherited from his father in 1557. George married Elisabeth of Hesse, daughter of Landgrave Wilhelm I, on 9 January 1541. George died in 1569 and was succeeded in Simmern by his younger brother Reichard.

== Children ==
With Elisabeth of Hesse (4 March 1503 - 4 January 1563):

1. John (c. 7 October 1541 – 28 January 1562)

George also had a mistress in Elisabeth von Rosenfeld and fathered two illegitimate children with her:

1. Adam Rauenspurg (c.1565–1598)
2. George Rauenspurg (c.1566–1598)

== See also ==
- List of Counts Palatine of the Rhine

Regnal titles
Preceded by Frederick II	Count Palatine of Simmern-Sponheim; 1559 – 1569	Succeeded by Richard
