= Boquin =

Boquin is a surname. Notable people with the surname include:

- Juan Ángel Arias Boquín (1859–1927), President of Honduras
- Pierre Boquin (1518–1582), French theologian
