= Bolanden =

- Municipality
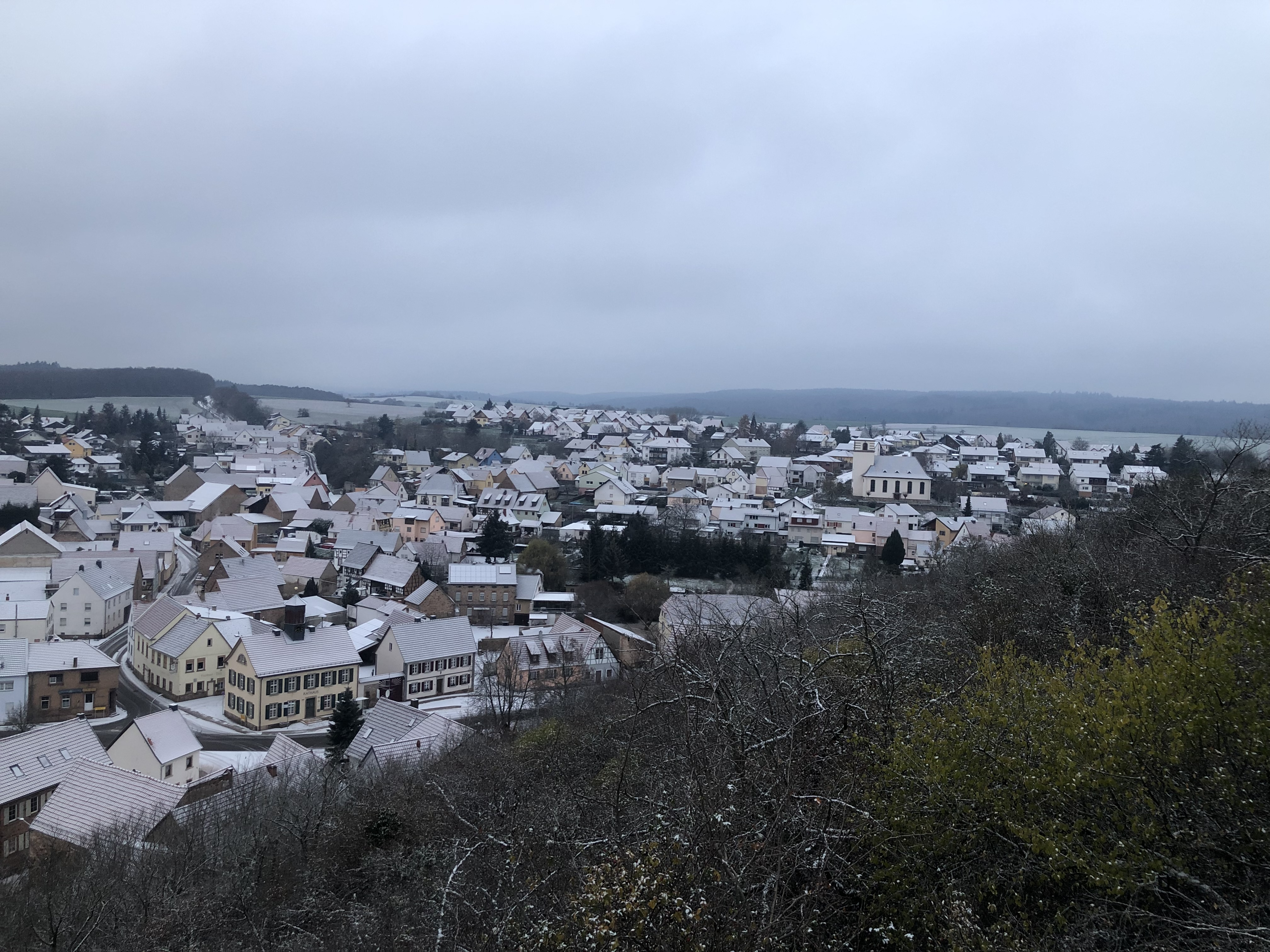
- Winter in Bolanden

- Coat of arms

- Location of Bolanden within Donnersbergkreis district
- Interactive map of Bolanden
- Location within Germany Location within Rhineland-Palatinate
- Coordinates: 49°38′22.40″N 8°0′32.66″E
- Country: Germany
- State: Rhineland-Palatinate
- District: Donnersbergkreis
- Municipal assoc.: Kirchheimbolanden
- Subdivisions: 2

Government
  - Mayor (2019–24): Armin Juchem (FW)

Area
  - Total: 17.44 km^{2} (6.73 sq mi)
- Elevation: 226 m (741 ft)

Population (2025-12-31)
  - Total: 2,319
  - Density: 133.0/km^{2} (344.4/sq mi)
- Time zone: UTC+01:00 (CET)
  - Summer (DST): UTC+02:00 (CEST)
- Postal codes: 67295
- Dialling codes: 06352
- Vehicle registration: KIB
- Website: kirchheimbolanden.de

Bolanden (German pronunciation: [boˈlandn̩]) is a municipality in the Donnersbergkreis district, in Rhineland-Palatinate, Germany.

== Sights ==
- New Bolanden Castle ruins
