= Louis I, Count Palatine of Zweibrücken =

Count Palatine and Duke of Zweibrucken, Germany (1444-1489)

Louis I of Zweibrücken
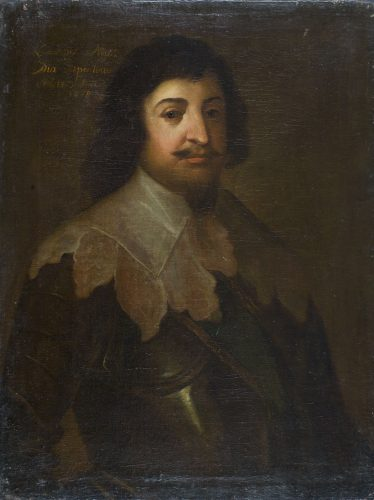
- Born: 1424
- Died: 19 July 1489 (aged 64–65); Simmern
- Noble family: House of Wittelsbach
- Spouse: Johanna of Croÿ
- Issue Detail: Kaspar; Alexander
- Father: Stephen, Count Palatine of Simmern-Zweibrücken
- Mother: Anna of Veldenz

Louis I of Zweibrücken (German: Pfalzgraf Ludwig I. von Pfalz-Zweibrücken "der Schwarze"; 1424 – 19 July 1489) was Count Palatine and Duke of Zweibrücken and Count of Veldenz from 1444 until his death in 1489.

== Life ==
He was the younger son of Stephen, Count Palatine of Simmern-Zweibrücken and his wife Anna, heiress of the County of Veldenz, whom he had wed in 1409. Although Anne died in 1439, her widower did not obtain Veldenz from her family until 1444. In that year, Stephen decided how his territories would be divided upon his death, allocating Simmern to his elder son, Frederick and Zweibrucken to his younger son Louis, combining with it Veldenz and most of the County of Sponheim.

== Family and children ==
He was married on 20 March 1454 in Luxemburg to Johanna of Croÿ, daughter of Count Antoine I de Croÿ and Margaret of Lorraine-Vaudémont. They had the following children:

1. Margarete (1456–1527), married in 1470 to Count Philip of Nassau-Idstein.
2. Kaspar (1458–1527).
3. Johanna (1459–1520), a nun at Marienberg near Boppard
4. Anna (1461–1520), a nun at Marienberg near Boppard.
5. Alexander (1462–1514).
6. David (1463–1478).
7. Albrecht (1464–1513), a canon in Strassburg and Köln.
8. Katharina (1465–1542), Abbess of St. Agnes, Trier.
9. Philipp (1467–1489), a canon in Strassburg.
10. Johann (1468–1513), a canon in Strassburg and Köln.
11. Elisabeth (1469–1500), married in 1492 to Count John Louis of Nassau-Saarbrücken.
12. Samson (1474–1480)

== Ancestors ==
Ancestors of Louis I, Count Palatine of Zweibrücken

16. Adolf, Count Palatine of the Rhine
8. Rupert II, Elector Palatine
17. Irmengard of Oettingen
4. Rupert of Germany
18. Peter II of Sicily
9. Beatrice of Sicily
19. Elisabeth of Carinthia
2. Stephen, Count Palatine of Simmern-Zweibrücken
20. John II of Nuremberg
10. Frederick V, Burgrave of Nuremberg
21. Elisabeth of Henneberg-Schleusingen
5. Elisabeth of Nuremberg
22. Frederick II, Margrave of Meissen
11. Elisabeth of Meissen
23. Matilda of Bavaria
1. Louis I, Count Palatine of Zweibrücken
24. Henry II of Veldenz
12. Henry III of Veldenz
25. Agnes of Sponheim-Kreuznach
6. Frederick III of Veldenz
26. Johann III, Count of Sponheim-Starkenburg
13. Loretta of Sponheim-Starkenburg
27. Matilda of the Palatinate
3. Anna of Veldenz
28. Gerlach I, Count of Nassau
14. John I, Count of Nassau-Weilburg
29. Agnes of Hesse
7. Margaret of Nassau-Saarbrücken
30. John II, Count of Saarbrücken
15. Joanna of Saarbrücken
31. Gilette of Bar-Pierrefort

Louis I, Count Palatine of Zweibrücken House of Wittelsbach Born: 1424 Died: 19 July 1489
Preceded by Stephen	Count Palatine of Zweibrücken; 1444–1489	Succeeded by Kaspar and Alexander
Preceded by Stephen	Count of Veldenz; 1444–1489	Succeeded by Kaspar and Alexander
