= Palatinate-Simmern-Sponheim =

Palatinate-Simmern-Sponheim; Pfalz-Simmern-Sponheim
1559–1598
Capital; Circle; Bench	Simmern; Upper Rhenish; Council of Princes
Established	1559
Extinct; to the Palatinate	1598

Palatinate-Simmern-Sponheim (German: Pfalz-Simmern-Sponheim) was a state of the Holy Roman Empire based in the County Palatine of Simmern and the Palatinian portion of the County of Sponheim in modern Rhineland-Palatinate, Germany.

Palatinate-Simmern-Sponheim was created in 1559 when Frederick III of Palatinate-Simmern inherited the Electoral Palatinate and George, his younger brother, became Count Palatine of Simmern-Sponheim. George died in 1569 and was succeeded by another younger brother, Richard. After Richard's death in 1598, Palatinate-Simmern-Sponheim passed to Frederick IV, Elector Palatine.

== See also ==
- List of Counts Palatine of the Rhine

Name	Notes
George	1559–1569
Richard	1569–1598
