= John of Palatinate-Simmern, Archbishop of Magdeburg =

German nobleman and bishop

- Born: c. 1429
- Died: 13 December 1475; Giebichenstein Castle
- Buried: Magdeburg Cathedral
- Noble family: House of Wittelsbach
- Father: Stephen
- Mother: Anna of Veldenz

John of Palatinate-Simmern (c. 1429 – 13 December 1475 at Giebichenstein Castle) was a German nobleman. He was bishop of Münster and later Archbishop of Magdeburg.

== Life ==
He was the son of Count Palatine Stephen of Simmer-Zweibrücken and his wife, Anna of Veldenz. He studied in Rome and Bologna. In 1458, he became Bishop of Münster.

After the death of Archbishop Frederick III of Magdeburg on 11 November 1464, the cathedral chapter unanimously elected John as his successor on 13 December 1464. On 18 June 1465, his election was confirmed by Pope Paul II. He formally became Archbishop when he received the papal bull, however, he had incurred debts in Münster and he was unable to accept his new office until the spring of 1466. He was inaugurated in Magdeburg, although Halle was the official capital of his bishopric, because the citizens of Halle opposed him. On 9 July 1467, he reached a compromise with the city of Halle. He paid 3000 Rhenish florins and the city paid him homage on 17 July.

In order to expand the influence of the bishopric, he acquired several possessions, including Bernburg, Sandersleben, Gröbzig, Wormsdorf, Hohenerxleben, Gänsefurth and Jerichow. He also tried to promote peaceful relations between his bishopric and its neighbour states. In 1471, he participated in the public peace of Nuremberg and fought against the robber barons in the area. He mediated between the Hanseatic cities and Brandenburg. He helped the cities in his territory develop by granting them more freedom.

On 7 November 1467, John and the citizens of Calvörde besieged Calvörde Castle, in order to arrest Frederick and Bernd von Alvensleben for street robbery in Calvörde and robbing merchants from Breslau. The brothers were also wanted by Duke Henry II of Brunswick-Lüneburg for highway robbery.

John died on 13 December 1475, exactly eleven years after his election. He died at his residence, Giebichenstein Castle. He was buried in Magdeburg Cathedral, next to his predecessor Frederick III of Beichlingen.

John of Palatinate-Simmern, Archbishop of Magdeburg House of Wittelsbach Born: c. 1429 Died: 13 December 1475
Preceded by Henry II	Bishop of Münster; 1458-1466	Succeeded by Henry III
Preceded by Frederick III	Archbishop of Magdeburg; 1466-1475	Succeeded by Ernest II
