= Reichard, Count Palatine of Simmern-Sponheim =

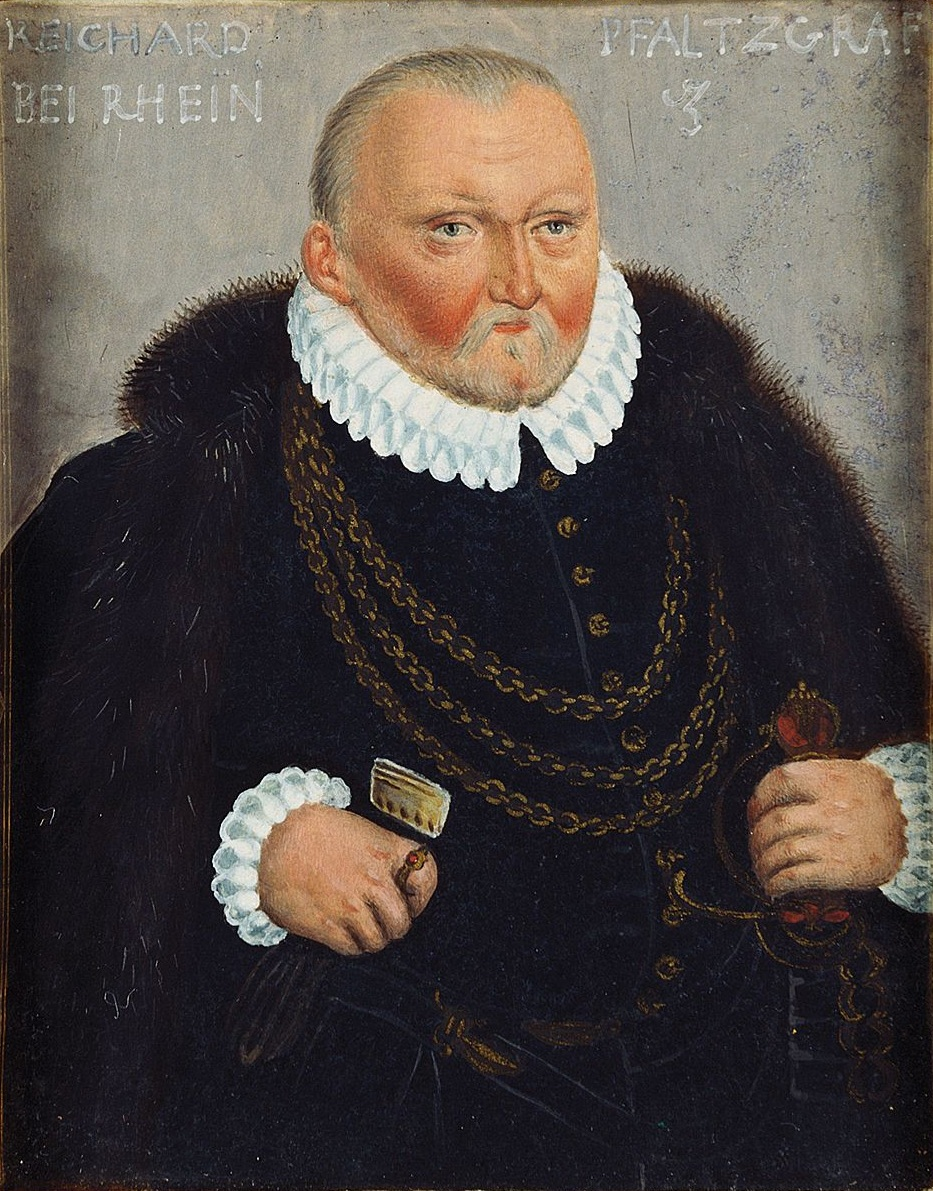

Reichard (25 July 1521 – 13 January 1598) was the Count Palatine of Simmern-Sponheim from 1569 until 1598.

Reichard was born in Simmern in 1521 to Johann II, Count Palatine of Simmern. In 1569 he succeeded his brother Georg as Count Palatine of Simmern-Sponheim. Reichard died in Simmern in 1598. Without any surviving children, Simmern-Sponheim was inherited by his great-nephew Frederick IV.

== Marriage ==
Reichard married Juliane of Wied (c. 1545 - 30 April 1575, daughter of Count Johann IV of Wied, on 30 July 1569 and had several children:

1. Juliana (21 November 1571 – 4 February 1592)
2. Katherine (10 May 1573 – 12 October 1576)
3. unnamed son (1574)
4. unnamed son (30 April 1575)

Reichard married Emilie of Württemberg (19 August 1550 - 4 June 1589), daughter of Christoph, Duke of Württemberg, on 26 March 1578.

Reichard married Anne Margaret of Palatinate-Veldenz (17 January 1571 - 1 November 1621), daughter of Count Palatine Georg Johann I, on 14 December 1589.

Regnal titles
Preceded by Georg	Count Palatine of Simmern-Sponheim; 1569 – 1598	Succeeded by Frederick IV
