= Anna of Veldenz, Countess Palatine of Simmern-Zweibrücken =

Anna of Veldenz
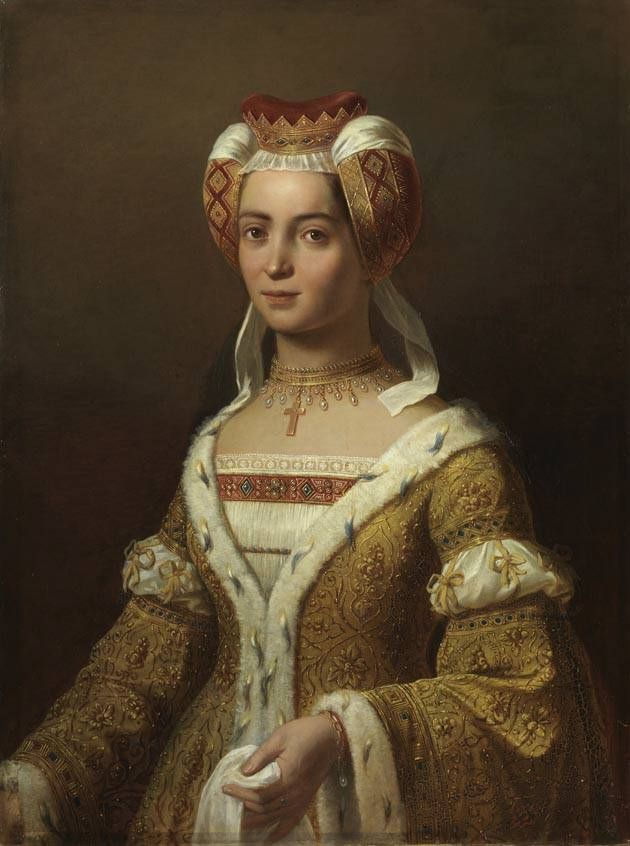
- Countess Anna of Veldenz
- Born: c. 1390
- Died: 18 November 1439; Wachenheim
- Noble family: Hohengeroldseck
- Spouse: Stephen, Count Palatine of Simmern-Zweibrücken
- Issue Detail: Frederick I; Rupert; Louis I; John
- Father: Frederick III, Count of Veldenz
- Mother: Margaret of Nassau-Saarbrücken

Anne of Veldenz (c. 1390 – 18 November 1439 in Wachenheim) was a Countess suo jure of Veldenz. She was a member of the Hohengeroldseck family, the second family to rule Veldenz.

== Life ==
Anna was the daughter and heiress of Frederick III, Count of Veldenz, the last from the Hohengeroldseck family to rule the county, and his wife Margaret of Nassau-Saarbrücken. In 1409, she married Stephen, Count Palatine of Simmern-Zweibrücken, thereby bringing the County of Veldenz into the possession of the Dukes of Palatinate-Zweibrücken. She also brought a 50% share in the County of Sponheim into the marriage. The Counts of Veldenz had acquired this share in 1425, as had been predicted by Count John V of Sponheim-Starkenburg in the 1425 Treaty of Sponheim. Anna's eldest son Frederick I would inherit her share in the County of Sponheim, her son Louis I would inherit the County of Veldenz proper.

In the 19th century, a descendant of Anna became King of Bavaria, which is why the Veldenz lion is now part of the Bavarian coat of arms.

== Issue ==
From her marriage with Stephen, Anna had the following children:

1. Anne (1413 – 12 March 1455)
2. Margaret (1416 – 23 November 1426)
3. Frederick I (24 April 1417 – 29 November 1480)
4. Rupert (1420 – 17 October 1478)
5. Stephen (1421 – 4 September 1485)
6. Louis I (1424 – 19 July 1489)
7. John (1429–1475).

Through Frederick I, she was an ancestor of a line of nobles including Frederick III, Elector Palatine (1515-1576), Johann II, Duke of Saxe-Weimar (1570-1605), Ernest I, Duke of Saxe-Gotha (1601-1675), and through the latter, the Royal Houses of the United Kingdom, Russia, and other European countries.

== Ancestry ==
Ancestors of Anna of Veldenz, Countess Palatine of Simmern-Zweibrücken

8. Henry II of Veldenz (d. 1378)
4. Henry III of Veldenz (d. 1389)
9. Agnes of Sponheim-Kreuznach
2. Frederick III of Veldenz (d. 1444)
10. John III, Count of Sponheim-Starkenburg (d. 1398)
5. Loretta of Sponheim-Starkenburg
11. Matilda of the Palatinate (d. 1375)
1. Anna of Veldenz
12. Gerlach I, Count of Nassau (d. 1361)
6. John I, Count of Nassau-Weilburg (d. 1371)
13. Agnes of Hesse (d. 1332)
3. Margaret of Nassau-Saarbrücken (d. 1427)
14. John II, Count of Saarbrücken (d. 1381)
7. Johanna of Saarbrücken (d. 1381)
15. Ghislette of Bar
