= Pierre Boquin =

French Reformed Theologian

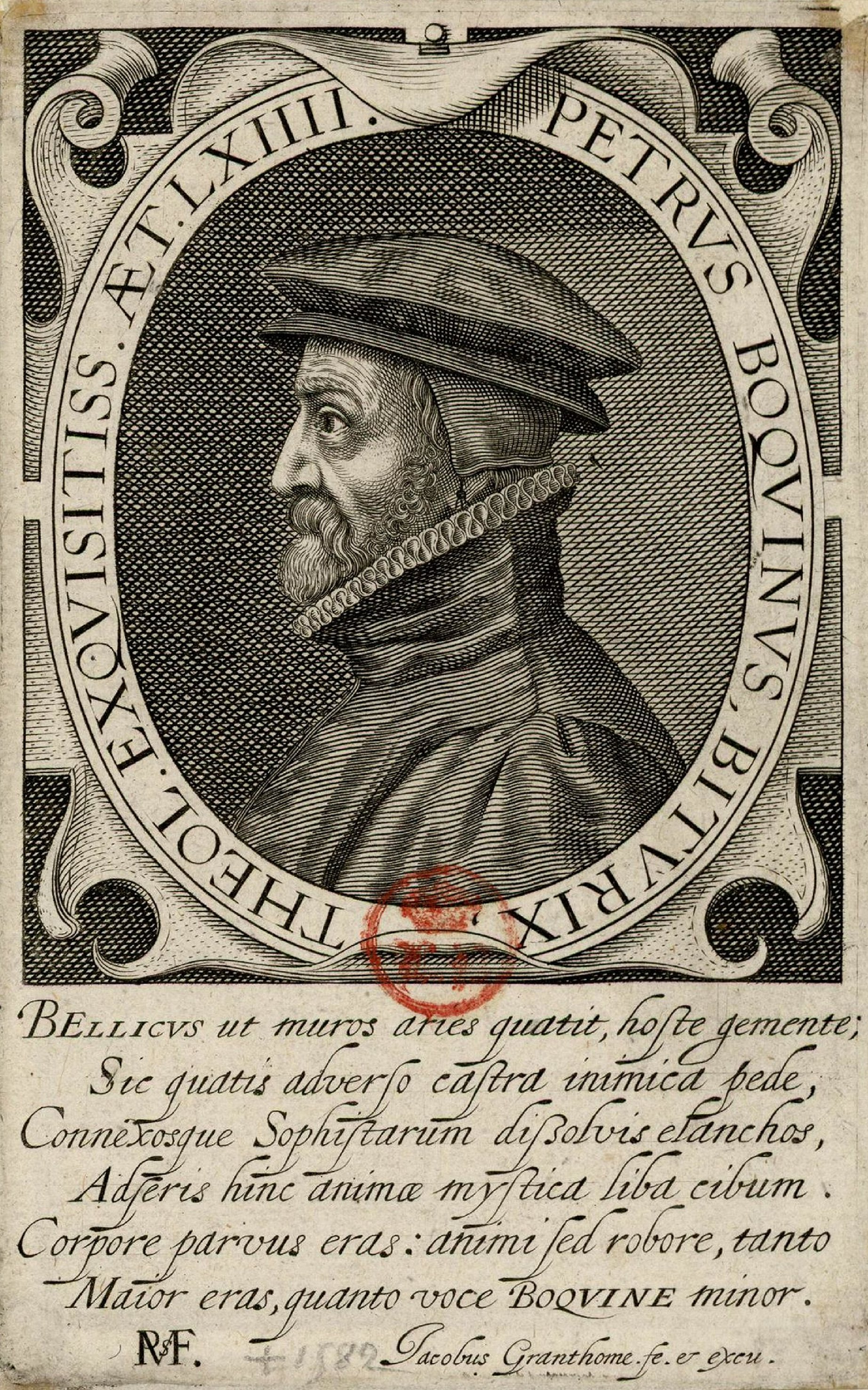
Portrait of Pierre Bouquin by Jacques Granthomme the Younger

Pierre Boquin (also known as Bouquin, Boucquin, or Petrus Boquinus; post 1518 –1582 in Lausanne) was a French Reformed Theologian who played a critical role in the Reformation of the Electoral Palatinate.

== Origins and early career ==
Pierre Boquin was probably born after 1518 in Guyenne in Western France. He earned a doctorate in theology in 1539 at the University of Bourges. He was briefly a member of the Carmelite Order even serving as prior of the Bourges community before leaving in 1541 due to his turn toward Protestantism. He fled through Basel and Leipzig to Wittenberg. He joined the faculty of the Strasbourg Academy in 1542 as the successor of John Calvin.

Towards the end of that year he returned to Bourges to lecture at the university under the protection of Queen Marguerite de Navarre. Bouquin also served as cathedral preacher in Bourges, but he lost this position in short order due to his Protestant convictions. Because of this he was brought up on charges before the Archbishop of Paris, which he wholly escaped by fleeing again to Strasbourg in 1555. He served there for two years from 1555 as preacher for the church of the French refugee community.

== Activity in the Electorate of the Palatinate ==
He was appointed Professor of Theology at the University of Heidelberg in 1557. He served as dean of the theological faculty, and Frederick III tapped him to serve on the church council due to his Reformed opinions. In June 1560, he participated in a disputation with Saxon Lutherans from the court of John Frederick II on the Lord's Supper, chiefly against Johann Stössel. He also participated in the Maulbronn Colloquy in April 1564, a debate with the Lutheran theologians of Württemberg, chiefly Jakob Andreae, over the presence of Christ in the Eucharist. There is currently no consensus on how large a role should be attributed to Boquin in the composition of the Heidelberg Catechism, although he was certainly a prime theological authority in that period alongside the principal author Zacharias Ursinus. He supported the doctoral promotion of the Englishman George Withers at the University of Heidelberg in 1568, which in part helped to ignite the controversy over church discipline between the Calvinist disciplinist party and Thomas Erastus.

== Late career ==
When Frederick III died on 26 October 1576, his son Elector Louis VI returned the Palatinate to the Lutheran confession. To this end he released Reformed teachers and preachers, and therefore, Bouquin lost his post. He accepted a position in Bernese territory as preacher and instructor at the Lausanne Academy in 1578. He died four years later.

== Works ==
- Ad calumnias doctoris cujusdam Avii in Evangelii professores Defensio n.p., 1558
- Apodeixis antichristianismi, qua christianismum veram religionem, pharisaismum christianismo contrarium, papismum pharisaismo simillimum esse ostenditur (Geneva 1583)* Examen libri, quem D. Til. Heshusius nuper scripsit de praesentia corporis Christi in coena Domini (Basel 1561)
- Assertio veteris et veri christianismi adversus novum et fictum jesuitismum (Heidelberg 1579)
- Exegesis divinae atque humanae koinonías (Heidelberg 1561)
- Oratio de Vita et morte illustrissimi Principis D.D. Friderici III.... [Heidelberg]: Apud Ioannem Mareschallum, 1577.
