= John V, Count of Sponheim-Starkenburg =

German nobleman

John V, Count of Sponheim-Starkenburg (c. 1359 - 24 October 1437) was a German nobleman.

He was the son of John IV, Count of Sponheim-Starkenburg and Elisabeth of Sponheim.
He ruled the paternal line of the county of Sponheim from 1414 and the re-unified county of Sponheim from 1417 until his death.

He was the last of the Sponheim-Starkenburg line - after his death the county split between Jacob, Margrave of Baden-Baden and Frederick III, Count of Veldenz. These were the grandsons of his two aunts Mathilda and Loretta of Sponheim.
