= Van Diest =

Coat of arms of the Diest family

The Diest family or Van Diest was an old Dutch noble family, originating the Duchy of Brabant, whose members occupied prominent ecclesiastical positions in the medieval times.

van Diest is also a surname.

== Notable people ==
- Jan III van Diest (died 1340), Dutch bishop
- Peter van Diest (15th century), Dutch dramatist
- Isala Van Diest (1842–1916), Belgian feminist
- Mike Van Diest (21st century), Carroll College football coach
