= John I, Count Palatine of Simmern =

Count Palatine of Simmern (1480-1509)

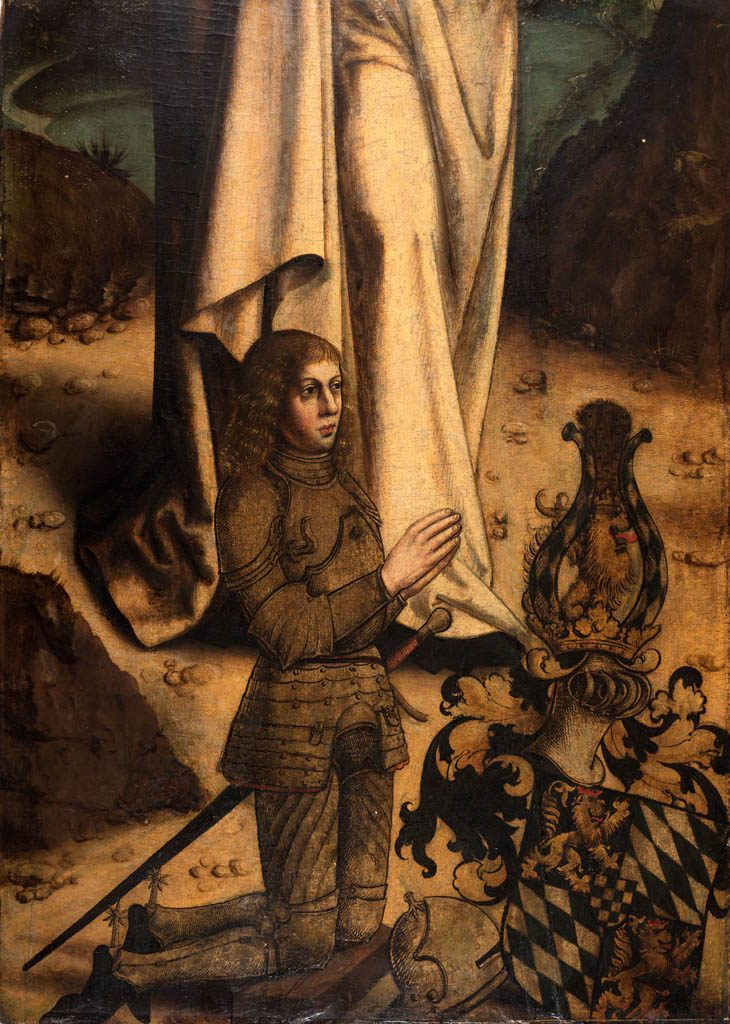
- Johan I, count palatine of Simmern
- Born: 15 May 1459
- Died: 27 January 1509 (aged 49)
- Noble family: House of Wittelsbach
- Spouse: Joanna of Nassau-Saarbrücken (1464 - 1521)
- Issue Detail: John II
- Father: Frederick I, Count Palatine of Simmern
- Mother: Margaret of Guelders

John I (15 May 1459 – 27 January 1509) was the Count Palatine of Simmern from 1480 until 1509.

== Early life and ancestry ==
John was born in 1459, into the Palatinate branch of the House of Wittelsbach, as the son of Frederick I, Count Palatine of Simmern and his wife, Margaret of Guelders, herself the second-eldest daughter of Arnold of Egmond, Duke of Guelders.

== Marriage ==
He married on 29 September 1481 Countess Joanna of Nassau-Saarbrücken (1464 - 1521), member of the House of Nassau.

She was an elder daughter of Johann II, Count of Nassau-Saarbrücken by his first wife, Countess Johanna of Hainsberg-Loon (1443–1469), a daughter of John IV, Count of Loon.

== Children ==
With Countess Johanna of Nassau-Saarbrücken (14 April 1464 – 7 May 1521)

1. Frederick (1490)
2. John II (21 March 1492 – 18 May 1557)
3. Frederick (1494–?)

== Death ==
John I, Count Palatine of Simmern died on 27 January 1509 in Starkenburg, Rhineland-Palatinate, aged 49.

He was interred, alongside his wife, Countess Johanna, in the Saint Stephen’s Evangelical Church, Simmern, Rhein-Hunsrück-Kreis, Germany.

John I, Count Palatine of Simmern House of Wittelsbach Born: 15 May 1459 Died: 27 January 1509
German nobility
Preceded by Frederick I	Count Palatine of Simmern; 1480–1509	Succeeded by John II
