= House of Palatinate-Simmern =

German royal dynasty

- Arms of Palatinate-Simmern
- Parent house: House of Wittelsbach
- Country: Germany
- Founded: 1410; 616 years ago
- Final head: Charles II
- Connected families: House of Hanover; House of Windsor
- Dissolution: 1685; 341 years ago

The House of Palatinate-Simmern (German: Pfalz-Simmern) was a German-Bavarian cadet branch of the House of Wittelsbach. The house was one of the collateral lineages of the Palatinate. It became the main branch in 1559.

The Palatinate line of the House of Wittelsbach was divided into four lines after the death of Rupert III in 1410, including the line of Palatinate-Simmern with its capital in Simmern. In 1559 the Counts palatine of Simmern succeeded the extinct main branch as Electors of Palatinate. This line in turn became extinct in 1685 with the death of Charles II. The House of Palatinate-Neuburg line inherited then the Electorate.

The founder of the Simmern line, Stephen, Count Palatine of Simmern-Zweibrücken is also the founder of the cadet branch House of Palatinate-Zweibrücken and its cadet branches. The rights over the County of Veldenz and a share of the County of Sponheim, transmitted by Stephen's wife Anna of Veldenz, were held by these lineages.

The house of Palatine-Simmern, in the person of the 1st elector, Frederick III, were staunch Calvinists. Frederick III was a devout convert to Calvinism, and made the Reformed confession the official religion of his domain by overseeing the composition and promulgation of the Heidelberg Catechism. His support of Calvinism gave the German Reformed movement a foothold and base within the Holy Roman Empire. It was also part of the appeal of Frederick V to the Bohemians in electing him King.

As of 2022, those in the line of succession to the British throne are Protestant descendants of Sophia, who was born into the house (daughter of Frederick V and Elizabeth Stuart) as Princess palatine of the Rhine, later becoming Electress consort of Hanover. The Jacobite pretenders since 3 February 1919 have been members of the House of Palatinate-Zweibrücken-Birkenfeld (they have been the Heads of the House of Wittelsbach since 1921 as well) which is another Palatinan branch of the House of Wittelsbach and its current only surviving non-morganatic branch.

== Rulers of Simmern ==
=== Counts Palatine of Simmern ===
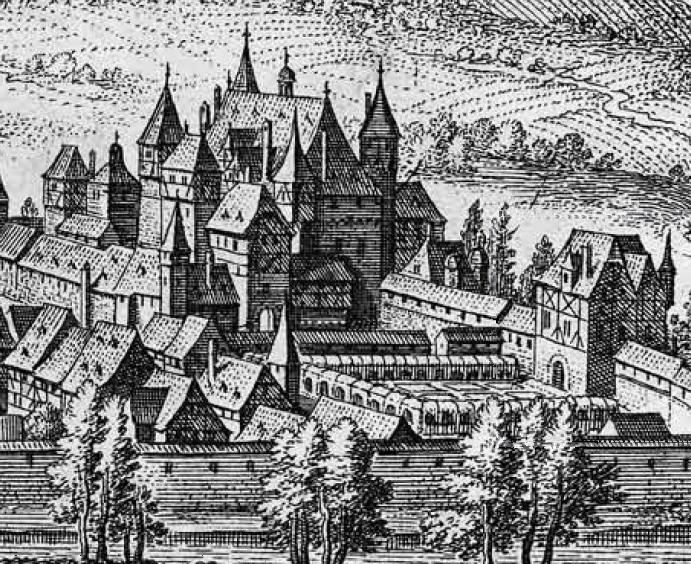
Simmern Castle 1648

- Stefan 1410–1444
- Frederick I 1444–1480
- John I 1480–1509
- John II 1509–1557
- following Frederick, as II 1557–became Elector

=== Electors of the Palatinate ===
- Frederick III 1559–1576
- Louis VI 1576–1583
- Frederick IV 1583–1610
- Frederick V 1610–1623
- Charles I Louis 1649–1680
- Charles II 1680–1685

== See also ==
- Palatinate (disambiguation)
