= Stephen, Count Palatine of Simmern-Zweibrücken =

German noble (1385–1459)

Stephen
- Count Palatine of Simmern--Zweibrücken
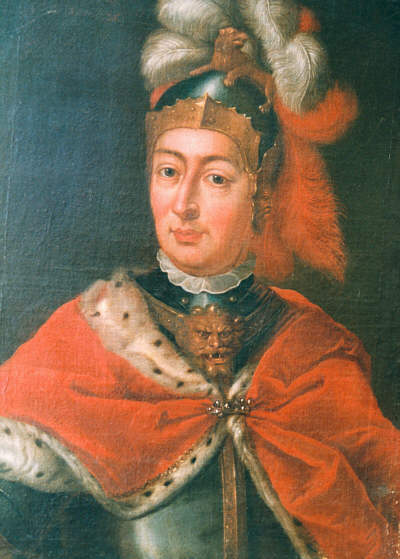
- Portrait of Stefan, Count Palatine of Simmern-Zweibrücken
- Born: 23 June 1385
- Died: 14 February 1459 (aged 73); Simmern
- Noble family: Wittelsbach
- Spouse: Anna of Veldenz
- Issue Detail: Frederick I; Rupert; Louis I; John
- Father: Rupert of Germany
- Mother: Elisabeth of Nuremberg

Stephen of Simmern-Zweibrücken (German: Stefan Pfalzgraf von Simmern-Zweibrücken) (23 June 1385 – 14 February 1459, Simmern) was Count Palatine of Simmern and Zweibrücken from 1410 until his death in 1459.

== Life ==
He was the son of King Rupert of Germany and his wife Elisabeth of Nuremberg. After the death of Rupert the Palatinate was divided between four of his surviving sons. Louis III received the main part, John received Palatinate-Neumarkt, Stephen received Palatinate-Simmern and Otto received Palatinate-Mosbach.

In June of 1410, Stephen married Anna of Veldenz, who died in 1439. After the death of Anna's father in 1444, Stephen also gained control of Veldenz and of the Veldenz share of Sponheim. In the same year, he also divided the country between his sons Frederick I, who became Count Palatine of Simmern, and Louis I, who became Count Palatine of Zweibrücken. In 1448 he succeeded to one part of Palatinate-Neumarkt and sold the other to his younger brother Otto.

== Family ==
Stefan and his wife, Anna of Veldenz had seven children:

1. Anne (1413 – 12 March 1455)
2. Margaret (1416 – 23 November 1426)
3. Frederick I (24 April 1417 – 29 November 1480)
4. Rupert (1420 – 17 October 1478)
5. Stephen (1421 – 4 September 1485) Canon in Strasbourg, Mainz, Cologne, Speyer and Liège
6. Louis I (1424 – 19 July 1489)
7. John (1429–1475), Archbishop of Magdeburg

== Death ==
He died on 14 February 1459, Simmern] and was buried in the Schlosskirche (German: palace church), formerly the church of the Knights Hospitallers in Meisenheim.

== Ancestry ==
Ancestors of Stephen, Count Palatine of Simmern-Zweibrücken

16. Rudolf I of Bavaria
8. Adolf of the Rhine
17. Mechtild of Nassau
4. Rupert II of the Rhine
18. Louis VI of Oettingen
9. Irmengard of Oettingen
19. Agnes of Württemberg
2. Rupert of Germany
20. Frederick III of Sicily
10. Peter II of Sicily
21. Eleanor of Anjou
5. Beatrice of Sicily
22. Otto III of Carinthia
11. Elizabeth of Carinthia
23. Euphemia of Silesia-Liegnitz
1. Stephen, Count Palatine of Simmern
24. Frederick IV of Nuremberg
12. John II of Nuremberg
25. Margarete of Görz
6. Frederick V of Nuremberg
26. Berthold VII of Henneberg-Schleusingen
13. Elisabeth of Henneberg
27. Adelheid of Hesse
3. Elisabeth of Nuremberg
28. Frederick I of Meissen
14. Frederick II of Meissen
29. Elisabeth of Lobdeburg-Arnshaugk
7. Elisabeth of Meissen
30. Louis IV, Holy Roman Emperor
15. Matilda of Bavaria
31. Beatrice of Silesia

Stephen, Count Palatine of Simmern-Zweibrücken House of Wittelsbach Born: 1385 Died: 1459
German royalty
Regnal titles
Preceded by Rupert III	Count Palatine of Simmern; 1410–1459	Succeeded by Frederick I
Preceded by Rupert III	Count Palatine of Zweibrücken; 1410–1459	Succeeded by Louis I
Preceded by Frederick III	Count at Sponheim; 1444–1444	Succeeded by Frederick I
Preceded by Frederick III	Count of Veldenz; 1444–1444	Succeeded by Louis I
