= Simmern im Hunsrück =

- Town
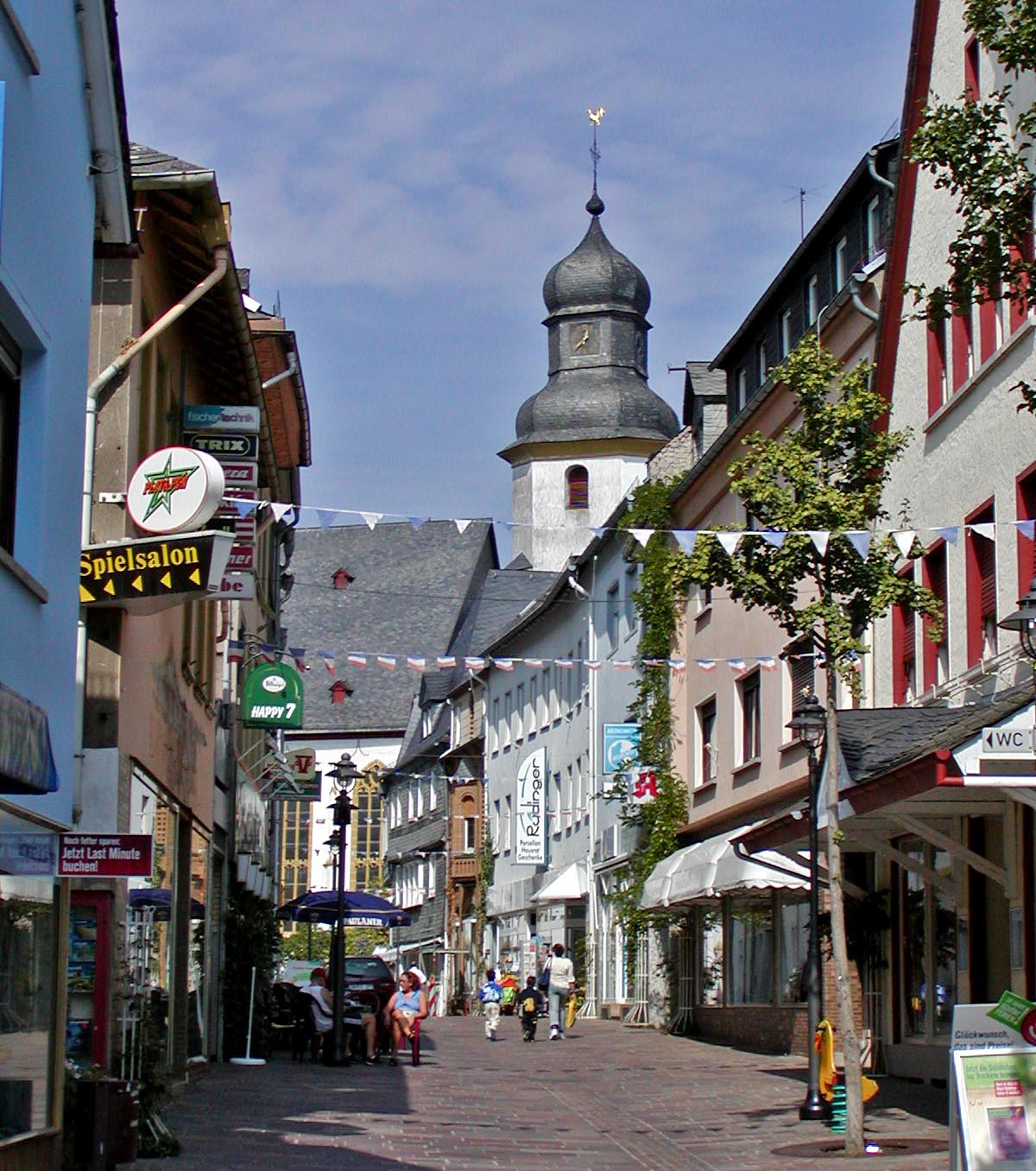

- Coat of arms

- Location of Simmern im Hunsrück within Rhein-Hunsrück-Kreis district
- Interactive map of Simmern im Hunsrück
- Location within Germany Location within Rhineland-Palatinate
- Coordinates: 49°59′N 7°31′E
- Country: Germany
- State: Rhineland-Palatinate
- District: Rhein-Hunsrück-Kreis
- Municipal assoc.: Simmern-Rheinböllen

Government
  - Mayor (2019–24): Dr. Andreas Nikolay (CDU)

Area
  - Total: 11.96 km^{2} (4.62 sq mi)
- Elevation: 400 m (1,300 ft)

Population (2025-12-31)
  - Total: 8,227
  - Density: 687.9/km^{2} (1,782/sq mi)
- Time zone: UTC+01:00 (CET)
  - Summer (DST): UTC+02:00 (CEST)
- Postal codes: 55469
- Dialling codes: 06761
- Vehicle registration: SIM, GOA
- Website: www.simmern.de

Simmern (German pronunciation: [ˈzɪmɐn]; officially Simmern/Hunsrück) is a town of roughly 8,155 inhabitants (Dec. 2023) in Rhineland-Palatinate, Germany, the district seat of the Rhein-Hunsrück-Kreis, and the seat of the Verbandsgemeinde Simmern-Rheinböllen. In the Rhineland-Palatinate state development plan, it is set out as a middle centre.

== Geography ==
=== Location ===
Simmern, through whose municipal area the 50th parallel of north latitude runs, lies in the Hunsrück in the so-called Simmerner Mulde ("Simmern Hollow"). The old town centre is found in the valley of the Simmerbach, while the newer neighbourhoods are spread over the surrounding heights. The Külzbach empties into the Simmerbach on the town's western outskirts. East of the town is a recreational area with a manmade lake, the Simmersee. South of the town is the town forest, which forms the edge of the Soonwald, a heavily wooded section of the west-central Hunsrück.

The municipal area measures 1,196 ha. Of interest to visitors are Simmern's value as a nature and leisure site, and its central location right near three rivers, the Moselle, the Rhine and the Nahe, each about 25 km away, allowing easy day trips to other nearby places.

Simmern lies 630 km from Berlin and 55 km west of Mainz.

=== Climate ===
Yearly precipitation in Simmern amounts to 690 mm, which falls into the middle third of the precipitation chart for all Germany. Only at 38% of the German Weather Service's weather stations are lower figures recorded. The driest month is January. The most rainfall comes in August. In that month, precipitation is 2.1 times what it is in January. Precipitation varies greatly. Only at 25% of the weather stations are higher seasonal swings recorded. The Köppen Climate Classification subtype for this climate is "Cfb" (Marine West Coast Climate/Oceanic climate).

Climate data for Simmern-Rheinböllen
Month	Jan	Feb	Mar	Apr	May	Jun	Jul	Aug	Sep	Oct	Nov	Dec	Year
Mean daily maximum °C (°F)	1 (34)	2 (36)	7 (44)	11 (52)	15 (59)	18 (65)	20 (68)	19 (66)	17 (63)	12 (53)	6 (42)	2 (36)	11 (52)
Mean daily minimum °C (°F)	−3 (26)	−3 (26)	0 (32)	3 (38)	7 (44)	10 (50)	12 (53)	11 (52)	9 (49)	6 (42)	2 (35)	−2 (29)	4 (40)
Average precipitation mm (inches)	64 (2.5)	58 (2.3)	48 (1.9)	43 (1.7)	69 (2.7)	69 (2.7)	76 (3)	86 (3.4)	51 (2)	53 (2.1)	56 (2.2)	66 (2.6)	740 (29.2)
Source: Weatherbase

== History ==
=== Middle Ages and Early Modern Times ===
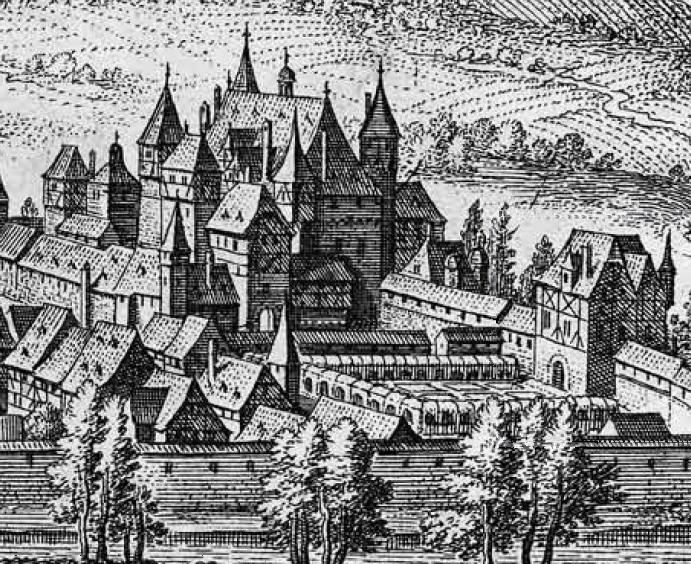
Schloss Simmern as depicted by Matthäus Merian in 1648

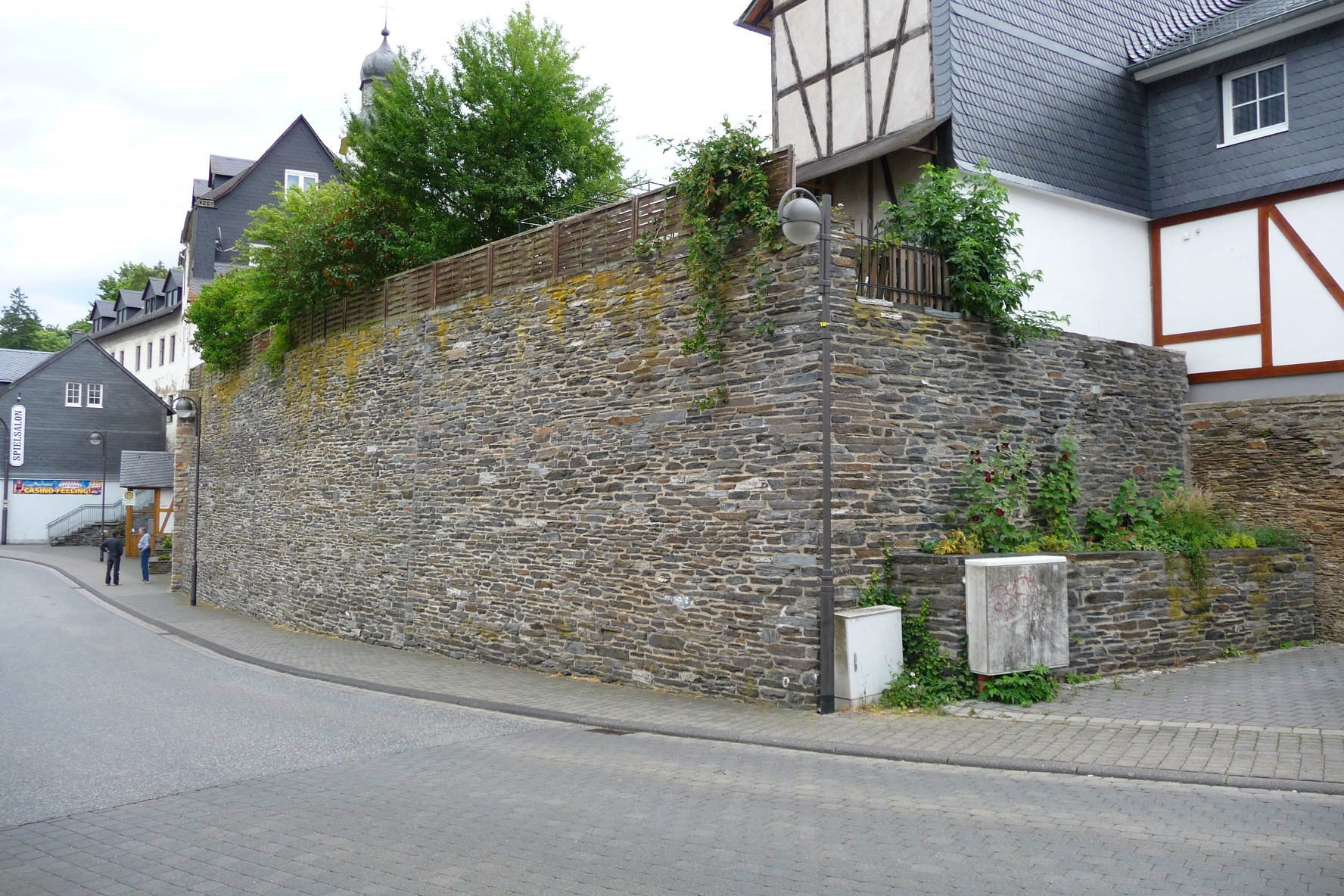
Remnants of the mediaeval town wall

In 1072, Simmern had its first documentary mention. The place where the town now stands, however, was already settled in Roman times. There are seemingly mentions before the 11th century, but these cannot be definitively linked to the town, or most likely refer to the Simmerbach, the local river. Simmern lay on the important Bingen-to-Trier army road. It belonged at first to the Counts of the Nahegau, later passing to the Raugraves, who were enfeoffed with Simmern by the Electorate of Trier sometime between 1323 and 1330. Presumably with Archbishop Baldwin's help, Simmern was granted town rights in 1330 by Emperor Louis the Bavarian. The weekly and yearly markets were soon drawing dealers throughout the Hunsrück to town, leading to flourishing trade and business. Along with town rights came the town's right to fortify itself, and this it did with a formidable double wall, complete with a series of towers and gates. Before the 14th century was over, Simmern passed to the Counts Palatine of the House of Wittelsbach.

The Palatine Wittelsbachs were, beginning in 1356, Electors, and after Elector Palatine and King of the Romans (German King) Ruprecht III's death, they split into several lines, among which was the Palatinate-Simmern line, which kept its residence in the town. Worthy of mention are the Dukes Stefan of Palatinate-Simmern-Zweibrücken, Friedrich I of Palatinate-Simmern, Johann I and, above all, Johann II. He ruled in Simmern from 1509 to 1557, was humanistically and artistically trained, had the first printshop in the town built and promoted the arts, particularly sculpture. He also introduced the Reformation into his duchy, which led to tension with the neighbouring Archbishoprics of Trier and Mainz. He was followed by Friedrich III, called "the Pious", who converted to Calvinism in 1563 and played a leading role in Imperial politics. In 1559, the Palatinate-Simmern line succeeded the now extinct main line of the Palatinate in the Elector's capacity in Heidelberg. Friedrich III's brothers Georg and Reichard formed the short-lived line of the counts palatine of Simmern-Sponheim, whose holdings passed back to the Electorate under Friedrich IV on Reichard's death in 1598.

=== Wars in the Palatinate ===
Friedrich IV's son, Friedrich V was elected King of Bohemia – Bohemia was an elective monarchy – but soon ran afoul of the forces arrayed against him, notably the Catholic League and the Holy Roman Emperor himself, and not only was he forced to flee Bohemia in the face of these forces after only a year on the Bohemian throne (earning himself the derisive nickname "Winter King"), but he also saw to it that the Electorate of the Palatinate, too, was gripped in the throes of the Thirty Years' War. The Emperor also declared all Friedrich's holdings within the Holy Roman Emperor forfeit. His holdings in the Rhenish Palatinate were meanwhile once again partitioned with the founding of the younger line of Palatinate-Simmern by his brother Ludwig Philipp in 1611, though even this passed with Ludwig Philipp's son, Ludwig Heinrich's death in 1673 back to the main line under Karl I Ludwig, who won back the Electoral title in the Peace of Westphalia. Thanks to his fortifying the town, it came through the wars relatively unscathed. When Karl's son, Karl II died in 1685, though, there was further upheaval, for with him the Palatine line of the Wittelsbachs had died out, and France was now declaring rights of possession. Elizabeth Charlotte, Madame Palatine (known as Liselotte of the Palatinate), Karl II's sister, and in France's eyes the rightful heir, was married to Duke Philippe I, Duke of Orleans, King Louis XIV's brother. Since the Palatinate-Neuburg line of the Wittelsbachs also maintained a claim to the Simmern inheritance, the Nine Years' War (known in Germany as the Pfälzischer Erbfolgekrieg, or War of the Palatine Succession) broke out in 1688, during which the French laid waste to broad swathes of the Palatinate.

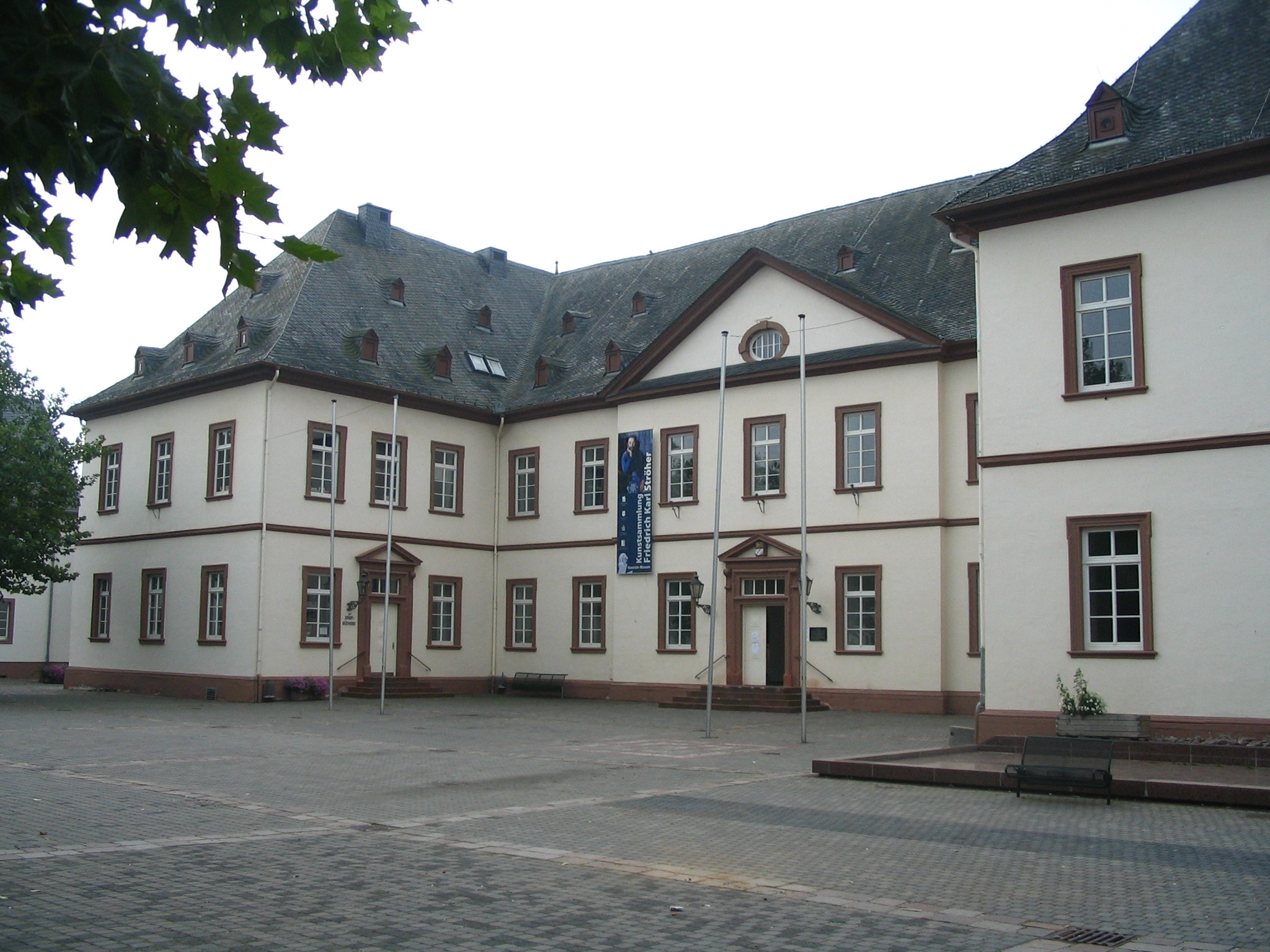
The New Schloss Simmern, built between 1708 and 1713 as the Palatine Oberamtmann's seat

By 1685, the Duchy of Simmern had passed to the Palatinate-Neuburg line. This noble house reintroduced the Catholic faith and called on the Boppard Carmelites to minister to the Catholics in the town of Simmern and the like-named Oberamt. With the family Schenk von Schmidtburg's help, the Carmelites founded a presence in town, and together with the Kreuznach Capuchins, took over pastoral duties in the Oberamt. They built Saint Joseph's Church. Not long before this, the town of Simmern itself had been flooded with a great many Huguenots who had fled religious persecution in France. On 17 September 1689, French troops overwhelmed the town, leaving almost all of it in rubble. The palatial residence was razed, just like the one in Heidelberg. All that was left standing after this catastrophe was Saint Stephen's Church, the Pulverturm ("Powder Tower", later to be known as the "Schinderhannes Tower") and a handful of houses. Nevertheless, the Wittelsbachs won out and remained the Palatinate's rulers under the terms of the Treaty of Ryswick. In the 18th century, however, Simmern was nothing more than the seat of a Palatine Oberamt, as the electors chose to keep their residence at Mannheim.

=== 18th to 20th century ===
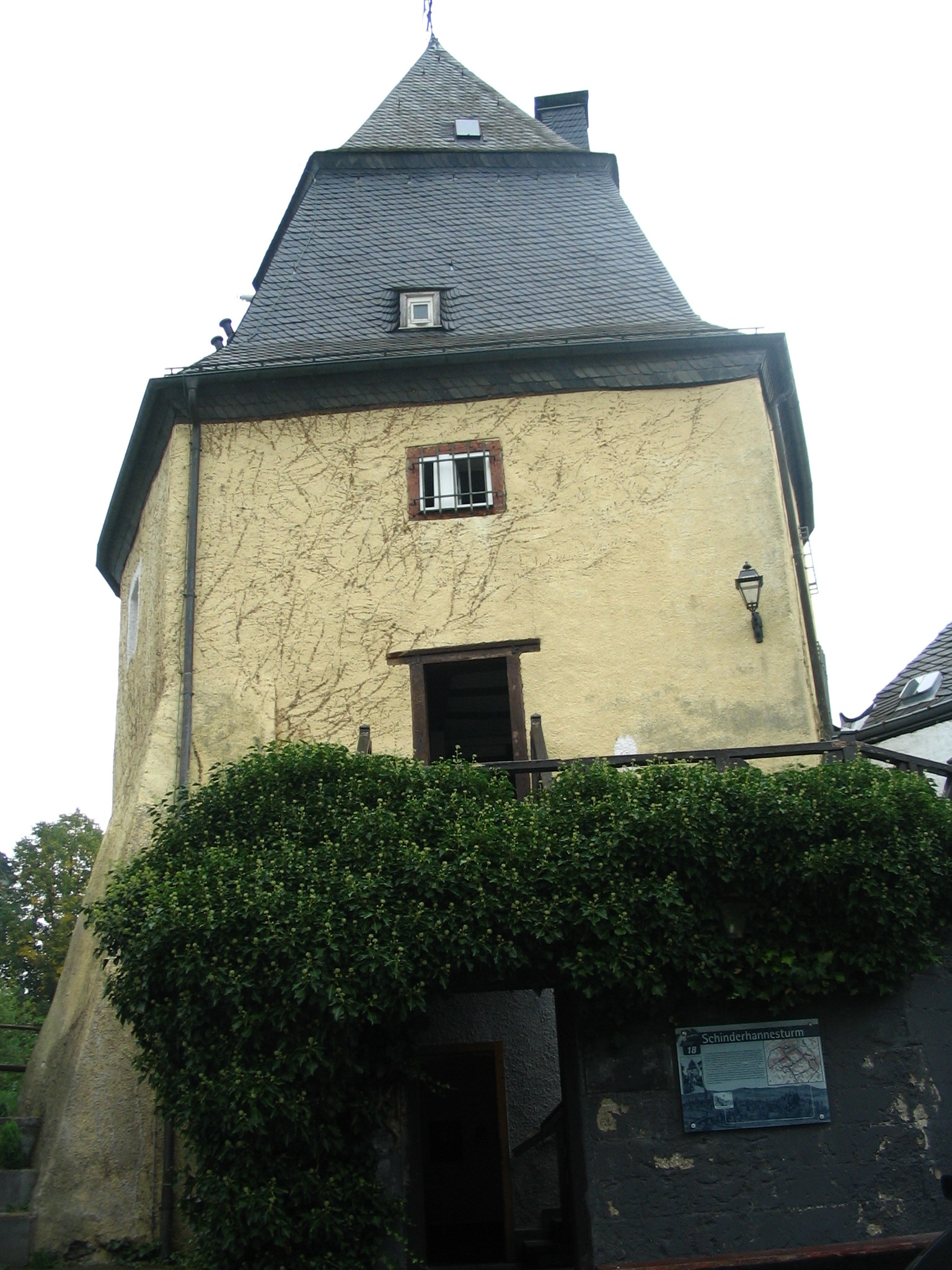
Town fortifications: Schinderhannesturm

After the French Revolution, the French once again conquered the Palatinate, which they annexed to their country along with the rest of the Rhine's left bank. Simmern became a canton in the Department of Rhin-et-Moselle. It was by the regular patrols of the newly founded National Gendarmerie that Johannes Bückler, later a well known robber and often called "Schinderhannes", was caught, although at this time he was nothing more than a small-time livestock thief in the Hunsrück and the northern Palatinate. In 1799 he spent half a year locked up in the tower that now bears his nickname, the Schinderhannesturm, in Simmern, from which he managed to escape. In 1804, Emperor Napoleon spent some time in the town, which in the meantime had acquired a municipal administration run according to French law. In 1815 Simmern was assigned to the Kingdom of Prussia at the Congress of Vienna.

The town's situation in the 19th century, outside the centers of industrialization, was not easy. In 1845 the potato blight caused bad harvests, driving many inhabitants to seek a better life in the New World.

In the First World War, Simmern was an important support base for troops marching to the Western Front. In Weimar times, when the town was also occupied once again by the French, Simmern suffered under the dire economic situation of the time. In the Second World War, there was yet more destruction. In March 1945, Simmern was occupied by American troops, but was later assigned along with the rest of the Palatinate to the French zone of occupation. Since 1946, Simmern has been part of the then newly founded state of Rhineland-Palatinate.

The town has borne the name element "Hunsrück" since 1 June 1980. On 15 April 1999, Simmern concluded a territorial swap with the municipality of Mutterschied, whereby several inhabitants found themselves living in a different municipality.

== Politics ==
=== Town council ===
The council is made up of 24 council members, who were elected by proportional representation at the municipal election held on 7 June 2009, and the honorary mayor as chairman.

The municipal election held on 7 June 2009 yielded the following results:

	SPD	CDU	FDP	GREENS	aSL	other	Total
2009	6	10	2	2	4	-	24 seats
2004	6	12	1	1	-	4	24 seats

=== Mayor ===
Simmern's mayor is Dr. Andreas Nikolay, and his deputies are Peter Mumbauer, Karl-Heinz Augustin and Michael Becker.

=== Coat of arms ===
The town's arms might be described thus: Per fess sable a lion passant Or armed, langued and crowned gules, and bendy lozengy argent and azure.

Simmern was held by the Raugraves until 1358, when it passed to the Counts Palatine of the House of Wittelsbach. Simmern was granted town rights in 1555. The arms are based on the town's oldest known seal, which dates from the late 14th century. The charge above the line of partition is the Palatine Lion, and the "bendy lozengy" pattern (that is, slanted diamonds) is the Wittelsbachs' armorial bearing. Otto Hupp's version of the town's arms, as seen in the Coffee Hag albums in the 1920s, was presented in a somewhat different style (but these differences are common among heraldic artists), and with one heraldic difference: the lion is missing his crown. The tinctures, however, are the same.

The arms have been borne since 1901.

=== Town partnerships ===
Simmern fosters partnerships with the following places:

- Migennes, Yonne, France
- Igrejinha, Rio Grande do Sul, Brazil
- Mänttä-Vilppula, Pirkanmaa, Finland
- Roeser, Canton of Esch-sur-Alzette, Luxembourg

== Culture and sightseeing ==
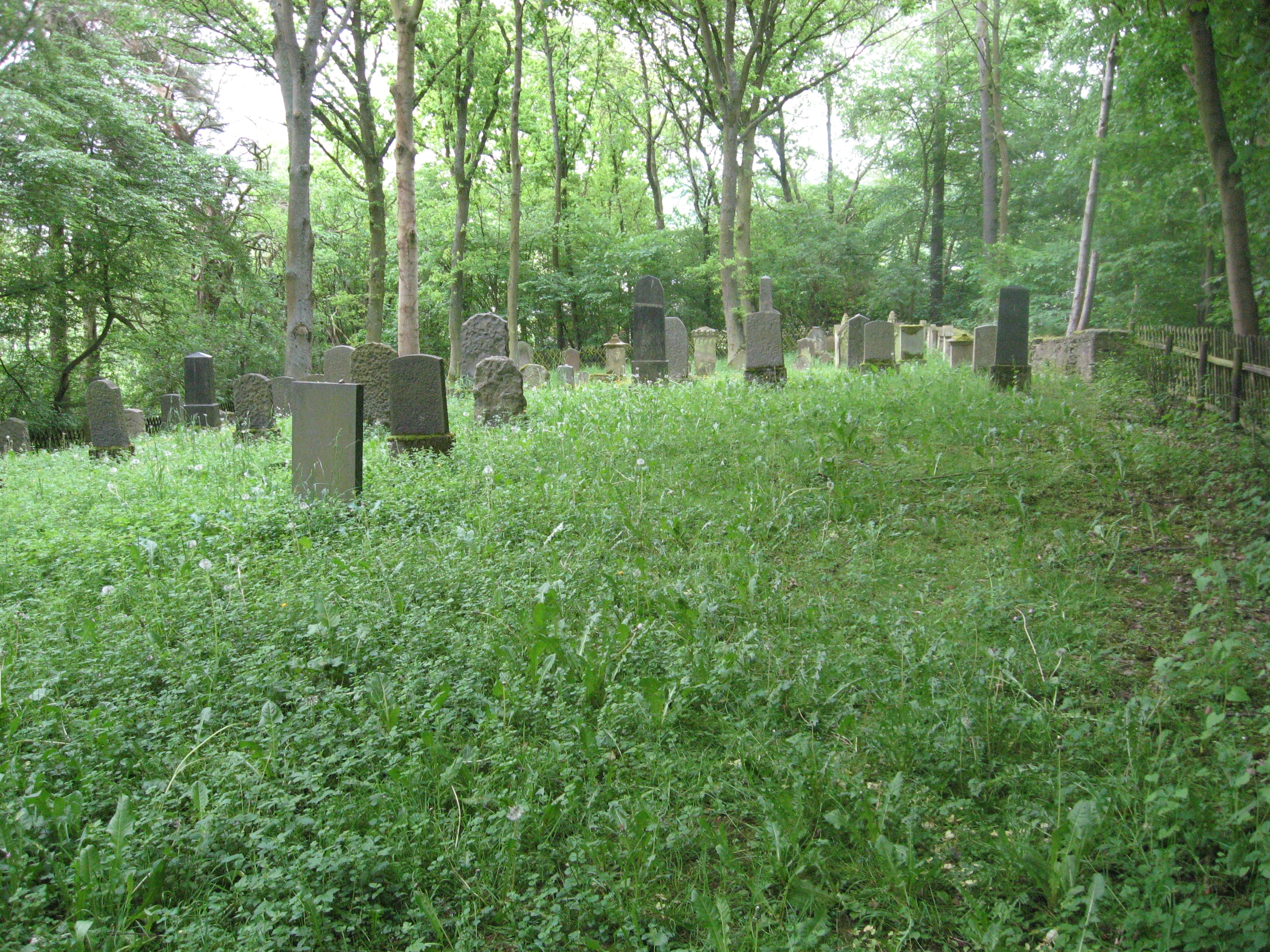
Jewish graveyard monumental zone

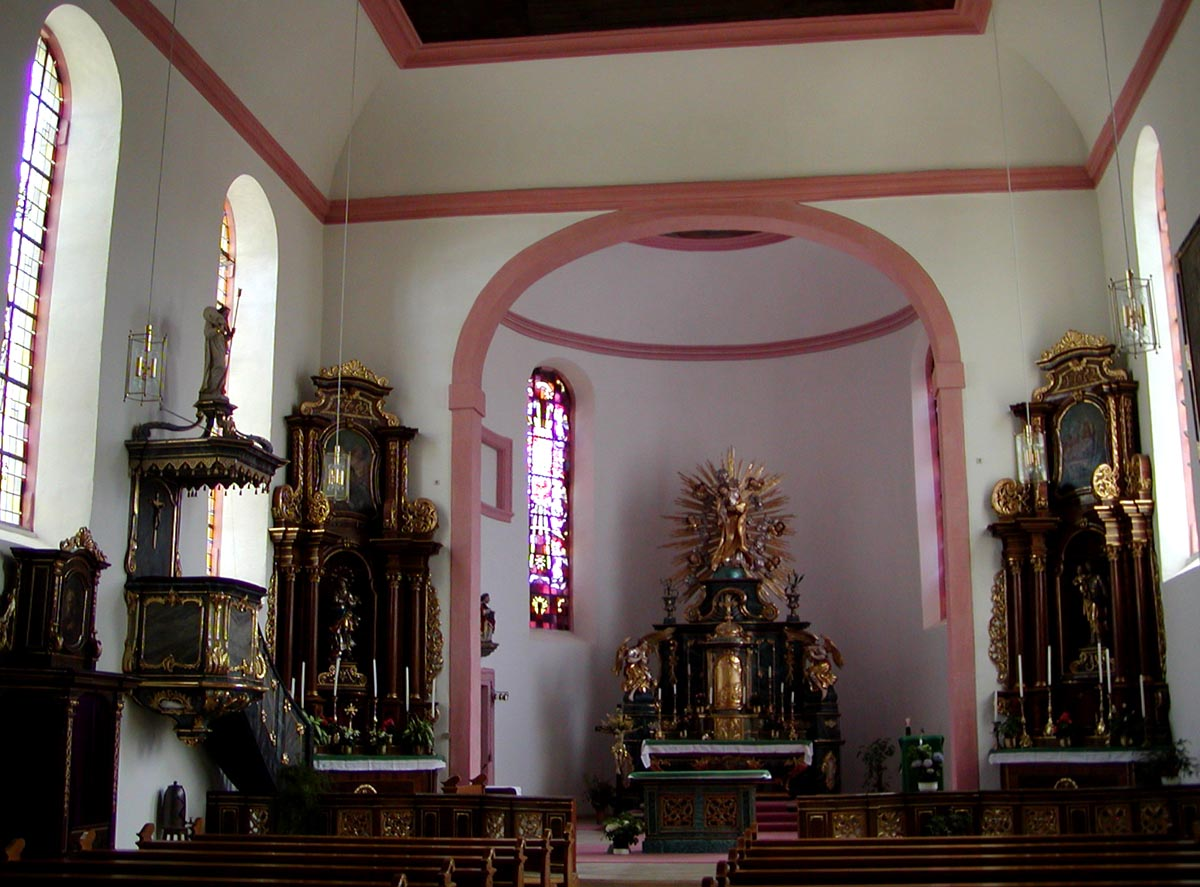
Klostergasse 3: Saint Joseph's Catholic Church (inside view)

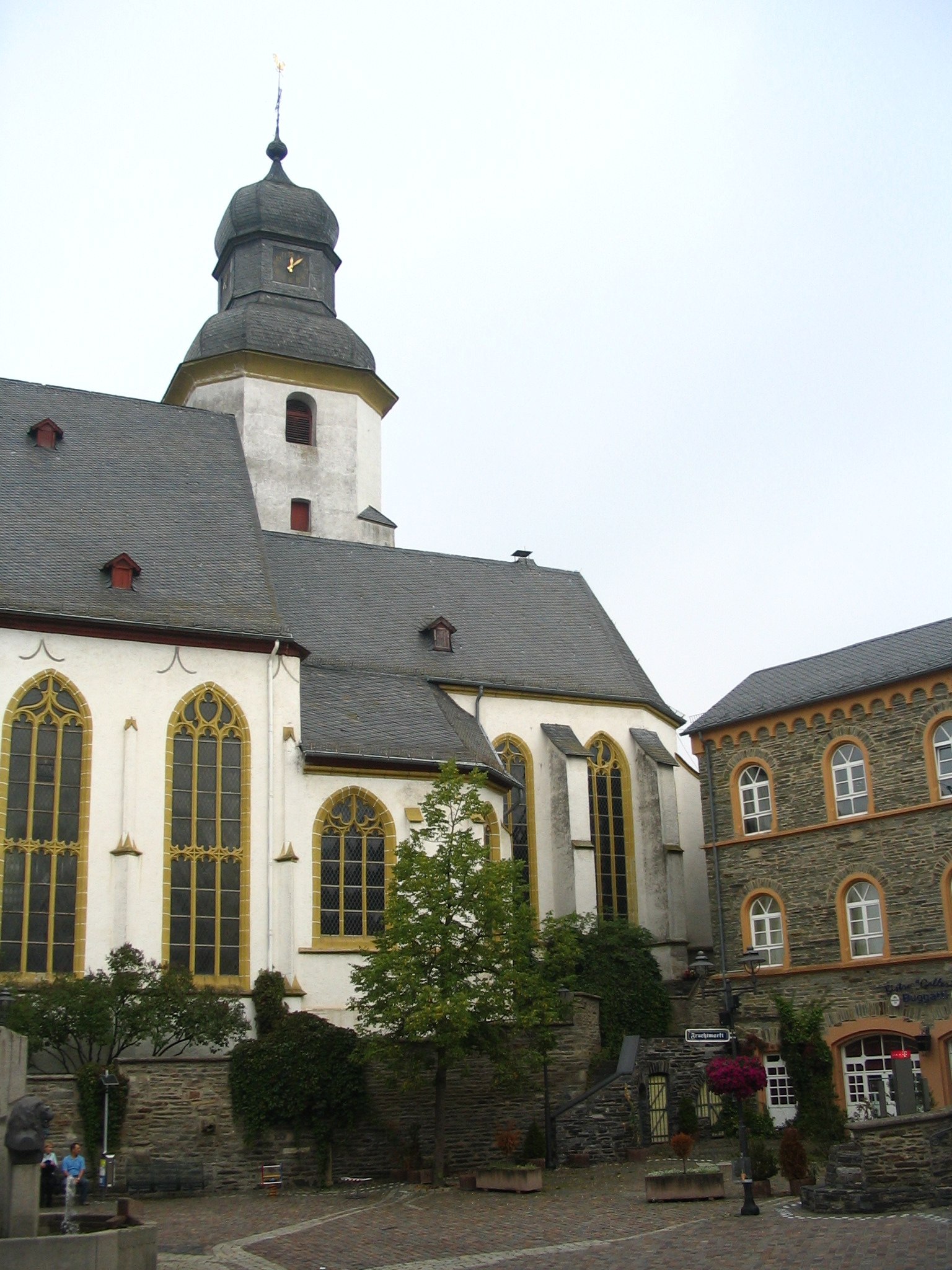
Römerberg 2: Saint Stephen's Evangelical Church

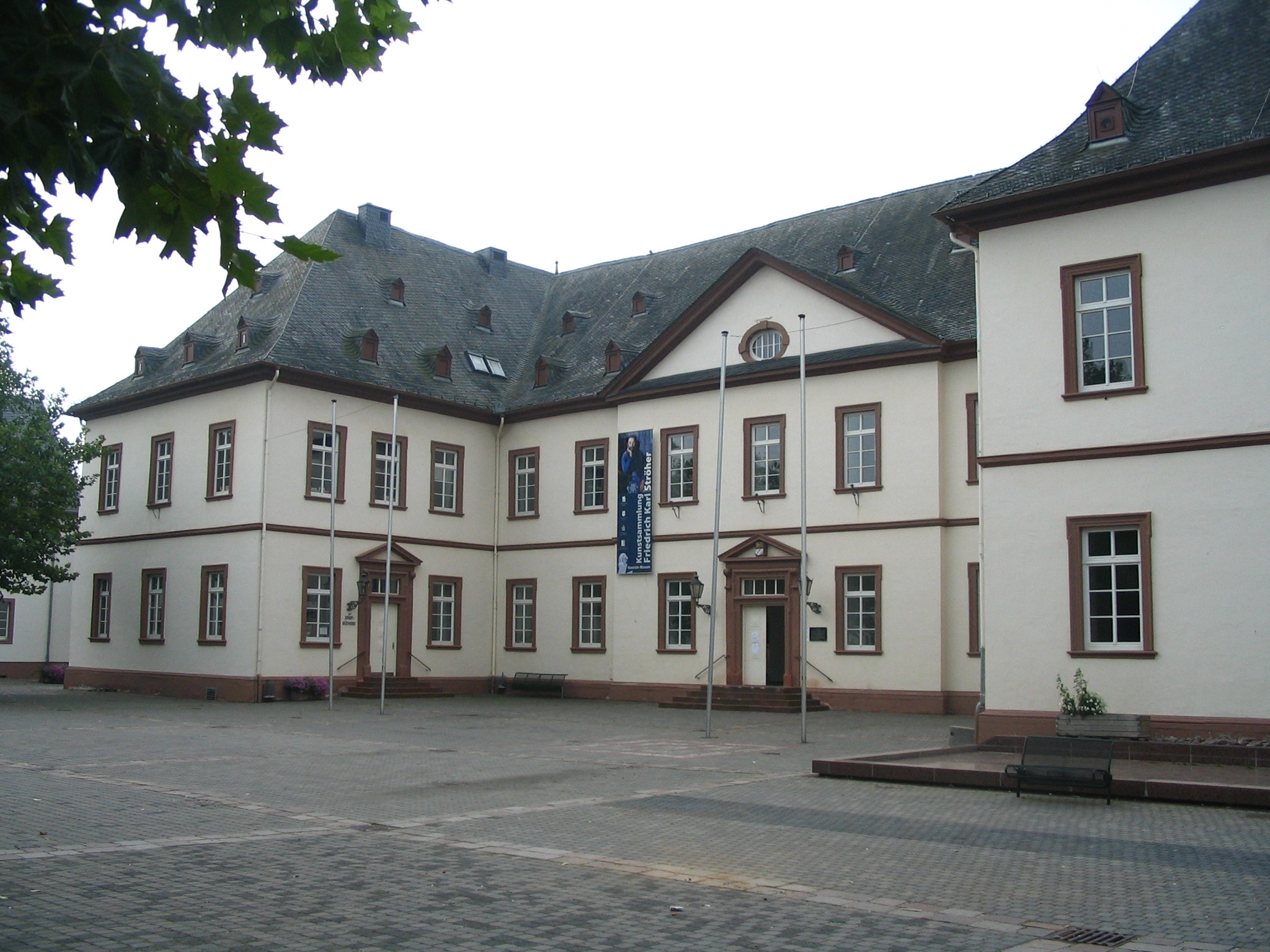
Schloßplatz: Schloss Simmern

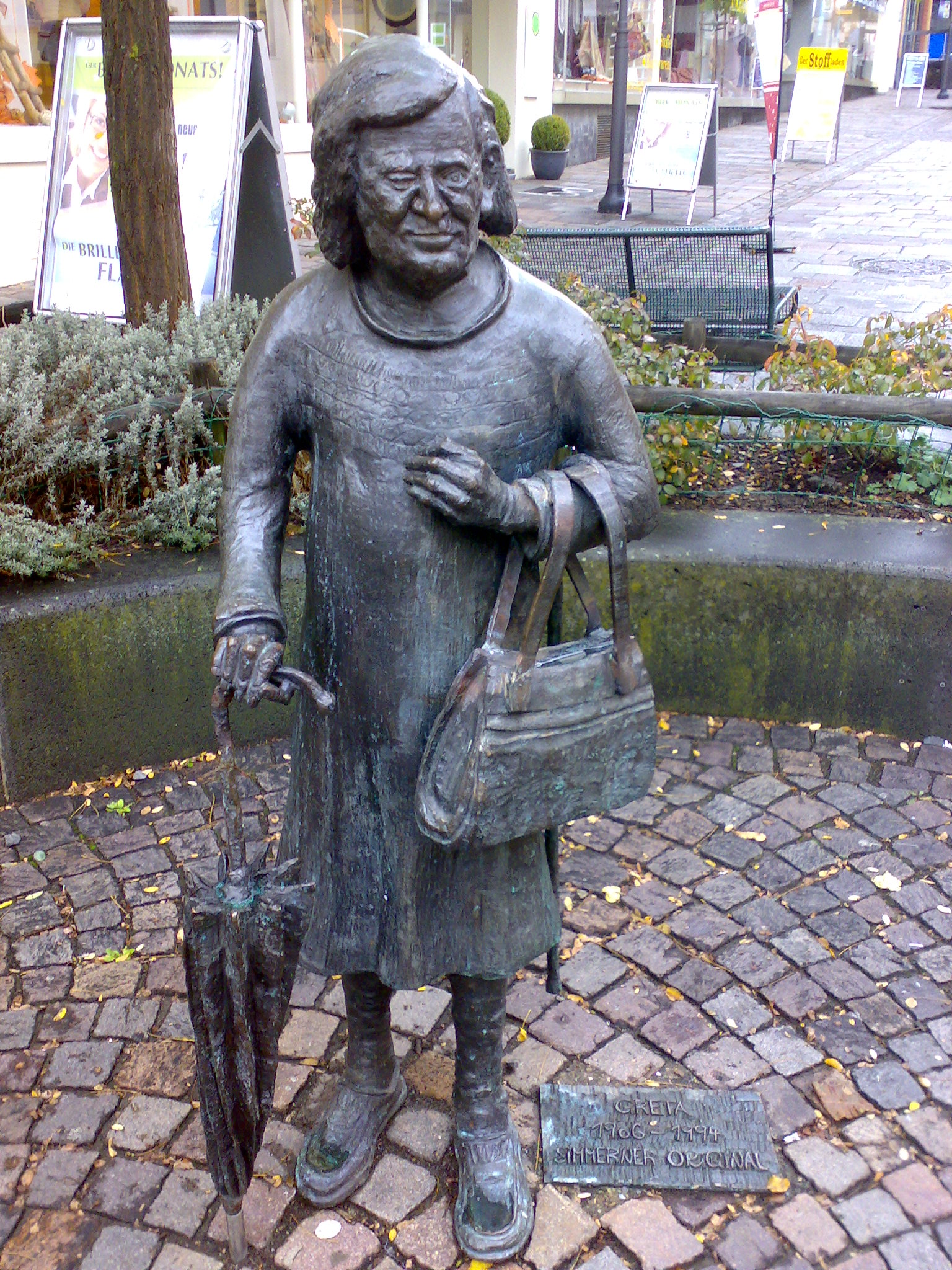
Cast of the original Simmern "Greta" in the pedestrial precinct

=== Buildings ===
The following are listed buildings or sites in Rhineland-Palatinate's Directory of Cultural Monuments:

- Saint Stephen's Evangelical Church (Kirche St. Stephan), Römerberg 2 – former palace church, Late Gothic hall church, 1486 to about 1509, tower raised in 1752 (see also below)
- Saint Joseph's Catholic Church (Kirche St. Joseph), Klostergasse 3 – aisleless church, 1749-1752 (see also below)
- Schloss Simmern, Schloßplatz – three-winged palatial complex around cour d'honneur, 1708-1713 (see also below)
- Town fortifications – remnants of the town fortifications destroyed in 1689, preserved Schinderhannesturm ("Schinderhannes Tower", Hüllstraße), mediaeval quarrystone building, 1750 new roof (see also below); Rundturm ("Round Tower", Mühlgasse), quarrystone
- Fruchtmarkt 2 – former school; Romanesque Revival quarrystone building, 1846, in emulation of Johann Claudius von Lassaulx
- Gerbereistraße – small tannery hut, 19th century
- Karl-Wagner Straße – substation tower, Swiss chalet style, about 1910/1920
- Kirchberger Straße 8 – Classicist plastered building, mid 19th century
- Klostergasse 4 – former Carmelite monastery (today a rectory); eight-axis plastered building, marked 1704; in the middle portal a statuette of Saint Joseph, ascribed to Burkhard Zamels
- Ludwigstraße 3/5 – Baroque Revival three-winged complex, hipped mansard roof, about 1910/1920
- Mühlengasse 19 – former Neumühle ("New Mill"); stately building with hipped mansard roof, partly timber-frame, sculpture, second fourth of the 18th century
- Oberstraße 13 – timber-frame house, partly solid, plastered or sided, historical setting into hillside, essentially from the 17th century
- Oberstraße 36 – Late Historicist brick building, marked 1902
- Oberstraße 38 – three-floor building with hipped roof, timber-frame, partly solid or slated, about 1700
- Oberstraße 40 – former Evangelical school; three-floor building with hipped mansard roof, timber-frame, partly solid or slated, 1689 to 1724
- Römerberg 4 – three-floor timber-frame house, partly slated, essentially possibly from the 17th century
- Römerberg 25 – timber-frame house, partly solid or slated, marked 1612, knee wall 19th century
- Römerberg 27 – timber-frame house, partly slated, early 17th century
- Vor dem Tor 2 – three-floor seven-axis building with mansard roof, timber-frame, partly solid, 1838
- Jewish graveyard (monumental zone) – founded before 1800, 115 grave steles from 1855 on
- warriors' memorial 1870/1871, in the forest south of Simmern – sandstone obelisk

=== More about buildings ===
Saint Joseph's Catholic Church, built in the 18th century, has ceiling frescoes worth seeing. For its part, Saint Stephen's Evangelical Church, built between 1486 and 1510, has tombs of the dukes of Palatinate-Simmern and an historical organ from 1776 built by the Hunsrück organ-building family Stumm.

The cultural centre at Schloss Simmern has its Hunsrückmuseum with an exhibit by Friedrich Karl Ströher (Hunsrück painter) and the town library. The new palace was built in 1708 as the Oberamtmann's administration building. It was here that the mediaeval castle once stood. This was expanded into a palatial residence in the latter half of the 15th century, but destroyed together with the rest of the town in 1689.

The so-called Schinderhannes‌turm, formerly the "Powder Tower", was used as a prison, and at different times held both Schinderhannes, the infamous robber, and Johann Peter Petri, his henchman, better known as Schwarzer Peter ("Black Peter"). Each eventually escaped.

The Restaurant Schwarzer Adler is notable as one of the few houses in town that was spared the razing that the rest of the town underwent at French hands in 1689. It stands with Saint Stephen's Church and the Schinderhannesturm as one of the town's oldest buildings.

=== Sport and leisure ===
Simmern has an indoor swimming pool and an outdoor "nature" pool, a youth café, a skating park and a cinema.

Beginning on the town's western outskirts is the Schinderhannes-Radweg (cycle path), running from there through the Külztal (Külzbach valley) by way of Kastellaun to Emmelshausen. To the south runs the Schinderhannes-Soonwald-Radweg (another cycle path), which links Simmern with the Soonwald.

In 2007 and 2008, the town staged the Schinderhannesfestspiele (theatrical plays) for the first time. The first production was Der Ausbruch ("The Breakout"), a play about Schinderhannes's daring escape from the town's "Powder Tower" (now called the "Schinderhannes Tower") in August 1799. The Powder Tower had been said to be escape-proof. In 2010, the Schinderhannesfestspiele were staged for the third time. This time, the production was the musical Julchen.

Simmern's sport clubs are VfR Simmern and BGV Simmern. VfR Simmern is well known for its football team, SG Soonwald/Simmern (a coöperative effort with clubs in the surrounding area), table tennis (regional league) and its handball team, HSG Kastellaun/Simmern (a coöperative effort with TV Kastellaun 09). Furthermore, VfR also offers basketball, swimming, badminton and other sports. TC Sportpark Simmern is the town's tennis club.

== Economy and infrastructure ==
=== Transport ===
The four-lane Bundesstraße 50 runs by south of town. Simmern has a railway station, which currently serves only as a bus station. The station was once a transfer station along the Hunsrückquerbahn between Bingen and Hermeskeil. The railway is currently in disuse, but plans are being made to reactivate a portion of it (including the section in Simmern) in order to connect Frankfurt-Hahn Airport with the Frankfurt Rhine Main Region. A former spur between Simmern and Kastellaun has been re-purposed as a dedicated bicycle path, the Schinderhannes-Radweg.

The reopening of Frankfurt-Hahn Airport (20 km away) for commercial aviation and the widening of Bundesstrasse B-50 to four lanes have given the district and the town even greater economic potential for the future. Future plans include a possible extension of the Autobahn A 60 to facilitate traffic from the Frankfurt metropolitan area to Simmern and the Benelux countries. The town is roughly 10 kilometres from the Autobahn A 61.

=== Economy ===
Slate mining and agriculture have been the traditional industries of the district, but recent growth in the optical, pharmaceutical and biochemical industries has transformed the local economy.

Among the town's biggest employers are the following: ZF Boge Elastmetall (roughly 600 employees), CompAir (compressed air and gas systems, roughly 500 employees), the firm Pfefferkorn (Sekt stopper maker), Deutsche Fertighaus Holding (prefabricated buildings), SchwörerHaus KG (works for finishing "Kastell"-brand solid-construction houses, basements, ceilings and prefabricated concrete articles), Zischka Textilpflege (laundry service), the Hunsrück-Klinik and DHL, with a logistical centre. Besides these, there are several discount stores and many smaller service-sector businesses. Over the last few years, Simmern has grown into a regional hub for the automotive trade. Simmern has grown tremendously in the last twenty years as more people and new industries have relocated to the area.

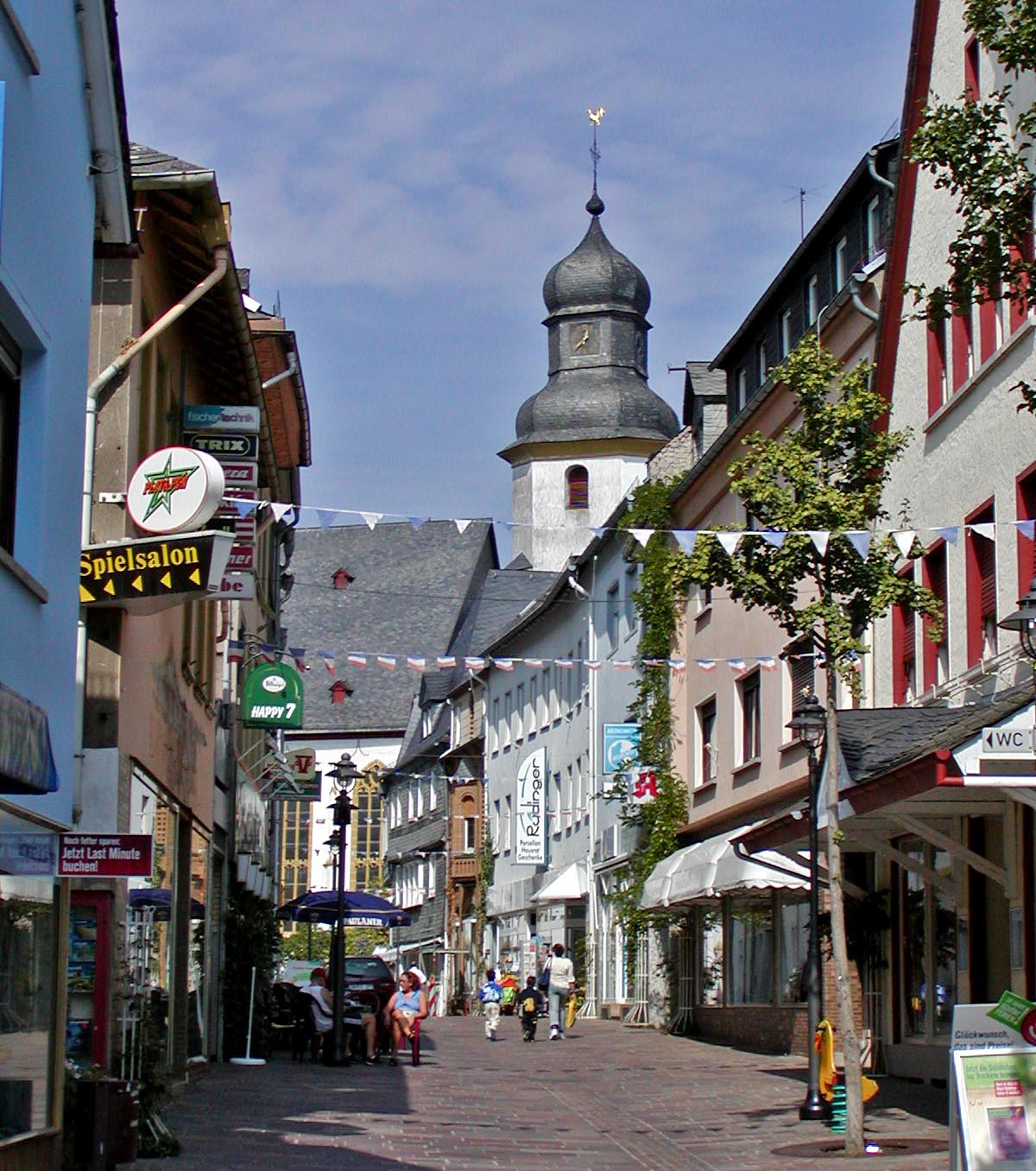
Oberstraße shopping street

=== Other business activity ===
There is also a cinema, the "Pro-Winz-Kino". The business association, Simmern attraktiv e. V., is a union of the town's business owners, who have, for instance, set themselves the goal of strengthening the town as a retail centre and making it more attractive to citizens, shoppers and visitors.

=== Education ===
Simmern has two primary schools, the Kurt-Schöllhammer-Grundschule and the Rottmannschule. It also has a regional school for Hauptschule and Realschule certificates, the state mathematical-natural sciences Herzog-Johann-Gymnasium, the professional training school with an economics Gymnasium, several vocational schools and upper vocational schools and the Hunsrückschule für Lernbehinderte (for learners with learning difficulties). The folk high school is charged with providing adult education.

=== Public institutions ===
Besides the town and district administrations, a number of other public entities can be found in Simmern (Amtsgericht, financial, forestry, health and cadastral office, police, branch office of the Koblenz chamber of commerce, district craftsmen's association). The town is also the location of a "technology and founders' centre" (Technologie- und Gründerzentrum, the "founders" being entrepreneurs who found businesses).

== Famous people ==
=== Sons and daughters of the town ===
- Friedrich III (1515–1576), Elector Palatine
- Peter Joseph Rottmann (1799–1881), Hunsrück dialectal poet
- Eugen Eppstein (1878–1943 at Majdanek concentration camp), politician and Member of the Reichstag
- Bernhard Hermkes (1903–1995), architect and urban planner
- Rudolf Zischka (1928– ), recipient of the Bundesverdienstkreuz
- Michael Linden (1948– ), neurologist and psychotherapist
- Dan Zerfaß (1968– ), church musician
- Benjamin Sohns (1982– ), Electro musician
- Patrick Schmidt (1988– ), footballer

=== Famous people associated with the town ===
- Johannes Bückler (1779–1803), robber, called Schinderhannes, spent just under half a year in 1799 in the Simmern town prison
- Johann Peter Petri (1752–1812), robber, called Schwarzer Peter or Der alte Schwarzpeter, Johannes Bückler's henchman
- The Reverend Julius Reuß (1814–1883), cofounder of the Schmiedelanstalten ("Wetland Institutes", homes that care for those with various handicaps) in 1849
- Richard Oertel (1860–1932), Evangelical theologian and politician
- Wolfgang Rumpf (1936–2006), forester and politician (FDP), headed the Simmern forestry office from 1971 to 1981
- Günter Felke (1929–2005), entrepreneur and cultural promoter, beginning in 1994 bearer of the shield of honour and beginning in 2000 honorary citizen of the town of Simmern
- Edgar Reitz (1932– ), film director, made parts of the film Die Reise nach Wien in Simmern as well as some scenes of Heimat – Eine deutsche Chronik and Heimat 3 – Chronik einer Zeitenwende (both parts of the Heimat trilogy). Edgar Reitz has been an honorary citizen of the town since 2002.
- Gudrun Landgrebe (1950– ), actress
- Dorothee Oberlinger (1969– ), recorder player, grew up in Simmern
- Felix Antoine Blume (1984– ), rapper/musician, grew up in Simmern

== Sources ==
- Diarium residentiae Carmelitarum im Hunsrück-Museum Simmern.
