= Frederick I, Count Palatine of Simmern =

Count Palatine of Simmern (1459-1480)

Frederick I
- Count Palatine of Simmern
- Coat of arms of Frederick I, Count Palatine of Simmern
- Born: 19 November 1417
- Died: 29 November 1480 (aged 63); Simmern
- Buried: Abbey of Ravengiersburg
- Noble family: Wittelsbach
- Spouse: Margaret of Guelders
- Issue Detail: John I; Rupert
- Father: Stephen, Count Palatine of Simmern-Zweibrücken
- Mother: Anna of Veldenz

Frederick I, the Hunsrücker (German: Friedrich I.; 19 November 1417 – 29 November 1480) was the Count Palatine of Simmern from 1459 until 1480.

== Biography ==
Born on 19 November 1417, Frederick was the son of Stephen, Count Palatine of Simmern-Zweibrücken and his wife, Anna of Veldenz, both members of the House of Wittelsbach. In 1444 his father partitioned his territories between Frederick and his younger brother Louis I, Count Palatine of Zweibrücken.

== Marriage and children ==
Frederick married on 16 August 1454 Margaret, daughter of Arnold, Duke of Guelders. They had:

1. Katherine of Palatinate-Simmern (1455 – 28 December 1522), Abbess in the St Klara monastery in Trier
2. Stephen (25 February 1457 – 1488/9) Canon in Strasbourg, Mainz and Cologne
3. William (2 January 1458 – 1458)
4. John I (15 May 1459 – 27 January 1509)
5. Frederick (10 April 1460 – 22 November 1518) Canon in Cologne, Speyer, Trier, Mainz, Magdeburg and Strasbourg
6. Rupert (16 October 1461 – 19 April 1507), bishop of Regensburg.
7. Anne (30 July 1465 – 15 July 1517) Nun in Trier
8. Margaret (2 December 1466 – August 1506) Nun in Trier
9. Helene (1467 – 21 February 1555) Prioress in the St. Agnes monastery in Trier
10. William (20 April 1468 – 1481) Canon in Trier

== Death ==
Frederick died in Simmern in 1480 and was buried in the Augustinian Abbey of Ravengiersburg.

Regnal titles
Preceded by Friedrich III	Count at Sponheim; 1444 – 1480	Succeeded by John I
Preceded by Stephen	Count Palatine of Simmern; 1459 – 1480	Succeeded by John I
