= Gustav, Duke of Zweibrücken =

German noble (1670–1731)

Gustav Samuel Leopold
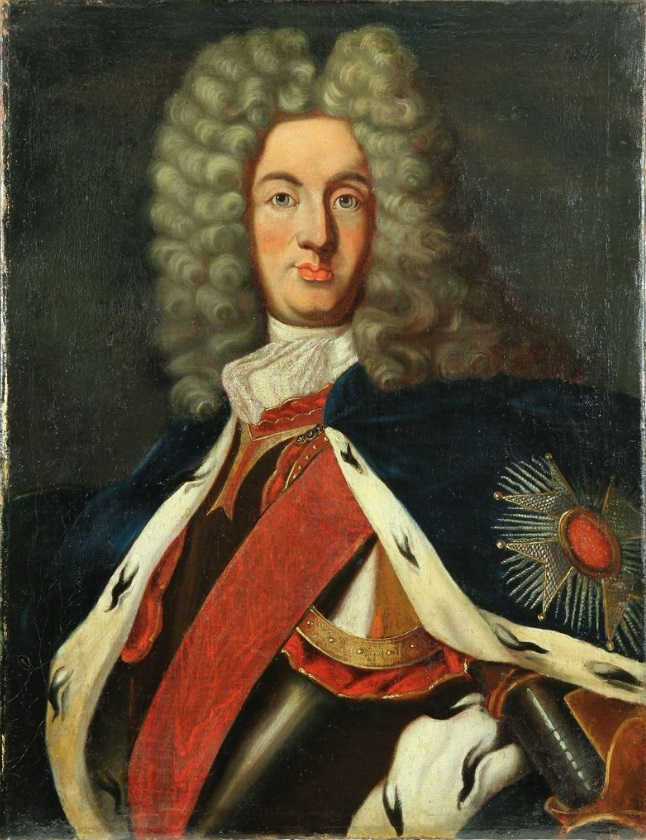
- Count Palatine Gustav

Count Palatine of Kleeburg
- Reign: 1701–1731
- Predecessor: Adolph John II
- Successor: Christian III of Birkenfeld

Duke of Zweibrücken
- Reign: 1718–1731
- Predecessor: Charles XII of Sweden
- Successor: Christian III of Birkenfeld
- Born: 12 April 1670; Stegeborg Castle near Söderköping, Sweden
- Died: 17 September 1731 (aged 61); Zweibrücken, Germany
- Spouse: Dorothea of Palatine-Veldenz; Louise Dorothea von Hoffmann
- Father: Adolph John I, Count Palatine of Kleeburg
- Mother: Elsa Elisabeth Brahe
- Religion: Lutheran

Gustav Samuel Leopold (12 April 1670 – 17 September 1731) was the Count Palatine of Kleeburg from 1701 until 1731 and the Duke of Zweibrücken from 1718 until 1731.

He was the last reigning male member of the Kleeburg line of the House of Wittelsbach.

== Title ==
Gustav Samuel Leopold's title read as follows:

Gustav Samuel Leopold, by the Grace of God, Count Palatine of the Rhine, Duke in Bavaria, of Jülich, Cleves and Berg, Prince of Moers, Count of Veldenz, Sponheim, Mark, Ravensberg and Rixingen, as well as Lord of Ravenstein

== Life ==
Gustavus Samuel Leopold was born at Stegeborg Castle near Söderköping in 1670 as the youngest son of Adolph John I, Count Palatine of Kleeburg. The siblings were reportedly badly treated by their parents, and in 1687, Gustav helped his sisters Catherine and Maria Elizabeth to escape from their parents to the protection of the Swedish royal court, which became a scandal in contemporary Sweden.

He succeeded his brother Adolph John II as Count Palatine of Kleeburg in 1701, and his cousin Charles XII, King of Sweden, as Duke of Zweibrücken in 1718. The king's death also made him one of the eligible candidates for the Swedish throne. From 1720 until 1725 he moved his residence to a palace, Zweibrücken Castle, built by Jonas Erikson Sundahl.

Gustavus Samuel Leopold died in Zweibrücken in 1731 and was buried in the Alexanderkirche. As the last male member of his branch of the House of Wittelsbach, his territories were inherited by Christian III, Count Palatine of Zweibrücken-Birkenfeld.

He competed for the Grand Mastery of the Sacred Military Constantinian Order of Saint George, whose obscure magisterial dynasty was going extinct in the late 17th century, and whose grand mastership had been transferred to Francesco Farnese, Duke of Parma in 1696. In the annals of that chivalric institution and of the Vatican, Gustav is referred as a Duke of Bavaria. Gustav failed in his aspirations, and the grand-mastership was confirmed in 1701 by the pope to be hereditary in the House of Farnese and its successors (the Dukes of Castro). The Farnese duke was later succeeded in the position by his nearest male kinsman, the future king Charles III of Spain.

Duke Gustav had the baroque Residenz of Zweibrücken constructed in the 1720s, the Swede Jonas Eriksson Sundahl being the builder.

In Swedish politics, Duke Gustav was the last male of the line of his paternal grandmother, Katarina Vasa. Upon the death of his cousin King Charles XII, Gustav of Stegeborg then became one of the eligible candidates for legitimate succession to the thrones of Sweden and of the grand duchy of Finland. He would have become king Gustav III, had he succeeded. However, no strong faction or party in Sweden took up his cause, and his succession rights are not much remembered by history. Instead, his cousin Ulrica Eleonora managed to become the Swedish queen regnant.

Duke Gustav died during the reign of Frederick I of Sweden. His Swedish rights were inherited either by his nephew Charles Adolf Gyllenstierna, count of Ericsberg, or his sister, Countess Palatine Marie Elisabeth of Kleeburg, or their cousin, Charles Frederick, Duke of Holstein-Gottorp.

== Marriage ==
On 10 July 1707, Gustav married Countess Palatine Dorothea (1658–1723), daughter of Leopold Louis, Count Palatine of Veldenz. The marriage remained childless.

On 13 May 1723, he morganatically married Louise Dorothea von Hoffmann (30 March 1700 – 14 April 1745) at Zweibrücken, a daughter of Johan Heinrich von Hoffman by his wife, Anne Chocq. She converted to Catholicism in 1723 and was raised by the Holy Roman Emperor on 3 March 1724 to the title Countess von Hoffmann. They also had no children.

== Ancestors ==
Ancestors of Gustav, Duke of Zweibrücken

8. John I, Count Palatine of Zweibrücken
4. John Casimir, Count Palatine of Kleeburg
9. Magdalene of Jülich-Cleves-Berg
2. Adolph John I, Count Palatine of Kleeburg
10. Charles IX of Sweden
5. Catherine of Sweden
11. Maria of the Palatinate-Simmern
1. Gustav, Duke of Zweibrücken
12. Abraham Pedersson Brahe
6. Count Nils Abrahamsson Brahe af Visingsborg
13. Baroness Elsa Nilsdotter Gyllenstierna
3. Countess Else Elisabeth Brahe af Visingsborg
14. Baron Svante Turesson Bielke
7. Baroness Anna Margareta Bielke
15. Grevinna Elisabet Lewenhaupt

== Sources ==
- Arthur Kleinschmidt (1879). "Gustav Samuel Leopold" . Allgemeine Deutsche Biographie (in German). Vol. 10. Leipzig: Duncker & Humblot. pp. 188–189.
- Herman Hofberg et al. (eds) (1906) (in Swedish). "Gustaf Samuel Leopold, hertig till Pfalz-Zweibrücken", Svenskt biografiskt handlexikon I:416.
- Alessandro Cont, La Chiesa dei principi. Le relazioni tra Reichskirche, dinastie sovrane tedesche e stati italiani (1688-1763), preface of Elisabeth Garms-Cornides, Trento, Provincia autonoma di Trento, 2018, pp. 144-145, https://www.academia.edu/38170694/La_Chiesa_dei_principi._Le_relazioni_tra_Reichskirche_dinastie_sovrane_tedesche_e_stati_italiani_1688-1763_prefazione_di_Elisabeth_Garms-Cornides_Trento_Provincia_autonoma_di_Trento_2018

Gustav, Duke of Zweibrücken House of Wittelsbach Born: 12 April 1670 Died: 17 September 1731
Preceded by Adolph John II	Count Palatine of Kleeburg; 1701–1731	Succeeded by Christian III of Zweibrücken-Birkenfeld
Preceded by Charles XII of Sweden	Duke of Zweibrücken; 1718–1731	Succeeded by Christian III of Zweibrücken-Birkenfeld
