= House of Palatinate-Zweibrücken =

Branch of the Wittelsbach dynasty

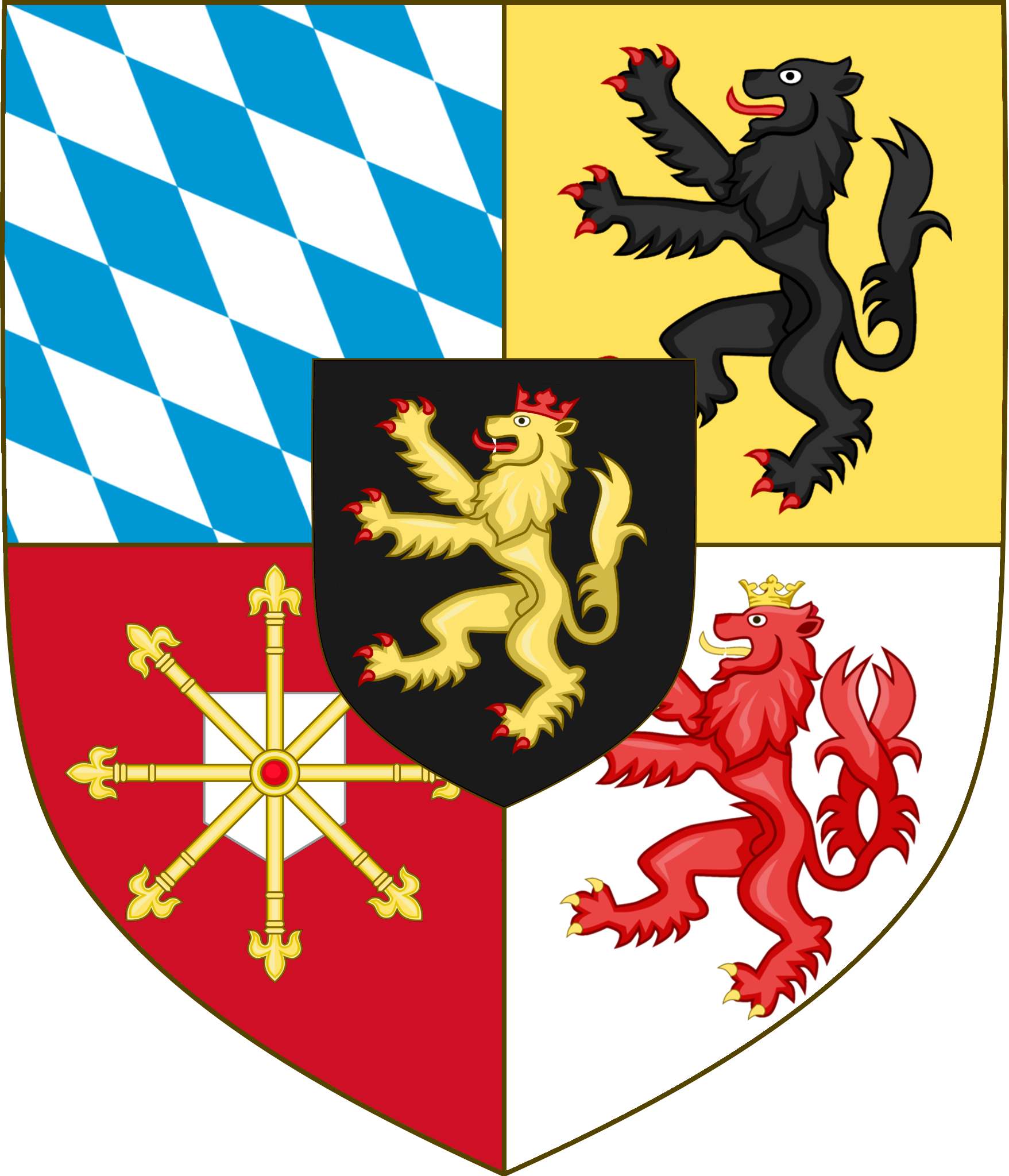
Arms of Palatinate-Zweibrücken

Greater coat of arms of Palatinate-Zweibrücken

The House of Palatinate-Zweibrücken (German: Haus Pfalz-Zweibrücken; also known in Sweden as the Palatine dynasty, Swedish: Pfalziska ätten) was a branch of the House of Wittelsbach. Its Palatinate-Zweibrücken-Kleeburg branch was the ruling dynasty of Sweden from 1654 to 1720.

Their reign in Sweden coincided with the Caroline era (karolinska tiden), a period characterized by royal absolutism and the military prowess of the Caroleans under Kings Charles XI and Charles XII, during which the Swedish Empire reached both its height and its ultimate decline in the Great Northern War.

== History ==
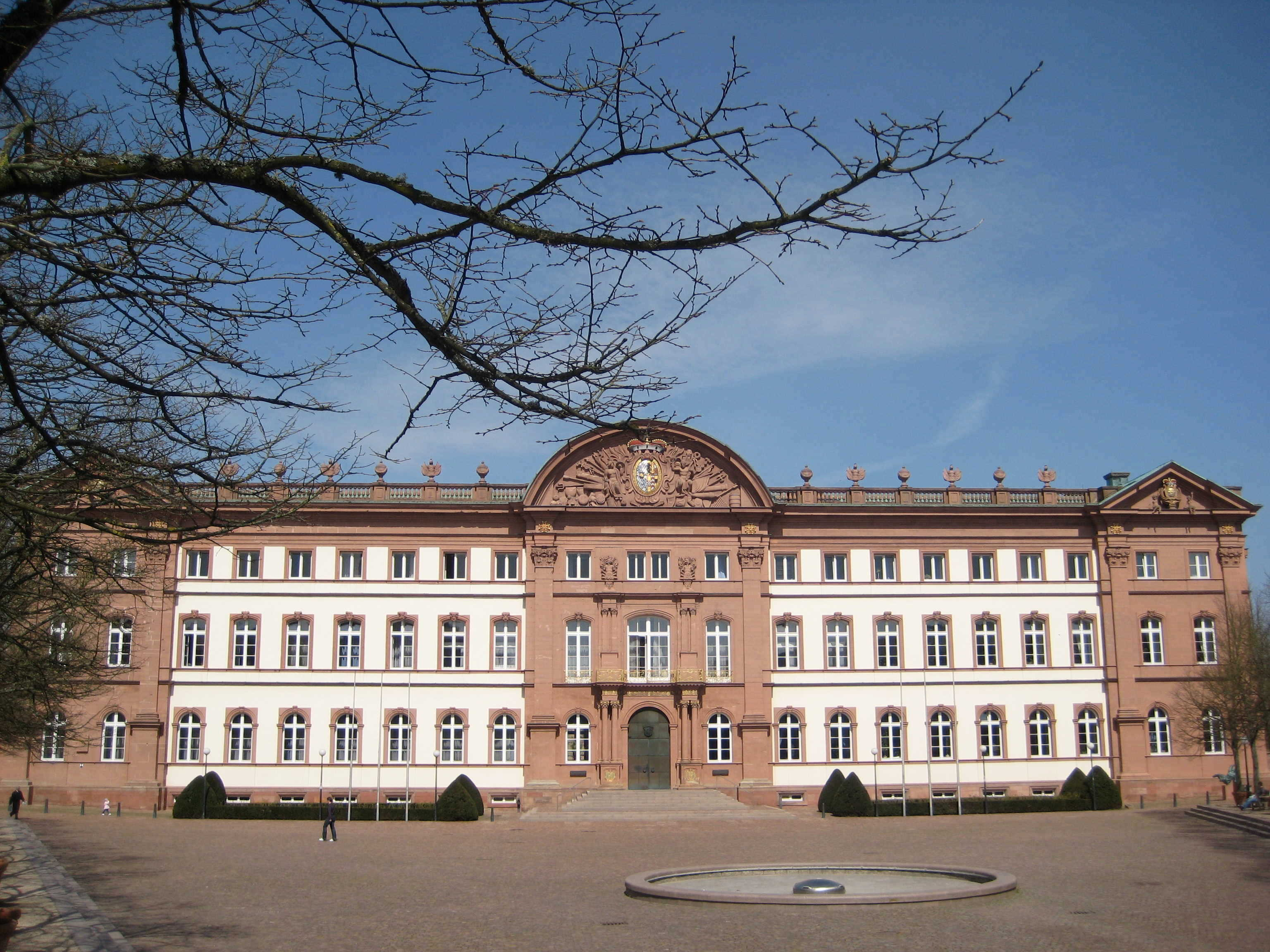
Zweibrücken Castle

The Swedish royal line of the house originated with John Casimir, Count Palatine of Kleeburg, who first travelled to Sweden in 1613 as an envoy seeking closer ties between the Protestant Union and Sweden. He married Catherine of Sweden, Countess Palatine of Kleeburg, the half-sister of King Gustavus Adolphus of Sweden, in 1615, but returned to the Palatinate in 1618. After fleeing the Thirty Years' War to Strasbourg in 1620, John Casimir and his family were summoned to Sweden by Gustavus Adolphus in 1622. They settled at Stegeborg Castle, where John Casimir remained until his death in 1652. Their son, Charles X Gustav of Sweden, succeeded Queen Christina of Sweden in 1654, establishing the Palatine dynasty on the Swedish throne.

The house originated with Stephen, Count Palatine of Simmern-Zweibrücken (1385–1459), a son of King Rupert of Germany. His descendants divided into several branches, including Palatinate-Zweibrücken-Kleeburg. In 1615, John Casimir, Count Palatine of Kleeburg, married Catherine of Sweden, a daughter of King Charles IX of Sweden, establishing a close dynastic connection with the Swedish royal house.

Their son Charles X Gustav succeeded his cousin Queen Christina following her abdication in 1654, beginning the rule of the Palatinate dynasty in Sweden. He was succeeded by his son Charles XI, his grandson Charles XII, and finally his granddaughter Ulrika Eleonora. In 1720, Ulrika Eleonora relinquished the throne in favour of her husband, Frederick I of Hesse, ending the rule of the Palatinate dynasty in Sweden. Although the house ceased to reign in Sweden in 1720, its descendants continued through female lines and became connected with several later European royal families, including the House of Bernadotte.

== Family tree ==
House of Wittelsbach
Rupert; King of Germany (1352–1410) m. Elisabeth of Nuremberg
Rupert (1375–1397)	Frederick (1377–1401)	Louis III; Elector Palatine (1378–1436)	John; Count Palatine of Neumarkt (1383–1443) m. Catherine of Pomerania	Stephen; Count Palatine of Simmern-Zweibrücken (1385–1459) m. Anna of Veldenz	Otto; Count Palatine of Mosbach (1390–1461)
Electors Palatine	Christopher; King of Sweden, Denmark and Norway (1416–1448)	Frederick the Hunsrücker (1417–1480)	Rupert; Bishop of Strasbourg (1420–1478)	Stephen (1421–1485)	Louis the Black (1424–1489) m. Johanna de Cröy	John; Archbishop of Magdeburg (1429–1475)	Counts of Mosbach-Neumarkt
Counts of Simmern	Kaspar; Count Palatine of Zweibrücken (1458–1527)	Alexander the Lame (1462–1514) m. Margaret of Hohenlohe-Neuenstein
Louis the Younger (1502–1532) m. Elisabeth of Hesse	Rupert; Count Palatine of Veldenz (1506–1544)
Wolfgang; Count Palatine of Zweibrücken (1526–1569) m. Anna of Hesse	Counts of Veldenz
Philip Louis; Count Palatine of Neuburg (1547–1614)	John the Lame (1550–1604) m. Magdalene of Jülich-Cleves-Berg	Otto Henry; Count Palatine of Sulzbach (1556–1604)	Frederick; Count Palatine of Zweibrücken-Vohenstrauss-Parkstein (1557–1597)	Charles; Count Palatine of Zweibrücken-Birkenfeld (1560–1600)
Counts of Neuburg	John the Younger (1584–1635)	Frederick Casimir; Count Palatine of Zweibrücken-Landsberg (1585–1645)	John Casimir; Count Palatine of Kleeburg (1589–1652) m. Catherine of Sweden	Counts of Zweibrücken-Birkenfeld
Dukes of Zweibrücken	Frederick Louis; Count Palatine of Zweibrücken (1619–1681)	Charles X Gustav; King of Sweden (1622–1660) m. Hedwig Eleonora of Holstein-Gottorp	Adolf John; Count Palatine of Kleeburg (1629–1689)
Charles XI; King of Sweden (1655–1697) m. Ulrika Eleonora of Denmark	Counts of Kleeburg
Charles XII; King of Sweden (1682–1718)	Ulrika Eleonora; Queen of Sweden (1688–1741) m. Frederick I of Sweden

== Cadet branches ==
Cadet branches include:

- House of Palatinate-Kleeburg
- House of Palatinate-Veldenz
- House of Palatinate-Neuburg
- House of Palatinate-Sulzbach
- House of Palatinate-Birkenfeld
- House of Carlson (illegitimate branch)

== See also ==
- List of Counts Palatine of Zweibrücken

Royal House House of Palatinate-Zweibrücken Cadet branch of the House of Wittelsbach
Preceded by House of Vasa	Ruling house of the Kingdom of Sweden; 1654–1720	Succeeded by House of Hesse
