= Elsa Elisabeth Brahe =

Swedish countess and duchess (1632–1689)

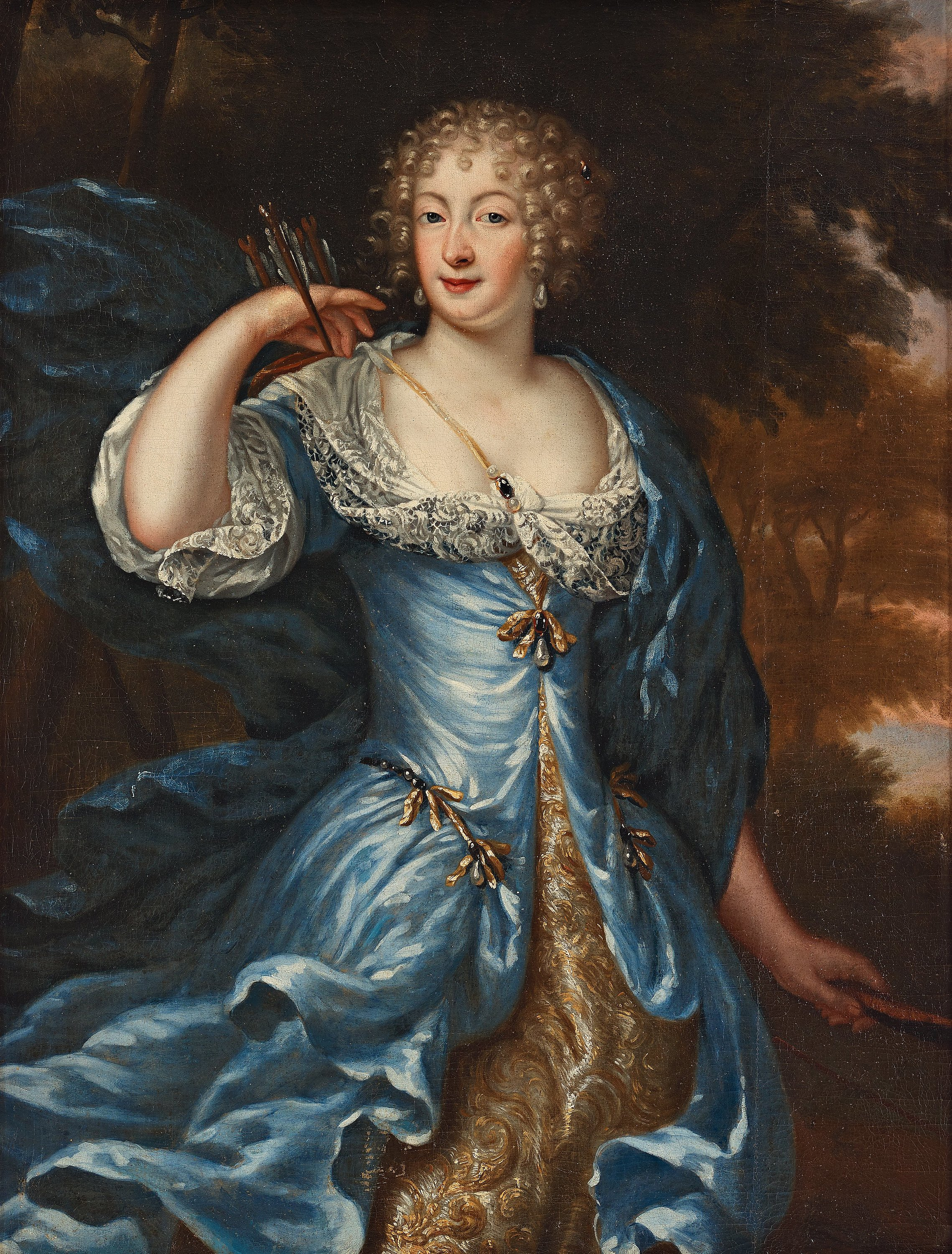
- Elsa Elisabeth Brahe as the goddess Diana
- Born: 29 January 1632
- Died: 24 February 1689 (aged 57)
- Spouse(s): Erik Axelsson Oxenstierna (m. 1648–1656; his death); Adolph John I, Count Palatine of Kleeburg (m. 1661–1689; her death)
- Children: 11
- Parent(s): Nils Brahe; Anna Margareta Bielke

Elsa Elisabeth Brahe (29 January 1632 – 24 February 1689) was a Swedish countess and duchess who married Adolph John I, Count Palatine of Kleeburg, Duke of Stegeborg, the brother of king Charles X Gustav of Sweden.

== Life ==
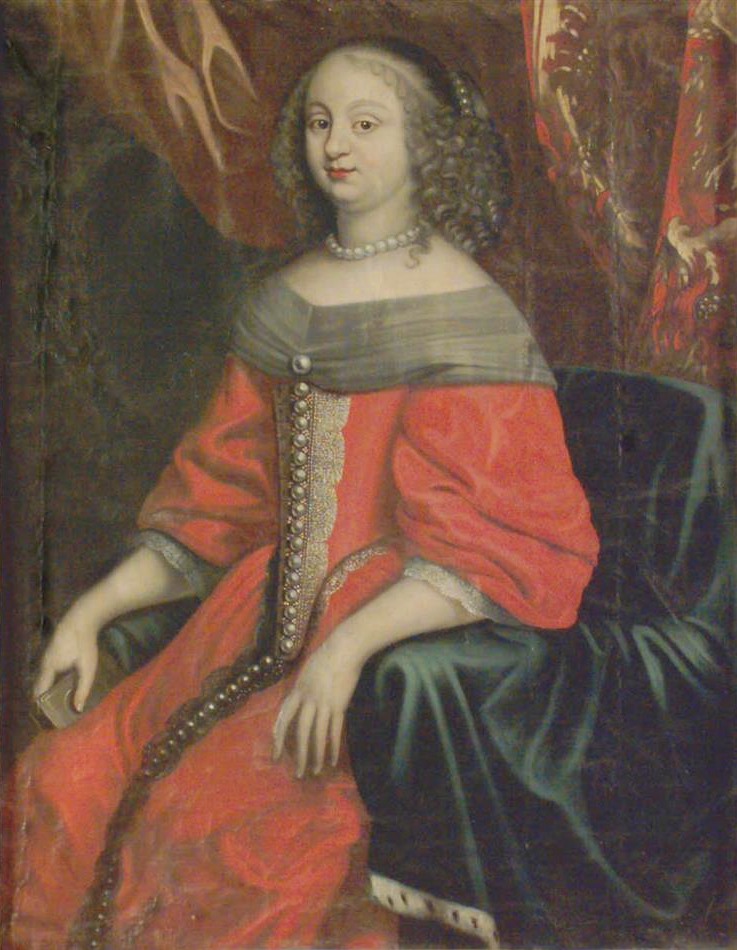
Elsa Elisabeth around 1670

She was the daughter of count Nils Brahe and Anna Margareta Bielke (1603-1643). She was the sister of Nils Brahe the younger.

She married firstly to Count Erik Axelsson Oxenstierna, Lord High Chancellor of Sweden in 1654-1656, and the son of Axel Oxenstierna. The marriage took place in 1648. This marriage was said to have been arranged partially to eradicate the potentially difficult that could otherwise disturb the power balance among the noble fractions at court caused by the highly controversial love match between her relative Margareta Brahe and her brother-in-law Johan Oxenstierna. Elsa Elisabeth was constantly pregnant during her first marriage, giving birth to five children in just five years; she was widowed in 1656.

In 1661, she married secondly Adolph John I, Count Palatine of Kleeburg, Duke of Stegeborg, the paternal uncle of king Charles XI of Sweden. He was the childless widower of her cousin, Elsa Beata Brahe, daughter of her uncle Per Brahe the Younger.

The marriage was politically motivated. Adolph John wished to establish support by her connections in the Swedish nobility for his ambition to participate in the regency government of Charles XI. After the regent, Hedvig Eleonora of Holstein-Gottorp, advised him against a dynastic marriage with Holstein-Gottorp, he proposed to Elsa Elisabeth after the Riksdag of 1660, reportedly against the will of the regent and others, who tried to convince Elsa Elisabeth to decline the match.

At the Swedish court, Elsa Elisabeth already became involved in a dispute of rank with her sister-in-law, Countess Palatine Maria Eufrosyne of Zweibrücken, in the year of her marriage. Märta Allertz acted as a mediator in this dispute without success. When the matter was resolved by the regent in favor of Maria Eufrosyne, who had been born a princess rather than in favor of Elsa Elisabeth, who was only a princess by marriage, Adolph John and Elsa Elisabeth withdrew from court and settled in Stegeborg Castle. Elsa Elisabeth was also constantly pregnant during her second marriage, giving birth to nine more children in just 10 years, although only four of them survived early childhood.

At Stegeborg, the ducal couple held a grand representational court life in order to secure support among the nobility for Adolph John's political ambition. However, the attempts were not successful. Adolph John I was regarded with suspicion by the nobility, and as a person described as proud, dominant and obsessed by rank, and while his first consort was described as a more mild character, Elsa Elisabeth was described as his equal in character and personality. After the great reduction of Charles XI in 1682-86, the ducal couple was no longer able to host a representational social life in accordance with their rank, and reacted by isolating themselves entirely from the outside world. They were said to have abused their children. This became the object of a formal investigation in 1686, and culminated in a scandal with to attempts of their children to escape from parental authority in 1687 and 1688, the last of the attempts successful.

== Issue ==
From her first marriage with Count Erik Axelsson Oxenstierna:

1. Christina Eriksdotter Oxenstierna (1651 – 1711), married count Gabriel Oxenstierna af Croneborg.
2. Axel Eriksson Oxenstierna (1652 – 1676), rector illustris at Uppsala University.
3. Lisbeta Eriksdotter Oxenstierna (1653 – 1653), died in infancy.
4. Elisabet Eriksdotter Oxenstierna (1654 – 1721), married Gustaf Adolf De la Gardie.
5. Carl Gustaf Eriksson Oxenstierna (1655 – 1686), minister.

From her second marriage with Adolph John I, Count Palatine of Kleeburg:

1. Catherine of Pfalz-Zweibrücken (10 December 1661 – 27 May 1720).
2. Maria Elizabeth Louise of Pfalz-Zweibrücken (16 April 1663 – 23 January 1748).
3. Charles John of Pfalz-Zweibrücken (15 September 1664 – 10 December 1664), died in infancy.
4. John Casimir of Pfalz-Zweibrücken (4 September 1665 – 29 May 1666), died in infancy.
5. Adolph John II, Count Palatine of Kleeburg (21 August 1666 – 27 April 1701).
6. Gustavus Casimir of Pfalz-Zweibrücken (29 June 1667 – 21 August 1669), died in childhood.
7. Christina Magdalena of Pfalz-Zweibrücken (4 April 1669 – 21 June 1670), died in childhood.
8. Gustavus Samuel Leopold, Count Palatine of Kleeburg and Zweibrücken (12 April 1670 – 17 September 1731).
9. Unnamed child (born and died 12 December 1671).

== Sources ==
- Berättelser ur svenska historien / 13. Konung Karl den elftes förmyndare. Afd. 1
- Nanna Lundh-Eriksson (1947). Hedvig Eleonora. Stockholm: Wahlström & Widstrand. ISBN
- Johan Christopher Barfod, Wilhelm Odelberg: Dagens märkvärdigheter, Volym 2. Natur & Kultur, 1967
