= Catherine of Pfalz-Zweibrücken (1661–1720) =

Catherine of Pfalz-Zweibrücken (10 December 1661 – 27 May 1720), was the daughter of Adolph John I, Count Palatine of Kleeburg and Countess Elsa Elisabeth Brahe of Wisingsborg, cousin of Charles XI of Sweden and the sister of Adolph John II, Count Palatine of Kleeburg and Gustav, Duke of Zweibrücken. She is foremost known for the scandal involving herself and her siblings, when she, after a long ongoing conflict in 1686-88, escaped from the authority of her parents.

== Parental conflict ==
Catherine was born and raised in Sweden, were her father resided at Stegeborg Castle as the Duke of Stegeborg, being the brother of King Charles X Gustav of Sweden. She was the sibling of Maria Elizabeth of Pfalz-Zweibrücken and Adolph John II, Count Palatine of Kleeburg and Gustav, Duke of Zweibrücken.

Her father, Adolph John I, resided permanently in exile from the Swedish royal court at Stegeborg Castle, after his unsuccessful career and the great reduction of Charles XI had left the family in poor financial circumstances. Their parents were described as bitter toward the royal house, and reportedly channelized their frustration in their behavior toward their children, who they treated worse enough to attract dislike even by the standard of the day. Because their economical situation prevented them from participating in social life in accordance with their rank, and their father was too proud to ask for financial assistance, their parents kept their children at Stegeborg Castle and isolated them not only from the royal court life and aristocratic society, but even from family members, prevented them from seeing anyone from outside the Castle and used them for domestic chores. Catherine and Maria Elizabeth, in contrast to their parents, were described as humble and obliging rather than proud nor pompous, and as "quite beautiful and lovely girls".

In 1686, the two sons applied for a position at court, but when they did not succeed, their father prevented them from leaving the Castle again. The same year, the sisters sent a letter to their half sister of their mothers previous marriage, countess Christina Oxenstierna af Croneborg and asked her for help. Christina asked Queen Hedvig Eleonora for help, who suggested that the father of the sisters asked for them to be made courtiers: Christina explained that the abuse at Stegeborg were already scandalously well known, and that she had not been able to see her mother since her remarriage. Christina's sister Elisabet De la Gardie sent money to Catherine. The 3 March 1687, the Duke had Catherine write a letter on behalf of herself and her sister in which she stated that she had no complaints and denied that she had ever asked anyone for help. Her father also sent back the money and demanded to know by which reason and condition his daughters had been given money against his consent.

== Scandal ==
The 1 November 1687, the two sisters and their younger brother Gustav ran away from home with the assistance of the clerk Matthias Rigneer and the footman Petter. The party was apprehended by the servants of their father, the siblings returned and their helpers imprisoned. This became a scandal, and when the Duke accused the judges for freeing those who helped his adult children escape his parental authority. This led to the governor of Östergötland, Erik Lovisin, conducting an investigation, in which he confirmed that the children were exposed to abuse. After the report, Charles XI offered to finance a trip abroad for the male siblings and give the female ones positions at court, but the Duke declined all efforts to violate his parental authority. In July 1688, the three siblings ran away a second time, and although the servants of their father caught up with them, they allowed them to proceed to the royal court in Stockholm despite their orders to stop them. There, they were given the protection of Queen Hedvig Eleonora, who made the sisters her ladies-in-waiting. The father sent their mother to court to claim them back, but she was forced to return without them.

In 1689, she and her sister reconciled with their parents and nursed them at their deathbeds, after which Stegeborg Castle was confiscated by the crown. The two sisters the resided at Bråborg Castle supported by the same allowance previously given to their father.

== Later life ==
In 1710, Catherine married the Swedish count Kristofer Gyllenstierna. He had previously proposed during the lifetime of her parents, but was denied by them as being of inferior rank. He now repeated his proposal after having been made riksråd, and was this time accepted by Catherine herself. Shortly after, she regretted giving her consent and eloped to her sister at the Protestant Herford Abbey. Gyllenstierna, however, followed her there, and persuaded her to go through with the marriage, which she did. Reportedly, they had a happy marriage until her death. In 1719, it is mentioned how Catherine was present in the city of Norrköping when it was attacked and sacked by the Russians during the Russian Pillage of 1719-1721, and was forced to flee in haste a carriage pulled by oxen.
