= Gustav Adolf of Sweden =

Gustav Adolf of Sweden – English (and Latin) also: Gustavus Adolphus; Swedish: Gustav Adolf and (legal spelling after 1900): Gustaf Adolf – may refer to:

- Gustavus Adolphus (Gustav II Adolf, 1594–1632), King of Sweden 1611–1632
- Gustav IV Adolf (1778–1837), King of Sweden 1792–1809
- Gustaf VI Adolf (Gustav VI Adolf, 1882–1973), King of Sweden 1950–1973
- Gustav Adolf, Prince of Sweden de facto 1652, son of Prince Adolph John I, Count Palatine of Kleeburg (died in infancy)
- Prince Gustaf Adolf, Duke of Västerbotten (1906–1947), Prince of Sweden
