= Palatine Zweibrücken =

Historical territory in present-day Rhineland-Palatinate, Germany

Coordinates: 49°15′N 7°22′E

Duchy of Palatinate-Zweibrücken Herzogtum Pfalz-Zweibrücken (German) Duché de Palatinat-Zweibrücken (French)
- 1459–1801
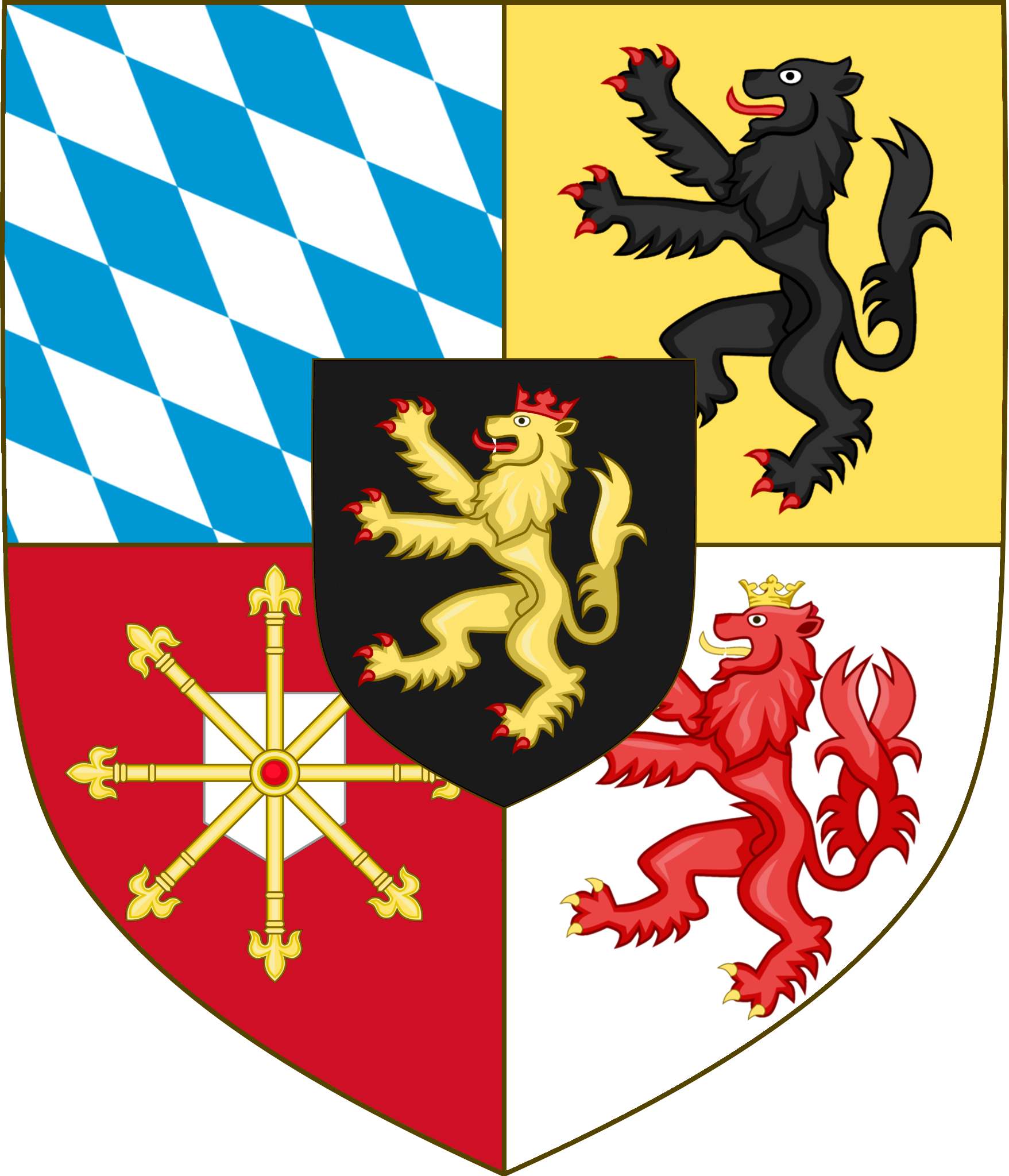
- Arms of the Duke of Palatinate-Zweibrücken

- Palatine Zweibrücken (green) and other Palatine lines, ca. 1700.
- Status: Duchy
- Capital: Zweibrücken
- Common languages: German
- Religion: Roman Catholicism; Lutheranism, from 1532; Calvinism, from 1588
- Duke
- Historical era: Middle Ages/Early modern period
  - Split from Palatinate-Simmern and Zweibrücken, unified with County Palatine of Veldenz: 1459
  - Annexed by France: 1801
Preceded by	Succeeded by
Palatinate-Simmern and Zweibrücken; County Palatine of Veldenz	French First Republic

The Duchy of Palatinate-Zweibrücken (German: Herzogtum Pfalz-Zweibrücken; French: Duché de Palatinat-Deux-Ponts or Comté palatin de Deux-Ponts) was a duchy of the Holy Roman Empire with full voting rights to the Reichstag. Its capital was Zweibrücken. The reigning house, a branch of the Wittelsbach dynasty, was also the Royal House of Sweden from 1654 to 1720.

== Overview ==
Palatine Zweibrücken was established as a separate principality in 1459, when Stephen, Count Palatine of Simmern-Zweibrücken divided his territory, Palatinate-Simmern and Zweibrücken, between his two sons. The younger son, Louis I, received the County of Zweibrücken and the County of Veldenz.

Palatine Zweibrücken ceased to exist in 1797 when it was annexed by France. After the Congress of Vienna in 1815, some parts of it were returned to the last Duke, King Maximilian I Joseph of Bavaria, who joined them with other former territories on the left bank of the Rhine to form the Rheinkreis, later the Rhenish Palatinate.

== Origins ==
The County Palatine of Simmern-Zweibrücken had been created in 1410 for Stephen, the third surviving son of prince-elector King Rupert. In 1444, Stephen inherited the County of Veldenz from his father-in-law, Frederick III, Count of Veldenz. In 1444, Stephen decided to divide his possessions between his sons, Frederick I and Louis I. When Stephen abdicated in 1453, the elder son Frederick I received the County of Sponheim and the northern half of the County Palatine of Simmern-Zweibrücken. The younger son, Louis I, received the County of Veldenz from his grandfather's inheritance and the southern half of Palatinate-Zweibrücken-Simmern, which included the former County of Zweibrücken, acquired by the Palatinate in 1385. Among Stephen's titles were Count Palatine of the Rhine and Duke in Bavaria. Both sons inherited the right to use these titles, which is why the two newly formed principalities of Palatine-Simmern and Palatine-Zweibrücken were usually described as Counties Palatine.

== Extent ==
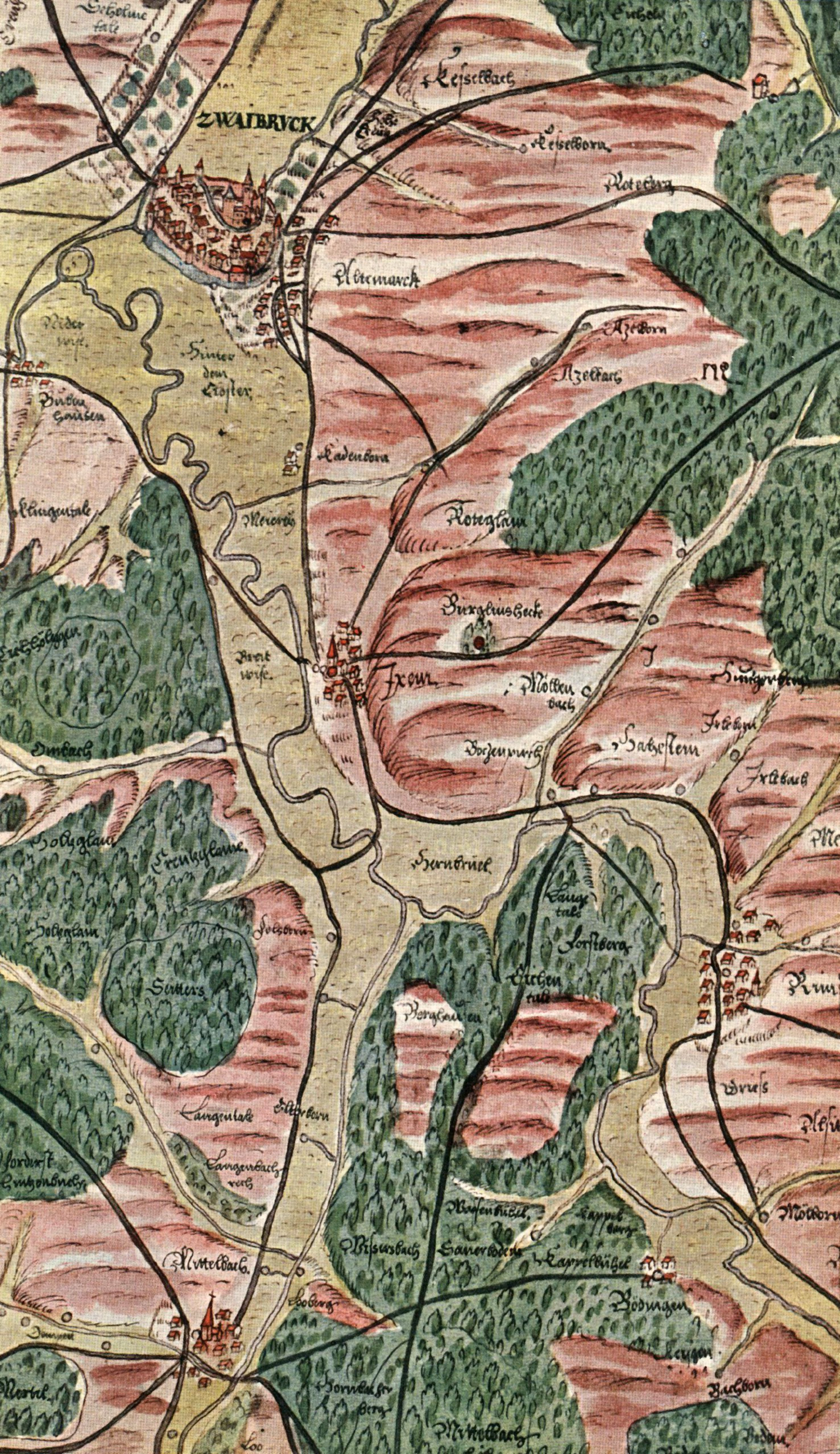
Zweibruecken on a map from 1564 by Tilemann Stella

When Palatine Zweibrücken was created in 1444, it consisted of the districts of Armsheim, Landsberg, Lauterecken, Burg Lichtenberg, Meisenheim and Veldenz from the County of Veldenz. In 1459, the districts Falkenburg Castle, Guttenberg, Haßloch, Kirkel, Lambsheim, Oggersheim, Wachenheim, Wegelnburg and Zweibrücken from Palatine Simmern were added.

=== Territories held in 1784 ===
An Amt was an administrative district; an Oberamt was a larger district, subdivided into Unterämter.

- Oberamt Zweibrücken
- Oberamt Homburg (acquired in 1755 in a territorial exchange with Nassau-Saarbrücken)
- Oberamt Lichtenberg at Kusel (originally part of the County of Veldenz)
- Oberamt Meisenheim (originally part of the County of Veldenz)
- Oberamt Trarbach, including Kröv (originally part of the County of Sponheim)
- Amt Allenbach (originally part of the County of Sponheim)
- Oberamt Kastellaun including the Vogtei of Senheim and 1/3 of the bailiwick of Veltheim and Strümmich (originally part of the County of Sponheim)
- Oberamt Bergzabern including the Vogtei of Kleeburg, Annweiler am Trifels, Wegelnburg
- Amt Nohfelden
- Oberamt Gutenberg (acquired in 1768 in a territorial exchange with the Electoral Palatinate)
- Amt Seltz and Hagenbach
- Lordship of Bischwiller

Guttenberg, Seltz and Hagenbach and Bischwiller were French fiefs, the others were German.

== History ==
=== 15th century ===
During the reign of Louis I, who conducted four unsuccessful feuds against his cousin Frederick I, Elector Palatine, the districts of Lambsheim, Wachenheim and Waldböckelheim were lost to the Electoral Palatinate. Frederick III, Holy Roman Emperor, who was also in conflict with the Electoral Palatinate, appointed Louis I as his field marshal and recognized Palatine Zweibrücken as a duchy. Louis I stimulated mining and simplified the administration of the duchy.

Initially, Meisenheim was the capital. In 1477, the Electoral Palatinate threatened Meisenheim and the capital had to be moved to Zweibrücken, where it remained until 1793.

Alexander's Church (Alexanderskirche) is the oldest church in Zweibrücken, a late-Gothic Protestant hall church built from 1493 to 1514 as a gift from Alexander, Count Palatine of Zweibrücken after his return from a pilgrimage to the Holy Land; descendant counts and dukes of the line are buried in its crypt.

=== 16th century ===
After Louis' death, the duchy was not divided. His testament required dukes Alexander and Kaspar to rule the duchy jointly. However, Alexander declared his older brother mentally ill, locked him up and ruled the duchy alone. Alexander also waged war on the Electoral Palatinate; his troops looted the Palatinate during the Landshut War of Succession. In 1505, when the war ended with an imperial decision, some territory was transferred from the Electoral Palatinate to Palatine Zweibrücken. Alexander concluded an inheritance treaty with the new Elector Philip, which considerably improved relations between the two countries.

Alexander and Louis II introduced primogeniture, the rule that the whole of the principality would henceforth be inherited by the eldest son. Bischweiler was acquired in 1542, during the regency of Count Palatine Rupert of Veldenz. In 1544, the cadet branch of Palatine Veldenz split off. In 1553, the County of Lützelstein (now La Petite-Pierre in Alsace) was purchased from the Electoral Palatinate. Count Palatine Wolfgang dissolved the monasteries in his territory, thereby augmenting his revenues, and acquired the territory of the Disibodenberg Abbey. In 1557, he inherited Palatine Neuburg, half of the Hinder ("Further") County of Sponheim and half of the Lordship of Guttenberg from the Palatinate under the Treaty of Heidelberg; this more than doubled his territory. In 1558, he dissolved Hornbach Abbey and took its territory and half the County of Molsheim. In 1559, the Electoral line died out and Wolfgang inherited a share in the Further County of Sponheim. He used these large gains to give each of his five sons some territory: the independent Palatine Neuburg and Palatine Zweibrücken, which fell to John I's second son in 1569, and the non-sovereign collateral lines Palatine Sulzbach, Palatine Vohenstrauß-Parkstein and Palatine Birkenfeld.

=== 17th century ===
During the Thirty Years' War, the duchy was occupied by imperial forces and Count Palatine John II of Zweibrücken had to flee to Metz. His son and successor Frederick returned in 1645. When Frederick died without a male heir in 1661, he was succeeded by his cousin Frederick Louis. During his reign, the land was occupied by France in 1676. Zweibrücken was a fief of the Bishopric of Metz, which had been annexed by France. In 1680, France, therefore, annexed Zweibrücken as well. In 1681, Frederick Louis died in exile, without male descendants.

The 1697 Treaty of Ryswick returned the duchy to its rightful owner, who was a cousin-once-removed of Frederick Louis, Count Palatine Charles II of Kleeburg, who was also king of Sweden as Charles XI.

=== 18th century ===
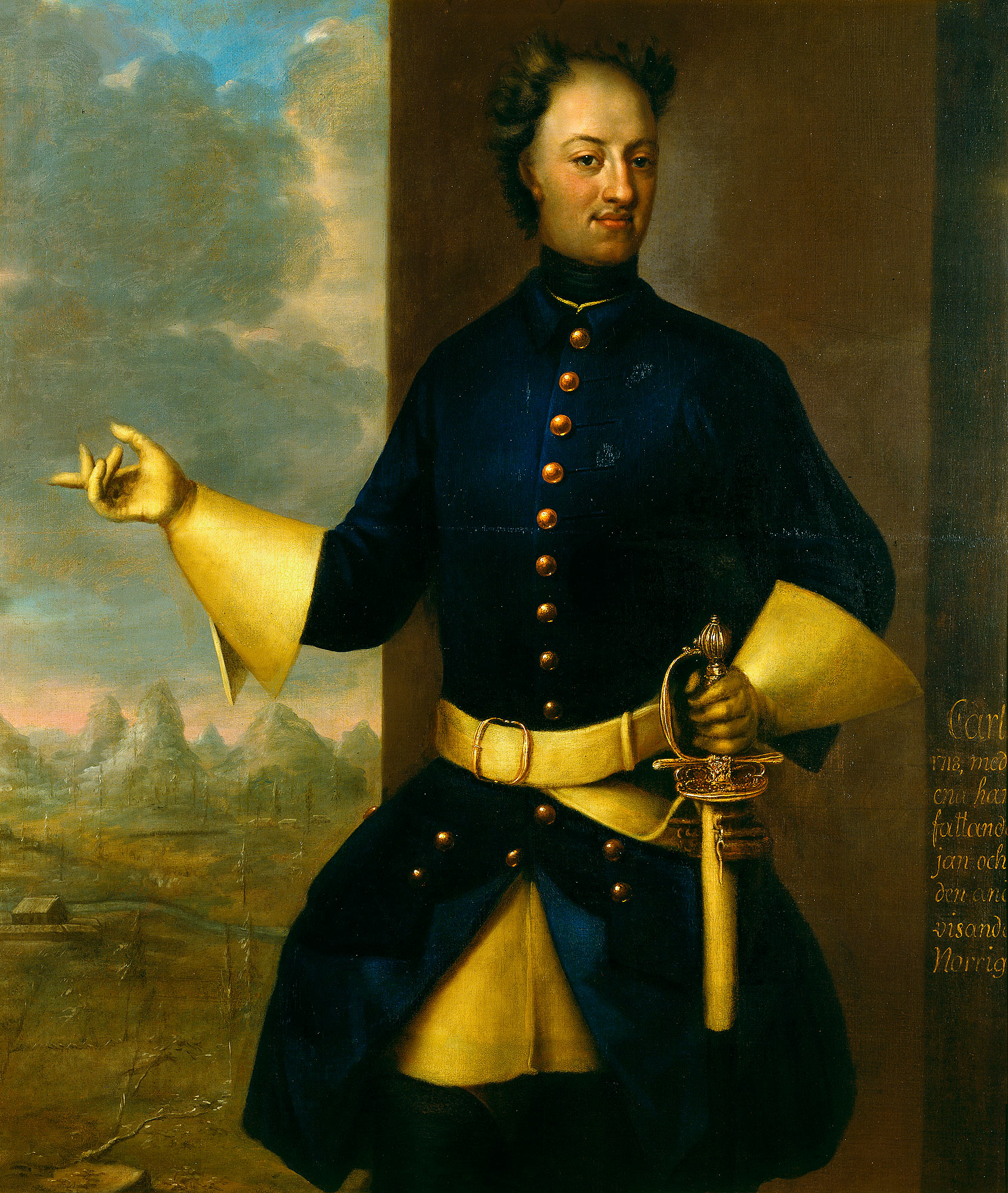
Charles XII, King of Sweden (1682–1718). Portrait by Johann Heinrich Wedekind

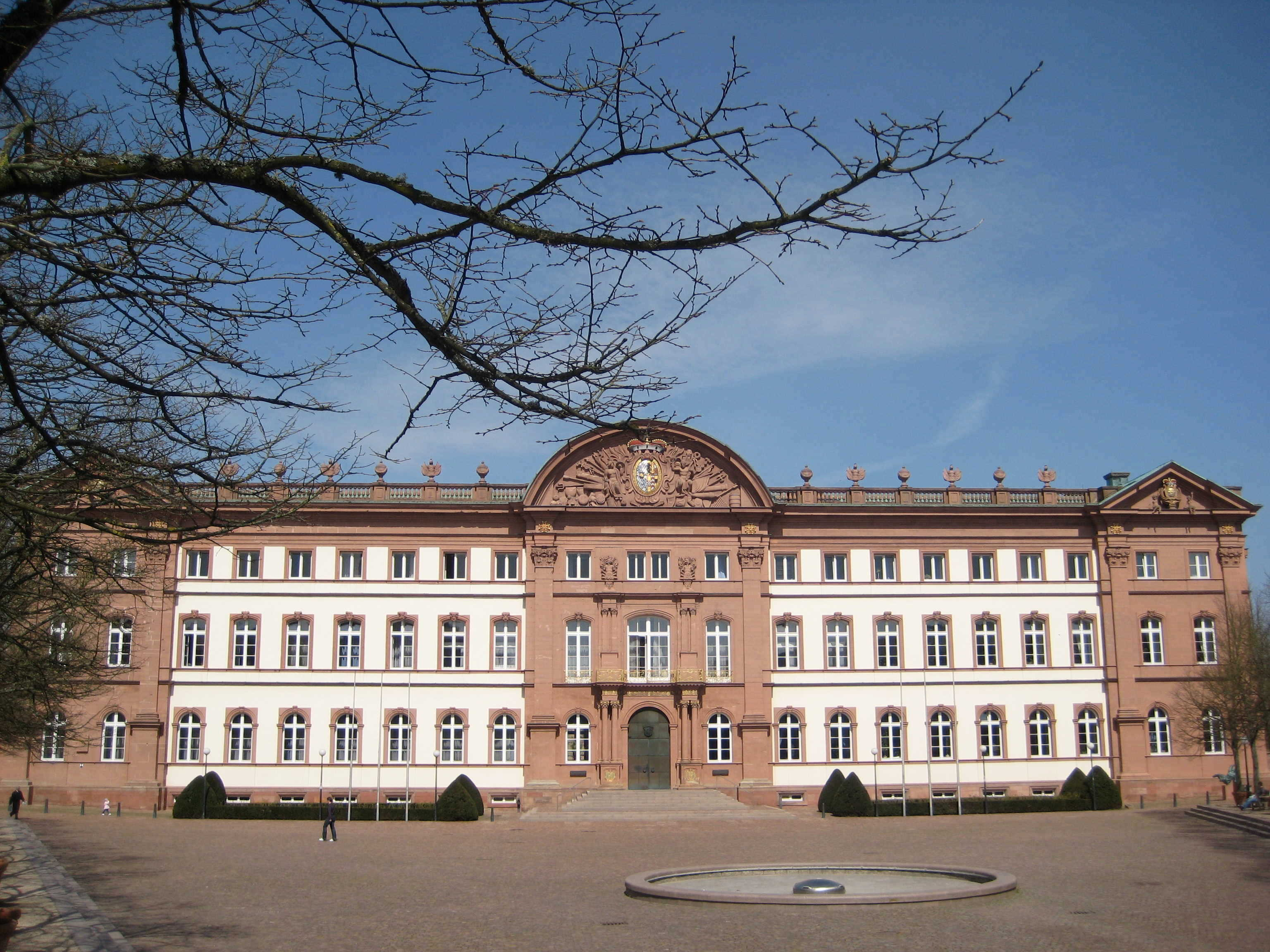
Zweibrücken Palace

The personal union with Sweden lasted until the death of Charles XII of Sweden in 1718. When Charles XII died without children, the Swedish crown was inherited by his sister Ulrika Eleonora, while Zweibrücken went to his cousin Gustav, Duke of Zweibrücken. Because of this, exiled Polish King Stanisław Leszczyński who had been named Count Palatine of Zweibrücken as a Prince exercising the head of state's authority on behalf of Charles XII in 1714 was forced to leave a year after his death in 1719.

From 1725 to 1778, the counts palatine resided in Zweibrücken Castle; they then moved to Karlsberg Castle near Homburg, to emphasize their claim to inherit the Duchy of Bavaria. Members of the ruling family were buried in the castle church in Meisenheim and later in the Alexander Church in Zweibrücken (badly damaged in World War II).

Gustav was the last Count Palatine of the Kleeburg line; when he died in 1731 without a male heir, the duchy was seized by the Empire. In 1734, the Emperor invested Count Palatine Christian III of Birkenfeld with Zweibrücken. Birkenfeld had been split off from Zweibrücken for a cadet line in 1584. His son Christian IV converted to Catholicism in 1758.

During Christian IV's reign, the fragmentation of the area was reduced by exchange of territories. For example, in 1768, Odernheim and half of Molsheim where transferred to the Electoral Palatinate, in exchange for Neuburg, the district of Hagenbach, district of Selz and Selz Abbey. In 1776, the "Hinder" County of Sponheim was divided between Zweibrücken and Baden, with Zweibrücken receiving Kastellaun, Traben-Trarbach with Starkenburg and Allenbach, and Baden receiving Birkenfeld, Frauenburg and Herrstein.

In 1793 the French First Republic occupied the Left Bank of the Rhine, including the territory of Zweibrücken. The French annexation of this territory was recognised by the Holy Roman Emperor in a secret clause of the Treaty of Campo Formio signed on 17 October 1797. On 4 November 1797, the occupied territory was incorporated into the newly founded French département of Mont-Tonnerre, with its capital at Mainz. The 1799 extinction of the senior Wittelsbach branches made the last Count Palatine of Zweibrücken, Maximilian Joseph, Elector of Bavaria, as Maximilian IV Joseph, as well as Elector Palatine, as Maximilian II Joseph.

Christian IV Reign, Regiment Royal Deux-Ponts (Zweibrücken) French Expeditionary Regiments in the American Revolution.

=== 19th century ===
Palatine Zweibrücken formally ceased to exist by the Treaty of Lunéville in 1801, which reaffirmed and recognised internationally the French acquisitions laid out in the Treaty of Campo Formio.

In 1806, Maximilian Joseph became King of Bavaria, as Maximilian I Joseph, and the role of Elector ceased to exist.

After the Congress of Vienna in 1815, some parts of the former County Palatine were returned to Maximilian Joseph, now King Maximilian I Joseph of Bavaria, together with parts of the former Electorate and territories formerly owned by different families. Maximilian Joseph merged these left-bank territories to form the Rheinkreis, known after 1837 simply as Pfalz (Palatinate) and sometimes called Rheinpfalz (Rhenish Palatinate). This area largely corresponds with the modern Palatinate region and Saarpfalz-Kreis.

== Administration ==
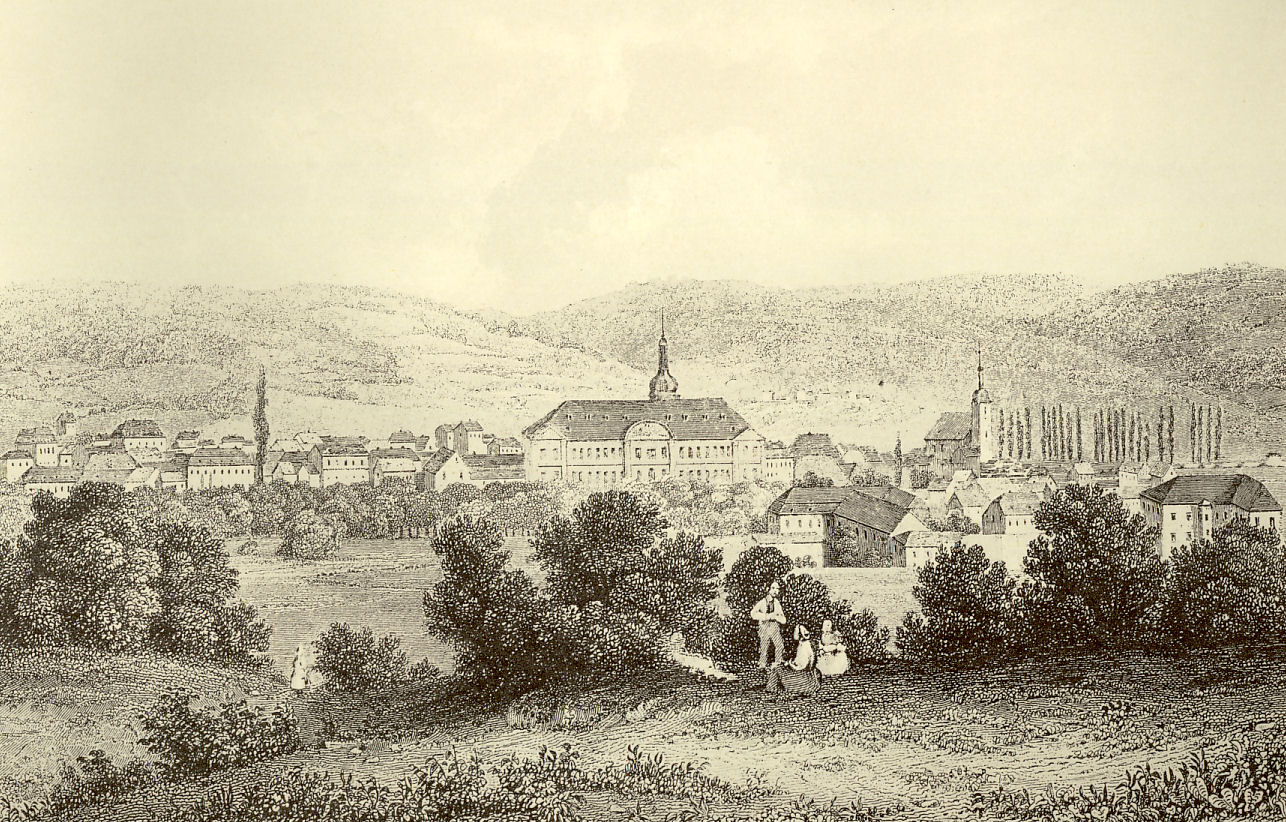
View of Zweibrücken; engraving after a painting by Theodor Verhas

In the duchy, there was no authority that would have limited the power of the Duke. Even the urban population were legally serfs until that status was repealed by John I on 21 April 1571 (although the situation in the city of Zweibrücken had already been somewhat eased by decrees from the years 1352 and 1483). Young men were required to serve six years in the militia.

The highest administrative body was the cabinet; in whose meetings the Duke participated. The treasury was responsible for finance, mining and forestry. There was no separation between the judiciary and the administration. Justice was meted out by officials with the rank of Schultheiß. The highest court in the land was the Court of Appeals in Zweibrücken; its traditions are continued today by Zweibrücken's Oberlandesgericht. After 1774, appeals from the court in Zweibrücken to the Reichskammergericht were no longer possible. In the Alsatian parts of the country, however, appeals to the Conseil souverain d’Alsace in Colmar were possible from about 1680. Important statutes were the Court Judicial Order of 1605, the Lower Court Order of 1657, and later the Criminal Procedure of 1724, and Marriage and Guardianship Regulations. In areas where no state law was available, imperial law applied.

Administratively, the country was divided into eight districts: Zweibrücken, Homburg, Lichtenberg, Meisenheim, Trarbach, Kastellaun, Bergzabern and Guttenberg.

== Religion and church ==
In the 1520s, Reformation was introduced in several towns in Palatine Zweibrücken, including Zweibrücken itself, where Johann Schwebel was the duke's chaplain and later parson. Schwebel was also a leading figure when several pastors of the duchy signed the Wittenberg Concord and when the first attempts were made to form a uniform territorial church with the two small Church Orders from 1533 and 1539. Regent at that time was Rupert, Count Palatine of Veldenz, who ruled in behalf of his nephew Wolfgang, who was still a minor. Theologically, Schwebel followed the lead of Martin Bucer in Strasbourg. After Schwebel died in 1540, Wolfgang took over in 1544. While chancellor Ulrich Sitzinger and his 1557 extensive Church Order were influenced by Philipp Melanchthon, Wolfgang later adopted a stricter Gnesio-Lutheran policy.

After Wolfgang's death, his son John I joined the Reformed confession in 1588. In dies decretorius of 1624, Zweibrücken was still ruled by a Reformed prince, so under the Cuius regio, eius religio rule of the 1648 Peace of Westphalia, this became the established religion. In the period of the French Reunion (1680–1697), Catholic churches were again permitted and in 1697 under the Swedish administration after the Treaty of Ryswick, Lutheran congregations were re-established as well.

Administratively, the Reformed Church was organized similarly to the secular authorities: each secular district corresponded to a church district headed by a superintendent or an inspector. Priests were state officials and were regularly visited by a commission consisting of the district superintendent, the secular bailiff and a representative of the central administration in Zweibrücken. There was no bishop or church president, although the superintendent of Zweibrücken had a more prominent position than his colleagues. The parish churches of the individual districts convened regularly; sometimes all clergy in the duchy convened in a national synod. There was no institutionalized national church council; initially, this function was exercised by the secular cabinet college, assisted by the superintendent of Zweibrücken. In the 18th century, however, a national church council was created; its membership consisting of secular councillors.

From the beginning, the lay element played a special role in the church in Zweibrücken. The Reformation revived the ancient office of the Elder, a layman chosen by the community, who would supervise the lifestyle of the congregation, the pastor, the funds and the property of the parish.

== Ducal arms ==
Arms of Palatinate-Zweibrücken

Around 1720, Palatinate-Zweibrücken added the symbols of the United Duchies of Jülich-Cleves-Berg to its coat of arms. It was parted per pale. The dexter side was quartered, in the first and fourth quarter the Palatine Lion, in second and third the Bavarian silver and blue "bendy lozengy" pattern, and overall a silver shield with a crowned blue lion for Zweibrücken itself. The sinister side was quarterly of six (in two rows of three), combining the lion of Jülich, the escarbuncle of Cleves, the lion of Berg, the red and silver chequy fess of Mark, the triple chevrons of Ravensberg and the bar of Moers.

== Counts Palatine of Zweibrücken ==
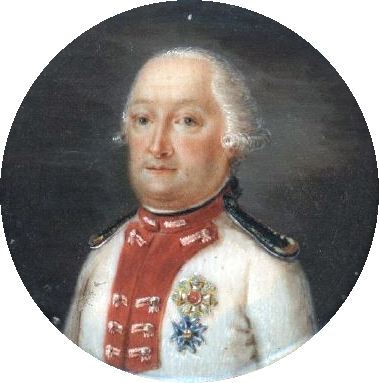
Charles II August (1775–1795)

- Stephen (1385–1459), Count Palatine of Zweibrücken, 1410–1459
  - Louis I the Black (1424–1489), Count Palatine of Zweibrücken, 1459–1489; second son
    - Kaspar (1458–1527), Count Palatine of Zweibrücken, 1489–1490; ruled jointly with his brother before being deposed by him
    - Alexander the Lame (1462–1514), Count Palatine of Zweibrücken, 1489–1514
      - Louis II the Younger (1502–1532), Count Palatine of Zweibrücken, 1514–1532
        - Wolfgang (1526–1569), Count Palatine of Zweibrücken, 1532–1569
          - John I the Lame (1550–1604), Count Palatine of Zweibrücken, 1569–1604; second son
            - John II the Younger (1584–1635), Count Palatine of Zweibrücken, 1604–1635
              - Frederick (1616–1661), Count Palatine of Zweibrücken, 1635–1661
            - Frederick Casimir (1585–1645), Count Palatine of Zweibrücken-Landsberg
              - Frederick Louis (1619–1681), Count Palatine of Zweibrücken, 1661–1681
            - John Casimir (1589–1652), Count Palatine of Zweibrücken-Kleeburg
              - Charles X Gustav (1622–1660), King of Sweden and Count Palatine of Zweibrücken-Kleeburg
                - Charles XI (1655–1697), Count Palatine of Zweibrücken, 1681–1697; also King of Sweden
                  - Charles XII (1682–1718), Count Palatine of Zweibrücken, 1697–1718; also King of Sweden
                    - Stanisław I Leszczyński (1677–1766), prince exercising the head of state's authority, 1714–1719; former King of Poland in exile
              - Adolph John I (1629–1689), Count Palatine of Zweibrücken-Kleeburg
                - Gustav Samuel Leopold (1670–1731), Count Palatine of Zweibrücken, 1718–1731
          - Charles I (1560–1600), Count Palatine of Zweibrücken-Birkenfeld
            - Christian I (1598–1654), Count Palatine of Birkenfeld-Bischweiler
              - Christian II (1637–1717), Count Palatine of Zweibrücken-Birkenfeld
                - Christian III (1674–1735), Count Palatine of Zweibrücken, 1731/1734–1735
                  - Christian IV (1722–1775), Count Palatine of Zweibrücken, 1735–1775
                  - Frederick Michael (1724–1767), Count Palatine of Zweibrücken-Birkenfeld
                    - Charles II August (1746–1795), Count Palatine of Zweibrücken, 1775–1795
                    - Maximilian I Joseph (1756–1825), Count Palatine of Zweibrücken, 1795–1805; also Elector of Bavaria from 1799

== See also ==
- House of Palatinate-Zweibrücken, the Royal House of Sweden from 1654 to 1720
