= Adolph John II, Count Palatine of Kleeburg =

German nobleman (1666–1701)

Adolph John

Adolph John II (German: Adolf Johann II; 21 August 1666 – 27 April 1701) was the Count Palatine of Kleeburg from 1689 until 1701.

== Life ==
Adolph John was born in Bergzabern in 1666 as the eldest surviving son of Adolph John I, Count Palatine of Kleeburg, and Elsa Elisabeth Brahe. He succeeded his father in 1689. Adolph John died in Laiuse Castle in 1701 and was buried in Stockholm. As he never married he was succeeded by his brother Gustavus Samuel Leopold.

== Ancestors ==
Ancestors of Adolph John II, Count Palatine of Kleeburg

8. John I, Count Palatine of Zweibrücken
4. John Casimir, Count Palatine of Kleeburg
9. Magdalene of Jülich-Cleves-Berg
2. Adolph John I, Count Palatine of Kleeburg
10. Charles IX of Sweden
5. Catherine of Sweden
11. Maria of the Palatinate-Simmern
1. Adolph John II, Count Palatine of Kleeburg
6. Nicholas Brahe af Wisingsborg
3. Else Elizabeth Brahe af Wisingsborg

Preceded by Adolph John I	Duke of Kleeburg; 1689–1701	Succeeded by Gustavus Samuel Leopold
