= Palatinate-Simmern and Zweibrücken =

European polity

Counties Palatine of Simmern and Zweibrücken Pfalzgrafschaft Simmern und Zweibrücken
- 1410–1459
- Coat of arms
- Status: State of the Holy Roman Empire
- Capital: Zweibrücken
- Government: Principality
- Historical era: Middle Ages
  - Partitioned from Electoral Palatinate: 1410
  - Inherited Veldenz: 1444
  - Inheritance partitioned: 1444
  - Partitioned in twain on death of Stephen: 1459
Preceded by	Succeeded by
Electoral Palatinate; County Palatine of Veldenz	House of Palatinate-Simmern; Palatine Zweibrücken

Palatinate-Simmern and Zweibrücken (German: Pfalz-Simmern-Zweibrücken) was a state of the Holy Roman Empire based in the Simmern and Zweibrücken in modern Rhineland-Palatinate, Germany.

Palatinate-Simmern and Zweibrücken was created in 1410 out of the partition of the Palatinate after the death of King Rupert III for his son Stephen. In 1444 the County of Veldenz was added to the state but later in the year Stephen partitioned his territories between his sons Frederick (who received Simmern) and Louis (who received Zweibrücken and Veldenz). In 1448, Stephen inherited half the territories of Palatinate-Neumarkt but sold them to Palatinate-Mosbach.

== Count Palatine ==
- Stephen, 1410–59
