= Euphrosina Heldina von Dieffenau =

Swedish courtier

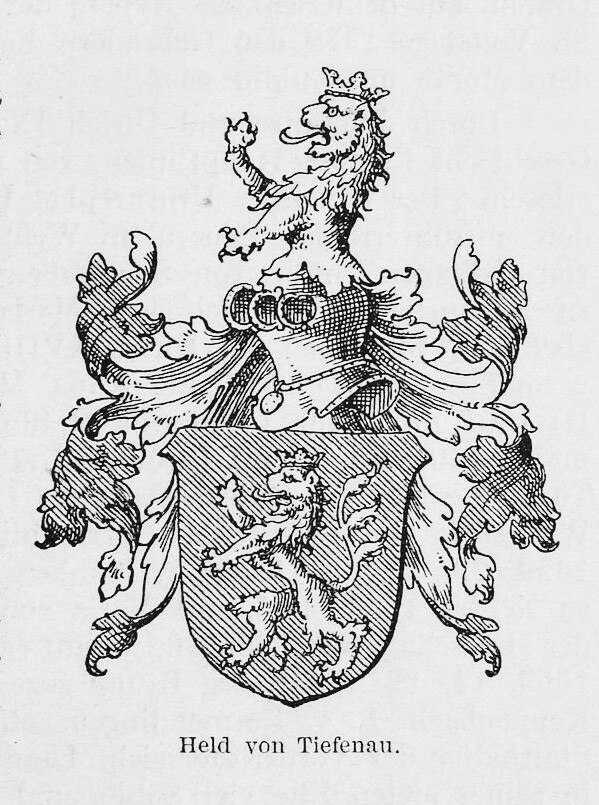
The Tiefenau-Wappen coat of arms.

Euphrosina Heldina von Dieffenau, or Heldin (died 1636), was a Swedish courtier.

Originally from Germany, she became courtier to Catherine of Sweden, Countess Palatine of Kleeburg in 1590. After the death of Catherine's mother, Maria of the Palatinate-Simmern, she became the lady-in-waiting, nurse and in practice foster mother of Catherine. She were the confidant of Catherine and the two of them had a close relationship for the rest of their life, sometimes by letters, which are preserved. She married a German officer in Swedish service, but remained in the service of Catherine also after Catherine's marriage as her Mistress of the Robes. She was described as educated and seen as a role model for female nobles in this regard, could speak Latin and was given the task to practice reading and prayer with the heir to the throne, Gustav II Adolf of Sweden, and converse with foreign ambassadors.
