= Elsa Beata Brahe =

Swedish noble (1629–1653)

Elsa Beata Brahe

Elsa Beata Persdotter Brahe (1629 – 7 April 1653), Elizabeth Beatrice was a Swedish countess and duchess, married to Adolph John I, Count Palatine of Kleeburg, Duke of Stegeborg, the brother of king Charles X Gustav of Sweden.

== Life ==
She was the daughter of Per Brahe the Younger and Kristina Katarina Stenbock, and was raised by her paternal grandmother Elsa Gyllenstierna at Rydboholm Castle. As the majority of female nobles at the time, her education mainly focused on how to manage an estate, and how to act in a representational social life.

Prior to her marriage, she served as maid of honour to queen Christina of Sweden. The queen introduced her to Adolph John, and the couple was engaged in 1646. The wedding took place at Tre Kronor (castle) 1649 in the presence of the monarch.

The marriage was described as unhappy, and her spouse was said to neglect in favor of his personal pleasures. While the second spouse of Adolph John has been described as his equal in his bad habits, his first spouse has in contrast been described as his opposite in this regard and as the superior of them both. The economic circumstances of the ducal couple was solved when Adolph John was appointed general governor of Västergötland in 1651.

Elsa Beata had only one child: a son who lived a few months after birth in 1652. She died during a visit to Vadstena after a period of ill health.
