= Adolph John I, Count Palatine of Kleeburg =

Adolph John I
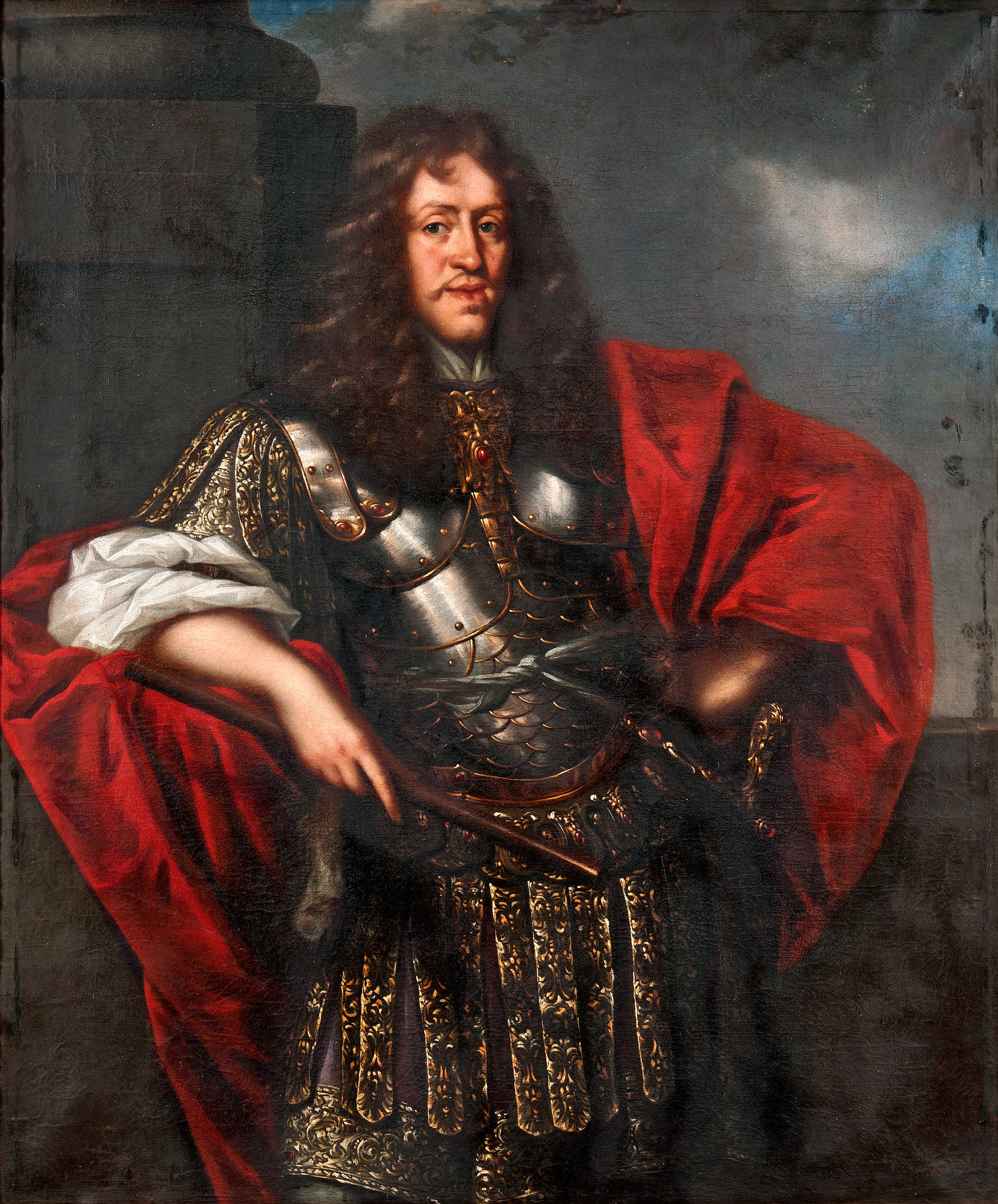
- Prince Adolph John, Count Palatine of Kleeburg

Count Palatine of Kleeburg
- Reign: 1654–1689
- Predecessor: Charles Gustav
- Successor: Adolph John II
- Born: 11 October 1629; Stegeborg Castle, Sweden
- Died: 14 October 1689 (aged 60)
- Spouse: Elizabeth Beatrice Brahe; Elsa Elizabeth Brahe
- Issue: Catherine; Maria Elizabeth Louise; Adolph John; Gustav Samuel Leopold
- House: Wittelsbach (Note: A member of the House of Palatinate-Zweibrücken (Kleeburg line))
- Father: John Casimir, Count Palatine of Kleeburg
- Mother: Catherine of Sweden

Adolph John I (German: Adolf Johann; Swedish: Adolf Johan; 11 October 1629 – 14 October 1689) was Count Palatine of Kleeburg from 1654 until his death in 1689. He was the younger brother of King Charles X Gustav of Sweden and was considered a Prince of Sweden until 1660. From 1656 to 1659, he served as generalissimus of the Swedish armies in Poland and Prussia.

== Life ==
Adolph John was born in Stegeborg Castle, Sweden (now in Söderköping Municipality) in 1629 as the youngest son of John Casimir, Count Palatine of Kleeburg and Princess Catherine of Sweden. after his elder brother Charles Gustav became the King of Sweden. At that time, he also obtained the County Palatine of Kleeburg.

In early 1659, he was a part of the Swedish offensive into Ducal Prussia, which led to initial Swedish gains but were lost after an allied counteroffensive in March.

== Marriage ==
Adolph John married Countess Elizabeth Beatrice Brahe (31 August 1629 – 7 September 1653) on 19 June 1649 and had the following son:

- Gustavus Adolph (9 March 1652 – 1 August 1652)

Adolph John married Countess Elsa Elizabeth Brahe (29 January 1632 – 24 February 1689), daughter of Count Nicholas Brahe af Wisingsborg in 1661. They had the following children:

- Catherine (10 December 1661 – 27 May 1720), married to count Kristofer Gyllenstierna, no issue;
- Maria Elizabeth Louise (16 April 1663 – 23 January 1748), married to count Christian Gottlob von Gersdorff auf Oppach, no issue;
- Charles John (15 September 1664 – 10 December 1664);
- John Casimir (4 September 1665 – 29 May 1666);
- Adolph John (21 August 1666 – 27 April 1701), never married;
- Gustavus Casimir (29 June 1667 – 21 August 1669);
- Christina Magdalena (4 April 1669 – 21 June 1670);
- Gustav Samuel Leopold (12 April 1670 – 17 September 1731), no issue;
- unnamed infant (12 December 1671).

Although he was the father of 10 children, Adolph John I had no grandchildren at all. If he had had progeny, they would have had a strong claim upon the throne of Sweden after the line of his brother, Charles X Gustav, ended with Ulrika Eleonora of Sweden. Since he had no progeny, the throne was claimed by the heirs of his eldest sister Christina Magdalena of the Palatinate-Zweibrücken.

== Ancestry ==
Ancestors of Adolph John I, Count Palatine of Kleeburg

8. Wolfgang, Count Palatine of Zweibrücken
4. John I, Count Palatine of Zweibrücken
9. Anna of Hesse
2. John Casimir, Count Palatine of Kleeburg
10. William, Duke of Jülich-Cleves-Berg
5. Magdalene of Jülich-Cleves-Berg
11. Maria of Austria
1. Adolph John I, Count Palatine of Kleeburg
12. Gustav I of Sweden
6. Charles IX of Sweden
13. Margaret Leijonhufvud
3. Catherine of Sweden
14. Louis VI, Elector Palatine
7. Maria of the Palatinate-Simmern
15. Elisabeth of Hesse

== Works cited ==
- von Essen, Michael Fredholm (2023). The Danish Wars, 1657-1660. Charles X's Wars. Vol. 3. Helion & Company. ISBN 9781915113603.

Preceded by Charles Gustav	Duke of Kleeburg; 1654–1689	Succeeded by Adolph John II
