= Brask =

Brask is a Scandinavian surname. Notable people with the surname include:

- Alice Brask (born 1938), Danish politician
- Bent Brask (born 1958). Norwegian swimmer
- Bill Brask (1946 - ), American golfer
- Birte Høeg Brask
- Christina Brask (1459–1520), Swedish writer and translator
- Hans Brask (1464–1538), Bishop of Linköping, Sweden
- Kristiina Brask (born 1990), Finnish pop singer
- Lars-Christian Brask (born 1963), Danish politician
- Ole Brask
