= Palatinate-Kleeburg =

State of the Holy Roman Empire

Palatinate-Kleeburg Pfalz-Kleeburg (German)
- 1604–1731
- Status: Imperial state of the Holy Roman Empire
- Capital: Kleeburg
- Historical era: Early modern period
  - Established: 1604
  - Disestablished: 1731
Preceded by	Succeeded by
Palatinate-Zweibrücken	Palatinate-Zweibrücken-Birkenfeld

Palatinate-Kleeburg was an imperial state of the Holy Roman Empire, centered on the Alsatian lordship of Kleeburg.

== History ==
Palatinate-Kleeburg was created in 1604 as a cadet partition of Palatinate-Zweibrücken for John Casimir, the youngest son of John I, Count Palatine of Zweibrücken. In 1615, he married Catherine of Sweden, the eldest surviving daughter of King Charles IX of Sweden. Their eldest son, Charles Gustav, succeeded his father as Count Palatine of Kleeburg in 1652 and ascended the Swedish throne as Charles X Gustav in 1654. He then transferred Kleeburg to his younger brother, Adolph John I.

In 1718, Gustav Samuel Leopold, the last male member of the Kleeburg line, inherited the Duchy of Zweibrücken following the death of his cousin, King Charles XII of Sweden. Gustav died without issue in 1731, and Palatinate-Kleeburg was inherited by the Palatinate-Zweibrücken-Birkenfeld branch of the House of Wittelsbach.
