= Christina Magdalena of the Palatinate-Zweibrücken =

Swedish princess

Christina Magdalena
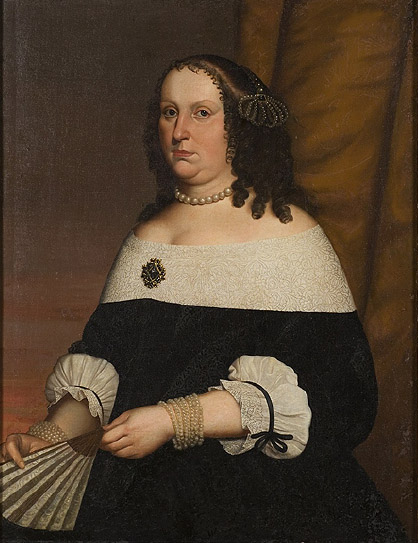
- Princess Christina Magdalene by an unknown contemporary artist
- Born: 27 May 1616; Nyköping, Sweden
- Died: 14 August 1662 (aged 46); Carlsburg Castle
- Burial: Castle Church, Pforzheim
- Spouse: Frederick VI, Margrave of Baden-Durlach (m. 1642)
- Issue: Christine, Duchess of Saxe-Gotha-Altenburg; Frederick VII, Margrave of Baden-Durlach; Prince Charles Gustav; Princess Catherine Barbara; Johanna Elisabeth, Margravine of Brandenburg-Ansbach
- House: Wittelsbach
- Father: John Casimir, Count Palatine of Kleeburg
- Mother: Princess Catherine of Sweden

Countess Palatine Christina Magdalena of Kleeburg (Swedish: Kristina Magdalena; 27 May 1616 – 14 August 1662) was a Swedish princess and Margravine of Baden-Durlach. She was the daughter of John Casimir, Count Palatine of Kleeburg, and Princess Catherine of Sweden, a granddaughter of King Gustav I of Sweden. Through her descendants, Christina Magdalena was an ancestor of the Swedish kings of the House of Holstein-Gottorp and the House of Bernadotte. She was also the sister of King Charles X Gustav of Sweden and spent much of her early life in Sweden.

== Biography ==
Christina Magdalena was born in Nyköping, Sweden, as her parents did not move to Germany until 1618, three years after their wedding. In 1622, the family moved back to Sweden to avoid the Thirty Years War. Christina Magdalena was described as a "somewhat pretty and pleasing woman" and was reportedly a friend of the queen, Maria Eleonora of Brandenburg. She accompanied Maria Eleonora to the King in Germany in 1631, and returned to Sweden with her in 1633. The last mentioned year, there was unsuccessful negotiations about a marriage to Bernard of Saxe-Weimar.

After the death of her mother in 1638, Christina Magdalena was asked by the Swedish parliament to contribute to the education of Maria Eleonora's daughter, the later Queen Christina. She did this until her marriage in 1642.

Negotiations for her marriage began in 1637, and included "a young and rich Marquess of Huntly" in 1641. The same year, Frederick VI, Margrave of Baden-Durlach visited Sweden. After having befriended her brother, he was accepted as her suitor.

The wedding, held in Stockholm, was postponed until 30 November 1642 after a fire broke out at the ball before their designated wedding date on 26 November. Her spouse applied for a position in the Swedish army, but the Swedish military did not wish to employ foreign princes, and therefore, the couple moved to Germany.

In 1654, her brother succeeded as king of Sweden, and in 1656, he granted her to estate Kutzenhausen, which provided her with an income. Christina Magdalena became Margravine consort of Baden-Durlach when her spouse became Margrave in 1659. She was widowed in 1662.

In Germany, Christina Magdalena was given a good judgement by her contemporaries and described as an "excellent" character.

== Issue ==
All Swedish kings from Adolf Frederick to Charles XIII descend from Christina Magdalena. The eight children of Frederick and Christina, including two ancestors of Swedish royal lines, were:

- Friedrich Kasimir (1643–1644)
- Christine (1645–1705)

∞ 1. 1665 Albert II, Margrave of Brandenburg-Ansbach (1620–1667)
∞ 2. 1681 Frederick I, Duke of Saxe-Gotha-Altenburg (1646–1691)

- Eleonore Katharine (*/† 1646)
- Friedrich VII. Magnus (1647–1709), Margrave of Baden-Durlach

∞ 1670 Princess Auguste Marie of Schleswig-Holstein-Gottorp (1649–1728) (→ Ancestors of Swedish kings of the House of Holstein-Gottorp, via their daughter Albertina Frederika of Baden-Durlach, who was the mother of King Adolf Fredrick of Sweden; ancestors of the House of Bernadotte, via Gustaf VI Adolf's mother, Victoria of Baden, who was a granddaughter of Adolf Frederick's great-granddaughter Sophia of Sweden

- Charles Gustav of Baden-Durlach (1648–1703)

∞ 1677 Princess Anna Sophie of Braunschweig-Wolfenbüttel (1659–1742)

- Katharine Barbara (1650–1733)
- Johanna Elizabeth of Baden-Durlach (born: 6 November 1651; died: 28 September 1680), married on 26 January 1673 the Margrave John Frederick of Brandenburg-Ansbach (born: 4 October 1654; died: 22 March 1686) (→ Ancestors of the Swedish kings of the House of Bernadotte, by Charles XV of Sweden's and Oscar II's mother, Josephine of Leuchtenberg, as was their daughter's daughter was her granddaughter)
- Friederike Eleonore (*/† 1658)

== Ancestry ==
Ancestors of Christina Magdalena of the Palatinate-Zweibrücken

8. Wolfgang, Count Palatine of Zweibrücken
4. John I, Count Palatine of Zweibrücken
9. Anna of Hesse
2. John Casimir, Count Palatine of Kleeburg
10. William, Duke of Jülich-Cleves-Berg
5. Magdalene of Jülich-Cleves-Berg
11. Maria of Austria
1. Countess Palatine Christina Magdalena of Kleeburg
12. Gustav I of Sweden
6. Charles IX of Sweden
13. Margaret Leijonhufvud
3. Princess Catherine of Sweden
14. Louis VI, Elector Palatine
7. Maria of the Palatinate-Simmern
15. Elisabeth of Hesse

== References and notes ==
Royal titles
Preceded by Countess Elisabeth Eusebia of Fürstenberg	Margavine consort of Baden-Durlach; 1659–1662	Succeeded by Augusta Marie of Holstein-Gottorp
