= John Casimir, Count Palatine of Kleeburg =

German nobleman

John Casimir
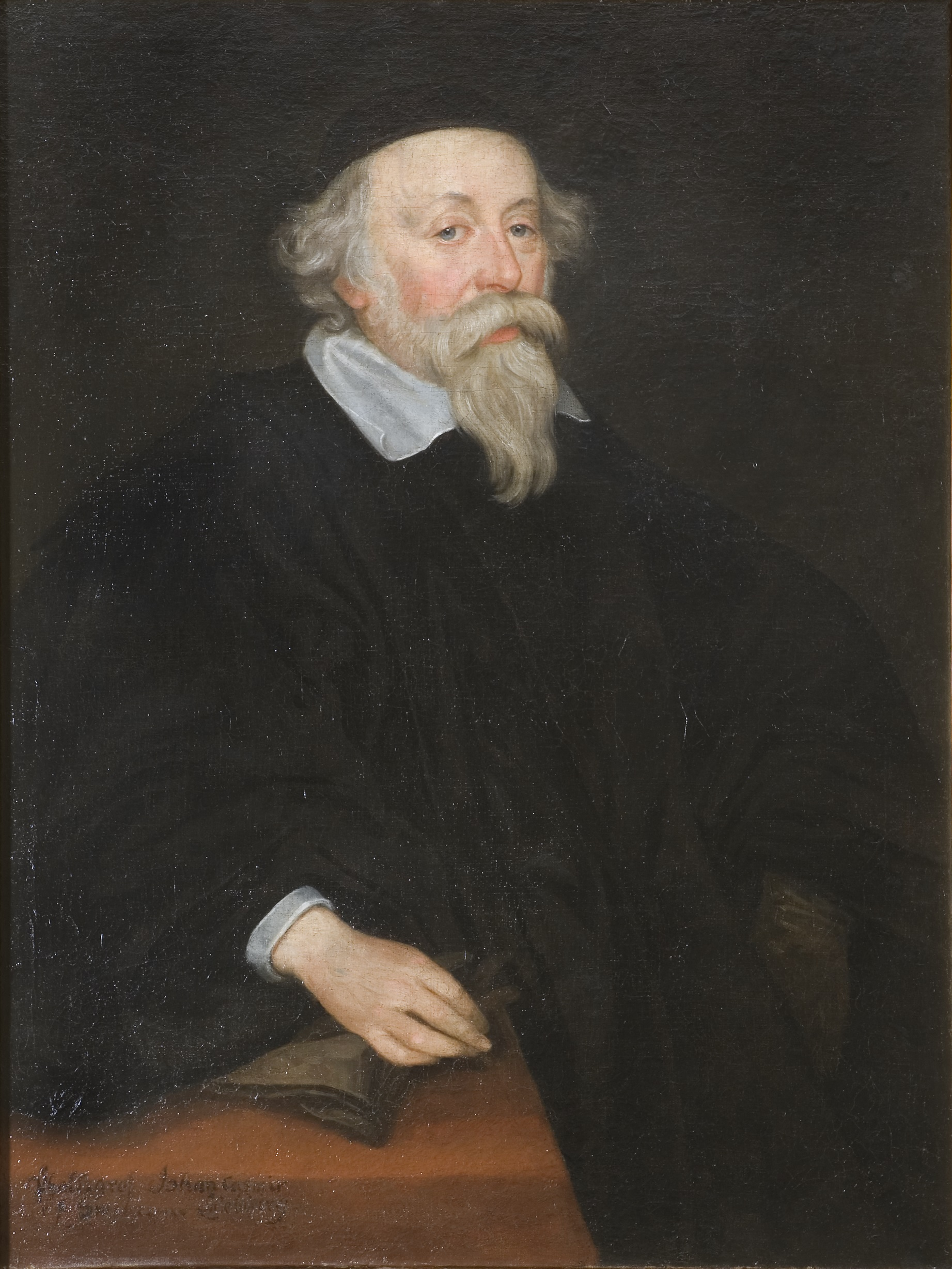
- Portrait by David Beck

Count Palatine of Kleeburg
- Reign: 1604–1652
- Predecessor: Position established
- Successor: Charles Gustav
- Born: 20 April 1589; Zweibrücken, Palatine Zweibrücken, Holy Roman Empire
- Died: 18 June 1652 (aged 63); Stegeborg Castle, Sweden
- Noble family: Wittelsbach (Note: Founder of the House of Palatinate-Zweibrücken (Kleeburg line))
- Spouse: Catherine of Sweden (m. 1615; died 1638)
- Issue Detail: Christina Magdalena; Charles X Gustav; Maria Euphrosyne; Eleonore Catharine; Adolf John
- Father: John I, Count Palatine of Zweibrücken
- Mother: Magdalene of Jülich-Cleves-Berg

John Casimir, Count Palatine of Zweibrücken-Kleeburg (German: Johann Kasimir; Swedish: Johan Kasimir; 20 April 1589, Zweibrücken – 18 June 1652, Stegeborg Castle) was the son of John I, Count Palatine of Zweibrücken and his wife, Duchess Magdalene of Jülich-Cleves-Berg. He was married to Catherine of Sweden and was the founder of a branch of Wittelsbach Counts Palatine often called the Swedish line, because it gave rise to three subsequent kings of Sweden, but more commonly known as the Kleeburg (or Cleebourg) line.

== Biography ==
In 1591 his father stipulated that, as the youngest son, John Casimir would receive as appanage the countship of Neukastell in the Palatinate. Upon their father's death in 1611, however, the eldest son, John II, Count Palatine of Zweibrucken, instead signed a compromise with John Casimir whereby the latter received only the castle at Neukastell coupled with an annuity of 3000 florins from the countship's revenues (similarly, John Casimir's elder brother, Frederick Casimir, received the castle at Landsberg with a small surrounding domain, instead of the entire Landsberg appanage bequeathed to him paternally).

On 11 June 1615, Casimir married his second cousin Catherine of Sweden, and their son eventually became King Charles X Gustav of Sweden. After the outbreak of the Thirty Years' War, John Casimir and his family were forced to flee to Strasbourg in 1620. In 1622, King Gustavus Adolphus of Sweden, Catherine's half-brother, summoned the family to Sweden. They arrived in late July that year, partly as a result of the dangers posed by the war and the king's lack of surviving siblings and children. The family settled at Stegeborg Castle in Östergötland, which was granted to John Casimir as security for Catherine's unpaid dowry. He remained in Sweden for the rest of his life and became involved in the country's military administration. From 1625, he generally commanded the forces stationed in Sweden while Gustavus Adolphus campaigned abroad.

== Family ==
Five of his children with Catherine survived infancy:

- Christina Magdalena (1616–1662); married Frederick VI, Margrave of Baden-Durlach. Adolf Frederick of Sweden was her great-grandson.
- Charles X Gustav of Sweden (1622–1660).
- Maria Euphrosyne (1625–1687); married Count Magnus Gabriel De la Gardie.
- Eleonore Catharine (1626–1692); married Frederick, Landgrave of Hesse-Eschwege.
- Adolf John (1629–1689).

== Ancestors ==
Ancestors of John Casimir, Count Palatine of Kleeburg

8. Louis II, Count Palatine of Zweibrücken
4. Wolfgang, Count Palatine of Zweibrücken
9. Elisabeth of Hesse
2. John I, Count Palatine of Zweibrücken
10. Philip I, Landgrave of Hesse
5. Anna of Hesse
11. Christine of Saxony
1. John Casimir, Count Palatine of Kleeburg
12. John III, Duke of Cleves
6. William, Duke of Jülich-Cleves-Berg
13. Maria, Duchess of Jülich-Berg
3. Magdalene of Jülich-Cleves-Berg
14. Ferdinand I, Holy Roman Emperor
7. Maria of Austria
15. Anna of Bohemia and Hungary

== Notes ==
John Casimir, Count Palatine of Kleeburg House of Wittelsbach Born: 20 April 1589 Died: 18 June 1652
New creation	Count Palatine of Kleeburg; 1604–1652	Succeeded by Charles Gustav
