= Catherine of Sweden, Countess Palatine of Kleeburg =

Swedish princess (1584–1638)

Catherine of Sweden
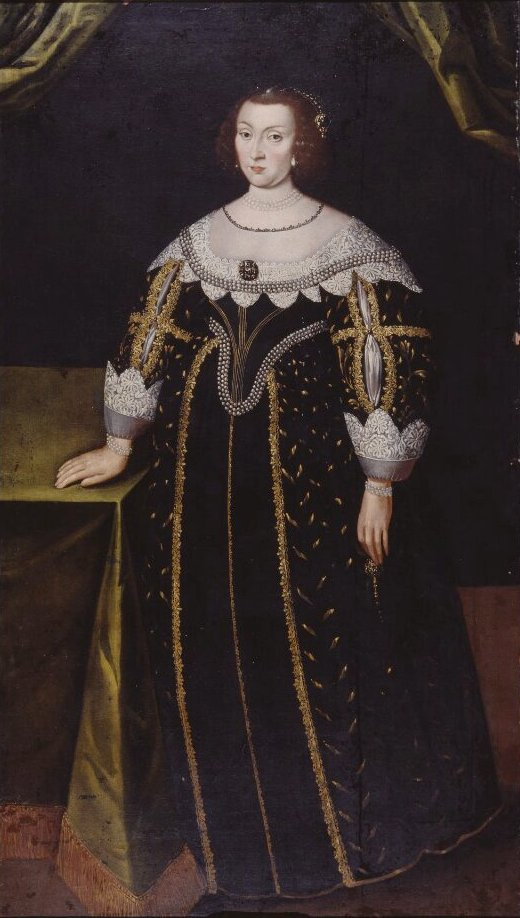
- Portrait by Jacob Heinrich Elbfas
- Born: 10 November 1584; Nyköping
- Died: 13 December 1638 (aged 54); Västerås
- Spouse: John Casimir of Palatinate-Zweibrücken (m. 1615)
- Issue Detail: Christina Magdalena, Margravine of Baden-Durlach; Charles X Gustav of Sweden; Maria Eufrosyne; Eleonora Catherine, Landgravine of Hesse-Eschwege; Adolph John I, Count Palatine of Kleeburg
- House: Vasa
- Father: Charles IX of Sweden
- Mother: Maria of Palatinate-Simmern

Princess Catherine

Catherine of Sweden (Swedish: Katarina; 10 November 1584 – 13 December 1638) was a Swedish princess and a Countess Palatine of Zweibrücken as the consort of her second cousin John Casimir of Palatinate-Zweibrücken. She is known as the periodical foster mother of Queen Christina of Sweden and the mother of Charles X Gustav of Sweden.

== Biography ==
=== Early life ===
Catherine was the only surviving child of King Charles IX of Sweden and his first spouse Maria of the Palatinate-Simmern. Her personality was described as "a happy union of her father's power and wisdom and her mother's tender humility". Her mother died in 1589, and she was placed in the care of the German Euphrosina Heldina von Dieffenau, whom she praised much later in life. In 1592, her father remarried to Christina of Holstein-Gottorp. She reportedly got along well with her stepmother and was close to her half siblings, especially her eldest brother, the future King Gustavus Adolphus, who is noted to have been very affectionate toward her. In later letters to her consort, however, it seems that she was not always as much in agreement with her stepmother as she gave the impression to be. Her father became regent in 1598, and was crowned king in 1607.

In 1611, her brother succeeded her father as King Gustavus Adolphus. Her brother found her sensible and wise, and she is reported to have acted as his confidante and adviser on several occasions. Catherine married late for a Princess of her period. Although she was a great heiress, her status on the international royal marriage market was uncertain because of the political situation in Sweden after her father had conquered the throne from his nephew Sigismund. Her parents marriage had been an alliance with the anti-Habsburg party in Germany, which in turn was allied with King Henry IV of France and the French Huguenots, and in 1599–1600, there were plans to arrange a marriage between her and the Protestant French Prince Henri, Duke of Rohan, leader of the French Huguenots. Henry married Marguerite de Béthune in 1603. After the Treaty of Knäred in 1613, her status became more secure. With the support of her stepmother Queen Dowager Christina, the queen dowager's brother Archbishop John Frederik of Bremen arranged the marriage between Catherine and her relative (Count Palatine) John Casimir of Palatinate-Zweibrücken. Though relatively poor, he had contacts which were deemed valuable to Sweden, though Count Axel Oxenstierna opposed the marriage.

The marriage took place on 11 June 1615 in Stockholm. Catherine was, by the will of both her parents as well as by the law regarding the dowry of Swedish Princesses, one of the wealthiest heirs in Sweden. As the economic situation at the time was strained, she remained in Sweden the first years after her marriage to guard her interests. In January 1618, she left for Germany. There, the couple was given the Kleeburg Castle in Northern Alsace as their residence. The year after, John Casimir started to build a new residence, the Renaissance Palace Katharinenburg near Kleeburg. In 1620, the Thirty Years' War forced them to flee to Strassburg.

=== Return to Sweden ===
In 1622, her brother King Gustavus Adolphus of Sweden asked her to return to Sweden with her family. The death of her younger brother in Sweden, as well as the lack of heirs to the Swedish throne was evidently the reason why the monarch wished to move her to safety away from the Thirty Years' War. Catherine accepted the invitation and arrived to Sweden with her family in June 1622. At her arrival, the birth of her son Charles immediately strengthened her position. In Sweden, she and her consort were granted Stegeborg Castle and a county in Östergötland as their fief and residence and as payment of her dowry: Catherine was styled Countess of Stegeborg. Catherine and John Casimir settled in well at Stegeborg, where they maintained a royal standard of living: they kept a court with sixty formal ladies-in-waiting and courtiers and an official table. Catherine actively engaged herself in the management of the estates, and was in 1626 given Skenas royal estate as her personal fief. Catherine was on very good terms with her brother King Gustavus Adolphus, who is known to have asked her for advice. During his trips, he often asked her to try to console and control his consort, Queen Maria Eleonora. Catherine was exposed to certain intrigues at court with the purpose of blackening her name in the eyes of the royal couple, but she managed to avoid these plots. She was on good terms with the dynasties of Pfalz and Brandenburg, with whom she corresponded, and who considered her to be wise and to have good judgement.

In 1631, Catherine was given the custody of her niece, Princess Christina, the heir to the throne, when the queen was allowed to join the king in Germany, where he participated in the Thirty Years' War. Christina remained in her care until Maria Eleonora returned to Sweden upon the death of Gustavus Adolphus in 1632. After the death of King Gustavus Adolphus, the couple came in conflict with the Guardian Government of Queen Christina over their position and rights to Stegeborg. When John Casimir broke with the royal council in 1633, the couple retired from court to Stegeborg. Catherine did not show any interest in participation in state affairs. In 1636, however, Queen Dowager Maria Eleonora was deemed an unsuitable guardian and deprived of the custody of the young monarch, and Catherine was appointed official guardian and foster mother with the responsibility of the young queen's upbringing. The appointment was made upon the recommendation of Count Axel Oxenstierna, and she reportedly accepted the task with reluctance. This appointment destroyed her relationship with Maria Eleonora. The years in Catherine's care are described by Christina as happy ones.

Princess Catherine personally enjoyed great respect and popularity in Sweden as a member of the royal house and as the foster parent of the monarch: however, this respect did not include her consort, who was given no task or position at court whatsoever. John Casimir was himself careful to point out her rank as a Royal Princess, but he was himself exposed to some humiliation because of their difference in rank. One example was at the opening of Parliament in 1633, when Catherine in accordance with the wish of the Royal Council followed Queen Christina in the procession, while John Casimir was given the choice to stand and watch the ceremony from a window or not be present at all.

Catherine died in Västerås, where the royal court had fled from an outbreak of plague in Stockholm. At her death, Axel Oxenstierna said, that he would rather have buried his own mother twice, than once again see "the premature death of this noble Princess". After her death, the royal council appointed two foster mothers for the queen to replace her: countess Ebba Leijonhufvud and Christina Natt och Dag.

The Katarina kyrka in Stockholm is named after her.

== Family ==
On 11 June 1615, Catherine married count palatine John Casimir of Palatinate-Zweibrücken. She gave birth to eight children over the following fifteen years, five of whom survived childhood:

- Christina Magdalena (27 May 1616 – 14 August 1662); married Frederick VI, Margrave of Baden-Durlach. King Adolf Frederick of Sweden was her great-grandson.
- Karl Friedrich (13 July 1618 – 13 September 1619); died in infancy.
- Elisabeth Amalie (11 September 1619 – 2 July 1628); died in childhood.
- Charles X Gustav (8 November 1622 – 23 February 1660), King of Sweden.
- Maria Eufrosyne (14 February 1625 – 24 October 1687); married Count Magnus Gabriel De la Gardie.
- Eleonora Catherine (17 May 1626 – 3 March 1692); married Frederick, Landgrave of Hesse-Eschwege.
- Adolf John (21 October 1629 – 24 October 1689).
- Gustav (c. 1631 – ?); died in infancy.

With the exception of Frederick I, Charles XIV John, and Oscar I, every subsequent king of Sweden has been a descendant of Catherine. Frederick I and Oscar I married descendants of Catherine, while Charles XIV John was adopted by her descendant Charles XIII.

== Ancestry ==
Ancestors of Catherine of Sweden, Countess Palatine of Kleeburg

Erik Johansson (Vasa)
Gustav I of Sweden (Vasa)
Cecilia Månsdotter (Eka)
Charles IX of Sweden (Vasa)
Erik Abrahamsson (Leijonhufvud)
Margaret Leijonhufvud
Ebba Eriksdotter (Vasa)
Catherine of Sweden
Frederick III, Elector Palatine
Louis VI, Elector Palatine
Marie of Brandenburg-Kulmbach
Maria of the Palatinate-Simmern
Philip I, Landgrave of Hesse
Elisabeth of Hesse
Christine of Saxony

== Sources ==
- Historiesajten (in Swedish)
- Anteckningar om svenska qvinnor (in Swedish)
- Rodén, Marie-Louise (2008). Drottning Christina. (in Swedish)
- Nordisk familjebok (in Swedish)
- Kromnow, Åke (1975–1977). "Katarina". Svenskt biografiskt lexikon (in Swedish). Vol. 21. National Archives of Sweden. p. 1. Archived from the original on 2023-04-18.
