= Stegeborg Castle =

Swedish ruined castle

- St Anna parish, Söderköping, Östergötland
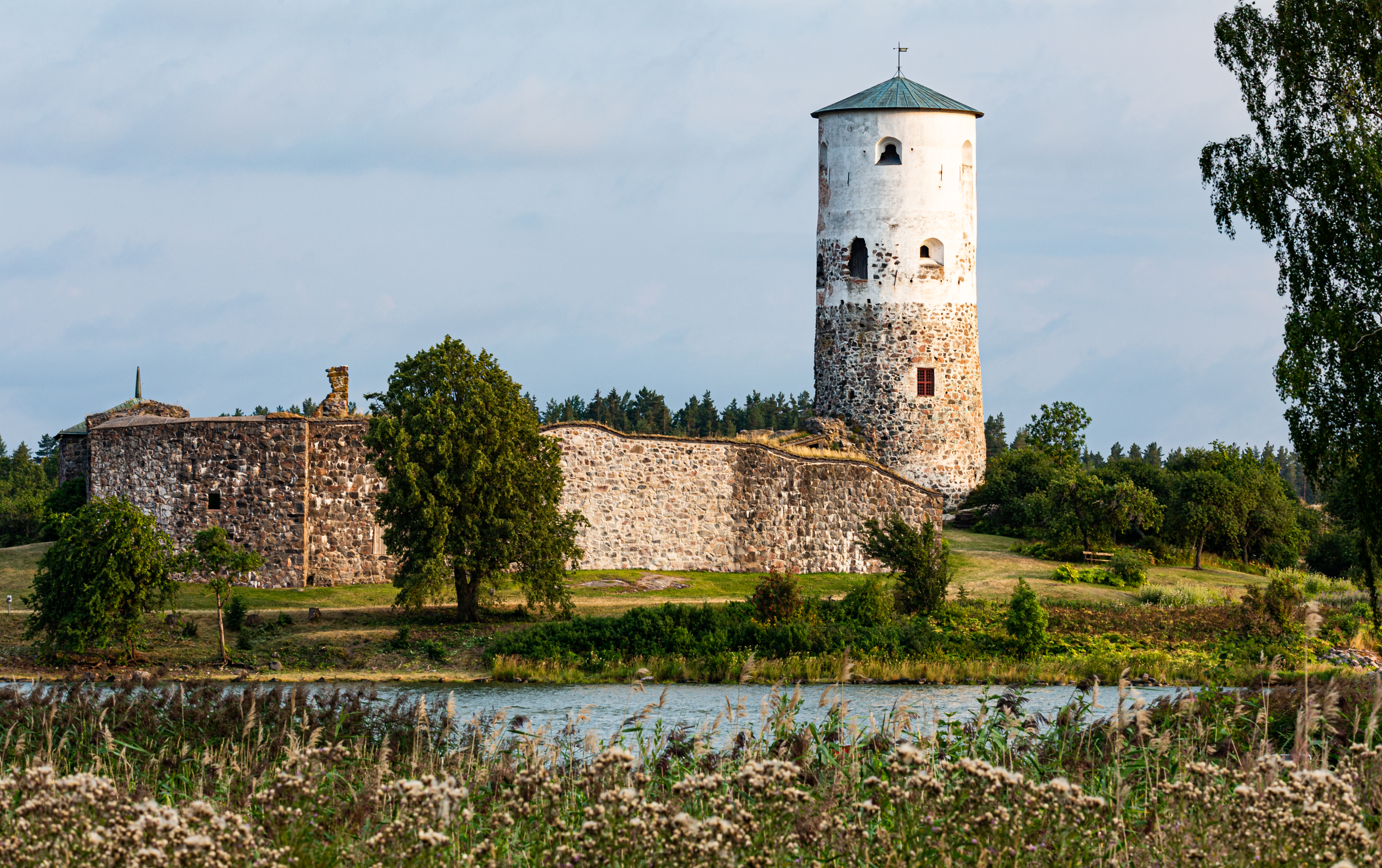
- Stegeborg castle ruins by the bay Slätbaken.

Site information
- Condition: Ruined

Location
- Coordinates: 58°26′30″N 16°35′54″E

Stegeborg Castle is a ruined castle in St Anna parish, Söderköping, Östergötland, located on an island in a narrow sound at the bay of Slätbaken, Sweden.

== Brief history ==
The oldest part of the castle is a square brick tower in the southeast corner, built in the early 13th century, when Söderköping became a city. A simple fortified residence was added during the 14th century, expanded and supplemented by a wall and a round tower in the west. During the 16th and 17th centuries the building was further expanded, especially during the reign of John III of Sweden, when the round tower attained its present height. In addition, a castle church was added to the north wing. Several of the Vasa kings lived in Stegeborg, which was allotted 1652–1689 to the Palatine counts John Casimir (died 1652) and Adolph John. The crown sold the castle in the 1730s for building materials. The bottom floor's large masonry protected it against complete destruction. Until 1689 the castle was the center of the Östergötland archipelago's local government. The new palace, a whitewashed three-storey building in neoclassical style, located at the former southern royal farm, was built in 1806.

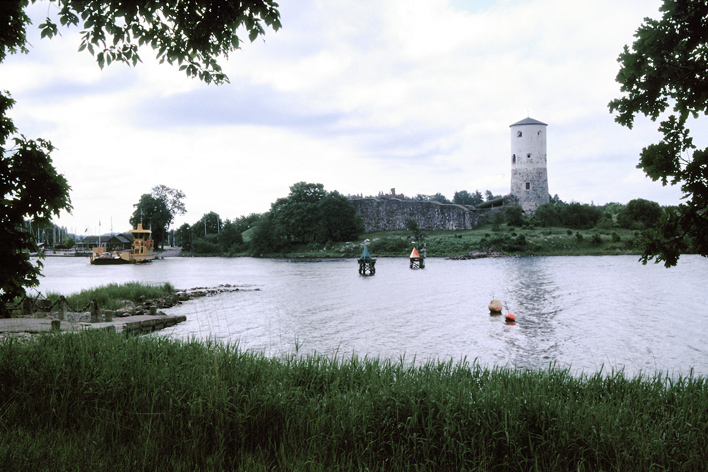
Stegeborg at the bay of Slätbaken.

== Name and history ==
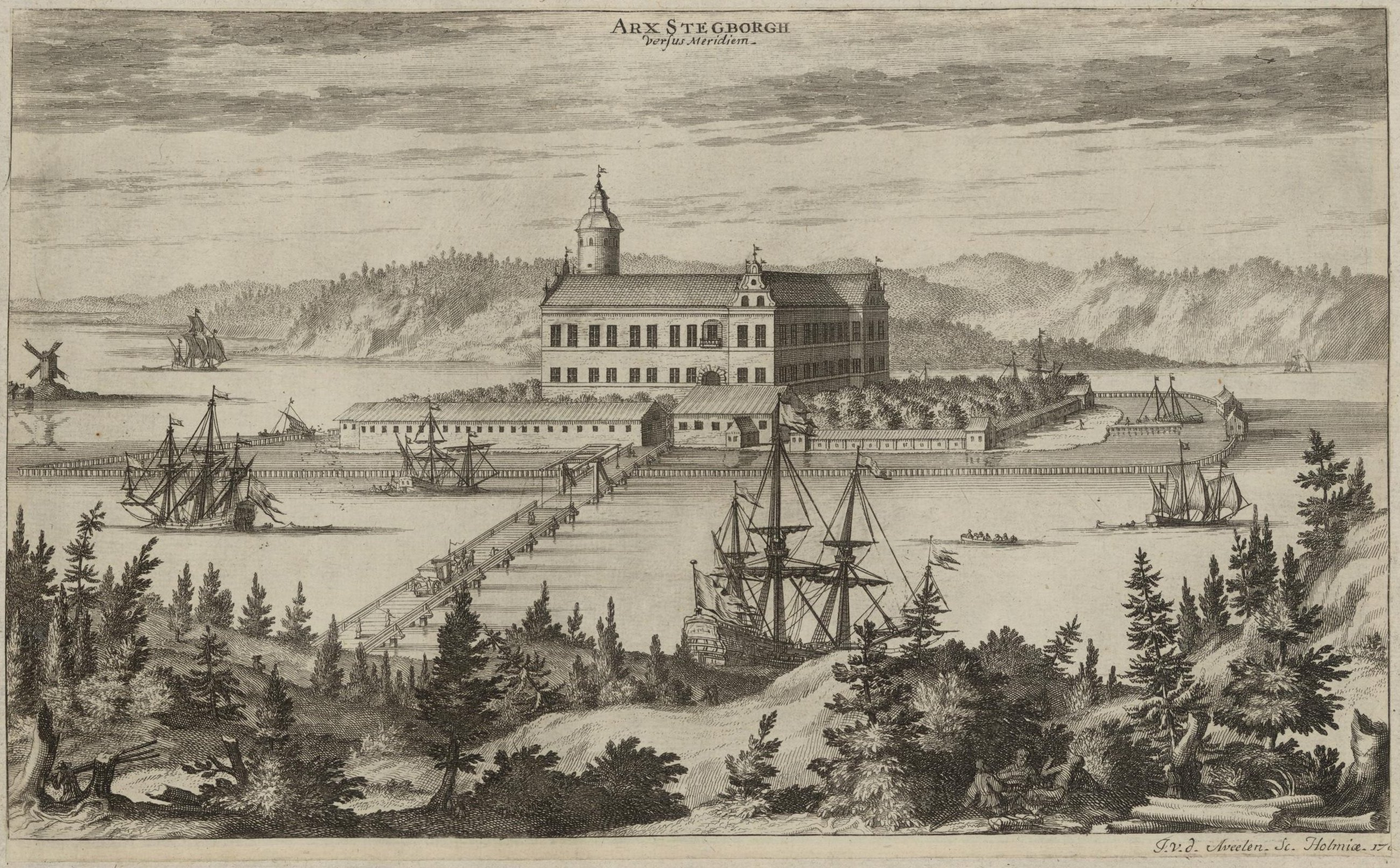
Stegeborg Castle in Suecia Antiqua et Hodierna, 1706. The image is not entirely reliable, but these pictures are the only ones depicting how the castle may have looked like before the demolition. The tower is also similar to that which remains today and the proportions are not too implausible.

=== Name ===
The castle is mentioned in 1310 as Stækaborg: the name comes from stæk, mediaeval Swedish for stock, pile, or the other place name Stäket. "Stäk" refers to several systems of pilings - stakes - submerged in the water which blocked the channel. The oldest of these systems has been dated between the 7th and 9th century. Pilings dating back to the 11th century have been discovered in the waters north of the island. The purpose of the piling barriers was to prevent or hinder shipping. These pilings were still extant in the 19th century, and therefore vessels had to pass the island on the south side to reach Söderköping.

=== Folkung period ===
The early history of Stegeborg is tied with the estate of Skällsvik. A farm is attested as early as 1287, when it belonged to the Bishop of Linköping, Benedict Birgersson.

His successor Lars Albrektsson kept the property. Its strategic location at the entrance to Söderköping, at the time one of the country's wealthiest cities, was obvious to Birger Magnusson's guardianship, which was led by the marsk Torkel Knutsson. In 1305 at the latest the bishop's farm was sold to king Birger.

Subsequently, a castle was built on the islet, which is in the sea channel leading toward Söderköping. Its appearance and extent are unknown. The edifice was probably not too extensive, as the island is currently not large and post-glacial isostatic rebound in Östergötland has resulted in land elevation of two meters since the 14th century.

During the period 1310–1316 the king sent several letters from Stegeborg and one can assume that he remained there for long periods. After the Nyköping Banquet a rebellion broke out against King Birger. He left Stegeborg and sailed to Visby, but left his son Magnus Birgersson as commander of Stegeborg. The castle was besieged, presumably from Easter until the end of August 1318. Magnus was taken prisoner to Stockholm and was sentenced to death in June 1320. He is buried in Riddarholmskyrkan in Stockholm next to King Magnus Ladulås. According to the Erik's Chronicle Stegeborg was demolished after the capitulation.

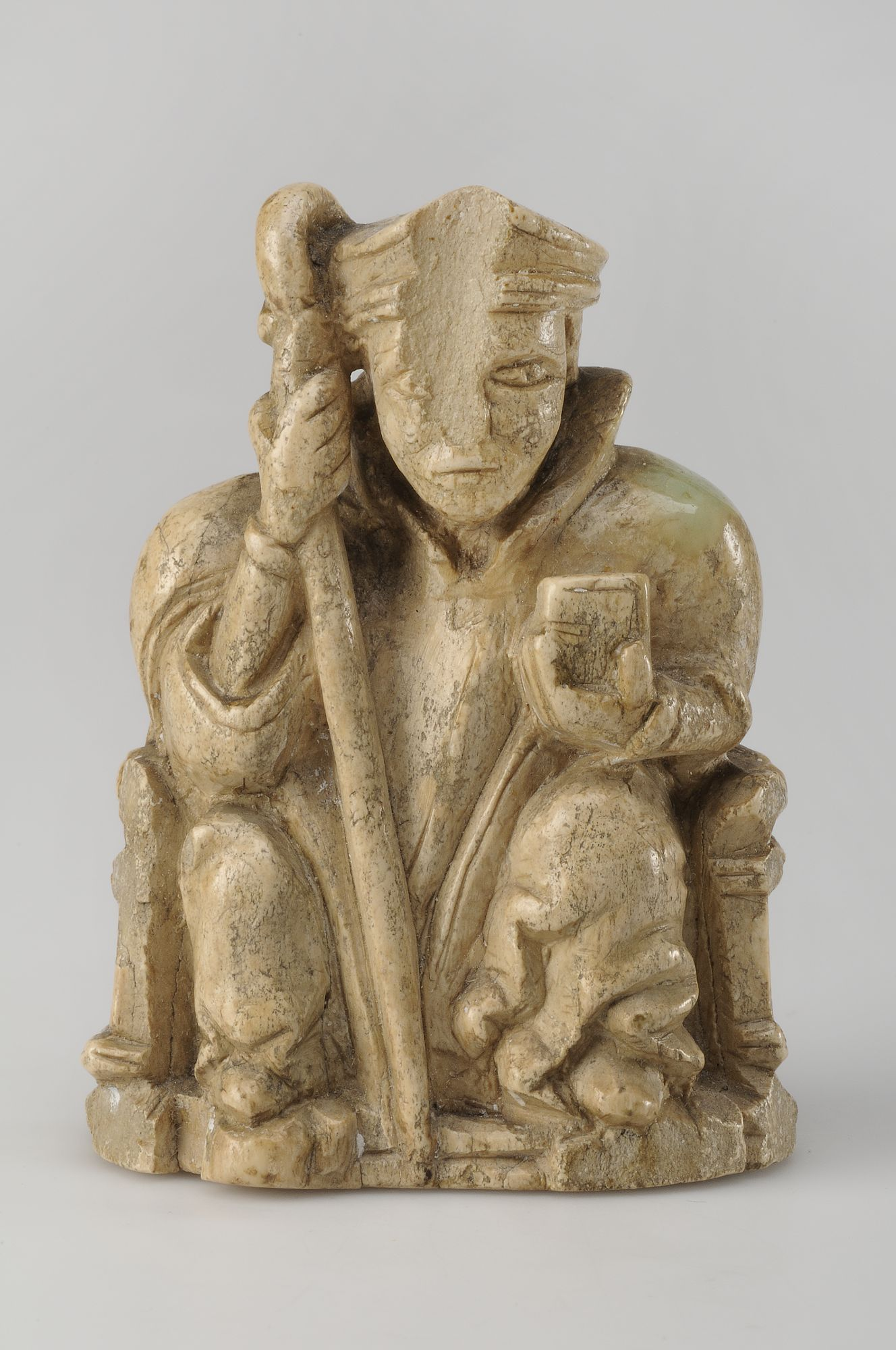
13th-century walrus ivory chess bishop found at the castle

Karl Bååt, bishop of Linköping, sought to reacquire the Skällsvik farm for the diocese. He was able to receive Skällsvik and the castle ruins as a gift from Duke Erik's widow Ingeborg of Norway on January 27, 1321. Karl then spent a lot of money rebuilding the estate.

However, in 1332 the bishop was forced to yield the estate to King Magnus in exchange for properties on Visingsö. The reason was probably the site's strategic location and the possibility of raising the tariff on ships on the way to Söderköping. An economic crisis, however, forced the king to pawn the castle in 1336. To whom is unknown, but in 1350 Skällsvik was again property of the church. On February 28, 1350 the bishop of Linköping Peter Tyrgilsson signed a letter at the manor (in manerio nostro Skældowijk).

During the dynastic conflicts between King Magnus and Erik Magnusson in the 1350s, Skällvik manor was held by bishop Nils Markusson. The bishop had taken sides with Erik, and in 1356 the manor was attacked and badly damaged; it is likely that this was on the order of the king. How much was destroyed is unknown, but when Duke Albert of Mecklenburg attacked Sweden in 1363, even Söderköping was attacked, indicating that Albert's fleet had been able to pass Skällvik unhindered. What is clear is that the Skällsvik manor disappeared and that someone rebuilt Stegeborg on the island in the channel. One guess is that Albert, who rebuilt both Nyköping Castle and Stäkeholm, also rebuilt Stegeborg.

=== Kalmar Union era ===
In 1391 Stegeborg was owned by the Crown, and Margaret had appointed the Danish knight Evert Moltke as sheriff. The diocese complained that he forced the peasants to pay additional taxes, despite crop failures. On Midsummer's Day 1394 Söderköping was attacked by the Victual Brothers. These pirates attacked with a large force and apparently passed Stegeborg without being stopped.

A few years later, Moltke was transferred and Esbjörn Krisiernsson Djäkn became the new sheriff. In the diary of Vadstena Abbey he was called a disgusting tyrant. In 1414 Jöns Fridfinnsson became sheriff. He had been sheriff at Västerås Castle, where the populace had complained to the king about his abuses. Almost nothing is known about his behaviour at Stegeborg.

When King Erik in the 1420s made a pilgrimage to Jerusalem, he met in Budapest the Croatian Count Ivan Anz Frankopan, who followed the king to Jerusalem as an interpreter and was there was appointed Knight of the Holy Sepulchre. At the end of the decade, he was appointed sheriff in Stegeborg. His name has been swedified to Johan Vale or Johan Franco. In Engelbrecht rebellion Stegeborg was captured in 1434 after a brief siege.

The bishop in Linköping Knut Bosson (Natt och Dag) became the new steward. After the 1436 meeting of the Council of the Realm in Söderköping, Nils Stensson (Natt och Dag) was appointed. In 1438 Karl Knutsson (Bonde) had been appointed regent and demanded that Nils yield Stegeborg to him. Nils refused and began a siege in February 1439. In July it was agreed that Nils would voluntarily yield the castle in September unless King Eric sent some relief. King Eric came to Stegeborg during the summer to summon the Privy Council. Karl Knutsson and Eric's negotiators met in Arkösund but no agreement was reached. In late August, Eric returned to Gotland and in the autumn Stegeborg was handed to the Privy Council. The new sheriff was Erengisle Nilsson the younger (Hammerstaätten).

Erengisle seems to have been friendly to the Kalmar Union but was fired as sheriff in 1463 when the king suspected him of sympathizing with Karl Knutsson. The house of Oxenstierna was also supportive of the Union, and the new sheriff was Erik Nilsson (Oxenstierna). However, the Oxenstierna family lost power in Sweden in 1467 and in their stead Ivar Axelsson (Tott) was appointed as steward instead, by his brother, who was regent. Ivar was married to Karl Knutsson's daughter Magdalena of Sweden, which meant a change of allegiance to the group that opposed the Union. By order of the Privy Council on 25 May 1472, he was granted Stegeholm Castle and county as a life fiefdom.

Ivar had his home in Visborg Castle on Gotland but nonetheless made major alterations to Stegeborg. Among other things, a new wall was built and the round tower which still stands.

Ivar Axelsson owned seven vessels engaged in piracy on the Baltic Sea and this pastime led to an inevitable conflict with the Privy Council. When discussions led nowhere a military operation against Ivar Axel's Castle was launched. In February 1487 a siege of the castle began and on 14 May 1487 the steward Erland Kagge was forced to capitulate.

On September 3 the same year was appointed Privy Council and the Judge Gregers Matsson (Lillie) to new slottshövitsman. From his time the accounts for 1487-1492 are preserved.

After Gregers, several people had command of the castle but only for short periods: Privy Councilman Arvid Trolle, Knight Nils Bosson (Sture) and Knight Erik Turesson (Bielke).

In the summer of 1499 John I appointed Svante Nilsson (Sture) to new owners in the fief of Stegeborg. Svante had wanted to succeed his father Nils Bosson, but had been passed over by Sten Sture. Now Castle County had diminished and no longer received revenues from the cities of Söderköping and Norrköping.

After many years of service in Rome Hemming Gadh returned to Sweden and became a Bishop of Linköping in January 1501. Surviving correspondence reveals that Hemming was a frequent guest at Stegeborg. During the summer of 1501 a rebellion broke out against King Hans. In August, three of the king's 14 ships attempted to enter Slätbaken and conquer Stegeborg but the landing attempt failed.

After the death of Sten Sture, Svante Nilsson was elected on January 21, 1504, to the regency. It was probably not until 1506 before the Privy Council Trotte Månsson (Eka) was appointed the new castle bailiff. Trotte was faithful to Svante Nilsson and remained sheriff until his death in 1512.

Holger Karlsson Gera was appointed the fiefdome in 1513. Holger's wife was a cousin of Archbishop Gustav Trolle, which probably was a burden on him in Sture party. In June 1517 the Danish navy managed to burn Söderköping despite Stegeborg blocking the entrance. It is likely, though, that the fleet entered the Bråviken and then landed a military force.

1518 Stegeborg got a new commander, the Privy Council Erik Ryning. In the summer of 1520 he defeated a Danish force that protected the manor outside the Bishop of Linköping. This eventually led to accusations from both bishop Brask and Nils Bosson (Grip) and he was one of those beheaded at Stockholm Bloodbath 1520th.

=== Vasa and Palatine dynasties ===
During the Dacke Feud the castle was attacked but never captured. The castle was renovated in the 1540s. Esbjörn Pedersson Lilliehöök was the bailiff of Stegeborg between 1555–1560.

King John III of Sweden was born and raised in the castle and in 1578 he decided on the continuation of construction on the castle. This castle became more of a Renaissance palace than a medieval castle. Work continued until 1590.

In 1622 the castle was conferred, along with some hundreds (härader) to Gustav II Adolf's brother-in-law John Casimir of Pfalz-Zweibrücken, who in 1651 was entitled Duke of Stegeborg. After John Casimir's death in 1652 the ducal title passed on to the eldest living son, Karl Gustav. Two years later Karl Gustav's succeeded his cousin Queen Christina and became King Charles X Gustav of Sweden, whereupon the ducal title was transferred to Karl Gustav's younger brother Adolph John, who then resided in the castle until his death in 1689. After his death the castle reverted to the crown.

=== 18th and 19th centuries ===
The governor of Östergötland tried to keep the castle in a satisfactory condition but could not prevent its dilapidation. In 1707 the castle was examined by the commission to decide what to do. The proposed repairs would have been very expensive. The following year all the wooden buildings on the island were auctioned off. Governor Erik Ehrenkrona proposed in the 1720s that three of the four barracks would be demolished and the fourth re-equipped. On behalf of the Legal, Financial and Administrative Services Agency the castle was examined in 1728 but the governor's proposal was rejected. Much of the castle was demolished in the summer of 1731 and the material used in Norrköping.

Jacob von Hökerstedt bought 1731 Southern Kungsladugården, which took over the name Stegeborg. Due to poor finances, the property was transferred to the bank Rikets städer. The next owners were the von Schwerins (1739–1863).

=== 20th century ===
Stegeborg was protected in 1901. In 1938 the Swedish National Heritage Board received a small sum to clear the location of trees and shrubs and the most severely damaged parts of the masonry were repaired. During the years 1948–1955 the heritage board was assisted by national servicemen to excavate the ruins, repair the worst damage and raise protective roofing over certain parts.

== New main building ==
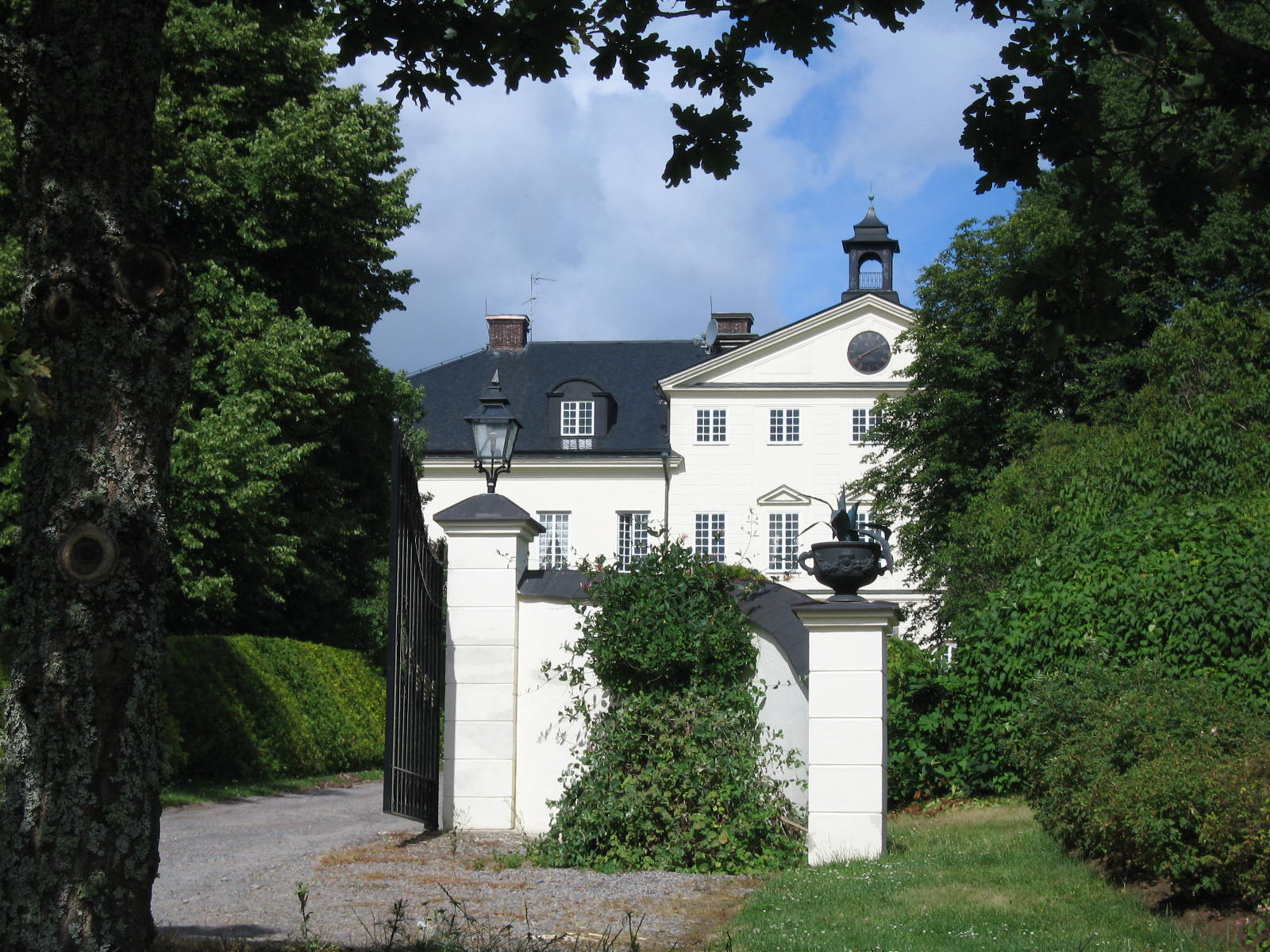
The new main building

The new main building (a private residence) is a palace, not a castle, and was completed in 1806, by the developer Werner Detloff von Schwerin. The arched lower floor suggest that parts of an old manor house from the 1730s may have been used. Stone from Stegeborg probably used in the old building.

The palace got its present appearance, however, with the extensive renovations of 1915–1918, for Captain Hakon Wijk to designs by architect Isak Gustaf Clason.

The main facade (to the east) received a window shade on either side, a middle section and a lantern, a garden facade was narrower trimmed hood (which includes the three middle windows) window and two cups on each side. Putsornamentiken changed and became more uniform, black-glazed roof tiles were retained (now slate). The plaster was originally beige, but is now off-white.

Inside the palace received a partial change of floorplan. The ground floor, formerly storage space, received an entirely new set of library furnishings, men's dining room and pantries in the eastern facade and rooms and servants' dining room with kitchen area to the west. The main entrance leads into the hall which has a double staircase to the upper hall. The parade floor has among other things two lounges and bedrooms to the east. The third floor has a billiard room in the place that previously housed the Schwerinska Library (now in Thorönsborg).

A reflecting pool was built in front of the palace (today filled in) and a large orchard was designed by Danish landscape architect I. P. Andersen. The gardener's house (now a hotel) and a number of residential buildings was also built according to plans by Clason. A stable was designed by Clason but was never built.

== Stegeborg today ==
Stegeborg is owned today (2010) by the Danielsson family who operate a major tourist activity in the yard. An airfield was built in the Skällsvik meadow, where the Battle of Stegeborg was fought. The castle ruins are now also a port tavern and a marina.

== Notable births at the castle ==
- December 21, 1537: John III
- November 9, 1539: Magdalena Svantesdotter Sture
- 17 May 1568: Anna Vasa of Sweden
- February 5 1625: Maria Eufrosyne of Zweibrücken
- October 11, 1629: Adolph John I, Count Palatine of Kleeburg
