= Jäder Church =

Coordinates: 59°24′35″N 16°41′28″E

- Jäders kyrka
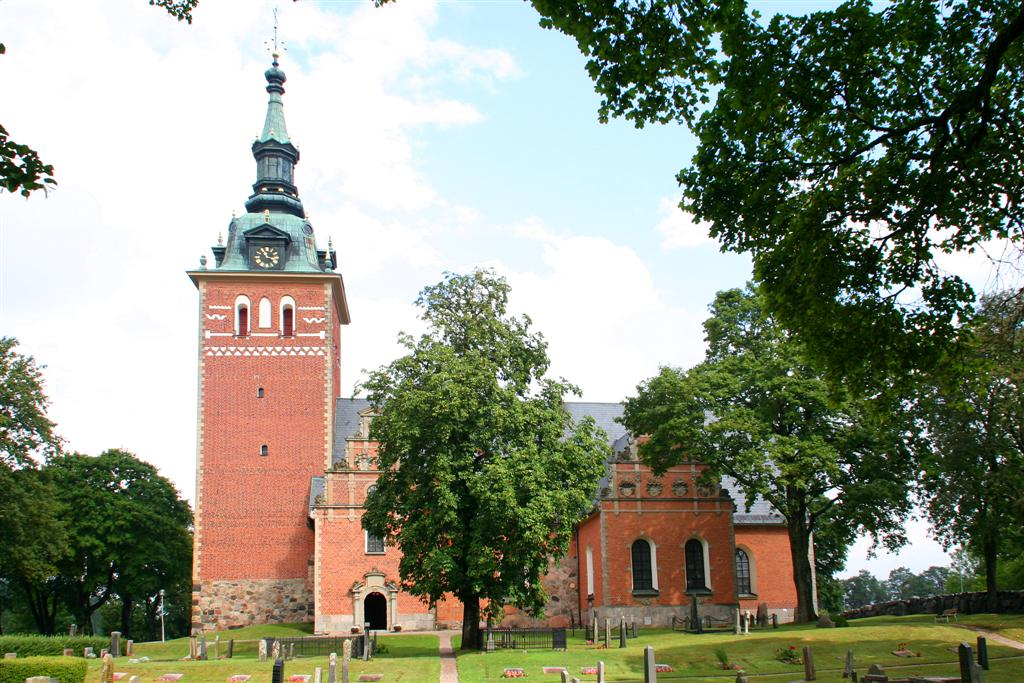
- Jäder Church, view from the south.
- Jäder Church
- Location: Jäder, Eskilstuna Municipality, Södermanland County
- Country: Sweden
- Denomination: Church of Sweden (Evangelical Lutheran)
- Previous denomination: Roman Catholic (pre-reformation)

History
- Status: Subsidiary parish church
- Consecrated: 12th Century

Architecture
- Architectural type: Renaissance

Administration
- Diocese: Strängnäs
- Deanery: Rekarne
- Parish: Kafjärden

Jäder Church, Swedish: Jäders kyrka, is a church building in the village of Jäder, Eskilstuna Municipality, Södermanland County, Sweden, approximately 10 km east of Eskilstuna. Belonging to the Lutheran Church of Sweden, it is part of Kafjärden Parish in the Diocese of Strängnäs. Until 1995, it was the main church of the historical Jäder Parish.

== Architecture ==
Jäder Church is a significant work of Swedish renaissance architecture, and is sometimes locally jokingly referred to as Rekarne domkyrka, "Rekarne Cathedral", owing to its unusually large size for a village church and extensive renaissance decorations. The church is situated on a hill surrounded by fields and built in stone and brick. It consists of a western nave, a choir of similar dimensions in the east, a sacristy to the north, the Brahe burial chapel opposite the sacristy to the south, a church porch and a western tower. The burial chapel and the sacristy form the arms of a latin cross. The walls have pointed arched windows, and the gabled roof is covered in roof slate. The western tower is crowned by a multi-levelled Neo-Renaissance spire.

The exterior is mainly characterised by the brick walls and mid-17th century ornamental sandstone decorations on the gables.

== Interior ==
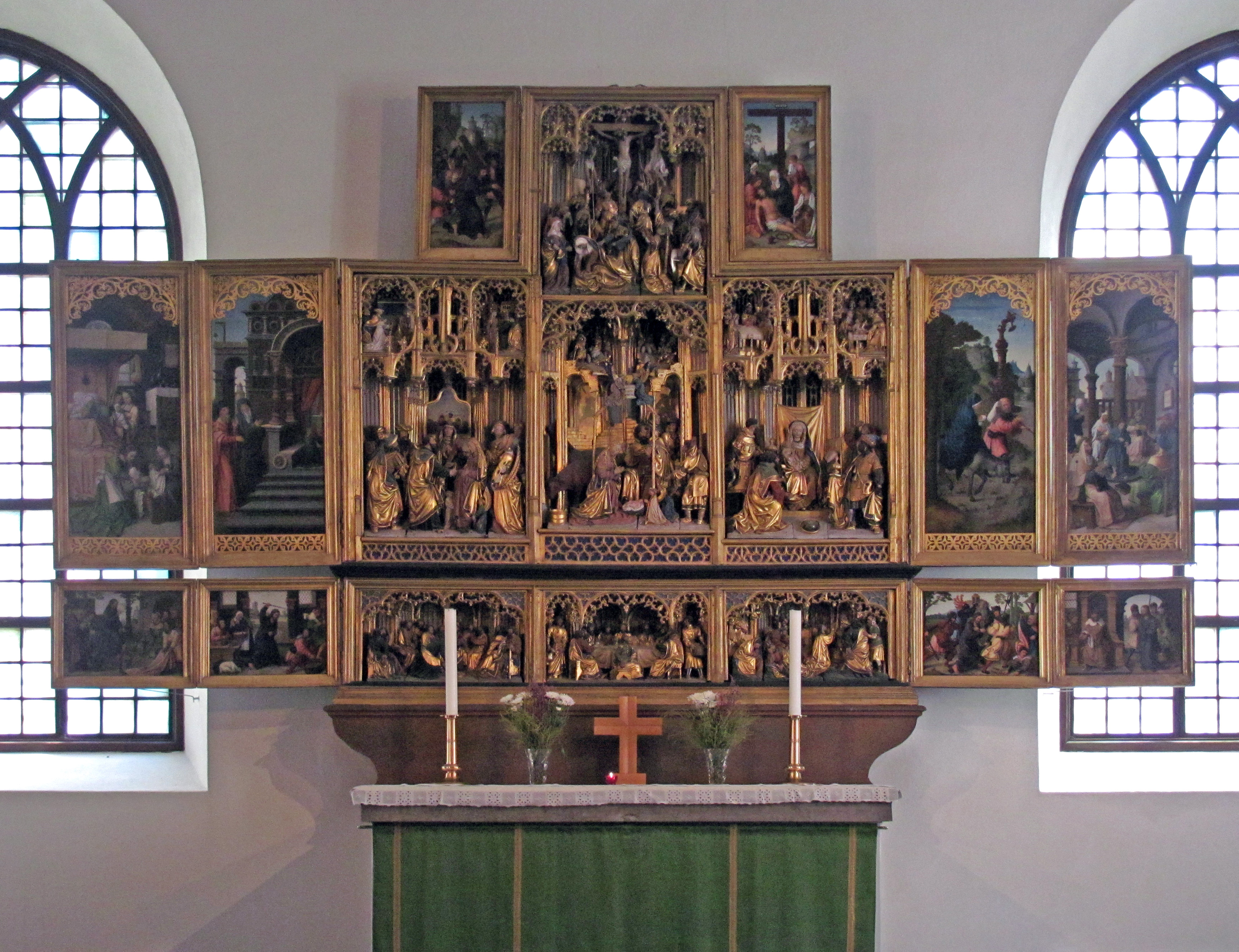
Altarpiece by Jan Borman and Jan van Coninxlo.

The white-washed walls and vaults give the church interior a largely uniform appearance, although the vaults range in age from the late Middle Ages to the 17th century. The choir has more marked gothic influences. There are several epitaphs for local nobility created in the 17th century by Heinrich Wilhelm. The late Gothic winged altarpiece in Brabant style was originally commissioned for Storkyrkan in Stockholm and is one of the foremost examples of this altarpiece style in Sweden, built 1514 in Jan Borman's workshop in Brussels and painted by Jan van Coninxlo the Younger.

== History ==
The northern wall incorporates parts of a Romanesque 12th century church which was expanded upon during the second half of the 13th century, likely using an aisleless design, with the original medieval porch and sacristy. The tower and vaults were added during the 15th century.

During the patronship of Lord High Chancellor Axel Oxenstierna the church was significantly expanded upon and rebuilt, in order to serve as the burial church of the Chancellor and his family. The choir with the Oxenstierna burial vault was rebuilt between 1641 and 1643. In 1651–1652 the present sacristy and porches were added and the Brahe burial chapel was finished in 1659 to mirror the sacristy. The spire has been replaced several times over the course of the history of the church. The present spire was designed in Neo-Renaissance style by Helgo Zettervall and finished in 1880.

== Burials ==
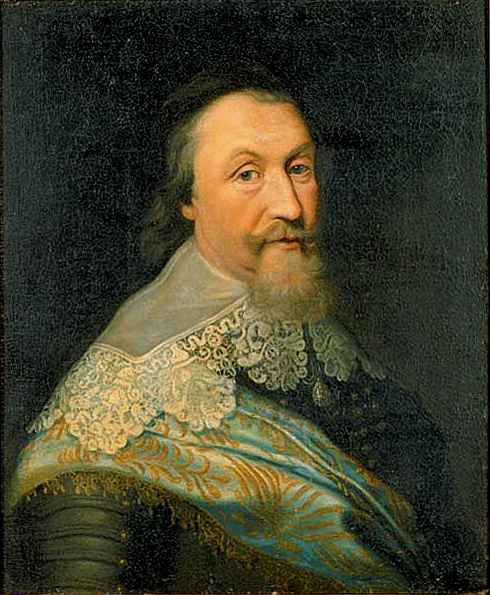
Axel Gustafsson Oxenstierna (1583-1654)

Jäder Church was used by the influential Oxenstierna family of nearby Fiholm Castle as a burial church for several generations, and owes it present renaissance appearance mainly to the Swedish statesman Axel Oxenstierna, who commissioned the extensive mid-17th century additions to the church. The Brahe burial chapel and vault was commissioned by Margareta Brahe for the remains of her two first husbands, Bengt Bengtsson Oxenstierna and Johan Oxenstierna, and finished in 1659.

- Anna Åkesdotter Bååt (1579-1649), Countess of Södermöre and wife to Axel Gustafsson Oxenstierna, Maid of honour to Dowager Queen Catherine Stenbock.
- Axel Gustafsson Oxenstierna af Södermöre (1583-1654), Count of Södermöre, Privy Councillor and statesman, Lord High Chancellor of Sweden 1612-1654
- Axel Eriksson Oxenstierna af Södermöre (1652-1676), Count of Södermöre
- Bengt Bengtsson Oxenstierna af Eka och Lindö (1591-1643), Privy Councillor and diplomat, Governor-General of Ingria and Livonia
- Carl Gustaf Oxenstierna af Södermöre (1655-1686), Count of Södermöre, diplomat
- Erik Axelsson Oxenstierna af Södermöre (1624-1656), Count of Södermöre, Privy Councillor and statesman, Lord High Chancellor of Sweden 1654-1656
- Johan Oxenstierna af Södermöre (1611–1657), Count of Södermöre, Privy Councillor and statesman, Lord Marshal of the Realm
- Clas Tott (1630-1674), Count of Karleborg, Field Marshal, Privy Councillor, Governor-General of Livonia
