= Bengt Bengtsson Oxenstierna =

Swedish diplomat and noble

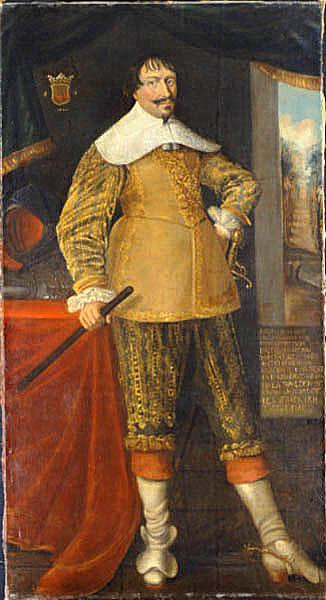
Bengt Bengtsson Oxenstierna

Bengt Bengtsson Oxenstierna af Eka och Lindö, Baron of Eka and Lindö (1591–1643), in non-contemporary sources sometimes referred to as Resare-Bengt (Bengt the Traveller), was a Swedish diplomat and noble, Swedish Privy Councillor, and Governor-General of Ingria and Livonia. He is mainly known for his extensive travels, as he was one of the few Swedish contemporaries who travelled to Persia, Palestine and Egypt.

== Biography ==
Bengt Bengtsson (Note: Bengtsson is a patronymic rather than a family name.) was born 1591 at Frösvik near Rydbo. Bengt Bengtsson was a member of the influential Oxenstierna family and was born in 1591 to Bengt Gabrielsson Oxenstierna the Elder, councillor to Charles, Duke of Södermanland, Närke and Värmland (later King Charles IX), and his second wife Brita Posse.

As was customary in the Oxenstierna family, he was educated abroad and spent the years 1607–1613 travelling the European continent, studying at the German universities of Rostock, Jena and Wittenberg and visiting Poland and Italy. He visited Palestine in 1613 but was robbed and returned impoverished to Italy, where he entered the service of the Grand Duke of Tuscany, Cosimo II de' Medici.

In 1616 he travelled to the Middle East again, through Asia Minor to Aleppo, Baghdad and Isfahan, making him the first Swede known to have visited Safavid Persia. He entered the service of Shah Abbas I for a time. From there, he continued to Hormuz, seeking passage to India, but was forced to return to Isfahan by way of Shiraz. After travelling back through Baghdad, Aleppo, Palestine and Egypt, he reached Venice in 1619 and returned to Sweden in 1620.

On his return he entered royal service and was sent on a diplomatic mission to the Venetian Republic in 1621. During the 1620s, he followed King Gustavus Adolphus in the field, served under his cousin Governor-General Axel Oxenstierna in the Swedish administration in Prussia, e.g. as Governor of Elbląg in 1626, or was sent on diplomatic missions.

He was named Crown Equerry in 1627 and was appointed Governor of Swedish occupied Augsburg in 1632–33. In 1631, he headed diplomatic missions as extraordinary ambassador to France and the Netherlands. In 1634 he was appointed Governor-General of Swedish Livonia and Ingria and Master of Horse of the Realm, and was appointed to the Privy Council of Sweden alongside several of his Oxenstierna relatives in 1641. Oxenstierna died without issue in Riga, Swedish Livonia, in 1643.

== Family and personal life ==
The Oxenstierna family occupied many of the highest offices of the state during the reign of Gustavus Adolphus and Queen Christina's minority. Other well-known members of the same generation of the family included his older half-brother Gabriel Bengtsson, Lord High Treasurer of Sweden, and his cousins, Axel Gustafsson, Lord High Chancellor, and Gabriel Gustafsson, Lord High Steward.

Oxenstierna married Margareta Brahe in 1633, in her first marriage, which remained childless at the time of his death in 1643. His widow commissioned his final resting place, the Brahe burial chapel of Jäder Church east of Eskilstuna.

According to contemporary sources, Oxenstierna was able to talk, read and write in Swedish, Latin, French, German, Italian and Spanish and also spoke some Persian and Turkish.

== Legacy ==
The 20th century Swedish explorer and geographer Sven Hedin wrote a biography on Oxenstierna in 1918, popularising the moniker "Resare-Bengt", which however is posthumous and only recorded since the late 18th century.
