= Caroline Ridderstolpe =

Swedish composer and singer

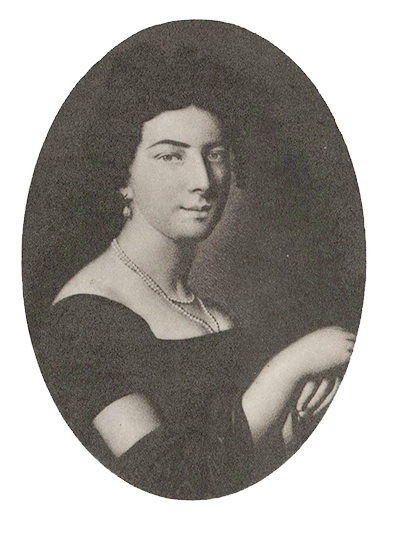
Caroline Ridderstolpe 1815

Caroline Johanna Lovisa Ridderstolpe, née Kolbe (2 September 1793 – 8 October 1878) was a Swedish composer and singer. She was an honorary member of the Royal Swedish Academy of Music. She was also a lady-in-waiting at court.

== Life ==
Ridderstolpe was born in Berlin, the daughter of the chapel conductor, Carl Kolbe. Her parents were Louise Requigny, a lady-in-waiting, and Carl Kolbe, a kapellmeister. She was taught music by her father, learning to sing and to play several musical instruments. She may also have studied composition with composer Carl Maria von Weber. In 1816 married the Swedish governor, count Fredrik Ludvig Ridderstolpe, and the couple had two children. The family lived at Tidö Castle.

In 1832, she published the composition Sju Sånger (Seven Songs), dedicated to the Crown princess Josephine of Leuchtenberg. In 1834, Hvad är Glädjen? (What is Joy?) was published, dedicated to her late friend Josefina Benedicks, and in 1836 Nya Sånger (New Songs). In total six collections of songs and some piano pieces are known from Ridderstolpe.

In 1844, Ridderstolpe became involved in the De la Croix’ salon at Brunkebergstorg, which attracted criticism from other ladies-in-waiting who thought the public nature of the salon to be inappropriate.

Caroline Ridderstolpe was inducted as an honorary member of the Royal Swedish Academy of Music (chair 322) on March 26, 1850. She was widowed in 1852, although lived separately to her husband for several years prior to his death. Ridderstolpe died in 1878 at Fiholm Castle in Västmanland.

Aurora von Qvanten published a biography of Ridderstolpe under the pseudonym Turdus Merula (the Latin name of the blackbird).
