= Tidö Castle =

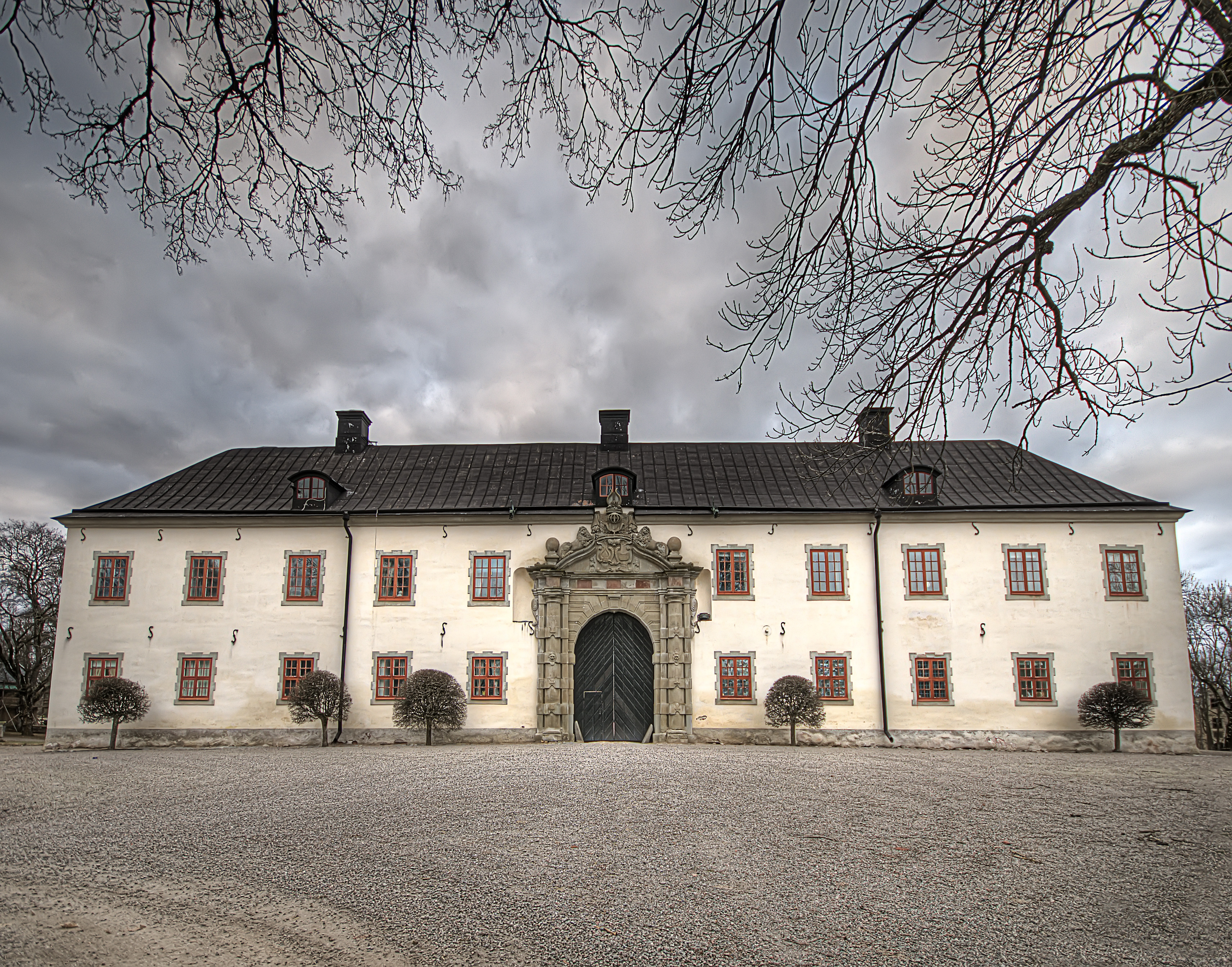
- Interactive map of the Tidö Castle area

General information
- Location: Västerås Municipality, Sweden
- Construction started: 1625
- Completed: 1645

Tidö Castle (Swedish: Tidö slott) is a castle located 17 km (11 mi) south of Västerås in Västmanland, Sweden.

== History ==
=== The former castle ===
The first building on the site was a medieval house built by the Gren family in the fifteenth century. In 1537, the Gren family sold the castle to the Queen Consort, Margaret Leijonhufvud (1516–1551). In 1540, her husband, King Gustav Vasa, traded the castle to Ekolsund Castle and Tidö came to the Tott family. Today, minor ruins of the former house can be found next to the present building.

=== The present castle ===
The present castle at Tidö was built by the influential statesman and Lord High Chancellor Axel Oxenstierna in 1625–1645. The castle was built around a rectangular courtyard with the main building to the north and the three linked wings to the east, west and south. The main entrance is through a vault in the south wing.

In 1889, the von Schinkel family bought Tidö and they still own it today. Tidö is one of Sweden's best preserved Baroque palaces, in the Dutch Renaissance style. In 1974, the toy collector Carl-David von Schinkel opened a toy museum at Tidö, with a large collection of historical toys, including toys formerly owned by the royal family. After a merger with the Seriemuseet collection in 2010, when the museum was moved out of the castle to the adjacent stables, the museum operated as Tidö leksaks- och seriemuseum. The entire collection moved to Stockholm in 2017 and today forms the core of the museum Stockholm Toy Museum on Skeppsholmen in Stockholm.

Following the 2022 Swedish general election the leaders of the 4 right-wing parties, Ebba Busch from the Christian Democrats, Johan Pehrson from the Liberals, Ulf Kristersson from the Moderate Party, and Jimmie Åkesson from the Sweden Democrats gathered at the castle to negotiate the Tidö Agreement. This agreement allowed Moderate Party leader Ulf Kristersson to form a right-wing government with the Christian Democrats and Liberals, supported by the Sweden Democrats. After this, media and debaters have included "Tidö" in names for this group of parties, such as "Tidö parties".

== See also ==
- List of castles and palaces in Sweden
- Tidö Agreement
