= Church of the Teutonic Order, Vienna =

German-based Roman Catholic religious order

Church of the Teutonic Order
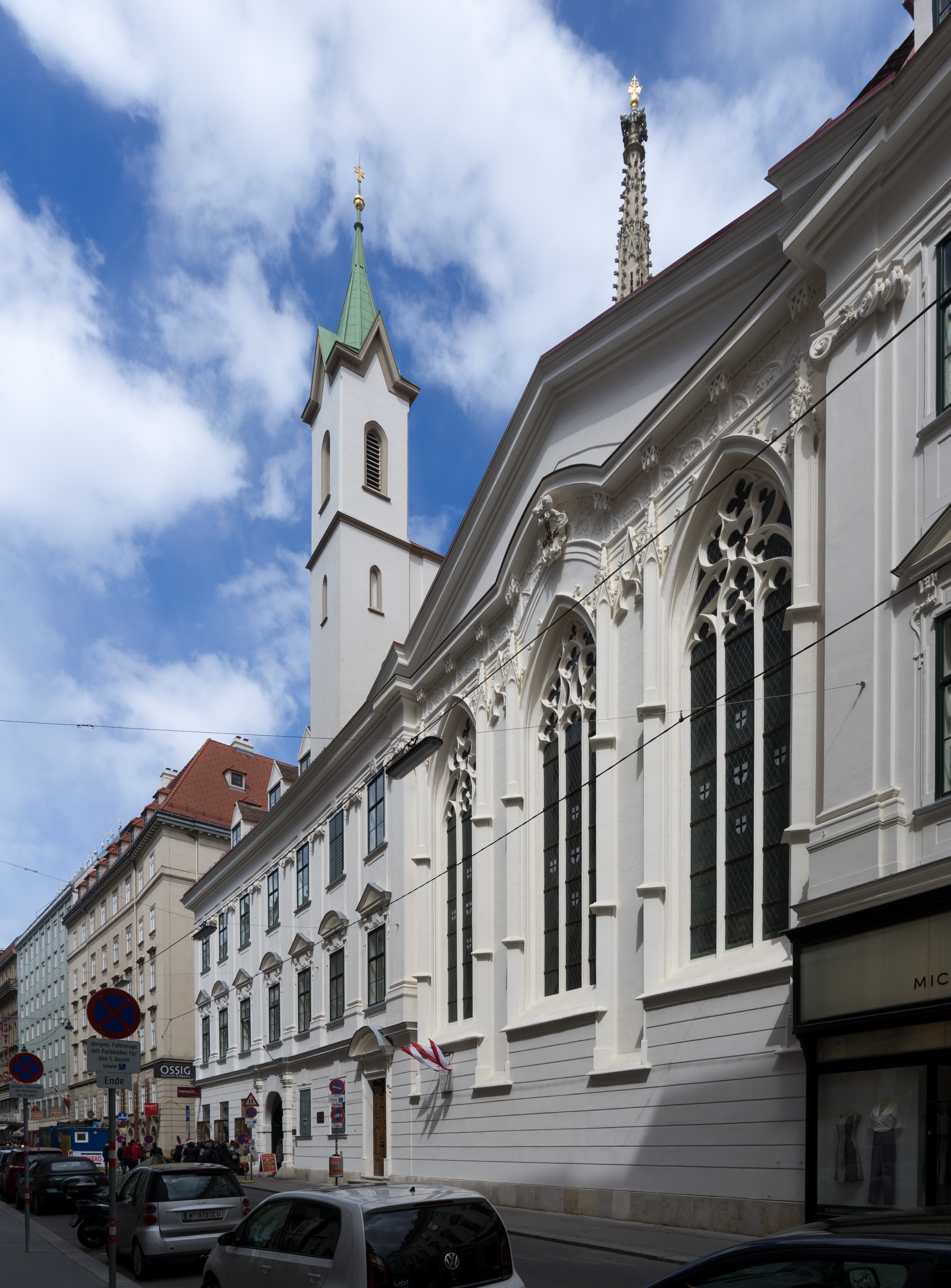

Religion
- Affiliation: Catholic Church
- Leadership: P. Johannes Kellner

Location
- Location: Vienna, Austria
- Interactive map of Church of the Teutonic Order
- Coordinates: 48°12′27.2″N 16°22′22.7″E

Architecture
- Type: Church
- Style: Gothic, Baroque
- Groundbreaking: 1326
- Completed: 1375

Specifications
- Direction of façade: SSW
- Capacity: 150
- Length: 25 m
- Width: 10 m

Website
- Official Website

Map of the preceptory and church of the Teutonic Order

The Church of the Teutonic Order (German: Deutschordenskirche), also known as the Church of Saint Elisabeth of Hungary (German: Hl. Elisabeth von Ungarn), is the mother church of the Teutonic Order, a German-based Roman Catholic religious order formed at the end of the 12th century. Located in Vienna, Austria, near the Stephansdom, it is the current seat of the Grand Master of the Order.

== Church ==
This Gothic church was built in the 14th century (1326–1375) and consecrated to St. Elisabeth of Hungary. Some of the stucco work was performed by the Italian artists Simone Allio in 1697 and Girolamo Alfieri in 1700. The church was remodelled in Baroque style in 1720 (probably) by the architect Anton Erhard Martinelli, while Count Guido von Starhemberg was the commander of the Order. Alfieri worked again in this church in the period 1720–1725, as well as the sculptor Giovanni Antonio Canevale. However, the church has retained some of its Gothic origins, such as pointed arches in the windows.

The walls are decorated with rows of numerous armorial bearings of the Order of Teutonic Knights and several commemorative stones, such as the tombstone of Count Siegfried Sarau with relief work by Giovanni Stanetti and of bailiff Jobst von Wetzhausen (1524) by Loy Hering.

Of particular interest is the Flemish winged triptych, a polychromed altarpiece from 1520. The woodcarver and the painter are unknown. The polychromy was made and signed by Jan van Wavere, a polychromer from Mechelen. It depicts in vivid woodcarvings scenes from the Passion of Christ.

== Treasury of the Teutonic Order ==
The church is incorporated in the Deutschordenshaus, the seat of the Order. Next to the cobbled inner courtyard is the Schatzkammer (the Treasure Room), a real ecclesiastical treasure trove that has been turned into a museum, consisting of five rooms on the second floor. The different collections have been built by successive Grand Masters during eight centuries. They constitute one of the oldest treasure collections in Vienna, covering the Gothic, Renaissance, and Baroque periods. The real start of the Schatzkammer can be dated to 1525 when the Grand Master Albert of Prussia converted to Lutheranism and declared the collections his private property. The museum was reopened on 22 April 2006 after an extensive renovation.

The first room displays Gothic coins, medals, seals, crosses, and a 13th-century coronation ring.

The second room shows chalices with silvery filigree, but also some more extravagant features. There is a salt-cellar tree, made from red coral, hung with sharks' teeth. In medieval times these were thought to be fossilized adders' tongues, able to detect poisoned food. Also remarkable are a number of vessels made of coconut shells, such one from Goa with silver mountings and another one in chinoiserie style. Also notable is a silver chain (c. 1500) for the sword carried by the members of the Order. It carries a hanger depicting the Madonna and Child and the insignia of the Order. A precious table clock is adorned with garnets and turquoise and surrounded with a garland of gilded leaves.

The other rooms contain a collection of oriental arms such as a Sumatran kris with a wavy blade and a rhino horn handle, carved in the shape of Buddha with precious stones. Another valuable piece of the collection is the charter by Pope Gregory IX from 1235, declaring Elisabeth of Thuringia a saint. Finally, there are several Gothic paintings and a Carinthian woodcarving of Saint George and the Dragon.

The treasury is open on Tuesdays, Thursdays and Saturdays 10am-12noon, Wednesdays and Fridays 3-5pm.

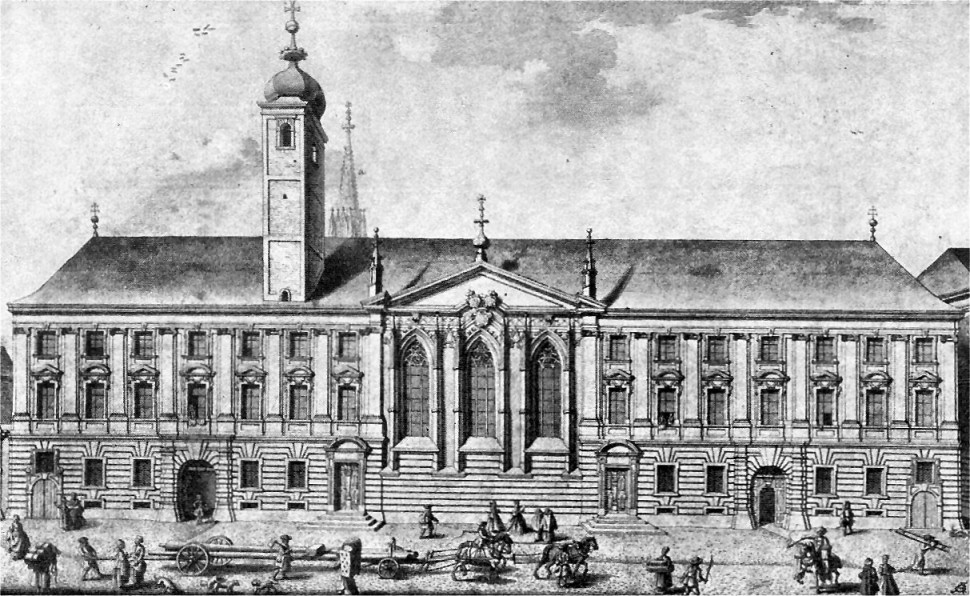
Preceptory (Deutschordenshaus) in 1733 (Drawing of S. Kleiner).

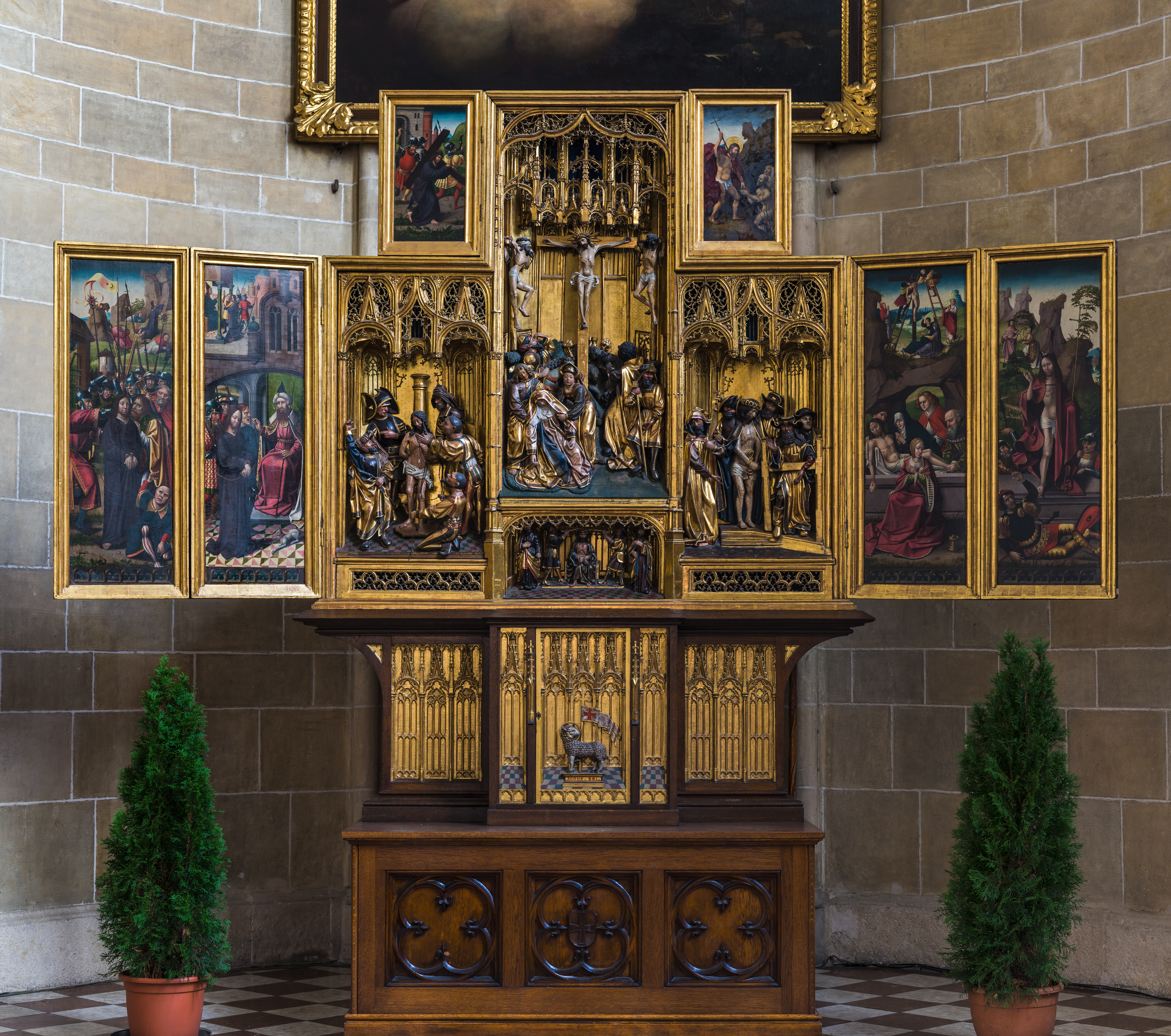
Winged triptych made in part by Jan van Wavere in 1520.

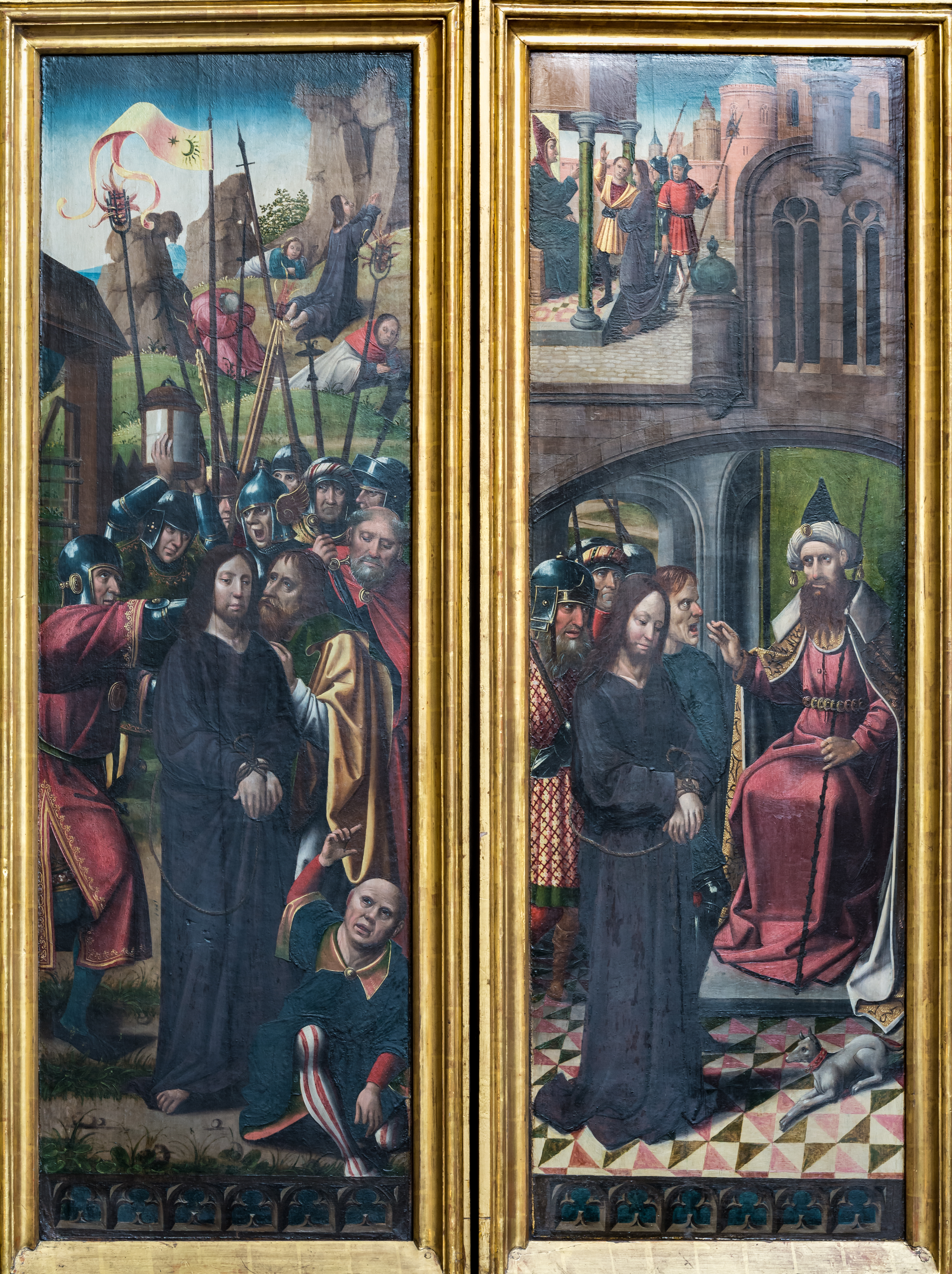
Capture of the Lord (detail of triptych)

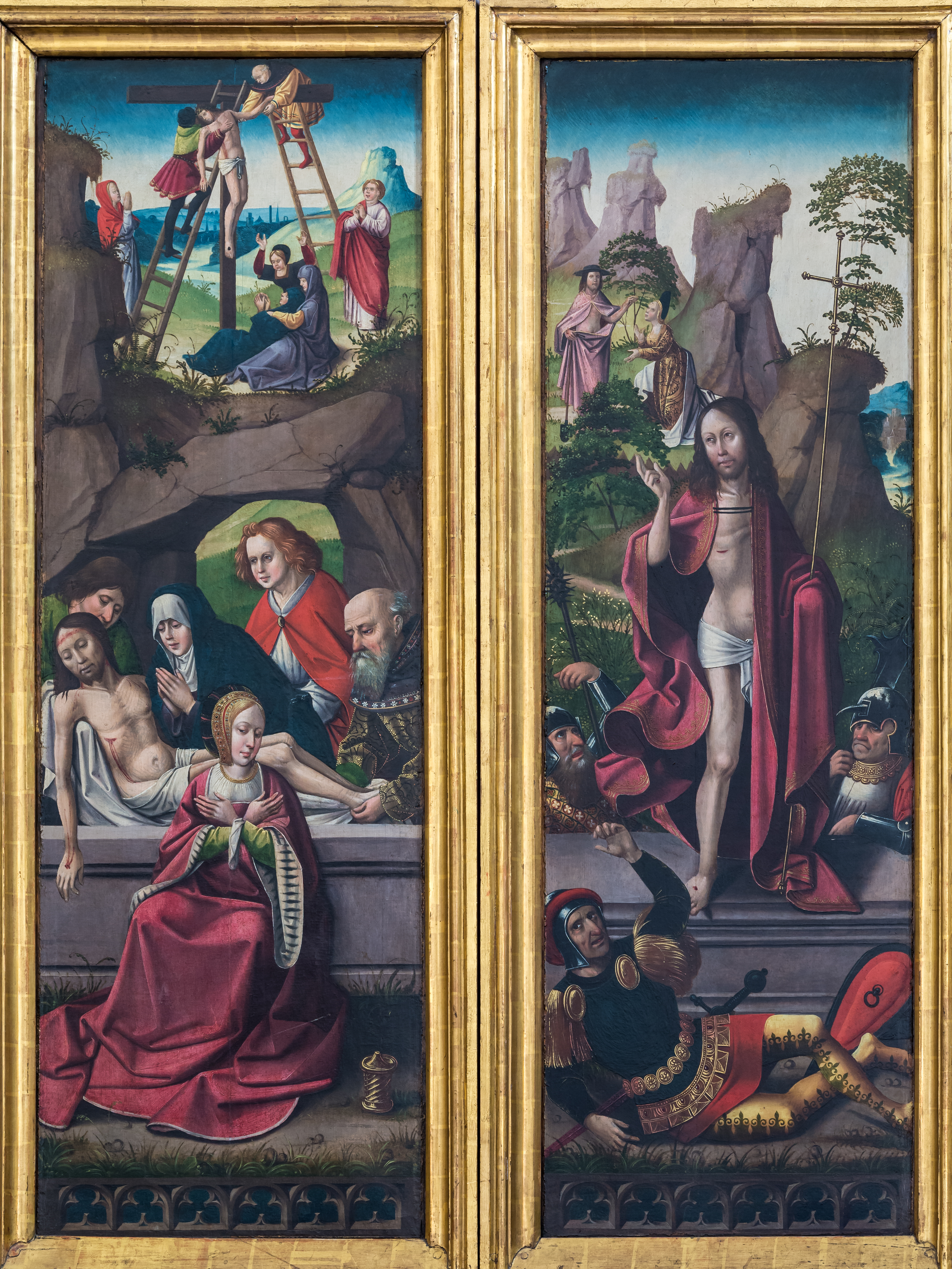
Burial and resurrection of the Lord (detail of triptych)

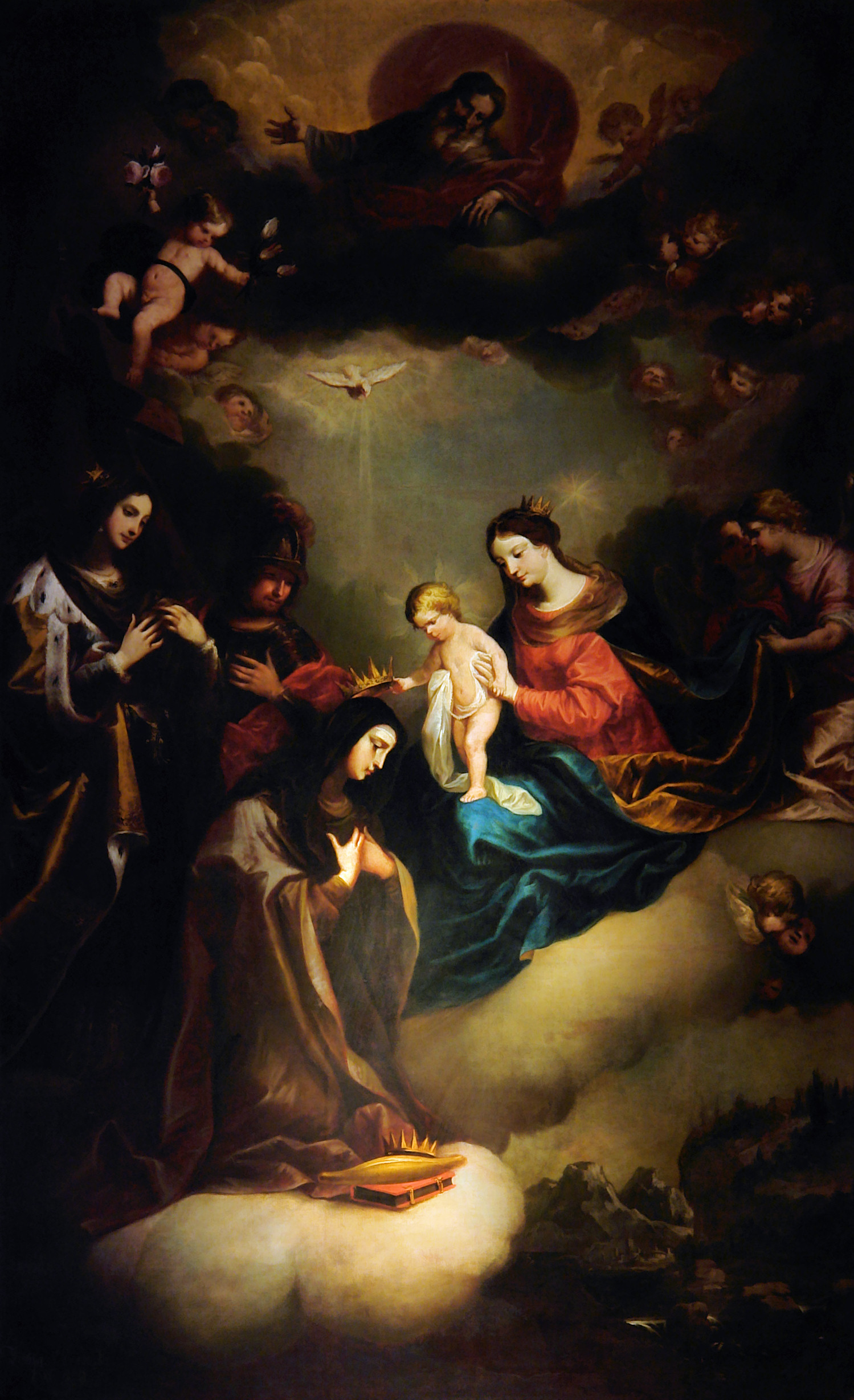
Coronation of Saint Elisabeth of Thüringen by the Virgin Mary and Christ, together with Saint George and Saint Helena (Tobias Pock, 1667).
