= Johan Oxenstierna =

Swedish statesman (1611–1657)

His Excellency The High Well Born Count Johan Oxenstierna

Marshal of the Realm
- In office 1654–1657

President of the Wismar Tribunal
- In office 1655–1657

Personal details
- Born: 24 June 1611 Stockholm
- Died: 5 December 1657 (aged 46)
- Spouse(s): Anna Margareta Sture; Margareta Brahe
- Parent(s): Axel Oxenstierna (father); Anna Bååt (mother)
- Occupation: Statesman

Johan Axelsson Oxenstierna af Södermöre (24 June 1611 – 5 December 1657) was a Count and a Swedish statesman.

== Biography ==
The son of Lord High Chancellor Axel Oxenstierna, he was born in Stockholm. He completed his studies at Uppsala in 1633, and was sent by his father on a grand tour through France, the Netherlands, and Great Britain. He served under his brother-in-law Count Gustav Horn af Björneborg in the Thirty Years' War from 1632, and was subsequently employed by his father in various diplomatic missions, though his instructions were always so precise and minute that he was little more than the executor of the Chancellor's wishes. He was one of the commissioners who signed the truce of 1635 with Poland (Armistice of Stuhmsdorf or Treaty of Sztumska Wieś), and in 1639, much against his father's will, was made a Privy Councillor.

Along with Salvius, he represented Sweden at the great peace congress of Osnabrück, but as he received his instructions directly from his father, whereas Salvius was in the confidence of Queen Christina, the two "legates" were constantly at variance. From 1650 to 1652 he was Governor General of Swedish Pomerania. King Charles X Gustav made him Marshal of the Realm.

== See also ==
- Polish-Swedish War

== Notes ==
Court offices
Preceded by Adolph John of Pfalz-Zweibrücken	Marshal of the Realm; 1654–1657	Succeeded by Gabriel Gabrielsson Oxenstierna
Legal offices
Preceded by ?	President of the Wismar Tribunal; 1655–1657	Succeeded by ?
Titles of nobility
Preceded by Axel Oxenstierna	Count of Södermöre; 1st creation 1654–1657	Succeeded by Axel Eriksson Oxenstierna
Preceded by Axel Oxenstierna	Baron of Kimito; 1st creation 1652–1657	Succeeded by ?
