= Jan van Wavere =

Jan Van Wavere
- Born: Jan Wavere; Unknown
- Died: 1521/22; Mechelen
- Known for: Polychromy

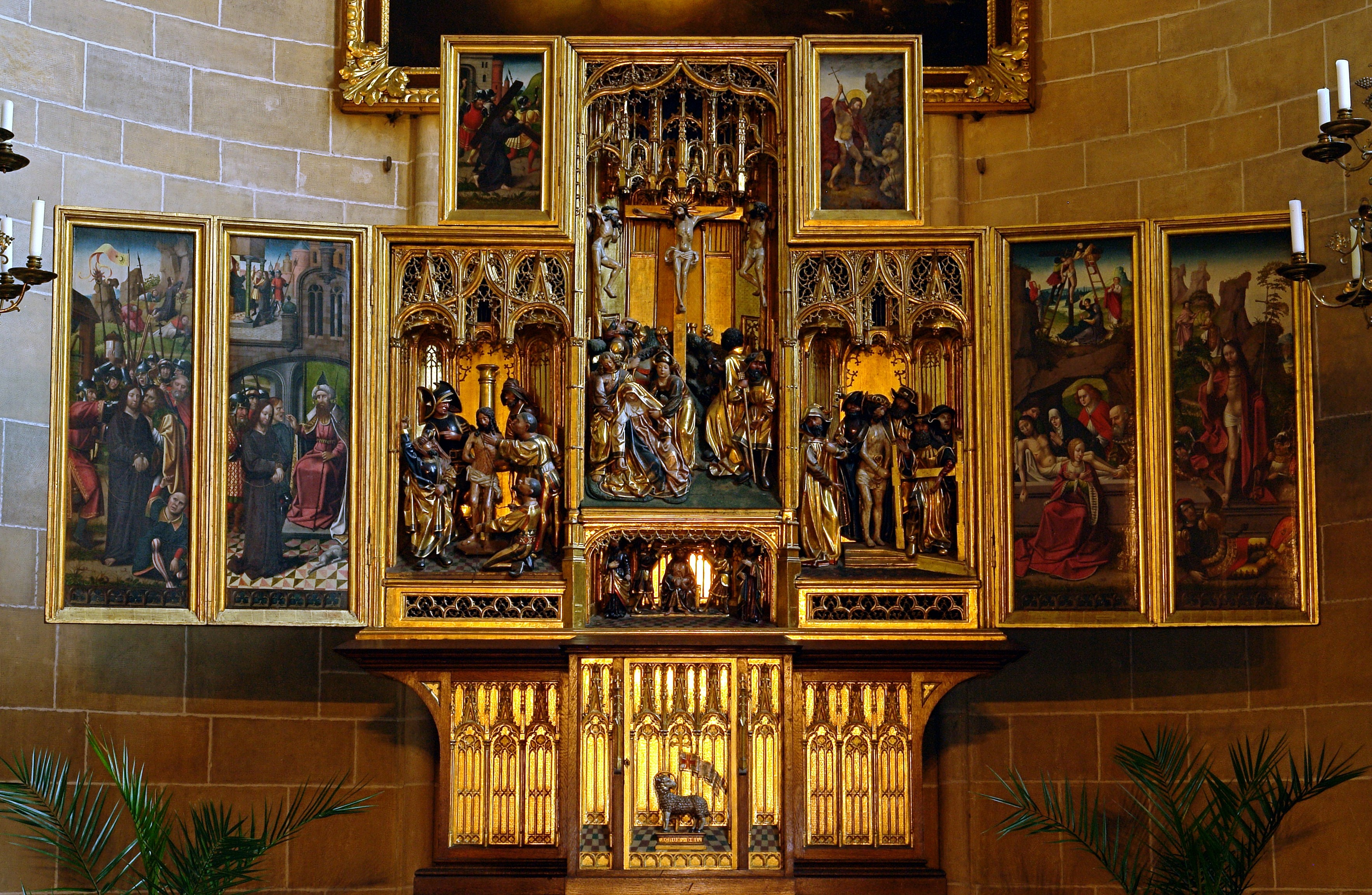
Winged triptych made by Jan van Wavere in 1520 (Vienna, Austria)

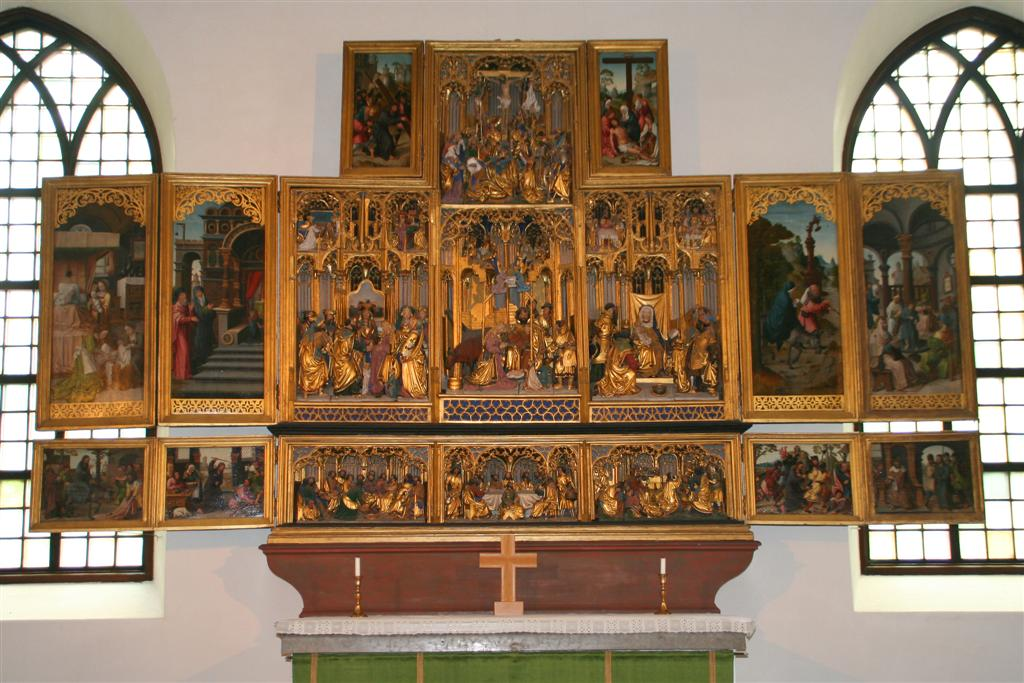
Winged triptych made by Jan van Wavere in 1515 (parish church of Jäder, Sweden)

Jan Van Wavere (? – 1521/22) was an influential Brabantine polychromer of late gothic Brabantine altarpieces (also called retables), mainly produced in the Brabantine towns of Antwerp, Brussels and Mechelen. During the 15th–16th century, over 1000 altarpieces were traded and exported to many European countries. More than 300 complete examples of Brabantine altarpieces can still be found in museums and churches all over Europe, from the Baltic countries (e.g. St. Nicholas' Church, Tallinn) down to Spain.

== Life and work ==
Little is known about his life. Jan van Wavere, who worked in Mechelen, was one of the few 16th century polychromers with sufficient reputation to sign his works. Three carved wooden altarpieces are signed with the name Jan van Wavere.

- Altarpiece of Church of the Order of Teutonic Knights (Vienna, Austria)

- Signature: "I. V. Wavere"
- Date: 1520

- St Dymphna reliquary placed on top of the Dymphna-altarpiece (Brussels, 1490–1500) in the church of St Dymphna (Gheel, Belgium)

- Created in Mechelen
- Date: 1515

- Altarpiece of the Jäder Church (Jäder, Sweden)

- Executed in the workshop of Jan Borman in Brussels
- Artists: Jan Van Coninxloo (painter) and Jan van Wavere (polychromer)
- Signatures: "1514/Jan van Coninxloo/Brussel" and "Ian van Wavere heeft dit ghehad"
- Date: 1514

His name was also mentioned in the account books of Pand market, operated by the Cathedral of Our Lady (Antwerp), an annual trade fair for the exhibition and sale of works of art (1460–1560)
