= Jan van Coninxloo =

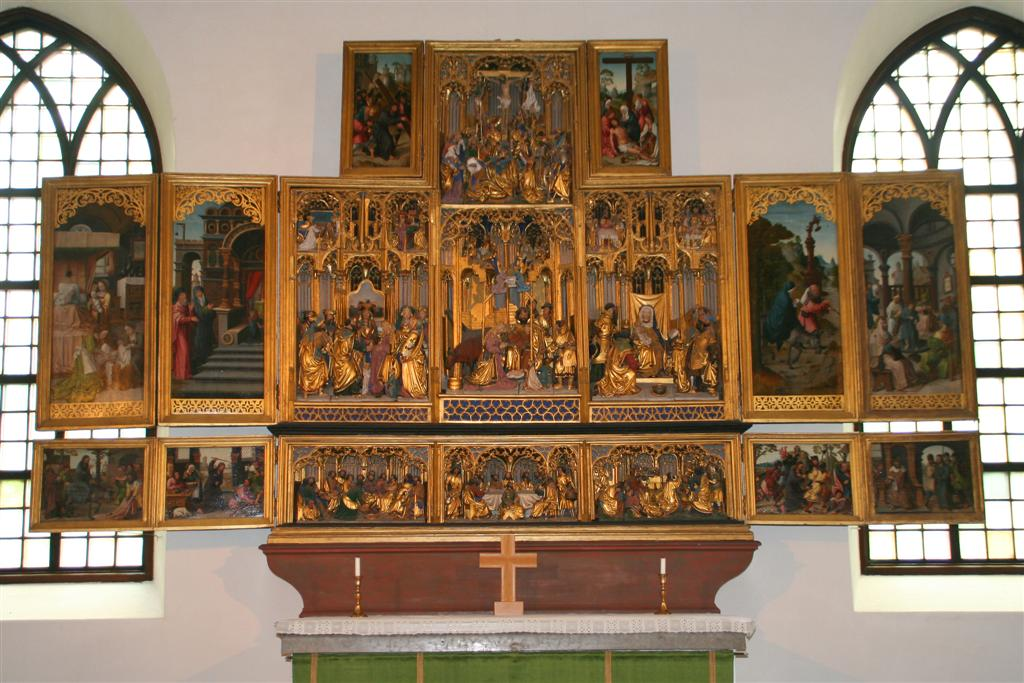
Altarpiece of Jäder Church in Södermanland County, Sweden. Paintings by Van Coninxloo, polychromy by Jan van Wavere, sculptures by Jan Borman.

Jan van Coninxloo or van Coninxlo, also known as Jan II or Jan the Younger, was a painter born in Brussels, Duchy of Brabant in 1489 (?), but nothing is known of the details of his career. His father, who bore the same Christian name, had another son, Pieter van Coninxloo, both of whom were painters. The name is found written in a variety of ways — Ccninxlo, Conninxlo, Connixlo, Cooninxloo, Conixloo — and sometimes with the additional name of Schemier. The Brussels Gallery contains five works by Jan van Coninxlo : a triptych of the 'Life of St. Anne,' which bears on its right wing (representing the death of that saint) the signature 'Jan van Conixlo 1546'; the 'Birth of St. Nicholas,' and the 'Death of St. Nicholas,' both of which were formerly in a church in Louvain; 'Christ among the Doctors,' and the 'Marriage at Cana.' These were formerly attributed to Gilles van Coninxlo.
