= Erik Oxenstierna =

Swedish statesman (1624–1656)

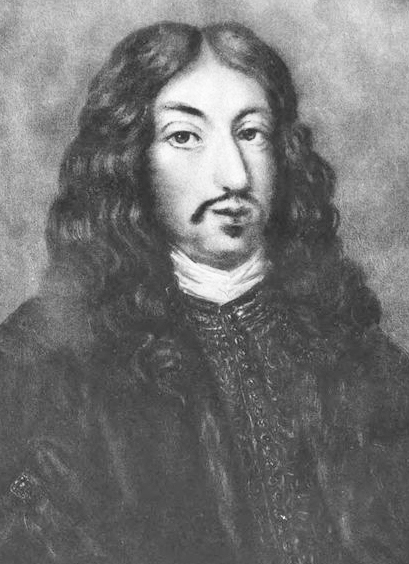
- Portrait, c. 1650

Lord High Chancellor of Sweden
- In office 1654–1656
- Preceded by: Axel Oxenstierna
- Succeeded by: Magnus Gabriel De la Gardie
- Monarch: Charles X Gustav

Governor-General of Swedish Estonia
- In office 1646–1653

Personal details
- Born: 13 February 1624 Fiholm Castle, Södermanland County, Sweden
- Died: 23 October 1656 (aged 32)
- Spouse: Elsa Elisabeth Brahe (m. 1648)
- Children: 6
- Occupation: Statesman

Erik Axelsson Oxenstierna (13 February 1624 – 23 October 1656) was a Swedish statesman. A member of the Oxenstierna family, he was the son of Axel Oxenstierna and served as the Lord High Chancellor of Sweden from 1654 until his death in 1656.

== Early life and education ==
Erik Axelsson Oxenstierna was born on 13 February 1624 at Fiholm Castle as the third son of Axel Oxenstierna. In March 1633, he attended Uppsala University, which was considered unusually young for the time.

In 1643, as part of his preparation for public service, Oxenstierna travelled to the Dutch Republic. He studied Dutch language, politics, history, literature, and commerce in Amsterdam before continuing to Leiden University, where he focused on law and political theory. At Leiden, he attended lectures by jurist Arnold Vinnius and the historian Marcus Zuerius Boxhorn. He also maintained contacts with key noble families, including the House of Orange and the House of Wittelsbach. His education prepared him as a future statesman with an understanding of European governance.

== Political career ==
Erik Oxenstierna's political career formally began in 1646, when he was appointed Governor-General of Swedish Estonia, headquartered in Reval, with guidance from his father. As governor, Oxenstierna faced entrenched local resistance to centralisation. Estonia, like Livonia, remained legally and socially fragmented. The province operated under multiple legal codes, the nobility controlled most of the land. The rural populations defended their historic privileges, which caused church and educational reform to stall. Oxenstierna's governorship ended in 1653 and revealed the complexities of governing the empire's eastern territories and stressed the limits of centralised Swedish control in the Baltic.

In 1654, following the death of his father, the abdication of Queen Christina and the accession of King Charles X Gustav, Oxenstierna was appointed Lord High Chancellor of Sweden, succeeding his father in the kingdom's highest civil office. In this role, he shared the management of state affairs, including supervision of the Chamber of Accounts, likely in connection with investigations involving Magnus Gabriel De la Gardie.

Oxenstierna also inherited his father's political philosophies of moderation and responsible noble governance, a doctrine Axel Oxenstierna had promoted since 1632. After the death of King Gustavus Adolphus, Axel had worked to maintain balance between monarchy and nobility, warning the latter against defending indefensible political positions and abusing privileges. Erik embraced these ideals, applying them in practice during the partial reduktion (reduction) of 1655, a policy aimed at reclaiming lands and revenues from the nobility for the Crown. He effectively advocated for the king's cause before the council and nobility, managing to avoid conflict despite the issue's sensitivity.

== Personal life ==
Erik Oxenstierna married Elsa Elisabeth Brahe in 1648 and had six children:

- Anna Margareta (1650-1672), married Clas Åkesson Tott the Younger (1630-1674),
- Christina (1651-1711), married Gabriel Turesson Oxenstierna
- Axel (1652-1676),
- Lisbeta (born 1653),
- Elisabet (1654-1721), married Gustaf Adolf De la Gardie (1647-1695)
- Carl Gustaf (1655-1686), married Ebba Hedwig De la Gardie (1659-1700).

Oxenstierna died unexpectedly on 23 October 1656 at the age of 32.
