= Tidö Agreement =

2022 Swedish political agreement

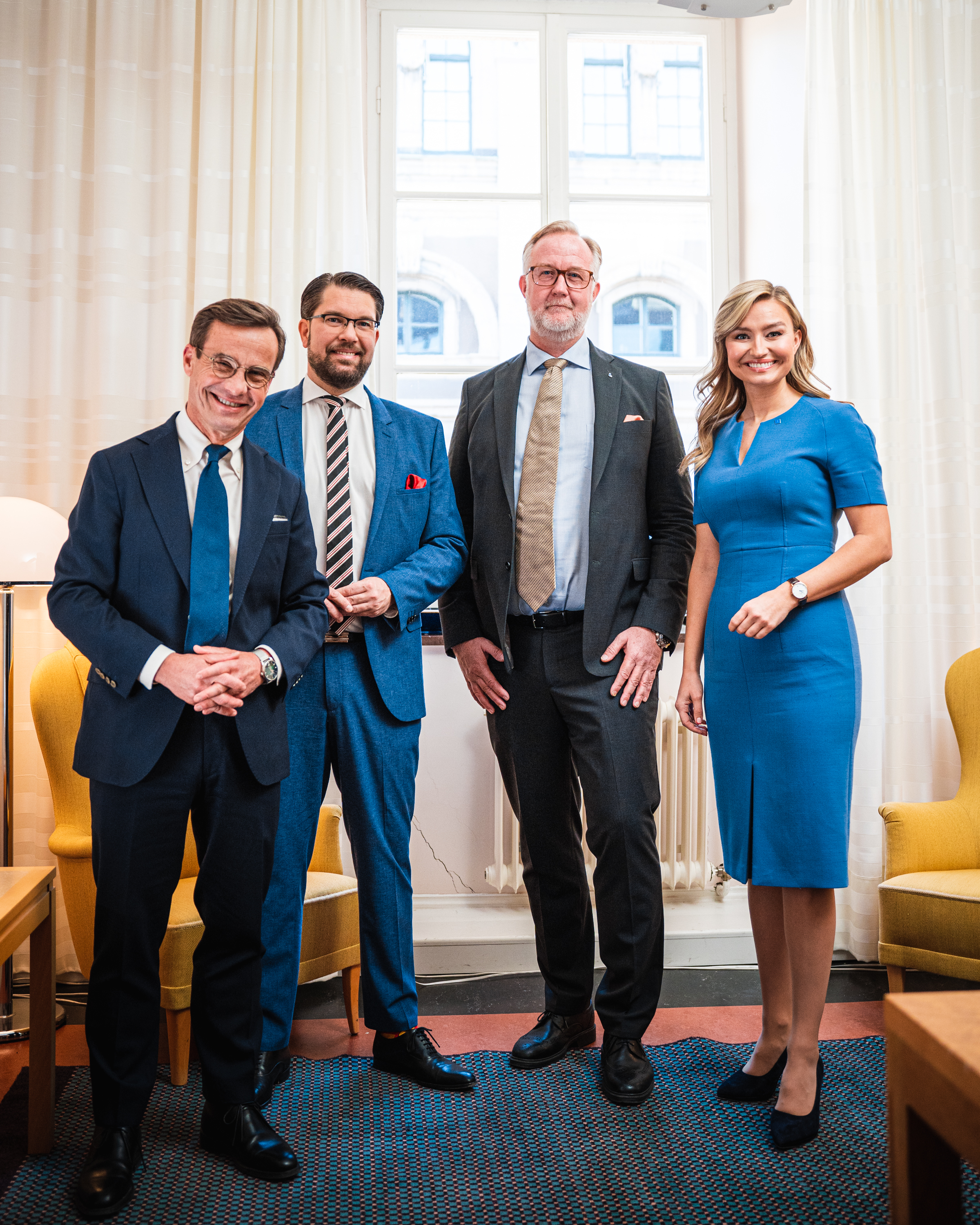
- Party leaders Ulf Kristersson, Jimmie Åkesson, Johan Pehrson and Ebba Busch gathered before the press conference where the Tidö Agreement was presented.
- Native name: Tidöavtalet
- Date: 14 October 2022
- Location: Tidö Castle, Västmanland, Sweden
- Type: Coalition government agreement
- Organised by: Jimmie Åkesson (SD); Ulf Kristersson (M); Ebba Busch (KD); Johan Pehrson (L)
- Participants: Sweden Democrats (SD); Moderate Party (M); Christian Democrats (KD); Liberals (L)

The Tidö Agreement (Swedish: Tidöavtalet) is a political agreement of Riksdag parties from the centre-right to far-right bloc (Sweden Democrats, Moderate Party, Christian Democrats and Liberals) for appointing Ulf Kristersson of the Moderate Party as Prime Minister of Sweden and the Kristersson cabinet as the Government of Sweden after the 2022 Swedish general election. The name Tidö Agreement comes from Tidö Castle in Västmanland, where the four party leaders negotiated the agreement.

== History ==
=== Background ===
Historically, the Moderate Party (M), Christian Democrats (KD) and Liberals (L) were part of the Alliance for Sweden, a centre-right coalition that governed the country from 2006 to 2014. The Sweden Democrats (SD), a right-wing populist party to which all parliamentary parties applied a cordon sanitaire until Ulf Kristersson broke it after the 2018 Swedish general election as the only way for the right-wing bloc to oust the left-wing bloc led by the Swedish Social Democratic Party (S), have not sat in a government and have not been involved in the formation of a government but had participated in state budget talks with M and KD for the first time in Autumn 2021, and then got the budget through.

With the agreement, named after the place where it was negotiated, this is the first time SD have formalised influence over a government's policy. The party leaders will annually decide how the cooperation projects will continue for the coming year. SD will have the same influence on issues in the cooperation projects as the parties in the government.

=== 2022 Swedish general election and government formation ===
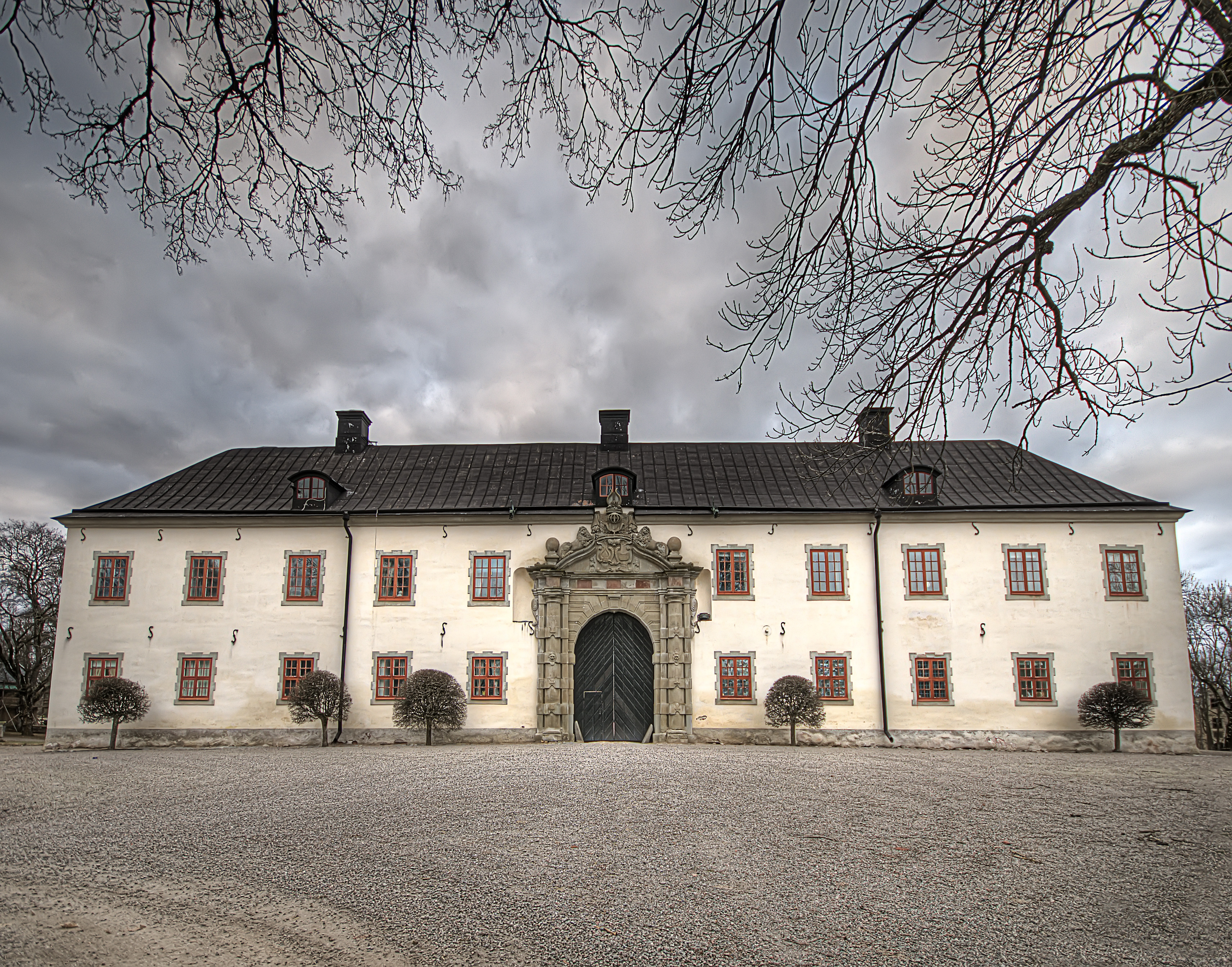
Tidö Castle, where the negotiations took place.

The 2022 Swedish general election was held on 11 September and the agreement was announced on 14 October, one month after the election. The four parties behind the deal had a narrow parliamentary majority to win a vote, and it could be achieved through compromise. At the same time, M, KD and L combined have fewer seats than S, and must rely on SD for every vote. The agreement was finalised after a month of negotiations between the right-wing bloc parties. This means that M, KD and L are part of a minority government, while SD gets civil servants in the government office (despite internal opposition from L, the more vocal anti-SD party within the right-wing bloc, and it being one of the red lines the party had drawn prior to the election) and gives external support through confidence and supply to assure the Kristersson-led government of its absolute majority.

On 17 October, the Riksdag approved Kristersson as Prime Minister of Sweden in a 176–173 vote. It is the first time SD will hold direct government influence. Some European Union lawmakers criticised the centre-right and the Moderate Party in particular, as a member of the European People's Party, for allying with the far right, as did opposition leaders. Debate within the Liberals was particularly vociferous, with the party being split broadly down the middle on the question on whether joining a center-right government cooperating with the Sweden Democrats, or a center-left government – as it had between 2019 and 2022 – presumably led by the Social Democrats, which the party had historically opposed since the end of the Edén cabinet in 1920. The controversy would continue for the following four years with resignations and defections, particularly over the issue on the question of sitting in a government with Sweden Democrat ministers in the future.

The members of the agreement has derisively been referred to as Tidölaget ("The Tidö Team"), but playing on the near-homophone tidelaget, referring to an act of bestiality.

== Contents ==
The agreement is around 63 pages in which the parties have agreed on seven major cooperation projects.

=== Growth and household economy ===
Paragraph one of the Tidö Agreement describes the overall direction of the economic policy during the term of office. The agreement has led to the direction of the economic policy being to counteract unemployment and strengthen Sweden's ability to grow. The companies' administrative costs must be reduced during the mandate period. Arbetslinjen (A) will be strengthened through a major grant reform with, among other things, grant caps and activity requirements for those who live with social security in Sweden. Health insurance must provide financial security for those who cannot work due to illness. The level of the A fund that applies today should apply in the future is not included in the agreement but was stated at the press meeting. The tax on work is reduced with a focus on low and middle income earners, as is the tax on pensions. To further support households, the tax on savings is reduced. Household compensation for high electricity prices and fuel prices is greatly reduced, among other things by lowering the reduction obligation to the European Union's minimum level. Corporate taxation must be competitive and companies must have good incentives to invest in research and be given a better opportunity to attract and retain key competence. The conditions for small and medium-sized enterprises to grow, employ and attract capital must be improved.

=== Crime ===
Point two of the Tidö Agreement deals with crime and punishment. The agreement explains that groundbreaking measures will be implemented to stop the gangs. These include, among other things, double punishment for criminal gangs, criminalisation of participation in criminal gangs, more effective secret means of coercion, visitation zones, anonymous witnesses, residence bans, abolition of penalty discounts for those over 18 and abolition of quantity discount. At the same time, efforts are being made to prevent crime with increased parental responsibility, more care in accordance with the Swedish Care of Young Persons (Special Provisions) Act and an investigation into the lowering of the age of criminal responsibility. A national social intervention force is established, which will conduct environmental analysis and convey proven methods to prevent crime and train social workers in dealing with young people who commit or are at risk of committing crime. Parental support programs are being expanded. A complete and thorough review of the criminal legislation is being carried out with the aim of, among other things, toughening the punishment for violent and sexual crimes. The police, the Swedish Prison and Probation Service and other authorities within the justice system will expand greatly.

=== Migration and integration ===
The third point on human migration and social integration says that there will be a shift in Swedish migration policy. Swedish migration must be adjusted to the minimum level according to European Union law, while maintaining international conventions, including the right to asylum. The following reforms will be implemented within the framework of the project: increased use of biometric data in alien cases, enhanced possibilities for internal alien controls, intensified return work, tightened labour immigration and tightened conditions for family immigration, transit centers throughout the asylum process, deportation due to lack of travel and tightened requirements for citizenship and revocation of residence permits in several cases. The integration policy is being changed to become more demand-based, where those who are in Sweden for a long time must take responsibility for becoming part of society.

=== Climate and energy ===
Point four of the agreement says that the electricity system must be restored so that people and companies receive stable and low electricity prices and to reduce emissions by increasing the efficiency of the transition. The energy policy goal is changed from 100 per cent renewable energy to 100 per cent fossil-free. The conditions for investments in nuclear power must be strengthened through, among other things, government credit guarantees of SEK 400 billion. New rules must be introduced that prevent politics from arbitrarily shutting down nuclear power plants, which must be guaranteed the right to operate and produce electricity as long as the facilities are in good condition and operated safely. An investigation into the restart of the Ringhals Nuclear Power Plants 1 and 2 will be carried out quickly. The prohibitions in the Environmental Code to allow new reactors in other locations than today and to have more than ten in operation at the same time are removed. The ban on restarting closed reactors must be removed. Better conditions for hydropower and cogeneration were also agreed upon. A program for international climate investments in accordance with Article Six of the Paris Agreement is being developed. The investments contribute through complementary measures to achieving the Swedish climate goal of net zero emissions in 2045. Investments in expanded charging infrastructure and carbon capture and storage will be implemented.

=== Healthcare ===
Point five of the agreement concerns health care where the focus of care must change. Care queues must be cut, accessibility improved and equality between different parts of the country ensured. An inquiry is appointed with the task of analysing and elucidating the pros and cons, as well as making proposals on the possibilities of introducing partial or full state ownership in the long term. A national healthcare agency under state auspices is being set up to cut queues in healthcare. A national long-term plan to eliminate the shortage of care places must also be drawn up. Work to strengthen mental health and suicide prevention must be prioritised as part of public health work, especially young people. Special investments in cancer and childhood cancer care, including aftercare and rehabilitation, must be made, as well as investments in equal care and research into female genital disease and women's health. A national maternity plan is drawn up with the aim of strengthening maternity care, increasing accessibility and reducing regional differences. The digital infrastructure in healthcare is reformed and becomes more uniform. Opportunities for home abortion are carried out in accordance with previous decisions. Proposals are made about how the woman's right to abortion can be protected in the form of government. An investigation is added to strengthen dental care's high-cost protection to more closely mimic what exists in other care. Elderly people with the worst oral health must be prioritised.

=== School and education ===
Point six of the agreement concerns the Swedish school and education. Swedish schools must undergo a substantial knowledge lift. Steps are being taken to introduce a nationally binding school fee standard with the aim of increasing equality in Swedish schools throughout the country through state control of funding. Teaching time must be increased and the school's governing documents (curricula, syllabus and subject plans) reformed and given increased focus on learning, skills and factual and subject knowledge. A knowledge-focused system of grading in education is introduced to stop problems with grade inflation and a new independent school law is to be introduced. Profit distribution must not occur in the first years after a school is started or bought by a new owner. The purpose is to guarantee long-term ownership and that whoever starts or acquires a charter school must have financial strength. Investments in more special teachers, smaller teaching groups and clearer rules to establish order in the classrooms.

=== Democracy and culture ===
The seventh and last point in the agreement deals with democracy and culture. Freedom and diversity of the media must be promoted. The independence of public broadcasting must remain and its long-term funding maintained. In a partially new media landscape, public service operations need to be developed as part of the democratic infrastructure. Measures are taken to reduce the political control of cultural content and a Swedish cultural canon must be produced.

== Reactions ==
=== NGOs ===
The Agreement was met with concern among human rights groups. Amnesty International stated that several of the points "risk seriously harming the principles of the rule of law and other fundamental human rights", adding that it "demonstrates an intent to create divisions between people and to stigmatise non-Swedish citizens". Civil Rights Defenders stated that the Agreement "contains several measures that clearly breach the human rights norms that Sweden is bound to", particularly in its criminal and migration policies.

A group of five environmental NGOs groups (Klimatkollen, the World Wide Fund for Nature, ClimateView, the Swedish Society for Nature Conservation, and Our Children’s Climate) co-wrote a statement saying that the climate provisions of the agreement could lead to a significant increase in greenhouse emissions, "equivalent to half of Sweden’s annual emissions" over four years, adding that environmental policy was "full speed backwards". Isabella Lövin, chair of the Stockholm Environment Institute, stated that environmental policy had been "set back 35 years".

ActionAid International warned that the Agreement represented "a major deprioritisation in matters that should warrant the highest degree of concern - girls' and women's rights, and climate justice". Human Rights Watch criticised the government's intention to scrap the country's feminist foreign policy, stating that "advancing and protecting women’s rights should be every government’s priority".

=== Liberal Party ===
The participation of the Liberals in a government agreement with the Sweden Democrats caused a level of controversy within the party. Several prominent Liberal politicians would quit the party due to the agreement, including former European Commissioner Cecilia Malmström, former party leader Bengt Westerberg, and former Minister for European Union Affairs Birgitta Ohlsson.

The party faced criticism from the Alliance of Liberals and Democrats for Europe Party (ALDE), the European group to which the Liberals are affiliated, for signing an agreement with the Sweden Democrats. ALDE said that it would be investigating the relationship between the Liberals and the Sweden Democrats, whereas Renew Europe, ALDE's group in the European Parliament, stated that Liberals leader Johan Pehrson would be excluded from future conferences.

On 20 November 2022, Expressen published leaked comments Liberal leader Johan Pehrson had made in a meeting with party members in which Pehrson referred to the Sweden Democrats as "a brown sludge", referring to the Nazi Brownshirts, and claimed that he had prevented "a load of crazy stuff" from being included in the agreement. Pehrson later told SVT that his comments had been sensationalised by Expressen and that the two parties could cooperate despite their ideological differences.

=== Other ===
National Police Commissioner Anders Thornberg spoke positively of the parts of the Agreement that concerned policing, saying that it was "worth testing". The Swedish Police Union criticised provisions of the Agreement that would limit the right to publicly funded interpreters to only those with residence permits or citizenship, saying that it could negatively impact their ability to interview witnesses.
