= Axel Oxenstierna =

Swedish statesman (1583–1654)

The High Wellborn Count Axel Oxenstierna
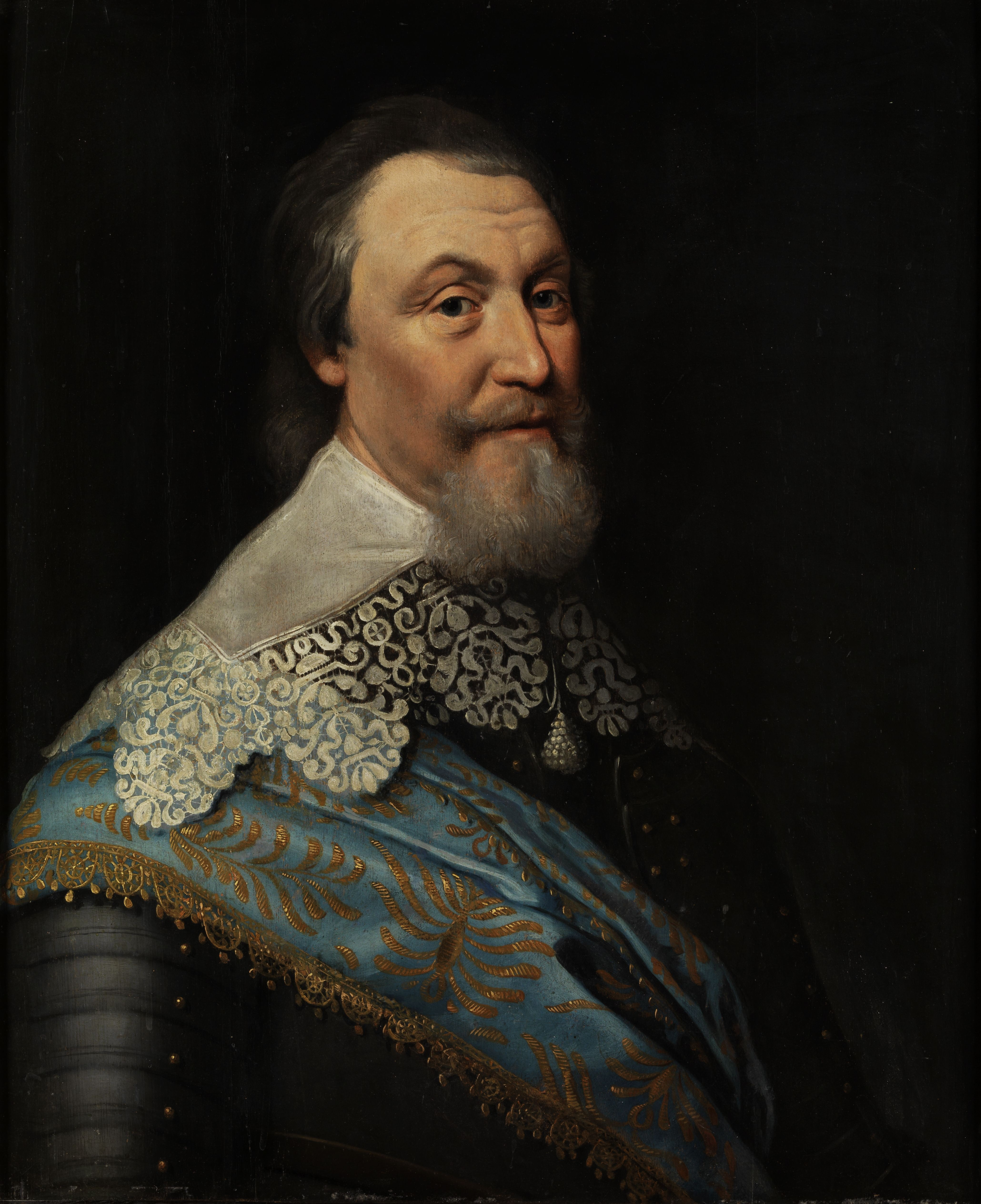

Lord High Chancellor of Sweden
- In office 1612–1654
- Preceded by: Svante Turesson Bielke
- Succeeded by: Erik Oxenstierna
- Monarchs: Gustavus Adolphus; Christina

Governor-General of Riga
- In office 1622–1626
- Preceded by: Office created
- Succeeded by: Office abolished

Governor-General of Prussia
- In office 1626–1631
- Preceded by: Office created
- Succeeded by: Office abolished

Personal details
- Born: 16 June 1583 Fånö, Sweden
- Died: 28 August 1654 (aged 71) Stockholm, Sweden
- Spouse: Anna Åkesdotter Bååt
- Children: 13, including Johan
- Occupation: Statesman

Axel Gustafsson Oxenstierna (Swedish: [ˈǎksɛl ˈʊ̂ksɛnˌɧæːɳa]; 1583–1654) was a Swedish statesman and Count of Södermöre. He became a member of the Swedish Privy Council in 1609 and served as Lord High Chancellor of Sweden from 1612 until his death. He was a confidant of King Gustavus Adolphus and then Queen Christina, for whom he was at first regent.

Oxenstierna is widely considered to be one of the most influential people in Swedish history. He played an important role during the Thirty Years' War and was appointed Governor-General of occupied Prussia. He is credited for having laid the foundations of the Swedish model of governmental authority, with a large number of civil servants not politically appointed but appointed because of their merits. Oxenstierna is also credited for the modern central administrative structure of the State, including the creation of counties (Swedish: län).

== Early life and education ==
Oxenstierna was born on 16 June 1583, at Fånö in Uppland, the son of Gustaf Gabrielsson Oxenstierna and Barbro Axelsdotter Bielke, as the oldest of nine siblings. His parents belonged to the ancient and influential high noble families of Oxenstierna and Bielke, both of which had held high offices in the state and the church for generations. After the death of her husband Gustaf, Axel's mother Barbro decided to let Axel and his brothers Christer and Gustaf finish their studies abroad. Thus, the brothers received their education at the universities of Rostock, Wittenberg and Jena. On returning home in 1603 he took up an appointment as valet de chambre (kammarjunkare) to King Charles IX of Sweden.

One of Oxenstierna's more unusual intellectual qualifications was his knowledge of the Scots language, reflecting the importance of the Scottish expatriate community in Sweden at that time. As Chancellor, he would regularly receive correspondence in Scots from his agent Sir James Spens, and he ventured into the language himself for an official letter to his Scottish counterpart, the Earl of Loudoun.

== Career ==
=== 1606–1611: Diplomat and Privy Councillor ===
In 1606 he undertook his first diplomatic mission, to Mecklenburg and other German royal courts. While on diplomatic duty abroad, Oxenstierna gained appointment to the Privy Council (Riksrådet). Henceforth, Oxenstierna became one of the king's most trusted servants. In 1609 he travelled to Reval (present day Tallinn), on King Charles's behalf, to receive tributes from the city of Reval and the Estonian knighthood. Together with other councillors, Oxenstierna tried to warn the king of Denmark and the intentions of Danish King Christian IV. In 1610, Oxenstierna travelled to Copenhagen with the aim of preventing war with Denmark, but this mission was unsuccessful. The following year, Danish forces crossed the border, initiating the Kalmar War. In autumn 1611, King Charles died. Around New Year 1611–12, the parliament had to deal with the situation. According to the rules, the 17-year-old Gustavus Adolphus had not reached the proper age to be considered adult enough to rule as king. However, the estates agreed to disregard those rules. In return, the young king agreed to ensure the nobles further privileges and appoint Axel Oxenstierna Lord High Chancellor of Sweden.

=== 1612–1629: Lord High Chancellor and Governor-General ===
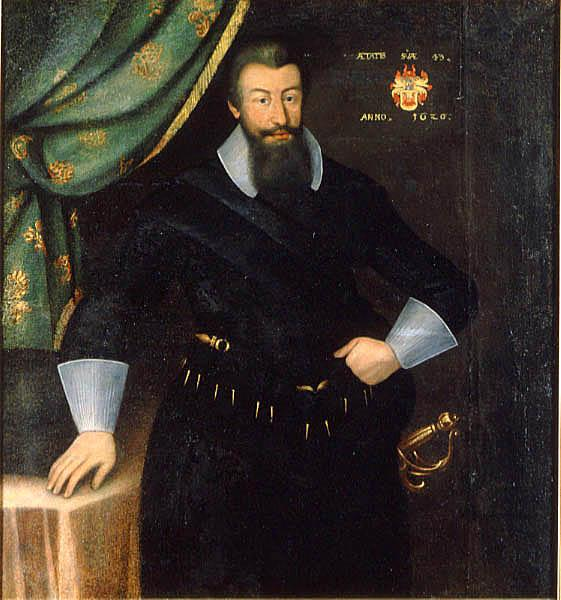
Axel Oxenstierna in 1626

On 6 January 1612 Oxenstierna became Lord High Chancellor (Rikskansler) of the Privy Council. His controlling, organising hand soon became apparent in every branch of the administration. Sweden was at the time troubled by three wars against Denmark (Kalmar War), Poland-Lithuania (Polish-Swedish War) and Russia (Ingrian War). Oxenstierna's first big task as Chancellor was to achieve peace in some of those wars. The war against Denmark was considered the most dangerous of the three, as the enemy controlled parts of Sweden itself. Negotiations began in Knäred and Oxenstierna was the principal Swedish plenipotentiary. The negotiations led to the Treaty of Knäred in 1613. For his efforts during these negotiations, Oxenstierna received the title of district judge in the hundred of Snävringe and, eventually, the barony of Kimito.

During the frequent absences of Gustavus in Livonia and in Finland (1614–1616) Oxenstierna acted as his viceroy. One assignment Oxenstierna received, while the king was in Livonia, was the task to finalise the negotiations regarding the marriage of John Casimir and the king's sister, Princess Catharina. At the coronation of Gustavus Adolphus, in October 1617, Oxenstierna was knighted. In 1620 he headed the embassy dispatched to Berlin to arrange the nuptial contract between Gustavus and Maria Eleonora of Brandenburg. During the king's Russian and Polish wars he had the principal duty of supplying the armies and the fleets with everything necessary, including men and money. Oxenstierna's ways of carrying out his assignments apparently gained King Gustavus's appreciation, since the king, in 1622, asked Oxenstierna to accompany him to Livonia and appointed him Governor-General and commandant of Riga, a strategically important town during the ongoing war against Poland. His services in Livonia gained him the reward of four castles (among others Burtnieki and Valmiera) and the whole bishopric of Wenden. Entrusted with the peace negotiations which led to the truce with Poland in 1623, he succeeded in averting a threatened rupture with Denmark in 1624. The Polish-Swedish War was reinitiated in 1626, and on 7 October that year, Oxenstierna became Governor-General in the newly acquired Swedish possession of Prussia. In 1629 he concluded the advantageous Truce of Altmark with Poland-Lithuania. Prior to this, in September 1628, he arranged a joint occupation of Stralsund with Denmark to prevent that important fortress from falling into the hands of the Imperialists.

Oxenstierna was not only highly successful in diplomacy; during these years he was entrusted with various important assignments in which he succeeded, such as gathering money and troops for the attack in Prussia in 1626. He played the leading organisational and administrational role in Prussia, as he had done earlier in Livonia. He was in charge of, for example, tolls, fortifications and the entire state grain trade. During the latter part of the 1620s, Elbląg (German: Elbing), where Oxenstierna resided and from where he governed the Swedish parts of Prussia, became a major Swedish centre of power, second only to Stockholm.

=== 1630–1636: Oxenstierna in the Thirty Years' War ===
When Sweden entered the Thirty Years' War in the summer of 1630, tolls from Oxenstierna-controlled Prussia, as well as food supplies acquired by Oxenstierna, were pivotal assets. He had also obtained credit from foreign businessmen involving large sums of money, making it possible to hire mercenary soldiers for the army used in Germany.

After the Battle of Breitenfeld on 7 September 1631, Oxenstierna received a summons to assist the king with his counsels and co-operation in Germany. During the king's absence in Franconia and Bavaria in 1632 he held the appointment of legatus in the Rhineland, with plenipotentiary authority over all the German generals and princes in the Swedish service. Although he never fought a battle, he frustrated all the efforts of the Spanish troops by using strategically successful regulations. He managed to channel a large number of reinforcements to King Gustavus through the heart of Germany in the summer of 1632.

In the Battle of Lützen (1632), on 6 November 1632, Gustavus Adolphus died. On 12 January 1633, the Swedish council formally commissioned Oxenstierna as the Crown's plenipotentiary legate in the Holy Roman Empire and with the armies, authorising him to conduct the war with the support of Sweden's allies; field operations remained in the hands of the generals. He moved his headquarters to Mainz, which in practice became the new Swedish capital. Oxenstierna was now absolute ruler of the significant area that the Swedish army had conquered in Germany. He was offered the position as prince-elector of Mainz, but, after serious considerations, the offer was turned down.

When King Gustavus died in November 1632, his only legitimate and surviving child, Christina, was almost six years old. Until her declaration of majority at 18, a regency council ruled Sweden. This council was headed by Lord High Chancellor Oxenstierna, who wrote Instrument of Government (1634), a new constitution. During the years after the king's death, it became apparent that differences of opinion existed within the council. Some of Oxenstierna's colleagues recommended that Sweden should seek peace and withdraw from the war in Germany, not least after the defeat at Nördlingen in 1634. However, Oxenstierna's opinion, that Sweden should remain in the war to ensure compensation for the sacrifices made, prevailed. The outcome at Nördlingen, disastrous for the Swedish side, brought him for an instant to the verge of ruin, and compelled him for the first time so far to depart from his policy of independence, by soliciting direct assistance from France. But, well aware that Richelieu needed the Swedish armies as much as he himself needed money, he refused at the Conference of Compiègne in 1635 to bind his hands in the future for the sake of some slight present relief. In 1636, nevertheless, he concluded a fresh subsidy-treaty with France at Wismar. Swedish troops remained in Germany all the way until the end of the Thirty Years' War's in 1648. Oxenstierna however left Germany and returned to Stockholm in 1636, after ten years duty as the premier Swedish representative in Prussia and Germany.

=== 1636–1654: Back in Sweden ===
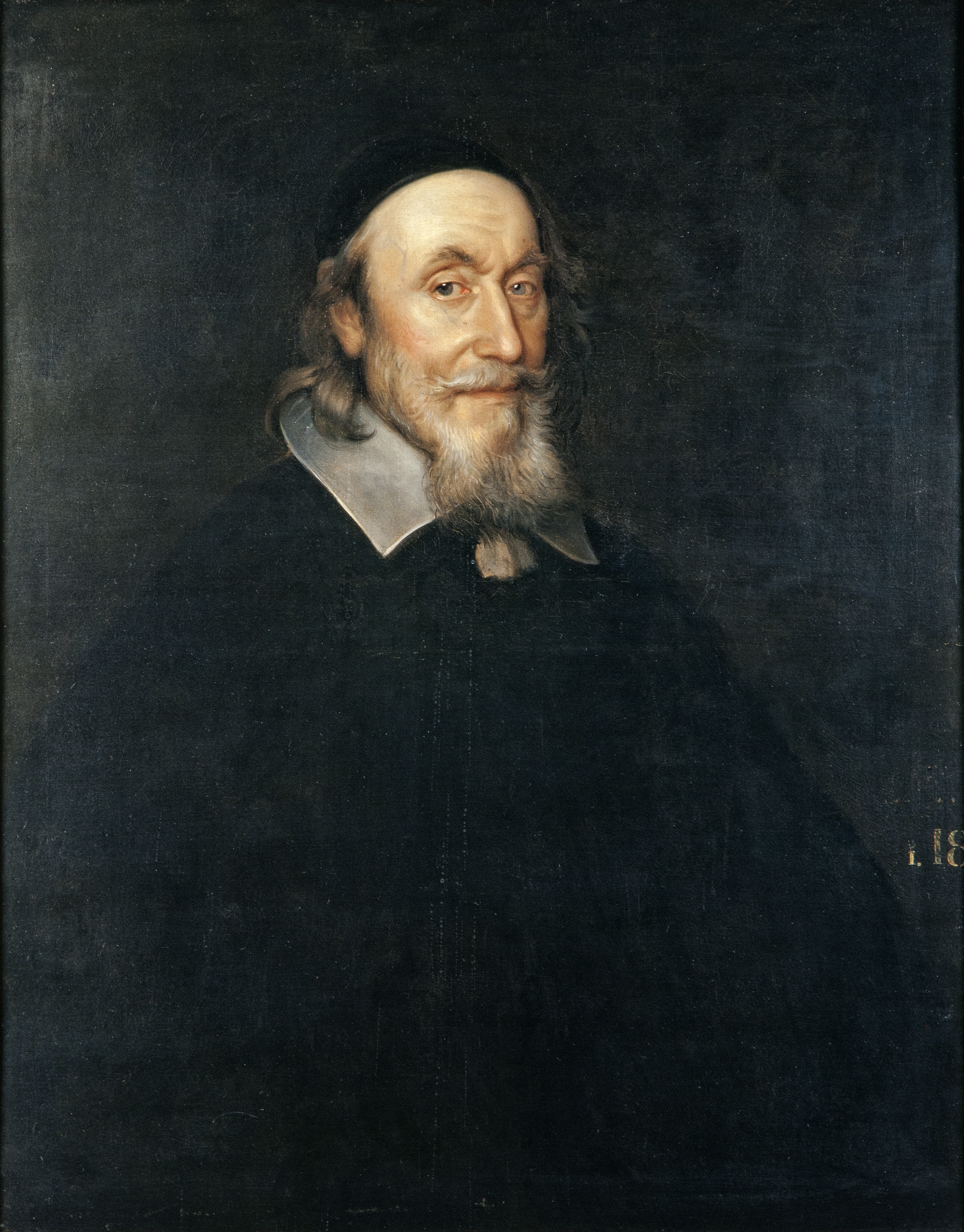
Portrait of Oxenstierna by David Beck

Oxenstierna more directly claimed his place within the regency of Queen Christina and became the young queen's teacher in statesmanship. His presence at home dominated all opposition, and such was the general confidence for Oxenstierna, that for the next nine years his voice, especially regarding foreign affairs, remained omnipotent in the Privy Council.

==== Torstenson War ====
In May 1643, the Swedish Privy Council decided to attack Denmark. The Torstenson War was to a large degree the work of Oxenstierna. The purpose was to gain territories from Denmark and to be released from the Danish Sound Dues. Another factor might have been a will to avenge the tough peace Treaty of Knäred in 1613. Whatever the reason, Oxenstierna considered that the time was right to finally settle the score with Denmark. Swedish troops led by Field Marshal Lennart Torstensson attacked Danish Jutland from Germany, while Field Marshal Gustav Horn was in charge of the troops that attacked Scania.

In July 1644, Andries Bicker and Jacob de Witt were sent as envoys to Oxenstierna and the queen to mediate between Sweden and Denmark. Oxenstierna spoke High German, Christina Dutch. The outcome of the war was decided in the naval Battle of Fehmarn (1644) in October when the Royal Swedish Navy decisively defeated the Danish Navy. The defeat of the Danish Navy left the Danish isles open to a Swedish invasion, and Denmark sued for peace. The end of the war rested on the power of the Dutch naval dominance by Admiral Witte de With who arrived in the Sound in July to support the Dutch and Swedish point of view, a free passage. Oxenstierna was personally involved in the negotiations leading to the Treaty of Brömsebro at a creek in Blekinge. Sweden gained Gotland, Saaremaa (Ösel), Jämtland, Härjedalen and for thirty years Halland. Sweden had unrestricted access to the North Sea and was no longer encircled by Denmark–Norway. Shortly after the peace treaty, Oxenstierna was created Count of Södermöre.

==== Queen Christina and her abdication ====
When Christina came of age, she tried to push Oxenstierna, her old mentor, aside. The relations between the two were not good and Oxenstierna always attributed the exiguousness of Sweden's gains under the Peace of Westphalia − Sweden gained only Western Pomerania, Usedom, Wollin, Wismar and Bremen-Verden − following the conference in Osnabrück to Christina's undue interference. When the queen, a few years later, wanted to abdicate, Oxenstierna at first opposed this because he feared mischief to Sweden from the unruly and adventurous disposition of her preferred successor, Charles X Gustav. The chancellor changed his mind about Charles Gustav, however, and gave Christina the help she needed to go through with her abdication. Oxenstierna died two months after the ascension of the new king.

== Death ==
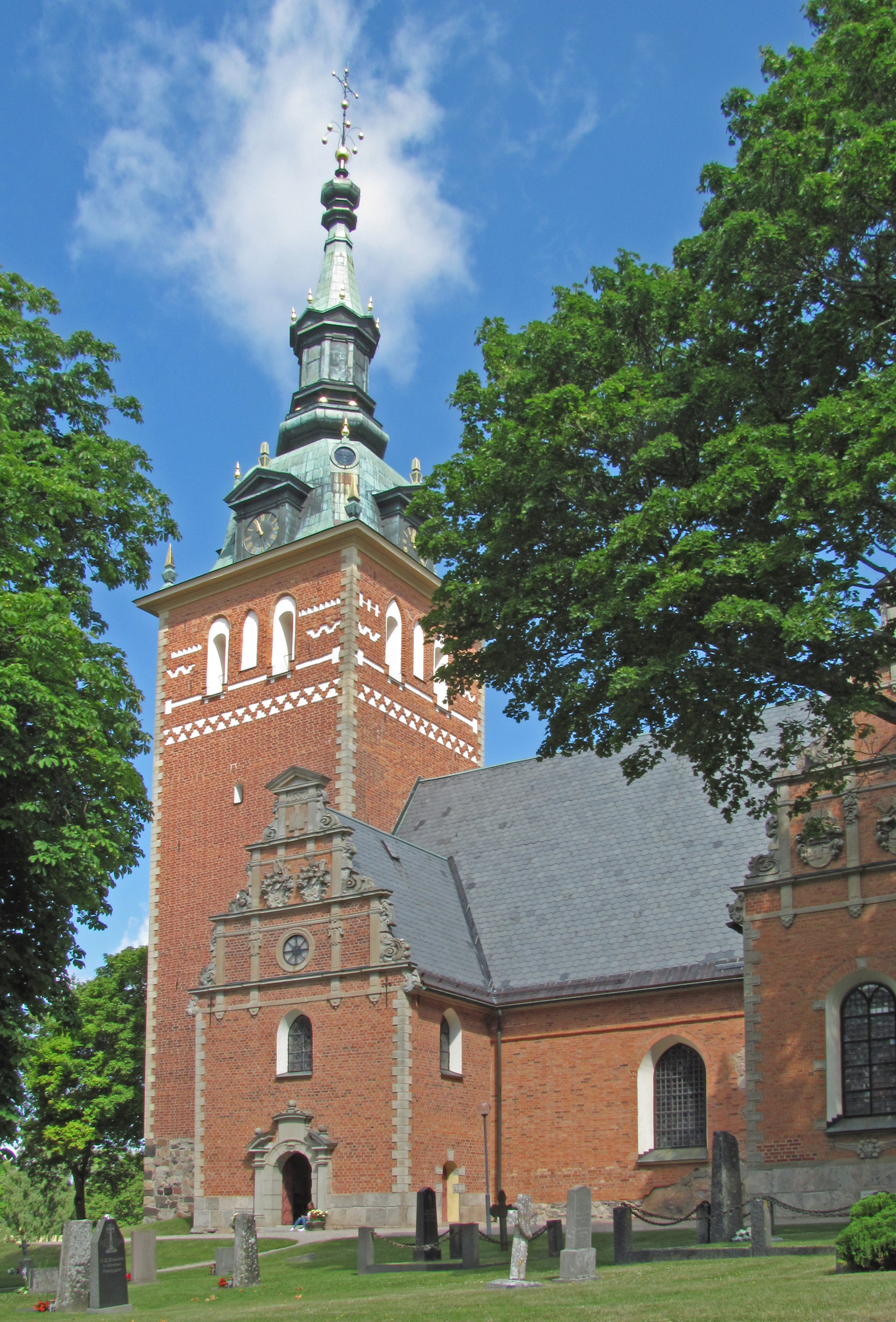
Oxenstierna is interred in the family burial vault in Jäder Church, north-east of Eskilstuna.

Oxenstierna died in Stockholm on 28 August 1654. He was interred in Stockholm's Storkyrkan on 18 March 1655. His body was then moved to Jäder Church close to the Oxenstierna estate at Fiholm, in present-day Eskilstuna Municipality, where a vault had been built in accordance with his wishes. In the vault, Oxenstiernska gravvalvet, several members of the Oxenstierna family have been buried, including Axel and his spouse Anna.

== Personal life ==
=== Family ===
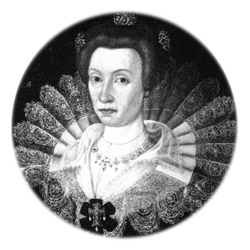
Anna Åkesdotter Bååt

On 5 June 1608, Axel Oxenstierna married Anna Åkesdotter Bååt (December 1579 – 26 June 1649), a daughter of nobleman Åke Johansson Bååt and Christina Trolle. The wedding took place at Fiholm Castle, which was owned by the Oxenstierna family. Anna was constantly pregnant during her marriage, giving birth to 13 children in just 15 years, of which only five survived early childhood:

1. Gustaf (29 March 1609 – 1629), the oldest child, became a chamberlain.
2. Johan (born and died 17 June 1610).
3. Johan (24 June 1611 – 5 December 1657), named after his deceased brother, became a privy councillor.
4. Christina (29 June 1612 – 8 August 1631), married Gustav Horn, Field Marshal and Lord High Constable.
5. Catharina (29 June 1612 – 25 June 1661), twin with Christina, married Johan Jespersson Cruus.
6. Beata (22 November 1613 – 15 January 1617).
7. Barbro (12 February 1615 – 21 June 1617).
8. Åke (March 1616 – 1617).
9. Son (1617), either stillborn or died immediately after birth.
10. Maria (born and died August 1618).
11. Gabriel (born and died March 1620).
12. Jakob (30 July 1621 – August 1621).
13. Erik (13 January 1624 – 23 October 1656), served as a Lord High Chancellor after the death of his father Axel in 1654.

=== Properties ===
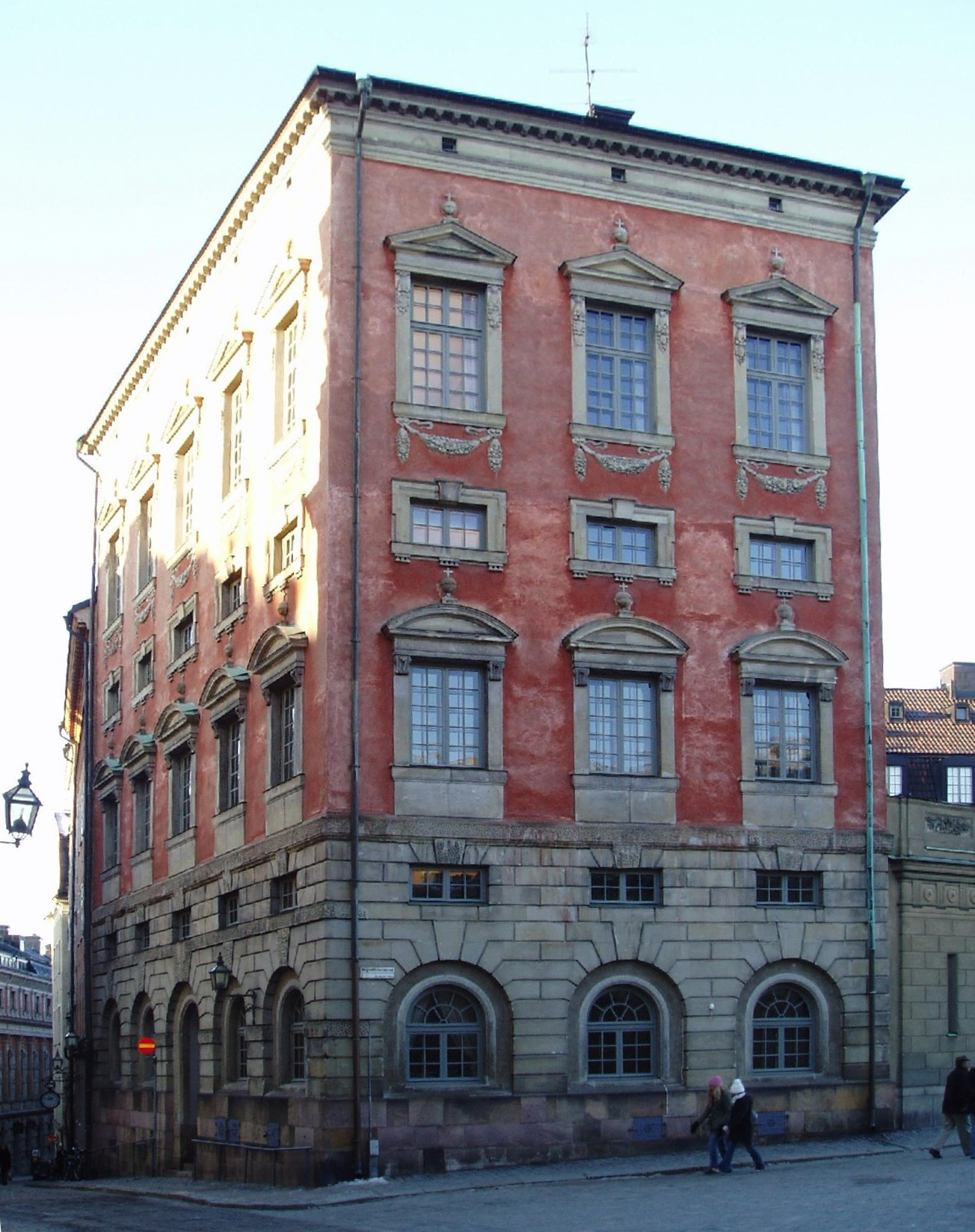
Oxenstiernska Palace

Oxenstierna was in possession of large estates and many mansions. During his life he owned palaces in several places, including Estonia Otepää, in Latvia Burtnieki, Ropaži and Valmiera, in Finland Nousiainen (Nousis) and in Stockholm (Oxenstiernska Palace). The foremost of the mansions was Tidö Castle in Västmanland. In 1647, Wallonian merchant Louis De Geer, who had returned from a Swedish trading expedition to West Africa, gifted four enslaved Africans to Oxenstierna.

== Impact and legacy ==
=== The modernisation of Sweden ===
Axel Oxenstierna is perhaps most remembered for the establishment of a uniform administrative system. He was ever-present during the vast reforms of the 1610s and 1620s, when the Swedish government was hugely modernised and made more effective. This was necessary for the war policies that would build the Swedish Empire. Among the areas reformed were army and navy organisation and recruiting, trade and industrial policies, regional and local administration, the system of higher education, and the judicial system. The boundaries of the administrative counties of Sweden still to a large extent follow the boundaries established by Oxenstierna in the 17th century.

=== Relationship with King Gustavus Adolphus ===
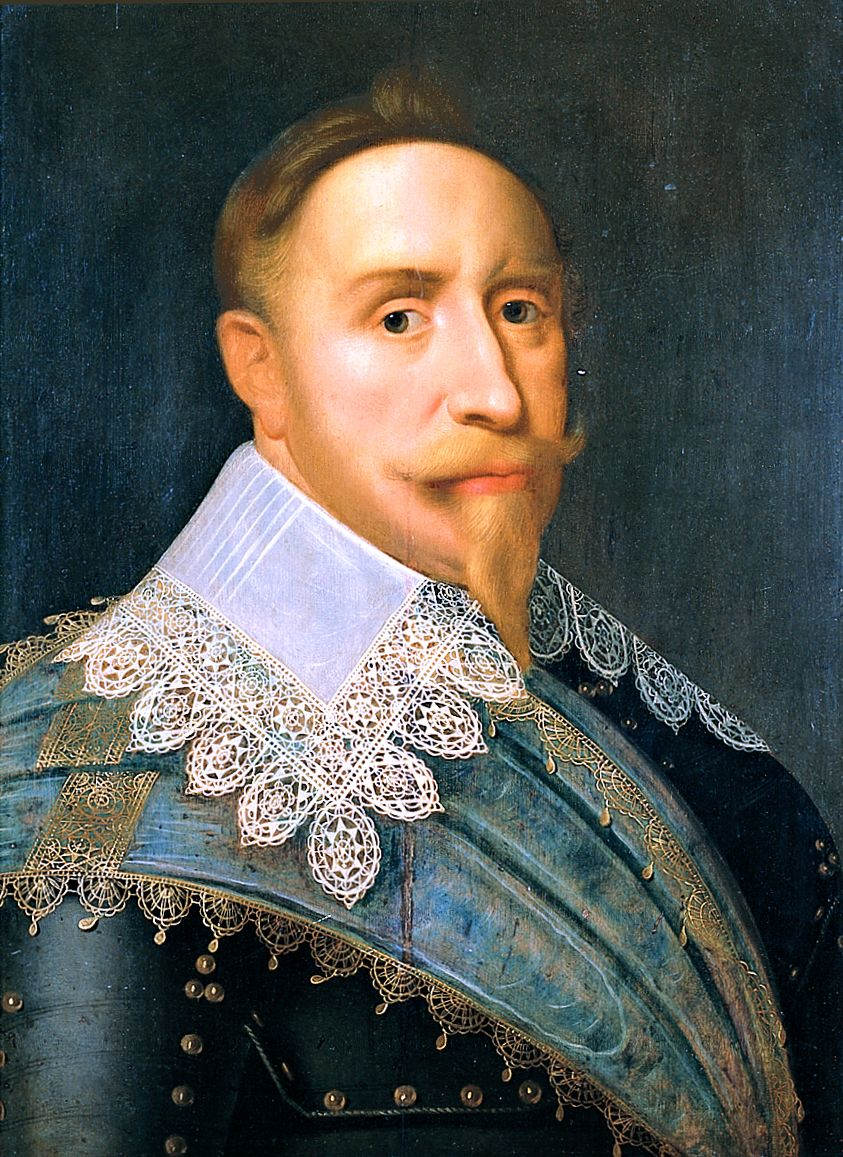
King Gustavus Adolphus of Sweden

Oxenstierna would not have had such an impact unless he had won the king's trust. From 1612, when Oxenstierna was appointed Lord High Chancellor, until 1632, when King Gustavus Adolphus died, the two men struck a long and successful partnership. They seem to have complemented each other. With Oxenstierna's own words, his "cool" balanced the king's "heat". More than once, the chancellor had to realise plans of the king, plans that sometimes were highly spontaneous and far from ready to be implemented in reality. When it came to entering the Thirty Years' War, Oxenstierna was not as enthusiastic as the king, but since the king's will was decisive, Oxenstierna accommodated himself to Gustavus's wish. At times, Oxenstierna stepped in to ease tense relations that the harsh behaviour of the king had caused. He regularly received the highest praise for his work from the king and there was almost no area in which King Gustavus did not consult his Lord High Chancellor Oxenstierna.

=== Instrument of Government of 1634 ===
The Chancellor made large contributions to the Standing orders of the House of Knights (riddarhusordning) of 1626. After the death of Gustavus Adolphus, Oxenstierna was the mind behind the Instrument of Government of 1634, in which, for example, the organisation of the five Great Officers of the Realm was clarified. Five governmental branches, of which the Great Officers became heads, were established. Oxenstierna pushed through the Instrument of Government, but not without opposition. He claimed that the new form of government reflected the will of the late King Gustavus, making himself the interpreter of the king's thoughts and wishes, and leaving the opposition no possibility to control the truth in this.

=== Opinions ===
Oxenstierna is regarded as a brilliant pragmatist, willing to reconsider his positions. There are examples of discussions within the Privy Council when Oxenstierna rejected laws he himself had earlier introduced, admitting that he knew better now. His way of examining, reconsidering, testing, and sometimes rejecting his earlier opinions constitutes his legacy more than his ideas on particular points of policy.

When he discovered that there were too few young noblemen to staff governmental positions, he worked to make it easier for boys outside the noble families to gain higher education, and gave them the possibility, eventually, to be raised to the nobility themselves. He could therefore be considered the father of Swedish meritocracy.

Oxenstierna supported mercantilist economic policies and encouraged skilled artisans, merchants and entrepreneurs from abroad to settle in Sweden to strengthen its economy and administration. He also advocated allowing members of other religious denominations to reside peacefully in Sweden, despite opposition from the Lutheran clergy.

In Germany, Oxenstierna became a fear-evoking character in a derived version of the popular German lullaby Schlaf, Kindlein, Schlaf!, in which he is referred to as "Ochsenstern".

=== Reception ===
Dutch jurist and philosopher Hugo Grotius considered Oxenstierna "the greatest man of the century". French Cardinal Richelieu called him "an inexhaustible source of fine advice", while Richelieu's successor, Cardinal Mazarin, said that if all ministers of Europe were on the same ship, the helm would be handed to Oxenstierna. Pope Urban VIII claimed that Oxenstierna was one of the most excellent men the world had seen.

== Quotation ==
An nescis, mi fili, quantilla prudentia mundus regatur? "Do you not know, my son, with how very little wisdom the world is governed?"

— In a letter to his son Johan written in 1648.

Although attributed to Oxenstierna, the pope Julius III (1487-1555) is regarded to have been the first recorded author. Cardinal Richelieu has also been attributed to have been the author. This is probably the most famous Latin quotation of a Swede in the English-speaking world. The words were intended to encourage his son, a delegate to the negotiations that would lead to the Peace of Westphalia, who worried about his ability to hold his own amidst experienced and eminent statesmen and diplomats.

== In fiction ==
=== Film and TV ===
Oxenstierna has been portrayed on the stage and on the screen several times, mainly due to his role as mentor and guardian to the enigmatic Queen Christina. He was played by Lewis Stone in Rouben Mamoulian's 1933 Hollywood movie Queen Christina, with Greta Garbo as the female lead role, by Cyril Cusack in Anthony Harvey's The Abdication (1974) and by Michael Nyqvist in Mika Kaurismäki's The Girl King (2015).

=== On stage ===
Samuel Ahlgren played Oxenstierna in Drottning Kristina (1790), by the King Gustav III of Sweden who was an active playwright.

In August Strindberg's 1901 play Kristina, Oxenstierna is portrayed as a cold realist criticising Christina's extravagant lifestyle and her gifts to favourites.

The bass part of Oxenstierna was first performed by Giovanni Carlo Casanova in Jacopo Foroni's 1849 opera Cristina, regina di Svezia.

=== Literature ===
Oxenstierna figures prominently in the Ring of Fire anthology Eric Flint and his 2011 novel 1636: The Saxon Uprising.

== See also ==
- Swedish Empire
- Dominions of Sweden
- Axel Oxenstierna palace

== Notes ==
Political offices
Preceded by Svante Turesson Bielke	Realm Chancellor of Sweden; 1612–1654	Succeeded by Erik Oxenstierna
Government offices
Preceded by ?	Governor-General of Riga; 1622–1626	Succeeded by ?
Preceded by New title	Governor-General of Prussia; 1626–1631	Succeeded by Office abolished
Titles of nobility
New title	Count of Södermöre; 1st creation 1645–1654	Succeeded by Johan Oxenstierna
New title	Baron of Kimito; 1st creation 1614–1654	Succeeded by Johan Oxenstierna
