= Axel Oxenstierna palace =

Building in Stockholm, Sweden

Coordinates: 59°19′33.22″N 18°04′10.57″E

Axel Oxenstierna palace

Axel Oxenstierna palace (Swedish: Axel Oxenstiernas palats) is a Mannerist architecture–style building situated in the Old Town of Stockholm, Sweden.

== History ==
Designed by the architect Jean de la Vallée (c. 1620–1696) for Chancellor Axel Oxenstierna (1583–1654) and began construction in 1653. The palace became the headquarters for the 1668–1680 Swedish Central Bank.

The palace is well conserved in particular with regard to the exterior. The building also has a well-preserved interior with basically an original floor plan. The building has been a state monument since 1935. The facade was renovated in 2013 by the Swedish Property Agency. An earlier refurbishment of the premises was carried out in 1993–94.

== Gallery ==
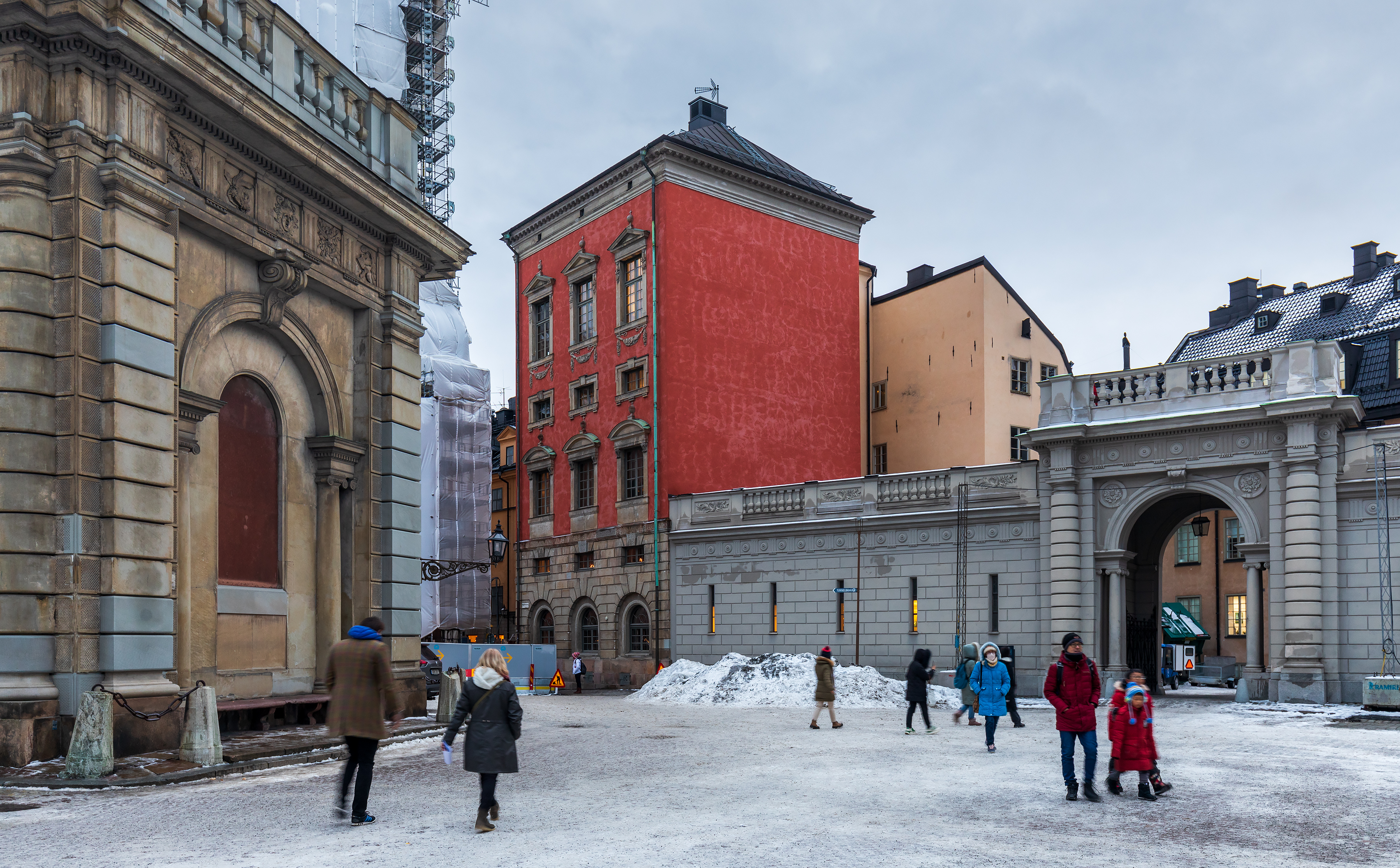

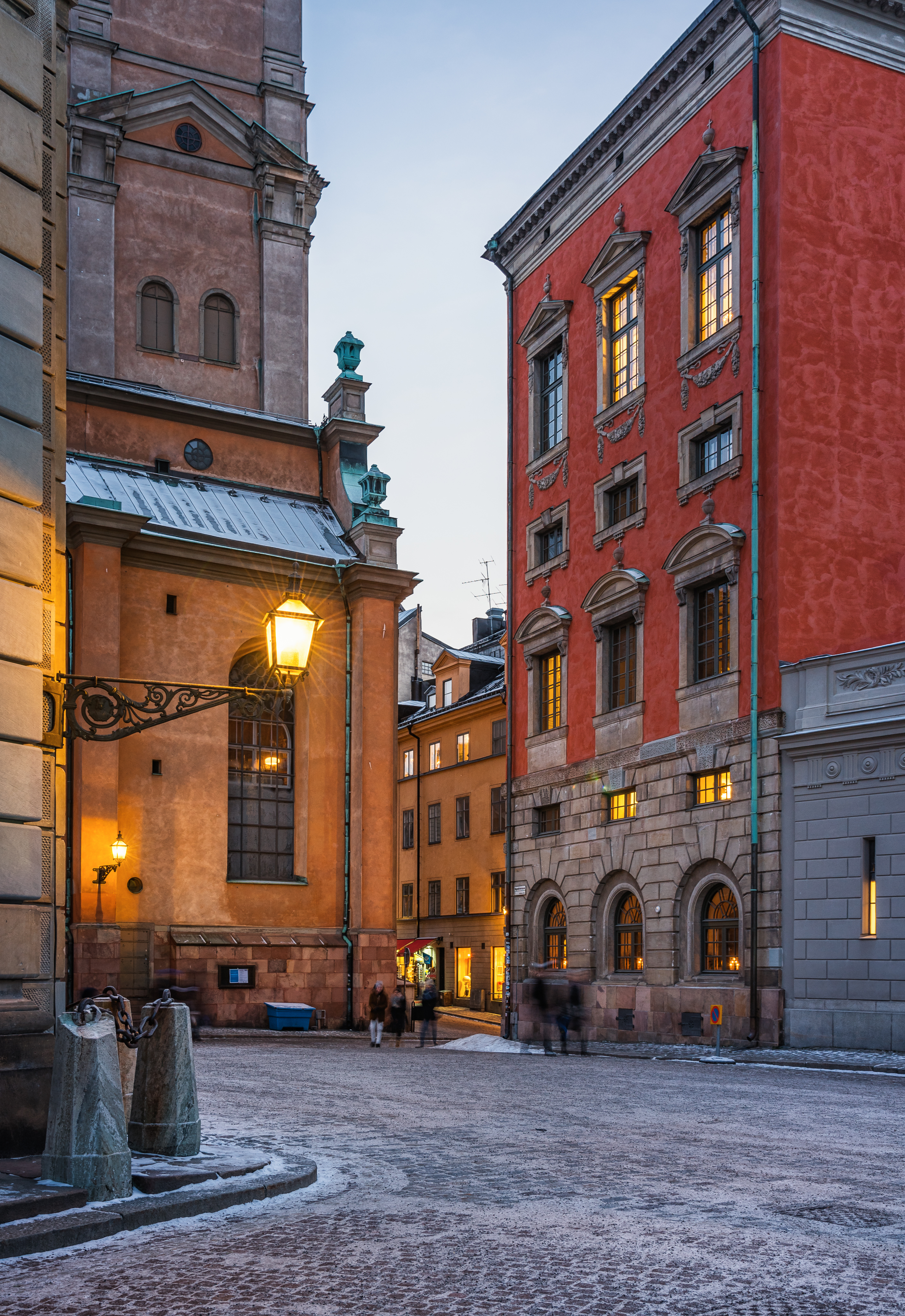

== See also ==
- Axel Oxenstierna

== Other sources ==
- Ohlsson, Martin A. (1951) Axel Oxenstiernas palats (Stockholm: Forum bokförlag)
