= Lord High Chancellor of Sweden =

Prominent public office in Sweden from 1538 to 1799

- State Coat of arms

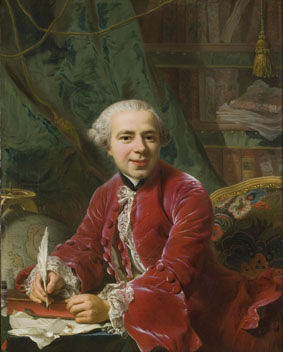
- Fredrik Sparre, the last officeholder
- Style: Excellency
- Residence: Oxenstierna Palace
- Appointer: Monarch of Sweden
- Formation: 1 August 1538
- First holder: Conrad von Pyhy
- Final holder: Fredrik Sparre
- Abolished: 14 December 1799

The Lord High Chancellor (Swedish: Rikskansler, lit. 'Chancellor of the Realm') was the effective head of government in Sweden, from 1538 to 1799, with periods of vacancy. The office holder was a member, and typically the leader, of the Privy Council. From 1634, the Lord High Chancellor was one of five Great Officers of the Realm, who were the most prominent members of the Privy Council and each presided over a branch of government—the Lord High Chancellor headed the Privy Council, making him the leader of the executive. In 1792, more than a century after the office's abolition in 1680, it was revived, but was then finally abolished again seven years later in 1799.

== Origins ==
During the Middle Ages, from the 13th century, the "chancellor of the King" was a close confidant of the King. The chancellor was often a cleric, inasmuch as that class were the most educated, and one part of his duty was to aid the King during negotiations with foreign powers. In 1560, during King Eric XIV's reign, Nils Gyllenstierna became the first to receive the title Rikskansler.

== Function ==
The Lord High Chancellor was appointed by the King and was assigned to ensure that the orders of the King and the Riksdag of the Estates were followed. Over time, the complexity of government increased beyond the Chancellor’s ability to manage it alone; thus, a cabinet, the Privy Council, had to be established. In 1634, the five Great Officers of the Realm were introduced as the chief Privy Councilors. Though notionally fourth in rank among these, the Lord High Chancellor became the most important figure in the Privy Council of Sweden. The Chancellor was responsible for maintaining relations with foreign powers. Axel Oxenstierna possessed massive influence during his tenure as Chancellor (1612–1654), when he became the effective head of government and functional leader of the Swedish Empire.

== Abolition and revival of the office ==
In 1680, King Charles XI abolished the office and inaugurated a new position instead – "President of the Chancellery" (Swedish: Kanslipresident). In 1792, during the minority reign of King Gustav IV Adolf the office of Rikskansler was revived, but it was abolished once again in 1799.

== Lord High Chancellors of Sweden ==
=== First creation ===
Portrait	Name	Lifespan	Term began	Term ended	Monarch(s)
	Conrad von Pyhy	c. 1500 – 1553	1 August 1538	1543	Gustav I
	Nils Gyllenstierna	1526 – 1601 (aged 74–75)	1560	1590	Eric XIV (1560–1568) John III (1568–1590)
	Erik Sparre	13 July 1550 – 20 March 1600 (aged 49)	1593	20 March 1600	Sigismund Vasa (1593–1599) Charles IX (1599–1600)
	Svante Bielke	1567 – 2 July 1609 (aged 41–42)	1602	2 July 1609	Charles IX
	Axel Oxenstierna	16 June 1583 – 28 August 1654 (aged 71)	6 January 1612	28 August 1654	Gustav II Adolph (1612–1632) Christina (1632–1654)
	Erik Oxenstierna	13 February 1624 – 23 October 1656 (aged 32)	28 August 1654	23 October 1656	Charles X Gustav
	Magnus Gabriel De la Gardie	15 October 1622 – 26 April 1686 (aged 63)	13 February 1660	10 June 1680	Charles XI

=== Second creation ===
Portrait	Name	Lifespan	Term began	Term ended	Monarch(s)
	Fredrik Sparre	2 February 1731 – 30 January 1803 (aged 71)	16 July 1792	14 December 1799	Gustav IV Adolph

== See also ==
- King in Council (Sweden)
- Prime Minister of Sweden
- List of prime ministers of Sweden
