= Fiholm Castle =

Fiholm, Landed Estate of
- Sweden
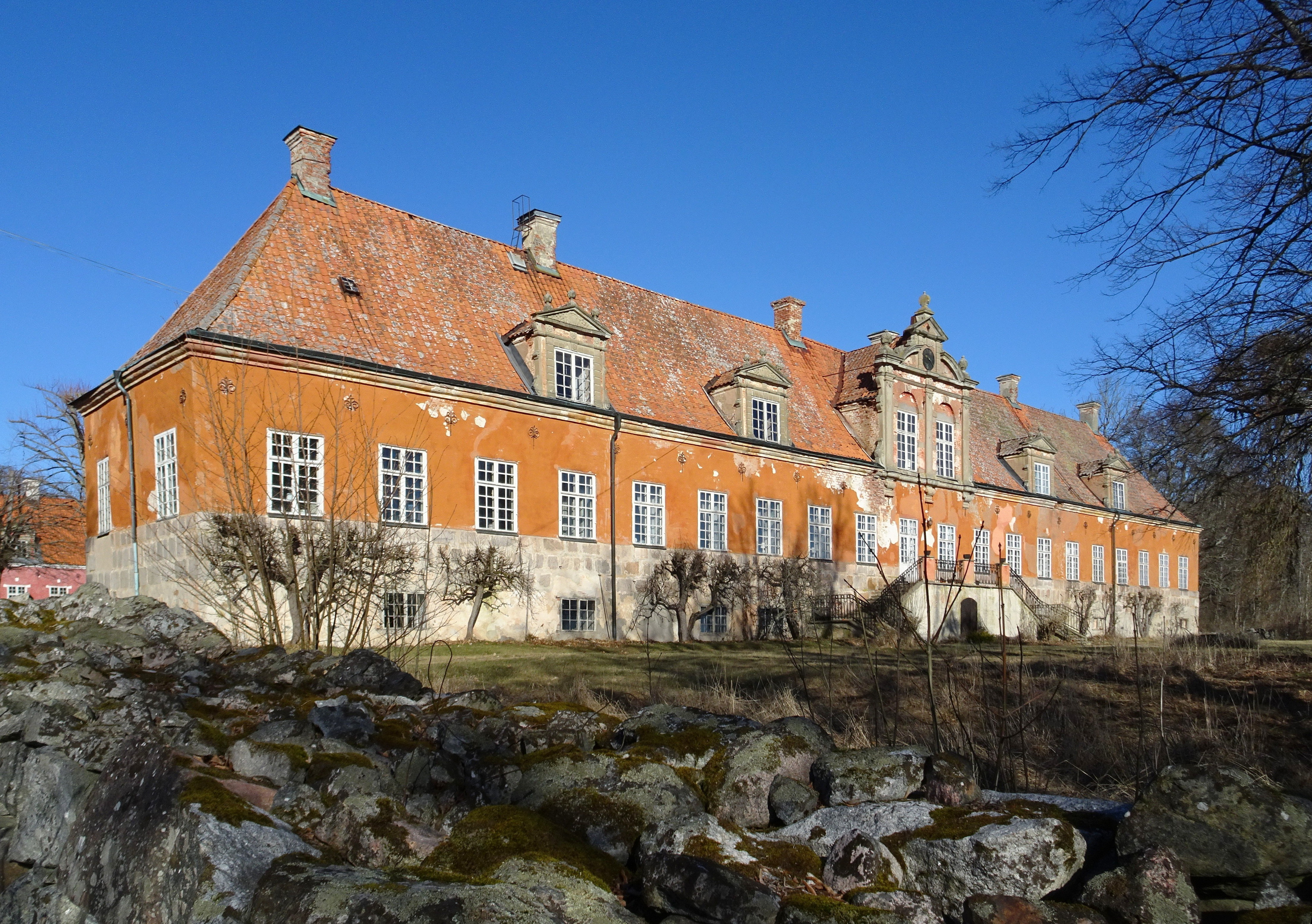

Site information
- Type: Manor, Landed Estate

Location
- Coordinates: 59°26′02″N 16°44′33″E

Fiholm Manor is a Landed Estate located approximately 20 km West of Eskilstuna in Eskilstuna Municipality, Södermanland County, Sweden. It is privately owned.

The Landed Estate of Fiholm was commissioned by the Swedish statesman Axel Oxenstierna in 1640 to the plans of the French architect Simon de Vallée. The two standing buildings (wings) were drawn up in a French-Dutch Renaissance style and completed in 1642, representing some of the finest kept examples of fine Swedish architecture of that period. Construction works at Fiholm were overseen by the elder Nikodemus Tessin, then only 25 years old, and the intention was that the two standing buildings should become wings to a magnificent stately Manor House. The Manor House was never realised.

The nearby located Jäder Church was built by Oxenstierna at the same time, and can through its grandeur indicate what might have been. Jäders kyrka remains to this day the burial church for the Oxenstierna family.

== See also ==
- List of castles and palaces in Sweden
