= Frederick Louis, Count Palatine of Zweibrücken =

Frederick Louis
- Count Palatine of Zweibrucken
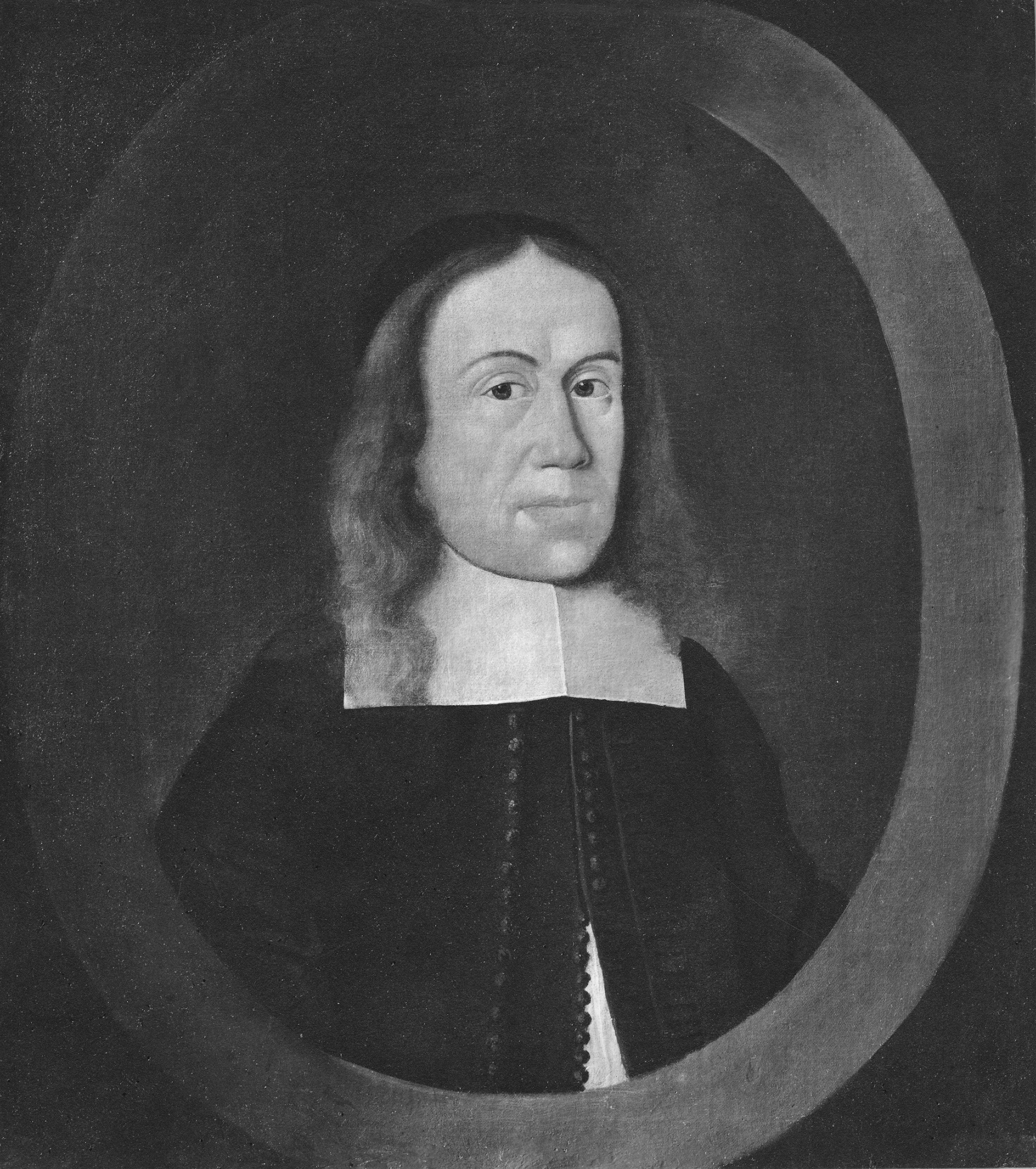
- Born: 27 October 1619; Heidelberg
- Died: 11 April 1681 (aged 61); Landsberg Castle, Obermoschel
- Noble family: House of Wittelsbach
- Spouses: Juliana Magdalena of Palatinate-Zweibrücken; Anna Marie Elisabeth Hepp
- Father: Frederick Casimir, Count Palatine of Zweibrücken-Landsberg
- Mother: Countess Emilia Antwerpiana of Nassau

Frederick Louis (German: Friedrich Ludwig; 27 October 1619 – 11 April 1681) was the Duke of Landsberg from 1645 until 1681, and the Count Palatine of Zweibrücken from 1661 until 1681.

== Life ==
Frederick Louis was born in Heidelberg in 1619 as the only surviving son of Frederick Casimir, Count Palatine of Zweibrücken-Landsberg. After his father's death in 1645, Frederick Louis inherited his territories devastated by the Thirty Years' War. To a limited extent he contributed to the reconstruction efforts and he promoted trade to stabilise the situation. In 1661 he inherited the Duchy of Zweibrücken, another territory devastated by the war, following the death of Frederick, Count Palatine of Zweibrücken. He died at Landsberg Castle, near Obermoschel, in 1681. With the sons and grandsons of his first marriage predeceased and the sons of his second morganatic marriage illegitimate, he was succeeded by King Charles XI of Sweden.

== Marriage ==
Frederick Louis married his first cousin, Juliana Magdalena of Palatinate-Zweibrücken (23 April 1621 - 25 March 1672), daughter of Duke John II, on 14 November 1645 in Düsseldorf and had the following children:

1. Charles Frederick (12 September 1646 - 22 October 1646)
2. William Louis (23 February 1648 - 31 August 1675), married his first cousin Charlotte Frederica of Palatinate-Zweibrücken; they had three children:
  1. Charles Louis (18 August 1673 - 11 November 1674)
  2. William Christian (5 July 1674 - 28 November 1674)
  3. Wilhelmine Sophie (27 July 1675 - 5 November 1675)
3. A daughter (28 December 1648 - 1 January 1649)
4. A son (9 January 1650 - 12 January 1650)
5. Gustavus John (11 January 1651 - 25 February 1652)
6. A daughter (born and died 15 April 1652)
7. Charlotte Amalie (24 May 1653 - 8 August 1707), married Count John Phillip of Isenburg-Offenbach
8. Louise Magdalena (17 June 1654 - 11 February 1672)
9. Maria Sophie (13 August 1655 - 8 October 1687)
10. Elizabeth Christine (27 October 1656 - 29 August 1707), married firstly Count Emich XIV of Leiningen-Dagsburg and secondly Christoph Frederick, Burgrave and Count of Dohna-Lauck
11. Charles Casimir (6 August 1658 - 14 September 1673)
12. Juliana Eleanore (27 June 1661 - 12 February 1662)
13. John (11 February 1662 - 25 January 1665)

Frederick Louis morganatically married Anna Marie Elisabeth Hepp (c. 1635 - 8 March 1722) on 21 August 1672 and had the following children:

1. William Frederick of Fürstenwärther (12 October 1673 - 3 April 1732)
2. Charles Aemilius of Fürstenwärther (28 November 1674 - 21 April 1758), married twice and leave descendants
3. Louis Philip of Fürstenwärther (10 May 1676 - 26 February 1724)
4. A son (born and died 10 May 1677)
5. Maria Elizabeth of Fürstenwärther (2 January 1679 - 1680/1)

== Ancestors ==
Frederick Louis's ancestors in three generations
Frederick Louis, Count Palatine of Zweibrücken	Father: Frederick Casimir, Count Palatine of Zweibrücken-Landsberg	Paternal Grandfather: John I, Count Palatine of Zweibrücken	Paternal Great-grandfather: Wolfgang, Count Palatine of Zweibrücken
Frederick Louis, Count Palatine of Zweibrücken	Father: Frederick Casimir, Count Palatine of Zweibrücken-Landsberg	Paternal Grandfather: John I, Count Palatine of Zweibrücken	Paternal Great-grandmother: Anna of Hesse
Frederick Louis, Count Palatine of Zweibrücken	Father: Frederick Casimir, Count Palatine of Zweibrücken-Landsberg	Paternal Grandmother: Magdalene of Jülich-Cleves-Berg	Paternal Great-grandfather: Wilhelm, Duke of Jülich-Cleves-Berg
Frederick Louis, Count Palatine of Zweibrücken	Father: Frederick Casimir, Count Palatine of Zweibrücken-Landsberg	Paternal Grandmother: Magdalene of Jülich-Cleves-Berg	Paternal Great-grandmother: Maria of Habsburg, Archduchess of Austria
Frederick Louis, Count Palatine of Zweibrücken	Mother: Emilia Antwerpiana of Nassau	Maternal Grandfather: William the Silent	Maternal Great-grandfather: William I, Count of Nassau-Siegen
Frederick Louis, Count Palatine of Zweibrücken	Mother: Emilia Antwerpiana of Nassau	Maternal Grandfather: William the Silent	Maternal Great-grandmother: Juliana of Stolberg
Frederick Louis, Count Palatine of Zweibrücken	Mother: Emilia Antwerpiana of Nassau	Maternal Grandmother: Charlotte of Bourbon	Maternal Great-grandfather: Louis III de Bourbon, Duke of Montpensier
Frederick Louis, Count Palatine of Zweibrücken	Mother: Emilia Antwerpiana of Nassau	Maternal Grandmother: Charlotte of Bourbon	Maternal Great-grandmother: Jacqueline de Longwy

Frederick Louis, Count Palatine of Zweibrücken House of Wittelsbach Born: 27 October 1619 Died: 11 April 1681
Preceded by Frederick Casimir	Duke of Landsberg; 1645–1681	Succeeded by Charles I
Preceded by Frederick	Duke of Zweibrücken; 1661–1681	Succeeded by Charles I
