= Frederick, Count Palatine of Zweibrücken =

17th Century Count Palatine and Duke of Zweibrucken

Frederick, Count Palatine of Zweibrucken
- Born: 5 April 1616; Zweibrücken
- Died: 9 July 1661 (aged 45); Nohfelden
- Noble family: Wittelsbach
- Spouse: Anne of Nassau-Dillenburg
- Father: John II, Count Palatine of Zweibrücken
- Mother: Louise Juliana of the Palatinate

Frederick (German: Friedrich; 5 April 1616 – 9 July 1661) was the Duke of Zweibrücken from 1635 until 1661.

== Life ==
Frederick was born in Zweibrücken in 1616 as the elder son of John II, Count Palatine of Zweibrücken. He succeeded his father in 1635. During his reign, Palatinate-Zweibrücken was devastated during the Thirty Years' War.

The population of the duchy had decreased to a mere tenth of the population during the turn of the Century. Most of his castles were destroyed and he spent most of his reign moving between residences. In 1650 he settled for a few years in Castle Kirkel after its reconstruction. He carefully attempted to rebuild his shattered duchy.

Frederick died in Veldenz Castle in 1661 and is buried alongside other counts/dukes of the house's line, in the crypt of Alexander's Church (Alexanderskirche) in Zweibrücken, built in 1493 by his ancestor Alexander, Count Palatine of Zweibrücken. Without any male heirs, the elder branch of the House of Palatinate-Zweibrücken became extinct. Palatinate-Zweibrücken was inherited by Frederick Louis.

== Marriage ==
Frederick married Countess Anna Juliane of Nassau-Saarbrücken (1617–1667), daughter of Count William Louis, on 6 April 1640 and had the following children:

1. William Louis (23 March 1641 – 9 May 1642)
2. Elizabeth (1 April 1642 – 17 April 1677) – married to Victor Amadeus, Prince of Anhalt-Bernburg
3. Christine Louise Juliana (18 April 1643 – 21 July 1652)
4. Frederick Louis (23 November 1644 – 12 June 1645)
5. Sophie Amalie (15 December 1646 – 30 December 1695), married John Charles, Count Palatine of Gelnhausen.
6. Eleanore Augusta (15 March 1648 – 16 November 1658)
7. Charles Gustavus (23 May 1649 – 15 February 1650)
8. Catherine Charlotte (22 February 1651 – 10 July 1652)
9. Charlotte Fredericka (2 December 1653 – 27 October 1712)
10. unnamed son (18 April 1656)

== Ancestors ==
Frederick's ancestors in three generations
Frederick, Count Palatine of Zweibrücken	Father: John II, Count Palatine of Zweibrücken	Paternal Grandfather: John I, Count Palatine of Zweibrücken	Paternal Great-grandfather: Wolfgang, Count Palatine of Zweibrücken
Frederick, Count Palatine of Zweibrücken	Father: John II, Count Palatine of Zweibrücken	Paternal Grandfather: John I, Count Palatine of Zweibrücken	Paternal Great-grandmother: Anna of Hesse
Frederick, Count Palatine of Zweibrücken	Father: John II, Count Palatine of Zweibrücken	Paternal Grandmother: Magdalene of Jülich-Cleves-Berg	Paternal Great-grandfather: Wilhelm, Duke of Jülich-Cleves-Berg
Frederick, Count Palatine of Zweibrücken	Father: John II, Count Palatine of Zweibrücken	Paternal Grandmother: Magdalene of Jülich-Cleves-Berg	Paternal Great-grandmother: Maria of Habsburg, Archduchess of Austria
Frederick, Count Palatine of Zweibrücken	Mother: Louise Juliana of the Palatinate	Maternal Grandfather: Frederick IV, Elector Palatine	Maternal Great-grandfather: Louis VI, Elector Palatine
Frederick, Count Palatine of Zweibrücken	Mother: Louise Juliana of the Palatinate	Maternal Grandfather: Frederick IV, Elector Palatine	Maternal Great-grandmother: Elisabeth of Hesse
Frederick, Count Palatine of Zweibrücken	Mother: Louise Juliana of the Palatinate	Maternal Grandmother: Louise Juliana of Nassau	Maternal Great-grandfather: William the Silent
Frederick, Count Palatine of Zweibrücken	Mother: Louise Juliana of the Palatinate	Maternal Grandmother: Louise Juliana of Nassau	Maternal Great-grandmother: Charlotte of Bourbon

Frederick, Count Palatine of Zweibrücken House of Wittelsbach Born: 5 April 1616 Died: 9 July 1661
Preceded by John II	Duke of Zweibrücken; 1635–1661	Succeeded by Frederick Louis
