= Palatinate-Landsberg =

Palatinate-Landsberg; Pfalz-Landsberg
1604 - 1681
| Capital; Circle; Bench | Burg Landsberg; Upper Rhenish; Council of Princes |
| Partitioned from County Palatine of Zweibrücken | 1604 |
| Inherited Zweibrücken | 1661 |
| Extinct; to Sweden | 1681 |

Palatinate-Landsberg was a state of the Holy Roman Empire based around Landsberg Castle near Obermoschel, in southwestern Germany.

Palatinate-Landsberg was the intermediate partition of Palatinate-Zweibrücken in 1604 for Frederick Casimir, the youngest son of John I, Count Palatine of Zweibrücken. Landsberg was invaded and devastated during the Thirty Years' War. In 1645 Frederick Casimir was succeeded by his son Frederick Louis. Frederick Louis inherited the Duchy of Zweibrücken in 1661 with its seat in the Imperial Diet. After dying in 1681 without legitimate descendants, Palatinate-Landsberg passed to the Kings of Sweden.

| Name | Date | Notes |
|---|---|---|
| Frederick Casimir | 1604 - 1645 | |
| Frederick Louis | 1645 - 1681 | Count Palatine of Zweibrücken |
