= Frederick Casimir, Count Palatine of Zweibrücken-Landsberg =

Duke of Landsberg from 1604 to 1645

Frederick Casimir
- Count Palatine of Zweibrücken-Landsberg
- Born: 10 June 1585; Zweibrücken
- Died: 30 September 1645 (aged 60); Montfort-en-Auxois
- Buried: Alexanderkirche, Zweibrücken
- Noble family: House of Wittelsbach
- Spouse: Emilia Antwerpiana of Nassau
- Issue: Frederick Louis, Count Palatine of Zweibrücken
- Father: John I, Count Palatine of Zweibrücken
- Mother: Magdalene of Jülich-Cleves-Berg

Frederick Casimir (German: Friedrich Kasimir) (10 June 1585 – 30 September 1645) was the Duke of Landsberg from 1604 until 1645.

== Life ==
Frederick was born in Zweibrücken in 1585 as the second son of John I, Count Palatine of Zweibrücken and Magdalene of Jülich-Cleves-Berg. After his father's death in 1604, Frederick Casimir and his brothers partitioned his territories; Frederick Casimir received the territory around Landsberg Castle near Obermoschel.

In 1611 his late father's dispositions in his favour and that of his younger brother, Johann Casimir, were finally implemented, giving them, respectively, the appanages of Landsberg and Neukastell, reserving for their eldest brother most of Palatine Zweibrücken. He died in Montfort-en-Auxois in 1645 and is buried alongside other counts/dukes of the house's line, in the crypt of Alexander's Church (Alexanderskirche) in Zweibrücken, built in 1493 by his ancestor Alexander, Count Palatine of Zweibrücken.

== Family ==
Frederick Casimir married Countess Emilia Antwerpiana of Nassau (9 December 1581 – 28 September 1657), a daughter of William the Silent, Prince of Orange, on 4 July 1616 and had Frederick Louis, Count Palatine of Zweibrücken (27 October 1619 – 11 April 1681), his heir.

== Ancestors ==
Ancestors of Frederick Casimir, Count Palatine of Zweibrücken-Landsberg

16. Alexander, Count Palatine of Zweibrücken
8. Louis II, Count Palatine of Zweibrücken
17. Margarete of Hohenlohe-Neuenstein
4. Wolfgang, Count Palatine of Zweibrücken
18. William I, Landgrave of Hesse
9. Elisabeth of Hesse
19. Anna of Brunswick-Wolfenbüttel
2 .John I, Count Palatine of Zweibrücken
20. William II, Landgrave of Hesse
10. Philip I, Landgrave of Hesse
21. Anna of Mecklenburg-Schwerin
5. Anna of Hesse
22. George, Duke of Saxony
11. Christine of Saxony
23. Barbara Jagiellon
1. Frederick Casimir, Count Palatine of Zweibrücken-Landsberg
24. John II, Duke of Cleves
12. John III, Duke of Cleves
25. Matilda of Hesse
6. William, Duke of Jülich-Cleves-Berg
26. William IV, Duke of Jülich-Berg
13. Maria, Duchess of Jülich-Berg
27. Sibylle of Brandenburg
3. Magdalene of Jülich-Cleves-Berg
28. Philip I of Castile
14. Ferdinand I, Holy Roman Emperor
29. Joanna of Castile
7. Archduchess Maria of Austria
30. Vladislaus II of Bohemia and Hungary
15. Anna of Bohemia and Hungary
31. Anne de Foix

Frederick Casimir, Count Palatine of Zweibrücken-Landsberg House of Wittelsbach Born: 10 June 1585 Died: 30 September 1645
Preceded by John II	Duke of Landsberg; 1604–1645	Succeeded by Frederick Louis
