= Countess Charlotte Flandrina of Nassau =

French abbess

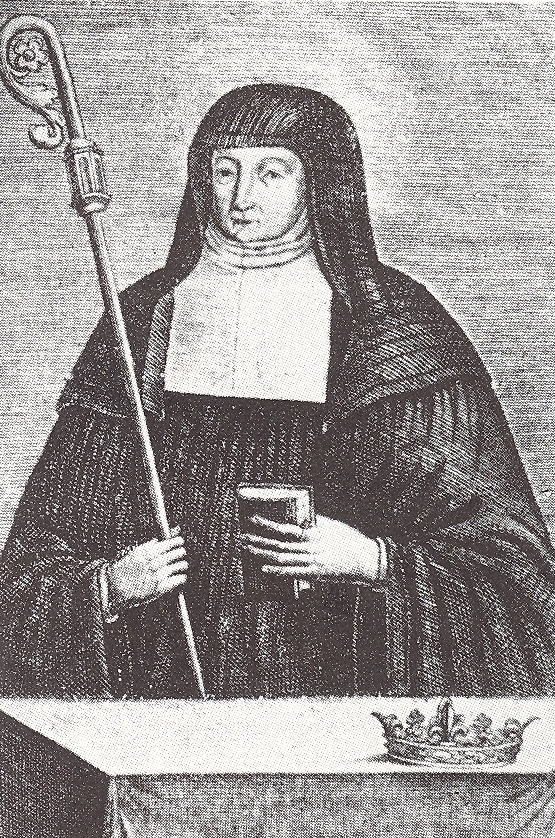
17th-century illustration of Charlotte Flandrina

Countess Charlotte Flandrina of Nassau (18 August 1579 in Antwerp – 16 April 1640 in St.Croix (near Poitiers)) was a French abbess. She was the fourth daughter of William the Silent and his third spouse Charlotte of Bourbon.

== Biography ==
After her mother's death in 1582, her French grandfather asked for Charlotte Flandrina to stay with him.

Against the will of her paternal family, she was raised to become a Catholic nun by her maternal aunt Jeanne de Bourbon, abbess of Jouarre de Ste. Croix in Poitiers, and became a nun in 1595, succeeding her aunt as abbess in 1605.

She spent her life in the convent, tending to religion and religious charity. She maintained a correspondence with her stepmother and her sisters, and while she sometimes attempted to convert them, their relationship was a good one, and her sisters Elisabeth Flandrika and Charlotte Brabantina sometimes visited her.

== Ancestry ==
Ancestors of Countess Charlotte Flandrina of Nassau

8. John V, Count of Nassau-Siegen
4. William I, Count of Nassau-Siegen
9. Elisabeth of Hesse-Marburg
2. William the Silent
10. Bodo III, Count of Stolberg-Wernigerode
5. Juliana of Stolberg-Wernigerode
11. Anna of Eppstein-Königstein
1. Charlotte Flandrina of Nassau
12. Louis, Prince of La Roche-sur-Yon
6. Louis, Duke of Montpensier
13. Louise de Bourbon, Duchess of Montpensier
3. Charlotte of Bourbon
14. Jean de Longwy
7. Jacqueline de Longwy
15. Jeanne of Angoulême
