= Countess Emilia Antwerpiana of Nassau =

Countess Emilia Antwerpiana
- Countess Palatine of Zweibrücken-Landsberg
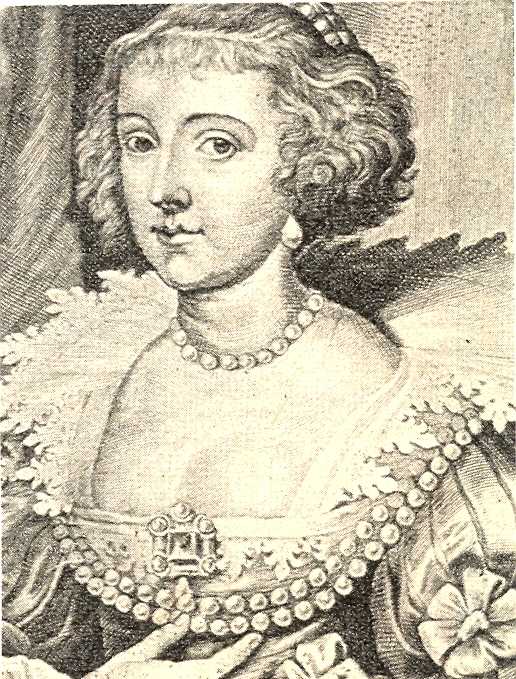
- Countess Emilia Antwerpiana of Nassau
- Born: December 9, 1581; Antwerp
- Died: 28 September 1657 (aged 75); Landsberg
- Noble family: House of Orange-Nassau (by birth); House of Wittelsbach (by marriage)
- Spouse: Frederick Casimir, Count Palatine of Zweibrücken-Landsberg
- Issue: Frederick Louis
- Father: William the Silent
- Mother: Charlotte of Bourbon

Countess Emilia Antwerpiana of Nassau (Antwerp, 9 December 1581 - Landsberg, 28 September 1657) was the sixth and youngest daughter of William the Silent and his third wife, Charlotte of Bourbon.

== Biography ==
Emilia Antwerpiana was her father's last surviving daughter. When her elder sister Louise Juliane married in 1593, she went to live with her in Heidelberg. She was neither beautiful nor did she have any money, and therefore remained unmarried until a later age than was normal for princesses at the time.

On 4 July 1616, Emilia Antwerpiana married Frederick Casimir, Count Palatine of Zweibrücken-Landsberg (1585–1645) and settled with him in Landsberg.

In 1621, Emilia Antwerpiana and Frederick Casimir had to flee Landberg for Strasbourg during the Thirty Years' War. The flight caused long standing economic problems, and for many years she tried to get access to her inheritance and asked her siblings for money. Her sister Charlotte Brabantine finally arranged for her to live at the castle Montfort in France.

She was finally able to return to Landberg after the Peace of Westphalia in 1648.

== Issue ==
She had three children:

- Frederick (1617-1617) Died one day after birth
- Frederick Louis (1619-1681) Married to Juliana Magdalena of Palatinate-Zweibrücken
- Charles Henry (1622-1623) Died as a child

== Ancestry ==
Ancestors of Countess Emilia Antwerpiana of Nassau

8. John V, Count of Nassau-Siegen
4. William I, Count of Nassau-Siegen
9. Elisabeth of Hesse-Marburg
2. William the Silent
10. Bodo III, Count of Stolberg-Wernigerode
5. Juliana of Stolberg-Wernigerode
11. Anna of Eppstein-Königstein
1. Emilia Antwerpiana of Nassau
12. Louis, Prince of La Roche-sur-Yon
6. Louis, Duke of Montpensier
13. Louise de Bourbon, Duchess of Montpensier
3. Charlotte of Bourbon
14. Jean de Longwy
7. Jacqueline de Longwy
15. Jeanne of Angoulême
