= John II, Count Palatine of Zweibrücken =

Count Palatine of Zweibrücken

John II
- Count Palatine of Zweibrücken
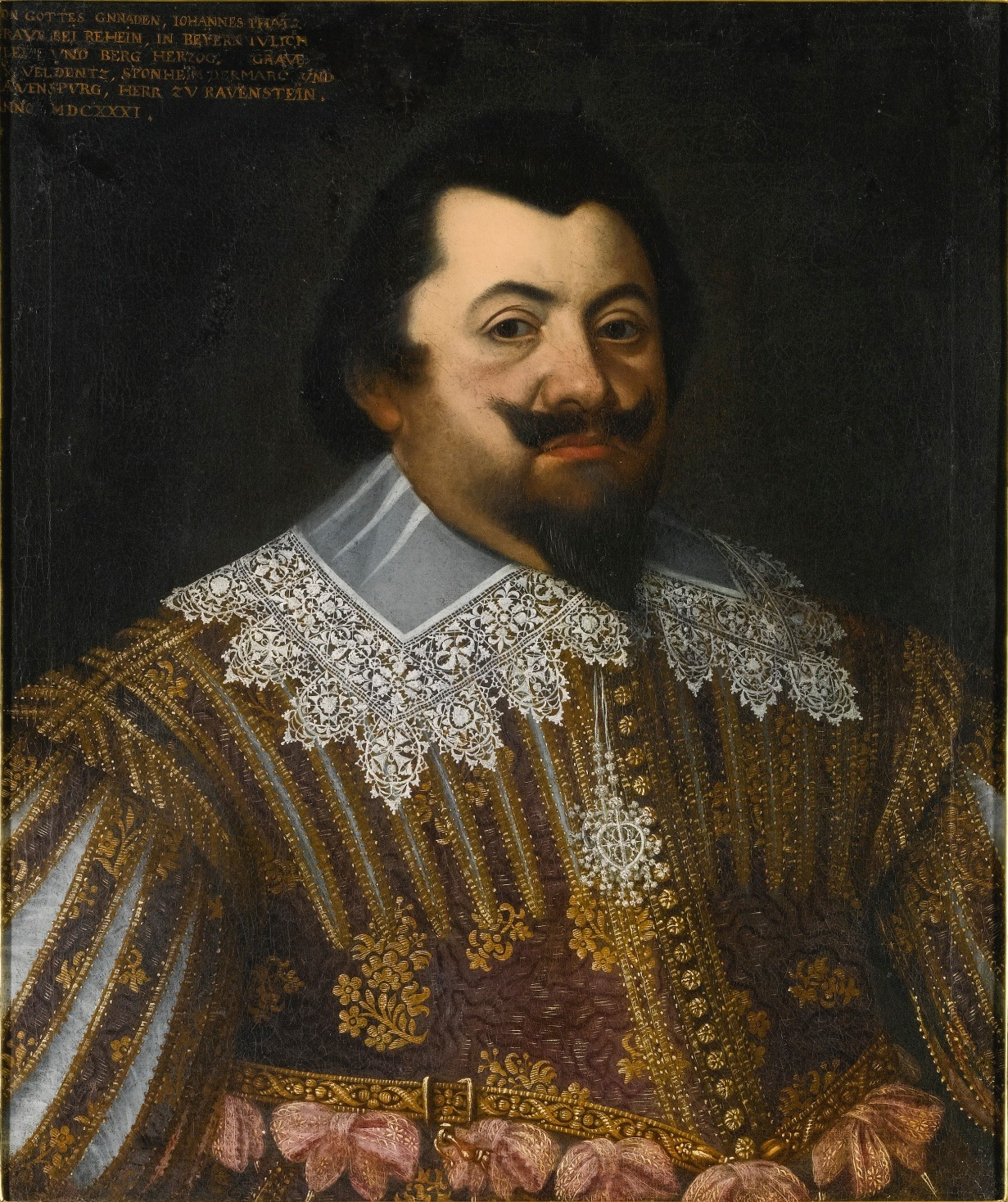
- Portrait, 1631
- Born: 26 March 1584; Bergzabern
- Died: 9 August 1635 (aged 51); Metz
- Burial: Alexanderkirche in Zweibrücken
- Spouse: Catherine of Rohan (m. 1604; died 1607) Louise Juliana of the Palatinate (m. 1612)
- Issue: Magdalena Catherine, Countess Palatine of Zweibrücken; Elisabeth Louise, Abbess of Herford; Catharina Charlotte, Countess Palatine of Neuburg; Frederick, Count Palatine of Zweibrücken; Juliana Magdalena, Countess Palatine of Zweibrücken
- House: Wittelsbach
- Father: John I, Count Palatine of Zweibrücken
- Mother: Magdalene of Jülich-Cleves-Berg

John II the Younger (German: Johann II. der Jüngere) (26 March 1584 – 9 August 1635) was the Duke of Zweibrücken from 1604 until 1635.

== Biography ==
John was born in Bergzabern in 1584 as the eldest son of John I, Count Palatine of Zweibrücken and his wife, Magdalene of Jülich-Cleves-Berg.

He succeeded his father in 1604 and in 1606 he took back possession of the lordship of Bischweiler in Alsace for the House of Wittelsbach from a vassal, Flach von Schwanzenberg.

John died in 1635 in Metz and is buried in the crypt of the Alexanderskirche, in Zweibrücken. He was succeeded by his son Frederick.

== Marriage and issue ==
He married firstly, in 28 August 1604, to Catherine de Rohan, daughter of René II, Viscount of Rohan. Their only child was Magdalene Catherine (1607–1648).

He married secondly, in 4 May 1612, to Luise Juliane, daughter of Frederick IV, Elector Palatine. They had four children:

- Elisabeth Louise Juliane (1613–1667), Abbess of Herford
- Catharina Charlotte (1615–1651), married Wolfgang Wilhelm, Count Palatine of Neuburg
- Frederick (1616–1661)
- Juliana Magdalena (1621–1672), married Frederick Louis, Count Palatine of Zweibrücken

John II, Count Palatine of Zweibrücken House of Wittelsbach Born: 26 March 1584 Died: 9 August 1635
Preceded by John I	Duke of Zweibrücken; 1604–1635	Succeeded by Frederick
