= Magdalene of Jülich-Cleves-Berg =

Noble (1553–1633)

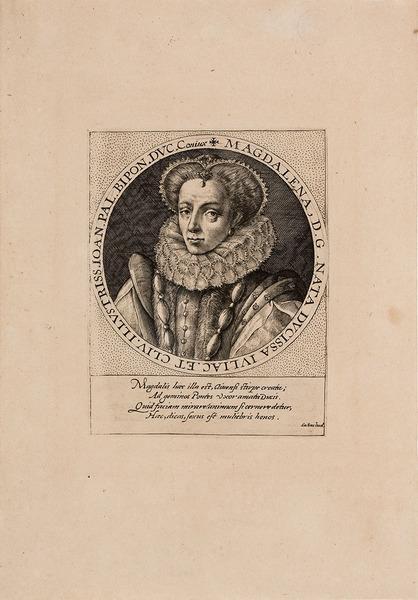
- Portrait of Magdalena von Jüloch-Kleve und Berg
- Born: 2 November 1553; Prague
- Died: 30 August 1633 (aged 79); Hambach
- Burial: Reformed Church of Meisenheim
- Spouse: John I, Count Palatine of Zweibrücken (m. 1579; died 1604)
- Issue: John II of Zweibrücken-Veldenz; Frederick Casimir of Zweibrücken-Landsberg; John Casimir of Kleeburg
- House: La Marck
- Father: William, Duke of Jülich-Cleves-Berg
- Mother: Archduchess Maria of Austria

Duchess Magdalene of Jülich-Cleves-Berg (2 November 1553 – 30 August 1633) was the fifth child of Duke William "the Rich" of Jülich-Cleves-Berg and Maria of Austria, a daughter of Emperor Ferdinand I.

== Life ==
Magdalene’s paternal aunt Amalia played a great part in raising her nieces though William resented the fact that she was a Lutheran and tried to influence his daughters to abandon the Catholic faith. Another aunt of Magdalene’s, Anne, was for a short time the wife of the Protestant king Henry VIII of England.

The influence of Lutheran sentiment at the Düsseldorf court worried the papal ambassadors present and they suggested that Magdalene and her sisters be either sent to their aunt Anna of Austria in Munich or that they be sent to a convent where they would receive proper guidance in the Catholic faith. Their father however refused.

She married in 1579 with Count Palatine John I the Lame of Zweibrücken. Emperor Charles V had in 1546 granted the Duchy of Jülich-Cleves-Berg the right of female succession. So, when her brother, Duke John William, died in 1609 without a male heir of his own, both she and William's daughters could play a vital role in the question of who would inherit the important northwest German territory. Magdalene's husband John claimed the inheritance for Palatinate-Zweibrücken, as did the Elector of Brandenburg, John Sigismund, who was married to Anna, a daughter of Magdalena's sister Marie Eleonore (John Sigismund claimed his marriage contract from 1573 gave him the best claim). The third claimant was Count Palatine Philip Louis of Neuburg, the husband of Magdalen's other sister Anna. Finally, the Duchy of Saxony claimed Jülich-Cleves-Berg, based on an agreement to that effect with the Emperor.

Since all claimants were members of comprehensive European coalitions and so the Habsburgs and France were indirectly involved, an international conflict threatened: the War of the Jülich succession. However, after King Henry IV of France died, the conflict could be settled provisionally by the Treaty of Xanten. The duchy was divided between Brandenburg and Palatinate-Neuburg. In the meantime, Magdalena's husband had died in 1604 and his claim had been inherited by her eldest son John II (1584–1635), who did not receive a share under the Treaty of Xanten.

Magdalene's daughter Elisabeth (1581–1637) married Georg Gustav, Count Palatine of Pfalz-Veldenz. She also had two younger sons: Frederick Casimir (1585–1645) and John Casimir (1589–1652). She died in Hambach Castle on 30 August 1633 and was buried in the Reformed Church of Meisenheim.

== Ancestors ==
Ancestors of Magdalene of Jülich-Cleves-Berg

8. John II, Duke of Cleves
4. John III, Duke of Cleves
9. Matilda of Hesse
2. William, Duke of Jülich-Cleves-Berg
10. William IV, Duke of Jülich-Berg
5. Maria, Duchess of Jülich-Berg
11. Sibylle of Brandenburg
1. Magdalene of Jülich-Cleves-Berg
12. Philip I, King of Castile
6. Ferdinand I, Holy Roman Emperor
13. Joanna, Queen of Castile
3. Archduchess Maria of Austria
14. Vladislaus II of Hungary
7. Anne of Bohemia and Hungary
15. Anne of Foix-Candale
