= Charlotte of Bourbon =

Princess of Orange from 1575 to 1582

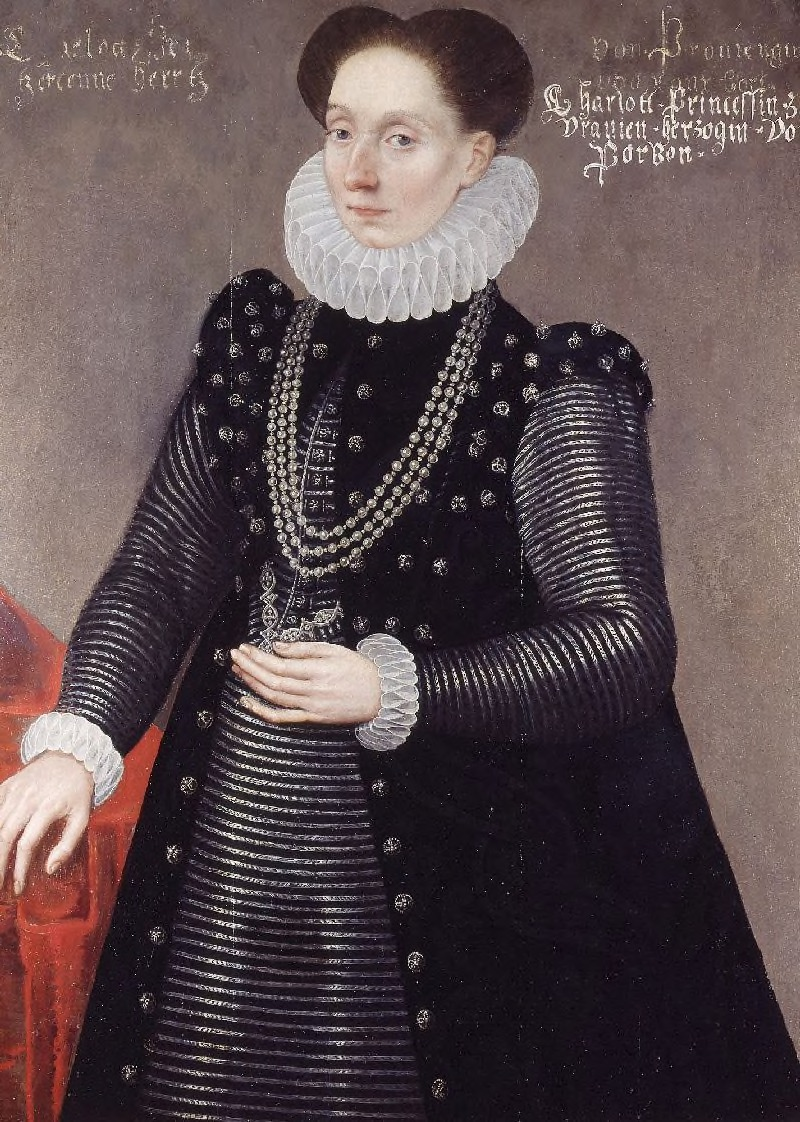
- Portrait of Charlotte of Bourbon by Daniel van den Queborn

Princess consort of Orange
- Tenure: 24 June 1575 – 5 May 1582
- Born: 1546/1547
- Died: 5 May 1582 (aged 35–36); Antwerp
- Spouse: William I, Prince of Orange (m. 1575)
- Issue: Louise Juliana, Electress Palatine; Elisabeth, Duchess of Bouillon; Catharina Belgica, Countess of Hanau-Münzenberg; Countess Charlotte Flandrina; Charlotte Brabantina, Duchess of Thouars; Emilia Antwerpiana, Countess Palatine of Zweibrücken-Landsberg
- House: Bourbon-Montpensier
- Father: Louis, Duke of Montpensier
- Mother: Jacqueline de Longwy

Charlotte of Bourbon (1546/1547 – 5 May 1582) was a princess consort of Orange as the third wife of William the Silent, Prince of Orange, the main leader of the Dutch revolt against the Spanish. She was the fourth daughter of Louis III de Bourbon, Duke of Montpensier, and Jacqueline de Longwy, Countess of Bar-sur-Seine.

== Biography ==
Her paternal grandparents were Louis de Bourbon, Prince of La Roche-sur-Yon and Louise de Bourbon, Duchess of Montpensier. Her maternal grandparents were John IV de Longwy, Baron of Pagny, and Jeanne of Angoulême, a natural (but legitimated by Royal decree in 1501) half-sister of King Francis I of France.

Her mother, Jacqueline, was a believer in the Reformed doctrines, and she secretly taught them to her children. By some accounts, Charlotte's father determined to thwart his wife's influence by sending three of his daughters to convents. Charlotte was then only thirteen years old and begged to be allowed to stay with her mother, who died during the time Charlotte was in the convent. Her father, influential in the court of Catherine de' Medici, placed her in the royal convent of Jouarre, near Meaux, to be raised as a nun. When she was professed as a nun at the age of thirteen, she made a formal written protest.

Other sources claim that Louis simply wanted to avoid paying dowries in order to conserve his only son's patrimony. Charlotte was first sent to Jouarre, where her aunt was abbess, as an infant. The plan for Charlotte was to renounce her inheritance and succeed her aunt. This plan was carried out upon the aunt's death, against Charlotte's wishes, and despite her being only 12. While abbess, Charlotte was secretly instructed in Calvinism by a dissident priest.

The young Charlotte shocked both her family and the royal court by fleeing the convent in 1572, announcing her conversion to Calvinism and, on the advice of Jeanne d'Albret, fleeing to the Electorate of the Palatinate, well beyond her parents' reach.

On 24 June 1575 Charlotte married the Protestant William, Prince of Orange. They had six daughters, including Louise Juliana of Nassau, from whom descended the House of Hanover and most other (Protestant) royal houses. The marriage was very happy–it is said to have been the only one of William's four marriages which was for love–and the obvious happiness of the couple increased William's popularity.

Charlotte allegedly died from exhaustion while trying to nurse her husband after an assassination attempt in 1582. Though William was outwardly stoical, it was feared that his grief might cause a fatal relapse. Charlotte's death was widely mourned. Following her death, William married on 24 April 1583, his fourth and last wife, Louise de Coligny, by whom he had a son Frederick Henry, Prince of Orange.

William's brother John, who had initially opposed the marriage, paid tribute to Charlotte as a wife "so distinguished by her virtue, her piety, her great intelligence, in sum as perfect as he (William) could desire her".

== Bibliography ==
Media related to Charlotte of Bourbon at Wikimedia Commons

- Blaisdell, Charmarie, 'Religion, Gender, and Class: Nuns and Authority in Early Modern France', in Michael Wolfe (ed.), Changing Identities in Early Modern France (London, 1997), pp. 147–168.
- Dalberg-Acton, John Emerich Edward, et al. The Cambridge Modern History. Vol. III, New York: Macmillan Co, 1902. googlebooks.com Accessed 30 July 2007
- Robin, Diana Maury; Larsen, Anne R; Levin, Carole (2007). Encyclopedia of Women in the Renaissance: Italy, France, and England. ABC-CLIO.
