= Landsberg Castle (Palatinate) =

Ruined hillside castle in Germany

Burg Landsberg
- Moschellandsburg, Landsburg
- Obermoschel
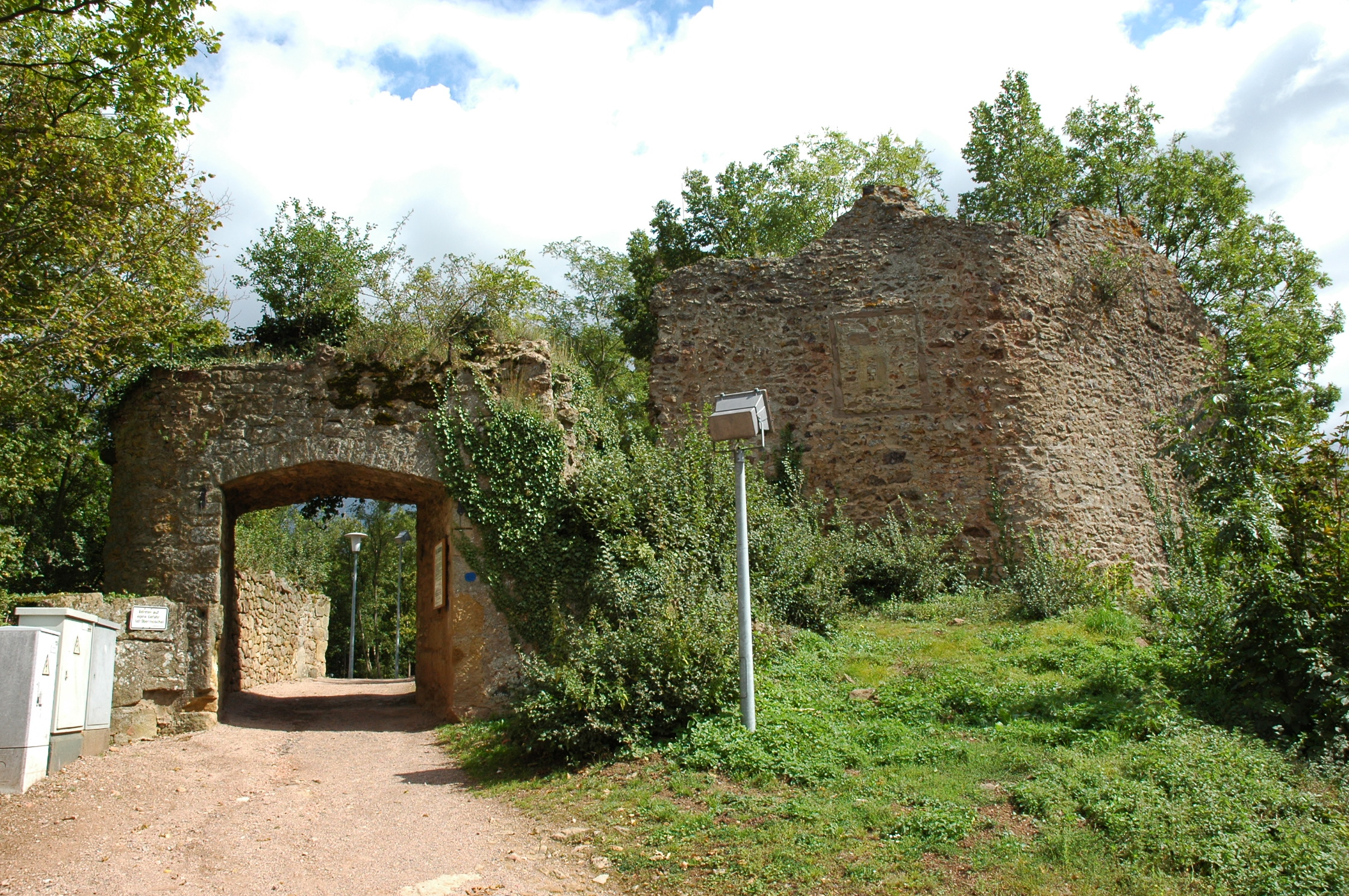

Site information
- Type: hill castle
- Code: DE-RP
- Condition: ruin

Location
- Coordinates: 49°43′30.9″N 7°46′50.87″E

Site history
- Built: 1130
- Materials: rusticated ashlar

Landsberg Castle (German: Burg Landsberg, also Moschellandsburg or Landsburg) is a ruined hillside castle on the hill of Moschellandsberg near the town of Obermoschel in the German state of Rhineland-Palatinate. It may be hired out for private events.

== History ==
The castle is first recorded in 1130 when Count Emicho of Schmidburg bequeathed it to Gerlach I of Veldenz. When Frederick III, Count of Veldenz died in 1444, the male line of the counts of Veldenz died out with him. The castle and the County of Veldenz (as well as a portion of the County of Sponheim) went to his son-in-law, Stephen, Count Palatine of Simmern-Zweibrücken. Stephen divided these holdings that same year, assigning the castle and Veldenz to his younger son, Louis I, Count Palatine of Zweibrücken. Louis expanded the castle into a strong fortress. The castle suffered serious damage during the Thirty Years' War; it was transferred to the Spanish in 1620 and was taken over by Croats in 1622. In 1631, the Swedes entered the castle and used it as a barracks. In 1689 the castle was destroyed during the War of the Palatine Succession by the troops of King Louis XIV. Its ruins were returned to their original owner in 1693. During the French Revolution the castle was seized as 'national property'.

The most comprehensive maintenance and renovation work since the destruction of the castle took place in 1977 and 1978. A few years later, from 1981 to 1983, a refuge hut was built over the cellar vaulting.

The castle belongs today to the town of Obermoschel which, since 2005, has undertaken annual maintenance and improvement work. In 2007, parts of the castle site were planted with old species of rose and the meadow was planted with fruit trees.

== Site ==
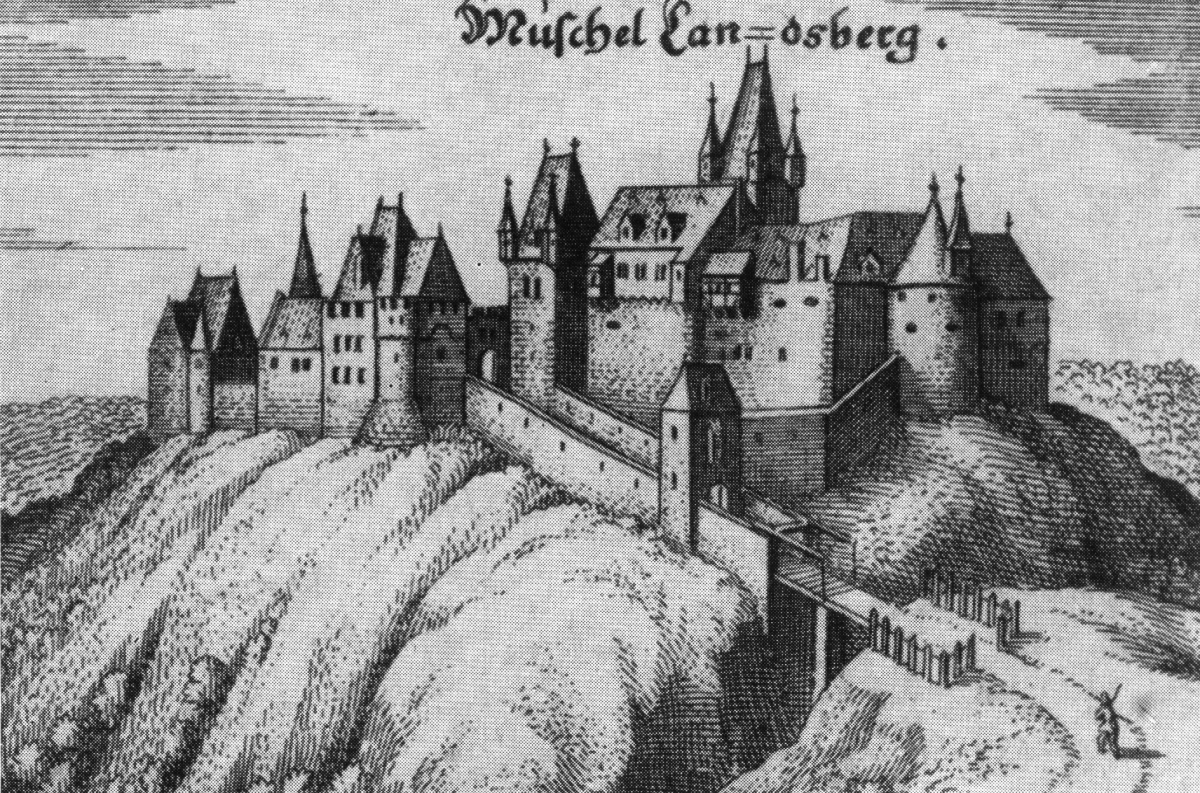
Copperplate of the castle from the 17th century

A bergfried dominates the castle and can be seen from a long way off. In the 16th century, the castle was converted into a Renaissance schloß. A might shield wall of rusticated ashlar from the 12th/13th centuries has survived, as have the remains of the palas, gate tower, enceinte, stables and castle well.

== Literature ==
- Manfred Czerwinski: Burgen. Stolze Zeugen einer großen Zeit. Kaiserslautern, 2002, ISBN 3-936216-07-X.
- Alexander Thon (ed.): Wie Schwalbennester an den Felsen geklebt. Burgen in der Nordpfalz. Regensburg, 2005, ISBN 3-7954-1674-4, pp. 84-89.
