= John I, Count Palatine of Zweibrücken =

Count Palatine and Duke of Zweibrucken (1569–1604)

John I
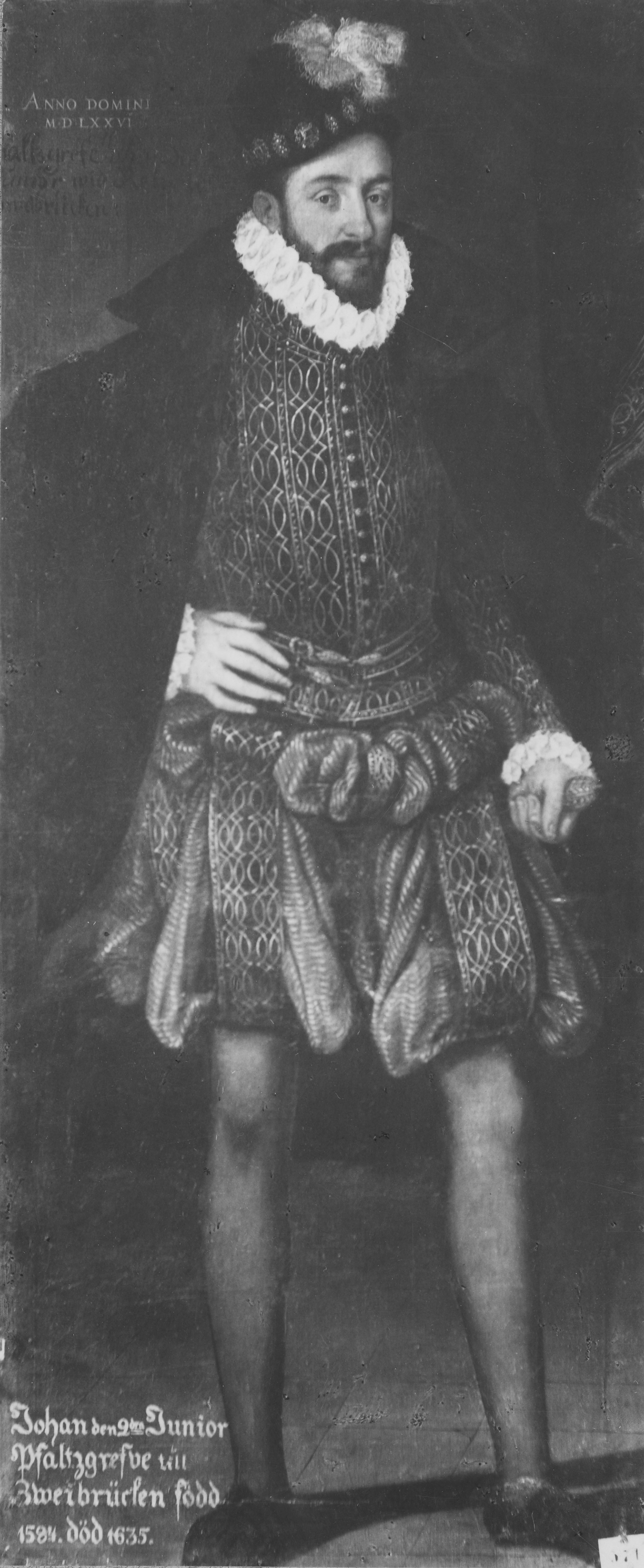
- Portrait, 1574
- Born: 8 May 1550; Meisenheim
- Died: 12 August 1604 (aged 54); Germersheim
- Burial: Alexanderkirche in Zweibrücken
- Spouse: Magdalene of Jülich-Cleves-Berg (m. 1579)
- Issue Detail: Maria Elisabeth, Countess Palatine of Veldenz; John II, Count Palatine of Zweibrücken; Frederick Casimir, Count Palatine of Zweibrücken-Landsberg; John Casimir, Count Palatine of Kleeburg; Amalia Jakobäa, Countess of Pestacalda
- House: Wittelsbach
- Father: Wolfgang, Count Palatine of Zweibrücken
- Mother: Anna of Hesse

John I of Zweibrücken (known as the Lame; German: Pfalzgraf Johann I von Zweibrücken; 8 May 1550 – 12 August 1604) was Count Palatine and Duke of Zweibrücken during 1569–1604.

== Early life and ancestry ==
He was born in Meisenheim, into the House of Wittelsbach, as the second son of Wolfgang, Count Palatine of Zweibrücken and his wife, Anna of Hesse. In 1588 he changed the state religion from Lutheranism to Calvinism.

== Family and children ==
He married in 1579 Duchess Magdalene of Jülich-Cleves-Berg, daughter of William "the Rich", Duke of Jülich-Cleves-Berg.

They had the following children:

1. Ludwig Wilhelm (28 November 1580 – 26 March 1581)
2. Maria Elisabeth (7 November 1581 – 18 August 1637), married in 1601 to George Gustavus, Count Palatine of Veldenz
3. Anna Magdalena, born and died in 1583
4. John II of Zweibrücken-Veldenz (26 March 1584 – 9 August 1635)
5. Frederick Casimir of Zweibrücken-Landsberg (10 June 1585 – 30 September 1645)
6. John Casimir of Kleeburg (20 April 1589 – 18 June 1652), father of Charles X Gustav of Sweden.
7. Amalia Jakobäa Henriette (26 September 1592 – 18 May 1655), married 1638 to Count Jakob Franz Pestacalda di Incardino
8. Elisabeth Dorothea, died young in 1593
9. Anna Katharina, born and died in 1597

== Death ==
He died on 12 August 1604 in Germersheim, aged 54. He is interred in the Alexanderkirche, Zweibrücken, while his wife Magdalene was interred in the Schlosskirche Meisenheim, Rhineland-Palatinate, Germany.

== Ancestry ==
Ancestors of John I, Count Palatine of Zweibrücken

8. Alexander, Count Palatine of Zweibrücken
4. Louis II, Count Palatine of Zweibrücken
9. Margarete of Hohenlohe-Neuenstein
2. Wolfgang, Count Palatine of Zweibrücken
10. William I, Landgrave of Lower Hesse
5. Elisabeth of Hesse
11. Anna of Brunswick
1. John I, Count Palatine of Zweibrücken
12. William II, Landgrave of Hesse
6. Philip I, Landgrave of Hesse
13. Anna of Mecklenburg-Schwerin
3. Anna of Hesse
14. George, Duke of Saxony
7. Christine of Saxony
15. Barbara Jagiellon

John I, Count Palatine of Zweibrücken House of Wittelsbach Born: 8 May 1550 Died: 12 August 1604
Preceded by Wolfgang	Duke of Zweibrücken; 1569–1604	Succeeded by John II in Veldenz
Preceded by Wolfgang	Duke of Zweibrücken; 1569–1604	Succeeded by Frederick Casimir in Landsberg
Preceded by Wolfgang	Duke of Zweibrücken; 1569–1604	Succeeded by John Casimir in Kleeburg
