= House of Carlson =

Swedish noble family, branch of the Wittelsbach dynasty

Carlson
- Swedish High Noble Family
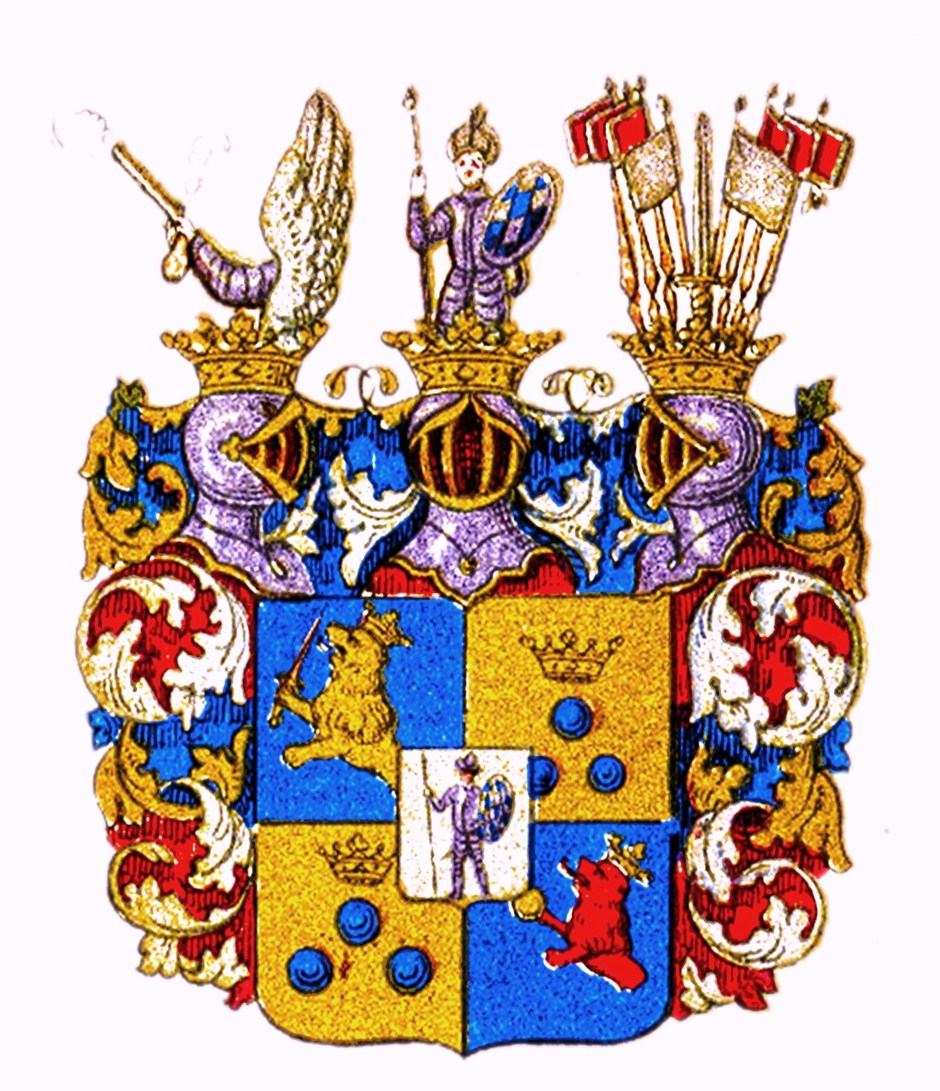
- Parent family: The Wittelsbach (Zweibrücken)
- Country: Kingdom of Sweden; Dutch Republic; Kingdom of England
- Current region: Sweden, Netherlands, England
- Origin: Sweden
- Founded: 1675
- Final ruler: Gustaf Carlson
- Final head: Gustaf Carlson
- Titles: Count of Börringe; Count of Lindholmen; Lord of Börringe; Lord of Lindholmen
- Style: "High Well-born"
- Connected members: The Swedish Royal Family

The House of Carlson was Swedish high nobility associated with the Swedish Royal Family. It held the counties of Börringe and Lindholmen as fiefs.

== History ==
The House of Carlson began with Gustaf Carlson, the illegitimate eldest son of king Charles X Gustav of Sweden and his mistress Märta Allertz. The young Gustaf was given the two estates of Börringe and Lindholmen by his father. Gustaf was in 1675 elevated to Countly status alongside his two estates, by his half-brother king Charles XI. He was styled as "His Highness, Count Gustaf Carlson, Lord of Börringe and Lindholmen". When he later went on to serve as a confidant of the English monarch William III, he was granted the style of Sir. When Gustaf Carlson eventually died in 1708 the House of Carlson died out, with his only heir dying only a couple of days after birth.
