= Eskilsø Monastery =

Early medieval monastery in Denmark

Coordinates: 55.7382°N 12.0777°E

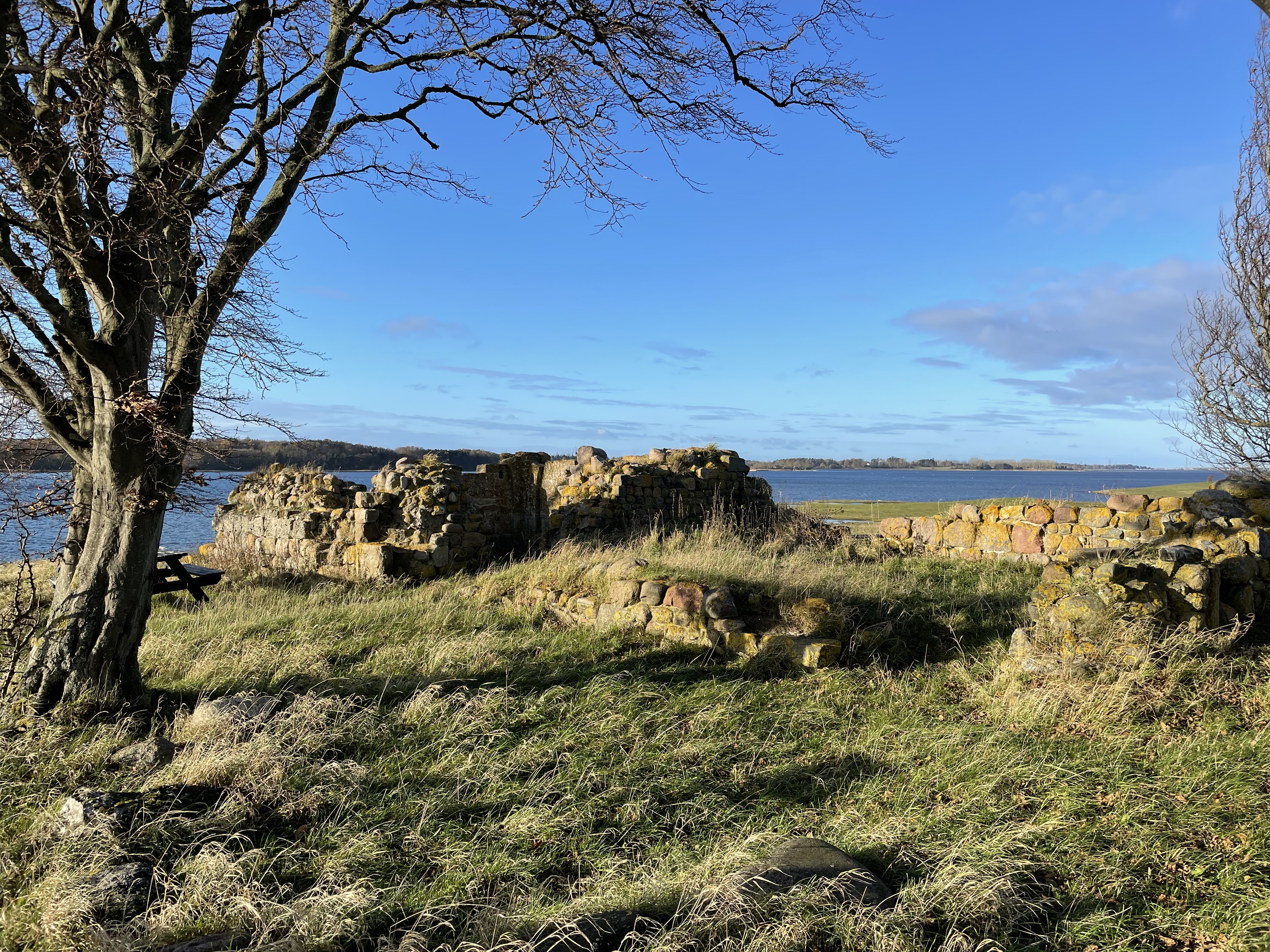
Ruins of the Eskilsø Monastery

Eskilsø Monastery (Danish: Eskilsø Kloster) was an Augustinian monastery on Eskilsø Island in Roskilde Fjord.

== History ==
The monastery was established in the 12th century and dedicated to Saint Thomas. No records exist of exactly when the monastery was built, but it was likely founded by Eskil during his tenure as the Bishop of Roskilde (1134–1137). This timeline is supported by the fact that Asser, who was elected bishop of Roskilde in 1139, was a former cloistered resident of the monastery.

The monks of the monastery were canons regular, and besides religious and theological immersion they were responsible for the upkeep and development of the monastery and its belongings. In addition to the lands of Eskilsø, which were primarily used for grazing, it was endowed with properties in and around Jyllinge, including Jyllinge Church, a water mill, and a few corvée farms. Monks from the monastery generally officiated at mass in Jyllinge Kirke.

As the bishop of Roskilde, Absalon decided in 1165 to reform the monastery. He called on his friend William, a canon regular of Sainte-Geneviève in Paris, where Absalon had studied theology in his youth, and instated him as the abbot of Eskilsø Monastery. The remaining six canons of Eskilsø clashed with William, as he insisted on strict monastic discipline and an ascetic and vegetarian life style, and two of them were dismissed when they refused to submit to the new rule. The new canons following William from France found the climate in Denmark too cold and the surroundings of the small monastery too insignificant, and they all soon returned to France. William also considered surrendering and going home, but eventually he agreed with Absalon that Eskilsø was an unfit location, and in 1175 the monastery moved to Æbelholt in Tjæreby Parish near Hillerød after being endowed with several farms, the tithes from many north Zealand churches, and several mills.

After the move Æbelholt Abbey kept the old monastery buildings on Eskilsø as a farm and orchard, and until shortly before the Reformation a canon from Eskilsø was the priest in Jyllinge Church.

== Ruins ==
The ruins of the small monastery church are still visible on the highest point of northern Eskilsø. The church was about 24 meters long and 7 meters wide with 1-meter-thick walls, constructed in stone and travertine in the Romanesque style. The church consisted of a nave, possibly with a small tower, a choir and an apse.

The church ruins were formally granted historic preservation in 1809 out to a distance of 3 ells from the outer walls. In 1990 an excavation south and east of the church revealed traces from additional monastery buildings, including a stone cellar, a fireplace, and multiple post holes. Since then a larger area around the complex has been exempt from farming and grazing. Between 1998 and 2000 the ruins were restored to ensure their preservation.
