= Gustaf Carlson =

Gustaf Carlson may refer to:

- Gustaf Carlson, Count of Börringe and Lindholm (1646–1708), Swedish nobleman and military officer, son of King Charles X Gustav of Sweden
- Gustaf Carlson (footballer) (1894–1942), Swedish football player
