= Æbelholt Abbey =

Former Augustinian monastery in Tjæreby, Denmark

Coordinates: 55°56′44.16″N 12°12′44.88″E

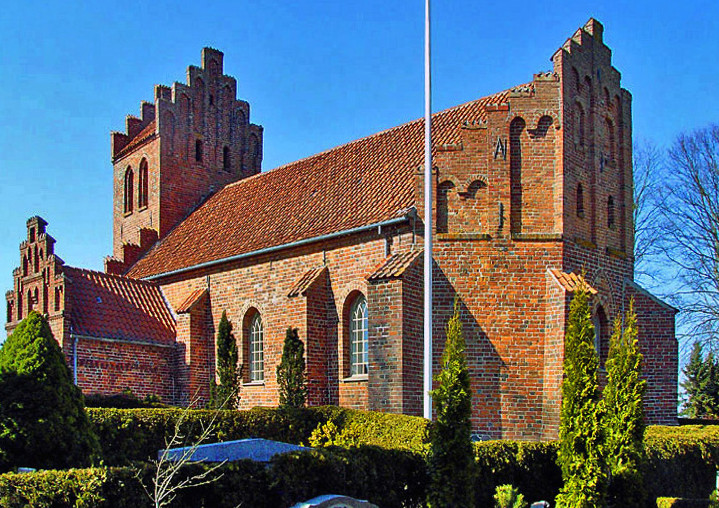
During the middle ages, Alsønderup Kirke belonged to the Æbelholt Abbey

Æbelholt Abbey (Danish: Æbelholt Kloster) was an Augustinian monastery situated at Tjæreby in Hillerød municipality in North Zealand, Denmark.

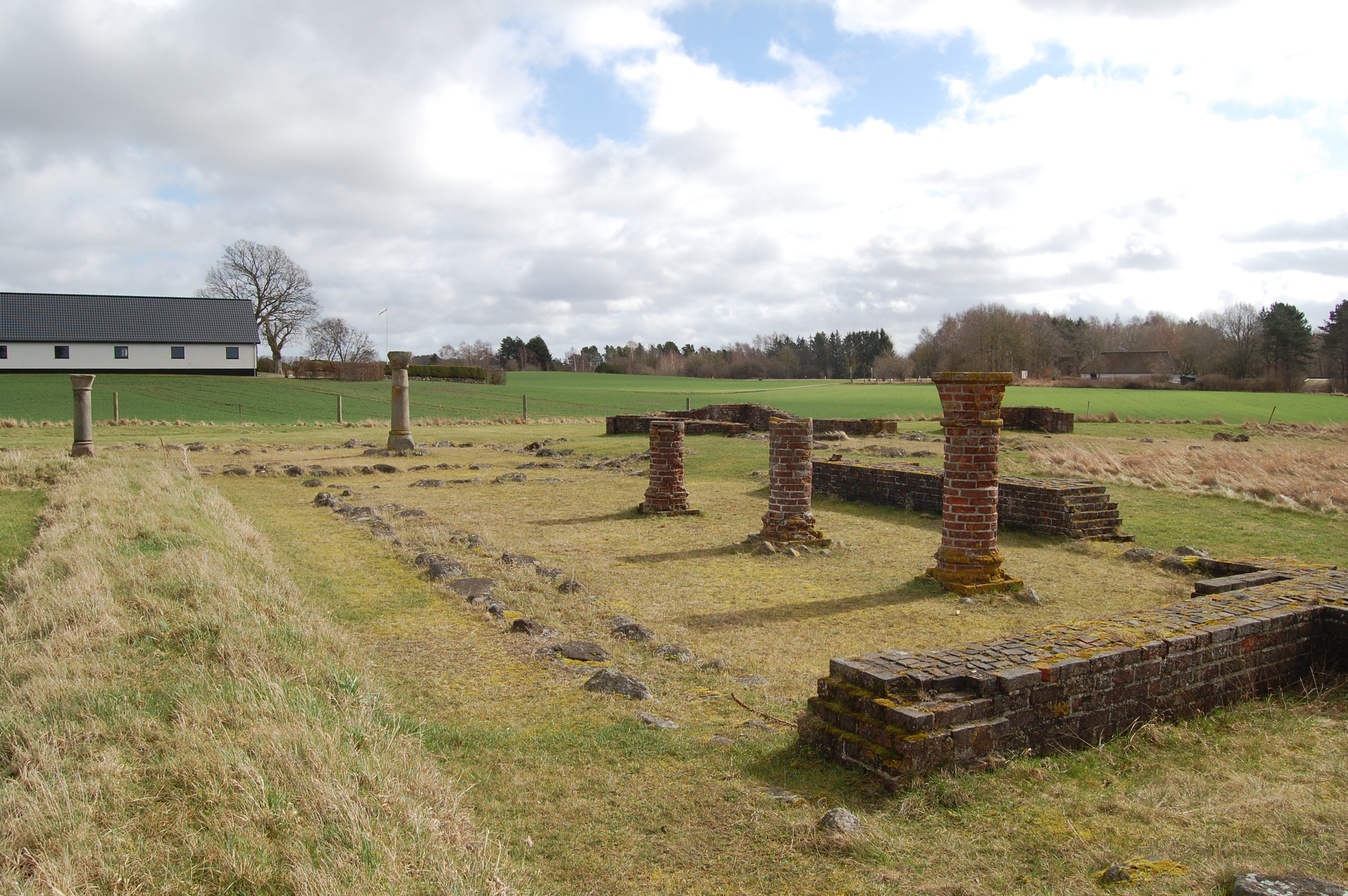
Ruins of Æbelholt Abbey

== History ==
=== William of Æbelholt ===
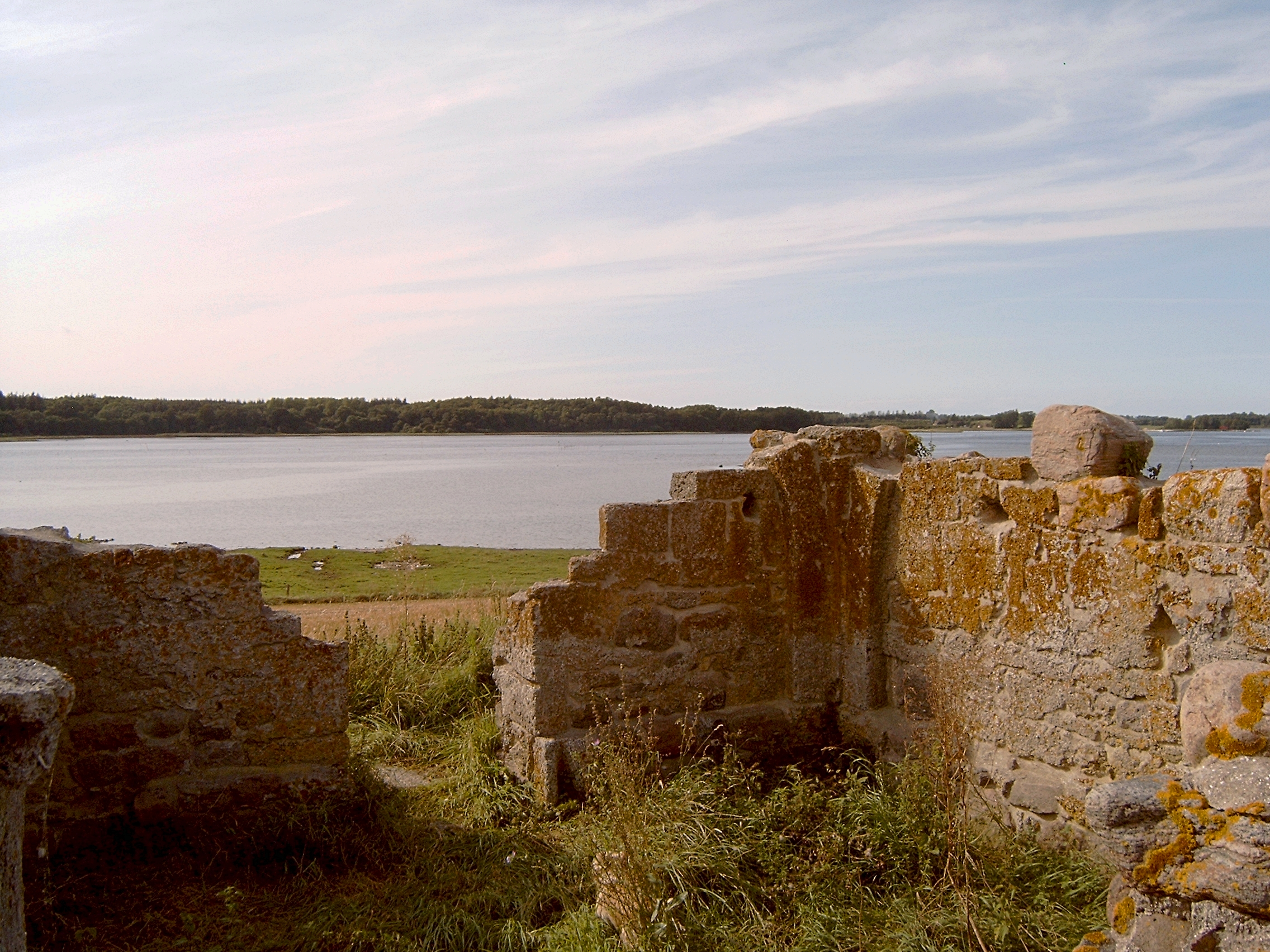
Monastery ruins on Eskilsø

The monastery was first established on Eskilsø Island in Roskilde Fjord in 1104. The stone abbey church still remains in ruins. It was 24 meters long and had a nave, choir, and apse in the Romanesque style. Bishop Absalon of Roskilde, determined to obtain a new Augustinian superior, sent for his friend, Abbot William (Abbed Vilhelm) of Sainte-Geneviève in Paris. When Abbot William arrived in 1165 with three French Canons Regular there were only six religious left at Eskilsø, two of whom were dismissed when they refused to submit to the new rule.

In 1167 the abbey moved to Æbelholt in Tjæreby, supported by a donation of land from Absalon in Tjæreby Parish and endowed with several income-producing farms, tithes from many north Zealand churches, and several mills. The monastery on Eskilsø was closed. The first church and abbey at Æbelholt were made of timber. Construction began almost immediately on a new abbey church of limestone which was completed in 1210.

Abbot William experienced considerable initial difficulties. The three French canons returned to Paris, finding conditions in Denmark too bleak. A few of the Danish canons plotted to murder him when he ordered that they eat "herbs and leaves" instead of their usual meals. Eventually William's piety, fairness, wisdom, and intelligence won them and the local populace over. He was considered a saint in his own lifetime. He was highly regarded by several kings of Denmark and served as an intermediary between the Pope and the Danish monarchy.

Abbot William died on 6 April 1203 at the age of 75. Miracles at his grave and in connection with his relics brought pilgrims in great numbers, and the abbey developed into the greatest Augustinian house in the north. By 1210 the list of miracles and signs recorded was so great that Anders Sunesen, Archbishop of Lund, petitioned Pope Honorius III for his canonization. In 1219 the pope authorized several bishops to investigate the claims with an eye to making William a saint.

Abbot William was canonized in 1224 as St. Vilhelm. On 16 June 1238 with great ceremony William's body was translated to lie inside the high altar in the new abbey church. A small separate chapel was constructed over his previous grave, so pilgrims could visit without disturbing the monks. In time, relics of St. Vilhelm were given to Roskilde Cathedral, Lund Cathedral, the Church of Our Lady (Vor Frue Kirke) and Greyfriars Church in Copenhagen, and Greyfriars Church in Roskilde.

=== Later history ===
By 1230, the monastery housed 25 canons regular, but fed about 100 persons daily. This wide hospitality was funded, as were the abbey's other expenditures, by the revenues of its estates, situated locally and also in Copenhagen and in Halland, and from the dues from the nearby market. Augustinians were interested in farming and improving crops. They hired lay brothers to do the farm work and oversee the temporal affairs of the abbey.

The abbey complex consisted of a quadrangular set of buildings with the church as the north range, round a central cloister and cloister garth. The buildings were constructed of brick, the most common building material at the time. One of the most unusual parts of the abbey was the lavatory which had running water from a ditch, on which it is possible a mill also stood. The church was expanded before 1324 with a longer nave, a crossing, and choir with an apse. Several side chapels were added dedicated to the Virgin Mary, Saint John the Baptist, Saint John the Evangelist and Saint George. The high altar was dedicated to Saint Thomas.

=== Reformation in Denmark ===
After the Reformation in 1535, all religious houses and their income properties reverted to the crown. The abbey church was converted to the large parish church for Tjæreby and Alsønderup Parishes, while the conventual and service buildings were granted as a fief to Kristoffer Throndsen in 1544, with the provision that he should maintain the last remaining canons under Abbot Anders Ibsen. The abbey was formally dissolved in 1560; Abbot Ibsen was sent to the Carmelite priory in Helsingør where he died a year later.

In 1555 the parishioners complained that the abbey church was too big to maintain, and the royal order to demolish the entire abbey complex was given in 1561. The parish churches at Tjæreby and Alsønderup were spared. Much of the stone and brick was reused to construct the nearby Frederiksborg Castle.

== Recent history ==
The site was excavated in the 1930s and 1950s, and the finds are now displayed in the Æbelholt Abbey Museum (Æbelholt Klostermuseum). The outlines of the abbey church and complex have been exposed, as have the pillars from the refectory. Some of the many skeletons discovered during the excavations are on display and provide much information on historical illnesses and medical treatments.

=== Monastery garden ===
A monastic garden was made here in 1957 as a reconstruction of the famous garden at the Abbey of St. Gall in Switzerland. The garden contains over a hundred medicinal plants known to have grown in such gardens in Denmark in the Middle Ages. Hillerød Folk Museum (Hillerød Bymuseum) has published a little volume entitled Æbelholt Klosterhave af Kirsten Baunegaard describing the herbs and medicinal plants in the garden.

=== Æbelholt Abbey Market ===
Almost from the time the abbey was established here a market has been held alongside. Formerly the market lasted for 14 days. The market is now under the auspices of Hillerød Folk Museum which has arranged it annually since 1998; it now lasts for a weekend.

== Other sources ==
- Garner, H.N. (1968) Atlas over danske klostre (in Danish)
- Kirkeleksikon for Norden (Aarhus, Jydsk forlags-forretning) 1900-1929 (in Danish)
