= Eskil of Lund =

Eskil was a 12th-century Archbishop of Lund, in Skåne, Denmark (now in Sweden).

He was one of the most prominent princes of the Church in Scandinavia. Known for his piety, he was always zealous for the welfare of the church, and was a defender of the rights of the hierarchy in its struggle against the civil power and clerical usurpers.

== Biography ==
=== Early life ===
Eskil was born about 1100. His father Christian was descended from an illustrious dynastic family of Jutland and was related to several royal families. When twelve years of age the young Eskil was received into the renowned cathedral school at Hildesheim. Here, during a dangerous illness, he was allegedly honoured by a vision of the Virgin Mary, who, chiding him with his frivolous conduct, saved him from imminent perdition and restored his health, demanding five measures of different varieties of corn as a thank-offering. This vision was interpreted to mean that Eskil would attain high ecclesiastical dignity and establish five confraternities.

In 1131, his uncle, Asser (Asger), the first Archbishop of Lund, nominated him provost of the cathedral. In 1134 he was consecrated Bishop of Roskilde.

As Bishop of Roskilde he called the Benedictines to Næstved, and Eskilsø Monastery at Eskilsø near Roskilde most probably traces its origin to him.

=== Archbishop of Lund ===
After Asser's death in 1137, Eskil succeeded him as archbishop. He successfully defended the metropolitan rights of his see in spite of the protestations of the archbishop of Bremen. He received the pallium (archiepiscopal insignia) from Innocent II through the papal legate, Cardinal Theodignus, who, with many Scandinavian bishops, was present at the provincial Synod of Lund (1139). Eskil completed the new cathedral in Romanesque style, which he consecrated in 1145. On this occasion he increased the membership and the endowments of the cathedral chapter and improved the condition of the cathedral school.

On various occasions Eskil was involved in the internal political disputes of rival kings, even to the extent of being temporarily held captive in his own cathedral, for which he was later indemnified by various land-grants. During the Crusades, Eskil, animated by the example of Bernard of Clairvaux, also preached a crusade against the pagan Wends, which proved unsuccessful. He, nevertheless, continued his campaign with youthful ardour, even in his old age, till, after the conquest of Rügen, the Wends accepted Christianity.

In 1152, Cardinal Nicholas Breakspear was sent as papal legate to Scandinavia to settle ecclesiastical affairs. Norway was constituted a separate ecclesiastical province, with its metropolitan see of Trondhjem (Nidaros). Eskil remained Archbishop of Lund. He was also nominated Primate of Sweden and papal legate for the North.

By a proper selection of persons for the higher ecclesiastical offices he effected an immense improvement in the standard of religious life. In 1161 he drew up a code of canon law for Skåne, which, ten years later, was introduced into Seeland (Denmark).

=== Relationship with monastics ===
Eskil established the Premonstratensian monastery in Tommerup, Skåne; the Knights of St. John also settled in Lund during his time. There was also, in Seeland, an establishment of Carthusian monks, but only for a short time. The Cistercian monks were especial favourites of Eskil, who founded their first monastery in 1144 at Herrevad (Herivadum) near Helsingborg, which was soon followed by one at Esrom in Sjælland (1154). From both of these various branches were established.

Eskil corresponded with Bernard, whom he admired and revered. With a view to being admitted to the Cistercian Order he visited St. Bernard at Clairvaux in 1152. Bernard refused him admission, pointing out that his services as bishop would be more beneficial to the church at large. Hearing of Bernard's death (1153), Eskil made a pilgrimage to the saint's grave and thence to Rome, where all his archiepiscopal privileges were ratified by Pope Adrian IV (Breakspear).

=== Prisoner and fugitive ===
Returning, Eskil was imprisoned at Thionville (at the instigation of the Archbishop of Bremen?). In a dignified letter to the kings and the bishops of Denmark, Eskil expressed his willingness rather to suffer innocently in defence of the Church's prerogatives than to be ransomed.

Having obtained his liberty in 1158, Eskil returned home, where he found King Waldemar sole sovereign. When the latter took the part of the antipope Victor, Eskil, faithful to Alexander III, took refuge in foreign parts. Excepting a pilgrimage to Jerusalem, he lived in France (Clairvaux), in close proximity to the pope. In 1164 he consecrated Stephen of Alvastra, a Cistercian monk, first Archbishop of Uppsala. Year later, Benedictine Fulco was appointed by Eskil as the Bishop of Estonia.

After Waldemar's reconciliation with Alexander III, Eskil returned home (1168). Subsequent to the solemn translation of the relics of the canonized (1169) martyr-duke, Knud Lavard (d. 1131), Waldemar's father, Eskil crowned the king's seven-year-old son at Ringsted, 1170.

=== Retirement, death, and legacy ===
After another sojourn at Clairvaux (1174–1176), the venerable archbishop received permission from the pope to resign and to nominate a successor. In the spring of 1177, in the presence of the king, numerous prelates and a great concourse of people assembled in the cathedral of Lund, Eskil, having read the papal decree, declared to resign on his own initiative, laid the official insignia on the altar, and all consenting, designated his nephew, Bishop Absalon of Roskilde, as his successor. He then retired to Clairvaux, spending his last days as a simple monk. The Cistercians honour him as venerable.

The question whether Eskil was married and had a daughter is a subject of controversy, as the celibacy of the clergy did not generally obtain during this time. The claim that Eskil had a child rests principally on the authority of Saxo Grammaticus's Gesta Danorum. Saxo, however, was largely hostile to Eskil as a prelate who put the interests of the international church before those of the Danish monarchy.
