= Lindholmen Castle =

Building in Svedala Municipality, Skåne County, Sweden

Coordinates: 55°29′49″N 13°17′54″E

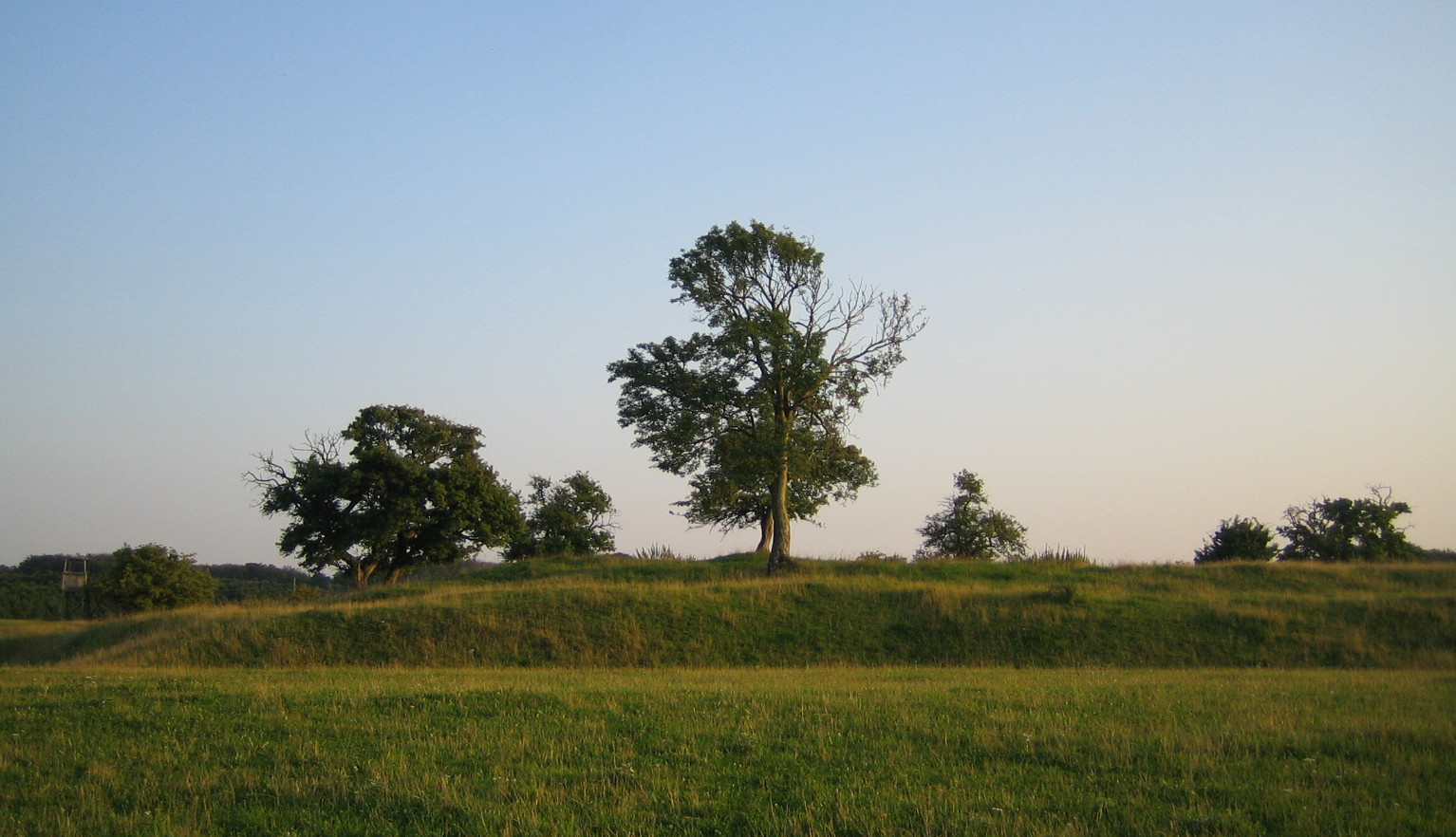
A grassy mound is the only structural remainder of Lindholmen Castle ruin today

Lindholmen Castle was a fortified castle on the banks of lake Börringe in Svedala Municipality in Scania, Sweden. Built when Scania was a part of Denmark, the only thing left of the castle is the hill on which the castle was built and a few stones in the ground on top of the hill.

== Medieval history ==
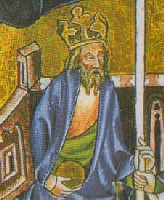
Albert of Sweden

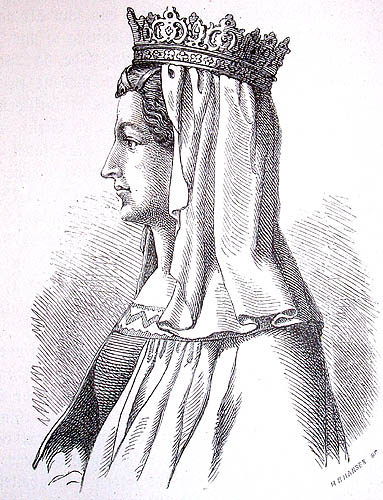
Margaret I of Denmark

Lindholmen became an important fortification in the defence of Scania during the Middle Ages because of its strong encircling defensive walls and double moats. At the time, a small river and treacherous marshes made the terrain surrounding the castle hard to navigate. Originally a private castle, it was in 1339 turned over to Magnus Eriksson (1316– 1374), king of Norway and of Sweden including Scania. In 1368 it was besieged by the Swedes and Hanseatic league, although it withstood the siege.

In 1395, Queen Margaret I of Denmark used the castle as a location to conduct peace negotiations with the deposed king of Sweden, Albrecht von Mecklenburg (c. 1338–1412) who had been forced to give up the Swedish throne in her favor. The meeting at Lindholmen to determine Albrecht’s fate lasted 16 days and was attended by so many participants that tents had to be erected on the castle grounds to accommodate them. Before the negotiations in 1395, the Swedish king had been held prisoner in Lindholmen Castle for close to seven years. He was captured and taken there following his defeat at the Battle of Falköping (1389). During his imprisonment, the Danish queen was the de facto ruler of Sweden.

== Destruction ==
During the 15th century, the castle's importance waned. It was torn down in the 16th century in order to provide building material for Malmöhus Castle. Under the terms of the Treaty of Roskilde in 1658, Scania became under Swedish rule. King Charles X Gustav (1622–1660), gave Lindholmen estate, along with Börringe Abbey, to his illegitimate son Gustaf Carlson (1647–1708). During the Reduction of 1680, Lindholmen was returned to crown property and was leased out. In 1723, Lindholmen and Börringe Abbey were bought by Erasmus Clefwe and in 1827 the joined estates were divided into smaller portions and sold off.

== Other sources ==
- Linton, Michael (1997) Margareta. Nordens drottning 1375–1412 (Stockholm: Atlantis) ISBN 91-7486-471-8
- Sundberg, Ulf (1999) Medeltidens svenska krig( Stockholm: Hjalmarson & Högberg) ISBN 91-89080-26-2
