= Duke of Öland =

Swedish substantive title

Duke of Öland, Duchess of Öland or Duke of Eyland is a Swedish substantive title.

The following rulers have held Öland as duke or duchess:

- Prince Waldemar, Duke of Öland 1310 to 1318 (also of Finland and Uppland)
- Princess Ingeborg, Duchess of Öland 1312 to about 1357 as consort and widow of Prince Waldemar
- Prince Eric (son of above Waldemar and Ingeborg), Duke of Öland 1318 to about 1328
- Crown Prince Eric, Duke of Öland 1557-1560 (also of Småland), then King Eric XIV of Sweden
- Crown Prince Carl Gustav, Duke of Öland (according to Queen Christina) 1650-1654, then King Carl X Gustav of Sweden
