= Abbey of Saint Genevieve =

Monastery in Paris suppressed at the time of the French Revolution

Coordinates: 48°50′45.2″N 2°20′52.2″E

The Abbey of Saint Genevieve (French: Abbaye Sainte-Geneviève) was a monastery in Paris. Reportedly built by Clovis, King of the Franks in 502, it became a centre of religious scholarship in the Middle Ages. It was suppressed at the time of the French Revolution.

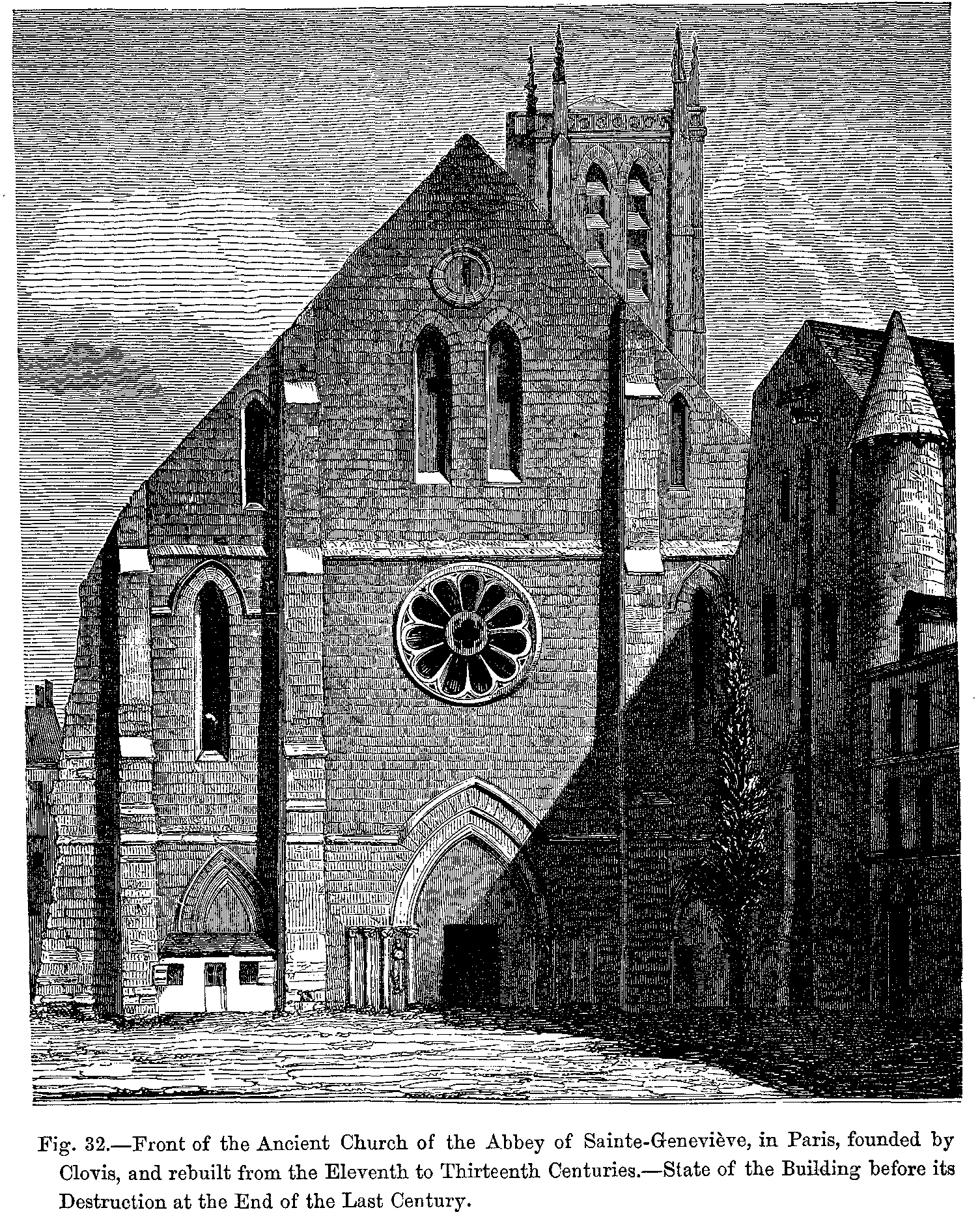
Front of the Church of the Abbey of St Genevieve, in Paris, in a 19th-century engraving of an 18th-century view.

== History ==
The Abbey was said to have been founded in 502 by King Clovis I and his queen, Clotilde, in the name of the Holy Apostles, jointly dedicated to Peter and Paul. It was built on Mount Lucotitius, a height on the Left Bank where the forum of the Roman town of Lutetia had been located. In 508, Clovis, King of the Franks, constructed a church there, where he and his wife were later buried in 511 and 545. Saint Geneviève was in the habit of coming to pray there, taking a route commemorated by the name rue de la Montagne-Sainte-Geneviève. At her death in 512, her remains were interred at the abbey church, near the tomb of Clovis. The church, originally dedicated to Saints Peter and Paul, was rededicated to Saint Genevieve, who became the patron saint of Paris. Her relics were kept in the church, and were brought out for solemn processions when dangers threatened the city. The Abbey of Saint Genevieve became a centre of religious scholarship in the Middle Ages.

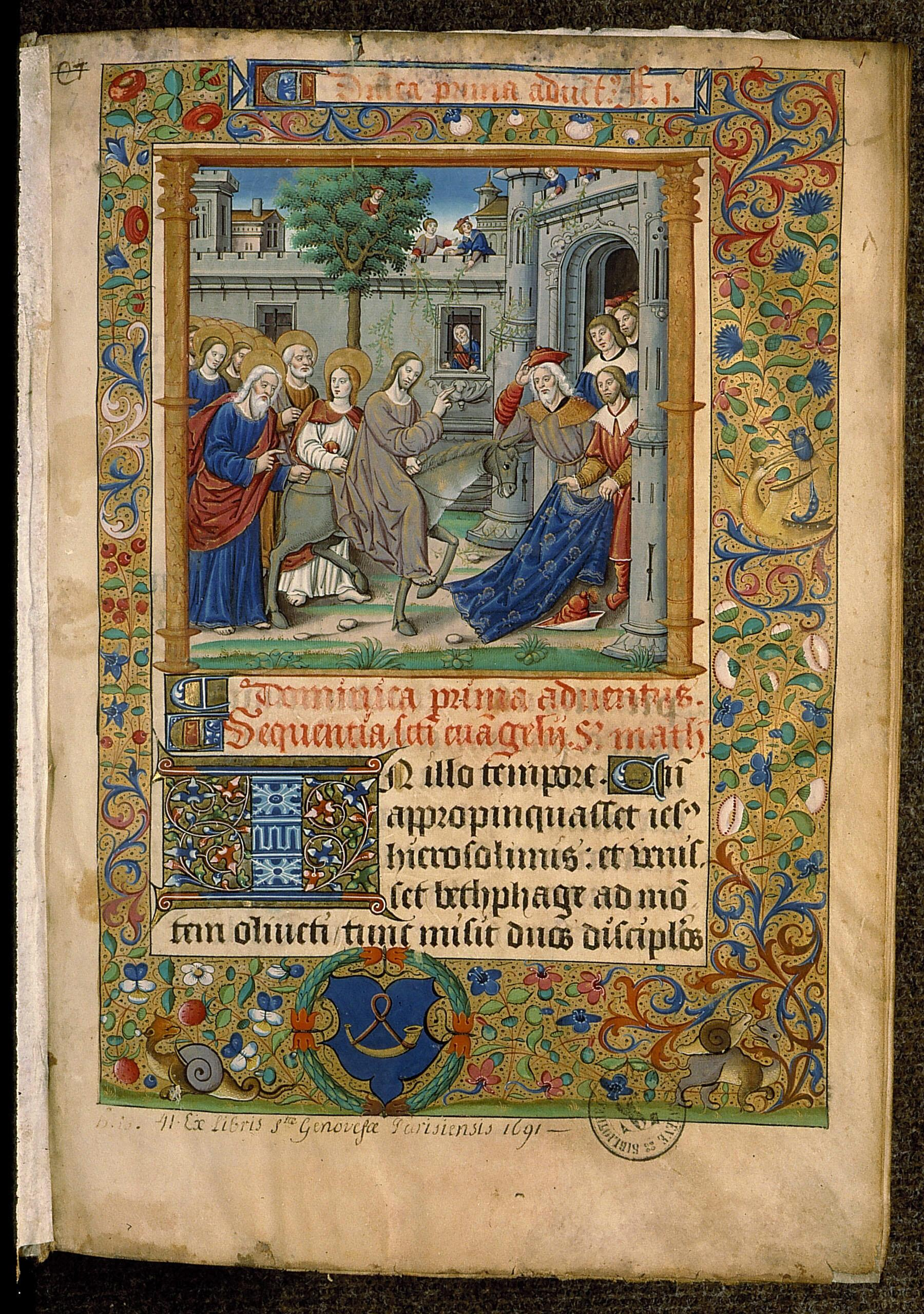
Entrée à Jérusalem, Abbaye Sainte-Geneviève

By the 9th century, the basilica had been transformed into an Abbey church, and a large monastery had grown up around it, including a scriptorium for the creation and copying of texts. The first record of the existence of the Sainte-Genevieve library dates from 831, and mentions the donation of three texts to the Abbey. The texts created or copied included works of history and literature, as well as theology, However, in the course of the 9th century, the Vikings raided Paris three times. While the settlement on the Ile-de-la-Cité was protected by the river, the abbey of Saint-Genevieve was sacked, and the books lost or carried away. Around 1108, The theology school of the Abbey of Saint Genevieve, was joined with the School of Notre Dame Cathedral and the school of the Royal Palace to form the future University of Paris. From 1108 to 1113, Peter Abelard taught at the Abbey school.

In 1147 secular canons officiated in the church. King Louis VII of France and Pope Eugene III, having witnessed some disorders, determined to restore discipline. At the request of Suger and Bernard of Clairvaux, Gildwin, the first Abbot of St-Victor, sent Odo, the prior of his abbey. There were difficulties, but order finally prevailed and some of the canons joined the reform, the Abbey becoming a house of Canons Regular.

Among these was the young William of Paris. At the request of Absalon, Bishop of Roskilde in Denmark, who when a student at Ste-Geneviève's had known him, William was sent to that country to reform the monastery of St. Thomas on the Isle of Eskilsø. William founded another monastery, which he dedicated to the Holy Paraclete. He died in 1206, and was canonized by Pope Honorius III. It was natural that close relations should exist between Ste-Geneviève and its foundations in Denmark. Peter Sunesen, a young man who made his profession at the abbey, became Bishop of Roskilde; Abbot Stephen of Tournai wrote to William and his friends to obtain lead for the roof of his abbey.

Like the Abbey of St-Victor, Ste-Geneviève became a celebrated seat of learning and the site of a great medieval library. St-Victor, Ste-Geneviève, and Notre-Dame were the cradles of the University of Paris. Peter de Ferrière, Abbot of St-Victor, was at one time prior of Épinay, a priory of Ste-Geneviève; William of Auxerre, a professed canon of St-Victor in 1254, held the office of cellarer, and became Abbot of Ste-Geneviève; and Marcel, successively canon at St-Victor and Ste-Geneviève, was in 1198 made Abbot of Cisoing.

In later centuries this abbey fell into the hands of abbots in commendam. In the early seventeenth century Cardinal de La Rochefoucauld undertook the reforms required by the Council of Trent. He brought from Senlis Charles Faure (d. 1644), who had already restored the canonical rule in the ancient Abbey of Silvanect. Once more the Rule of St. Augustine was faithfully observed at Ste-Geneviève's which became the mother-house of the Gallican Congrégation de France, an association of the Augustinian abbeys called the Génovéfains or "Canons Regular of Ste. Genevieve".

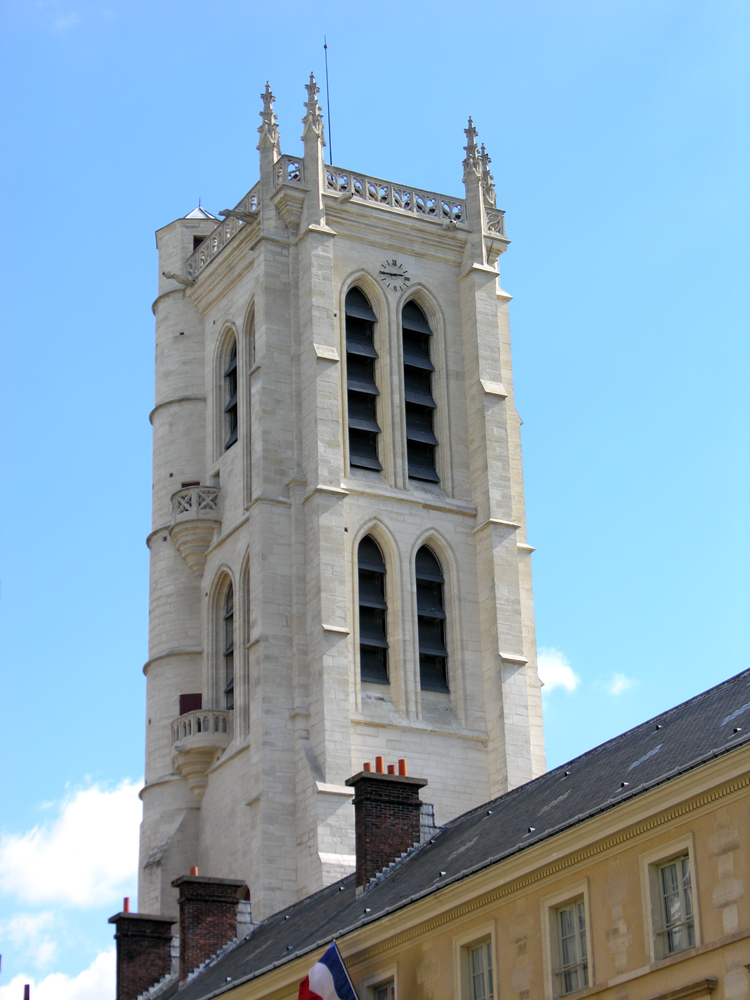
The Tour Clovis

By the middle of the seventeenth century the abbot-general of the congregation had under his jurisdiction more than one hundred abbeys and priories. Men like Fronteau, chancellor of the university and author of many works, Laleman, Chapponel, Reginier, Chengot, Beurier, du Moulinet, founder of the national library, and Augustine Hay, a Scotsman who wrote the Scotia sacra and officiated at Holyrood, Scotland, in 1687, were sons of the French congregation. The astronomer Alexandre Guy Pingré was librarian of Sainte-Geneviève.

In 1744, King Louis XV decided to replace the abbey church, then in poor condition. An immense abbey church over the old crypt was built, to designs by Jacques-Germain Soufflot; in part rebuilt, it serves today as the Panthéon. The Abbey of Saint Genevieve was renamed as the Panthéon due to the French Revolution, and the secularization of religion once the revolution started. The Panthéon was constructed with a united lightness of construction of Gothic churches with the purity and magnificence of Greek architecture. The remodeling of the Abbey of Saint Genevieve was completed right after the French Revolution started in 1790. Architect, Jacques-Germain Soufflot, died in 1780 and his pupil, Jean-Baptiste Rondelet completed the Panthéon in his absence. The abbey church was devastated during the French Revolution. The architectural lanterns and bells were removed from the facade. All of the religious friezes and statues were destroyed in 1791, to be it replaced by statuary and murals on patriotic themes. The relics of Saint Geneviève were burnt; what could be salvaged was placed at Saint-Étienne-du-Mont.

== Institutes ==
In 1636, a religious institute named the "Daughters of Ste. Geneviève", was founded by Francesca de Blosset, with the object of nursing the sick and teaching young girls. A somewhat similar institute, had been founded under the invocation of the Holy Trinity in 1611 by Marie Bonneau de Rubella Beauharnais de Miramion. These two institutes were united in 1665, and the associates called the Canonesses of Ste. Geneviève. The members took no vows, but merely promised obedience to the rules as long as they remained in the institute. Suppressed during the Revolution, the institute was revived in 1806 by Jeanne-Claude Jacoulet under the name of the Sisters of the Holy Family.

== Architecture ==
Reonstruction started in 1755, and it included tall corinthian columns and an imposing dome. The floor plan of this church was a Greek cross plan, with a central space and four arms of equal length. The dome is held up by concealed flying buttresses and light vaulting produced via stone. It could be said that the Abbey of Saint Genivieve was influenced by St. Peter's Basilica, and St. Paul's Cathedral. Architect Jacques-Germain Soufflot did not like the Baroque style and drew more from Neoclassism. Soufflot's director, Minister for the Arts Abel-François Poisson, believed that Neoclassicism embodied the common sense of Enlightenment ethics. In line with their Enlightenment ideals, Poisson and Soufflot used the construction to experiment with iron reinforcements to increase the space for windows.

== Suppression ==
When in 1790 the revolutionary assembly declared all religious vows void, and evicted all of the residents of the monasteries, there were thirty-nine canons at Ste-Geneviève's. This was the end of the abbey and school. To run the new rue Clovis through the site, the building was demolished shortly after 1800, except for the bell tower, called the Tour Clovis, the refectory and the library. The Lycée Henri-IV, built in part with elements of the abbey buildings, occupies the site. The former abbey's library, which had the third-largest collection of books in Europe was transferred to the nearby Sainte-Geneviève Library during the 19th century.

== See also ==
- Panthéon Club

== Bibliography ==
- Allaria, Anthony (1912). "Abbey of Sainte-Geneviève". The Catholic Encyclopedia. Vol. 13. New York: Robert Appleton Company.
- LeBeurre, Alexia (2011). The Patheon - Temple of the Nation. Paris: Éditions du Patrimoie. ISBN 978-2-858-223435.
- Peyré, Yves (2011). La bibliothèque Sainte-Geneviève À travers les siècles (in French). p. 12.
