= Märta Allertz =

Mistress of Swedish royalty

- Born: 1628; Stockholm, Sweden
- Died: 1677 (aged 48–49)
- Other name: Märta Allerts
- Occupations: Landowner; Royal mistress
- Known for: Relationship with Charles X of Sweden
- Children: Gustaf Carlson, Count of Börringe and Lindholm

Märta Allertz (c. 1628 – before 1677) often wrongly referred to as Brita Allerts, was the royal mistress of Charles X Gustav of Sweden. She was the mother of the illegitimate son of Charles X, Gustaf Carlson, who later became a count and a high-ranking military official. The year of her death is unknown: she is last confirmed alive in 1665, and was surely dead by 1677, when her death estate was listed.

== Early life ==
Märta Allerts was born in Stockholm around 1628. She was the daughter of Claes Allerts (d. 1650), who served as a city councilor in Stockholm, and the wheat merchant Britta Jacobsdotter; she had two sisters, Maria and Brita. She became introduced for the future Charles X and his siblings because of their parents' business associations: her wealthy parents helped the parents of Charles X economically, and her mother had a business arrangement with John Casimir, Count Palatine of Kleeburg; she sold the wheat produced in Stegeborg County (Stegeborg Castle), where Johan Kasimir had become county governor in 1622. Allertz and Charles had a relationship after his return from Germany in 1646. In 1647 they had a son, Gustaf Carlson. Charles immediately acknowledged their child. He spent his first three years with his mother, was in 1650 entrusted to Magnus Gabriel De la Gardie and ennobled in 1674.

== Relationship with Charles X ==
Märta began her relationship with the then-Prince Charles Gustav (later King Charles X Gustav) in the mid-1640s, while he was still a Duke and the designated heir to Queen Christina. Unlike many royal affairs of the era, their relationship was relatively stable and lasted for several years (c. 1646–1650). In 1647, she gave birth to their son, Gustaf Carlson. Although illegitimate, the child was acknowledged by Charles Gustav. To provide for Märta and their son, the Prince purchased a large stone house for her on Österlånggatan in Gamla stan, Stockholm. He also granted her a significant annual pension of 200 thaler, ensuring she lived in a style befitting a royal favorite. In contrast to other mistresses of Swedish royalty, Allertz did not marry directly after the relationship was broken. Her mother was granted several sums in the capacity of her guardian. In 1665 Allertz personally was granted eight estates in Färs Hundred by the Queen Dowager Hedvig Eleonora and she was by then no longer under her mother's guardianship, but married and with children.

== Later life and marriage ==
Allertzs relationship with Charles Gustav ended around the time he ascended the throne in 1654 and married Hedwig Eleonora of Holstein-Gottorp. She eventually married Hieronymus von der Burg, a merchant and royal official. Despite her marriage, she continued to receive her pension, and Charles X remained interested in the welfare and education of their son. Märta Allertz is believed to have died before 1677, as records from that time regarding her estate and her son's inheritance suggest she was no longer living.
