= William of Æbelholt =

French Roman Catholic saint

Saint William of Æbelholt
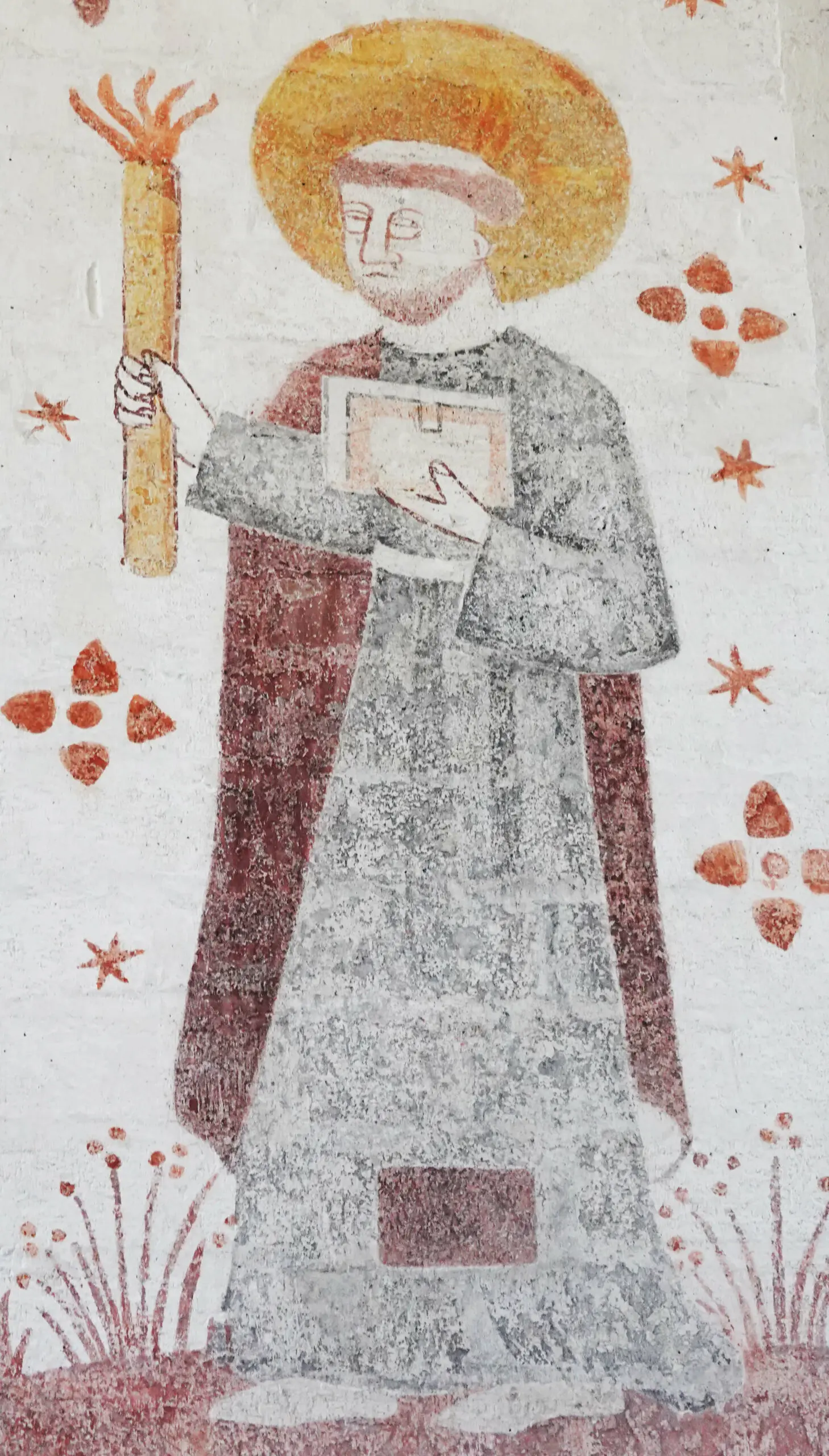
- Saint William of Æbelholt holding a torch and a book. Fresco in Fanefjord Church, Denmark, by the workshop of the Elmelunde Master, late 15th century.
- Born: 1125; Paris, Kingdom of France
- Died: 6 April 1203 (Easter Sunday); Kingdom of Denmark
- Venerated in: Roman Catholic Church
- Canonized: 1224 by Pope Honorius III
- Feast: 6 April, formerly 16 June

William of Æbelholt (also known as Vilhelm of Æbelholt, William of Eskilsø and William of Paris) (d. Easter Sunday, 1203) was a French-born churchman of Denmark.

== Early life ==
William was born of a noble French family and educated by his uncle Hugh, forty-second abbot of Saint-Germain-des-Prés at Paris, and, having been ordained subdeacon, received a prebend in the church of Sainte-Geneviève-du-Mont. William reportedly sought entry into a stricter house (either a Cluniac or a Cistercian monastery) while still in his youth, though he decided to remain at Ste-Geneviève. According to the hagiographic sources, his exemplary life did not commend him to his fellow canons, who tried to rid themselves of his presence, and even prevented by slander his ordination to the diaconate by the Bishop of Paris. William obtained this order from the Bishop of Senlis by his uncle's intercession, and was soon afterwards presented by the canons to the little priory of Épinay.

In 1148, by order of Pope Eugene III, the secular canons of Ste-Geneviève were replaced by canons regular from the Parisian monastery of St. Victor, whose prior, Odo, was made abbot of Ste-Geneviève. William soon afterwards joined the new community and was made sub-prior. In this position he showed great zeal for the religious life, and on one occasion opposed the entry of a new prior who had obtained his position irregularly. For this he was punished by Abbot Garin, successor of Odo, but his action was finally supported by Pope Alexander III. Such actions apparently put William at odds with his abbot, who subjected him to humiliating discipline, about which the canon complained bitterly to the pope.

== Work in Denmark ==
In 1161 Absalon, bishop of Roskilde (and later archbishop of Lund) in Denmark, sent to Paris the provost of his cathedral (almost surely the Danish historian Saxo Grammaticus) to obtain canons regular for the reform of the canonry of St. Thomas at Eskilsø. Absalon and William were said to have formed a close friendship when the former was studying at the schools of Paris. In 1165 William journeyed to Denmark with three companions, and became abbot of that house. When Abbot William arrived there were only six religious left at Eskilsø, two of whom were dismissed when they refused to submit to the new rule. Denmark was an unwelcome destination for these French churchmen. Reiterating themes from the history of early-medieval Christian missions, William and his men were frightened by the culture and language of their new home, and the new abbot's original companions soon left him and returned to France, a permission denied to William.

Nevertheless, despite difficulties arising from poverty and opposition on the part of the community, he reformed the monastery and in 1176 transferred it to Æbelholt, dedicated to the Paraclete, in Sjælland (now Region Hovedstaden), near the present-day town of Hillerød. As abbot, William worked to institute the standards of religious discipline emerging from reform centers in the heartlands of Latin Christendom. These included a stricter insistence on claustration. William also worked to establish closer links among Danish church institutions similarly committed to ecclesiastical rigor. These included other communities in the Augustinian tradition (such as Vestervig), but also extended to Cistercian houses, most notably the monks of nearby Esrum Abbey. In 1183 there were 25 monks and the monastery also functioned as a hostel for visitors. Sometimes more than a 100 persons were fed and the board and lodging was free.

William also continued to serve as an intermediary between Denmark and France. He likely had a hand in arranging for Absalon's relative Peder Sunesen (who replaced Absalon as bishop in Roskilde in 1192) to study at Ste-Geneviève. Peder continued to enjoy a closer relationship with William after his return.

Nowhere was William's role as a conduit between Gallic and Danish society more apparent, however, than in the "Ingeborg Affair." Working apparently on behalf of King Knud VI of Denmark, and Absalon, William intervened in the case of Philip Augustus of France who was attempting to repudiate his wife Ingeborg (1175–1236), daughter of Valdemar I of Denmark. It was on this occasion that he composed a genealogy of the Danish kings, intended to disprove the alleged impediment of consanguinity between Ingeborg and Philip.

== Death and canonization ==
According to the Vita composed to support his candidacy for sainthood, William died on Easter Sunday 1202, though the actual year was 1203. Numerous miracles were reported at his grave, and in 1218 the Archbishop of Lund, Anders Sunesen, requested that Pope Honorius III appoint a local commission to investigate the claims for William's sanctity. Their report was presumably sent to Rome, where it languished for some time. Then, in January 1224, William was canonized by Honorius, who acted on additional information provided by Cardinal Gregorius de Crescentio, recently returned from a papal legation to Denmark. A new church was constructed at Æbelholt Abbey and William's remains were moved there in 1238. In time, relics of St. William were distributed to Roskilde Cathedral, Lund Cathedral, the Church of Our Lady (Vor Frue Kirke) and Greyfriars Church in Copenhagen, and Greyfriars Church in Roskilde.

== Sources for William's life and career ==
William of Æbelholt was the subject of a saint's Vita et miracula, composed most likely as part of his canonization process. It was printed in M.C. Gertz, ed., Vitae Sanctorum Danorum (Copenhagen, 1908–12), pp. 285–369. Gertz also included in that edition a brief treatise supposedly written by William on the authenticity of the relics of Geneviève (pp. 378–82). William's genealogy of the Danish kings can be found in M.C. Gertz, ed., Scriptores Miniores Historiae Danicae Medii Aevi, vol. 1 (Copenhagen, 1970; reprint of Copenhagen, 1917–18), pp. 176–85. William also left a substantial collection of letters, published most recently in the Diplomatarium Danicum, vol. 3, pt. 2, ed. C.A. Christensen, Herluf Nielsen, and Lauritz Weibull (Copenhagen, 1977). Further evidence can be found in charters dealing with Æbelholt (mostly transmitted through the archives of Æbelholt Abbey and its closest neighbor, Esrum). These have been published in the Diplomatarium Danicum.

== Scholarship in English ==
- Ivan Boserup, "A French-Danish Letter Collection and Some Danish Diplomataria: Historical and Literary Remarks on the Epistulae of Abbot William of Æbelholt," in Living Words and Luminous Pictures: Medieval Book Culture in Denmark: Essays, ed. Erik Petersen (Copenhagen, 1999), pp. 78–95.
- Nanna Damsholt, "Abbot William of Æbelholt: A Foreigner in Denmark," in Medieval Spirituality in Scandinavia and Europe, ed. Lars Bisgaard et al. (Odense, 2001), pp. 3–19.
- Anthony Perron, "Fugitives from the Cloister: Law and Order in William of Æbelholt's Denmark," in Law and Learning in the Middle Ages, ed. Helle Vogt and Mia Münster-Swendsen (Copenhagen, 2006), pp. 123–36.
