= Börringe Priory =

Castle in Svedala Municipality, Scania, Sweden

Börringekloster Castle
- Börringeklosters slott
- Svedala Municipality
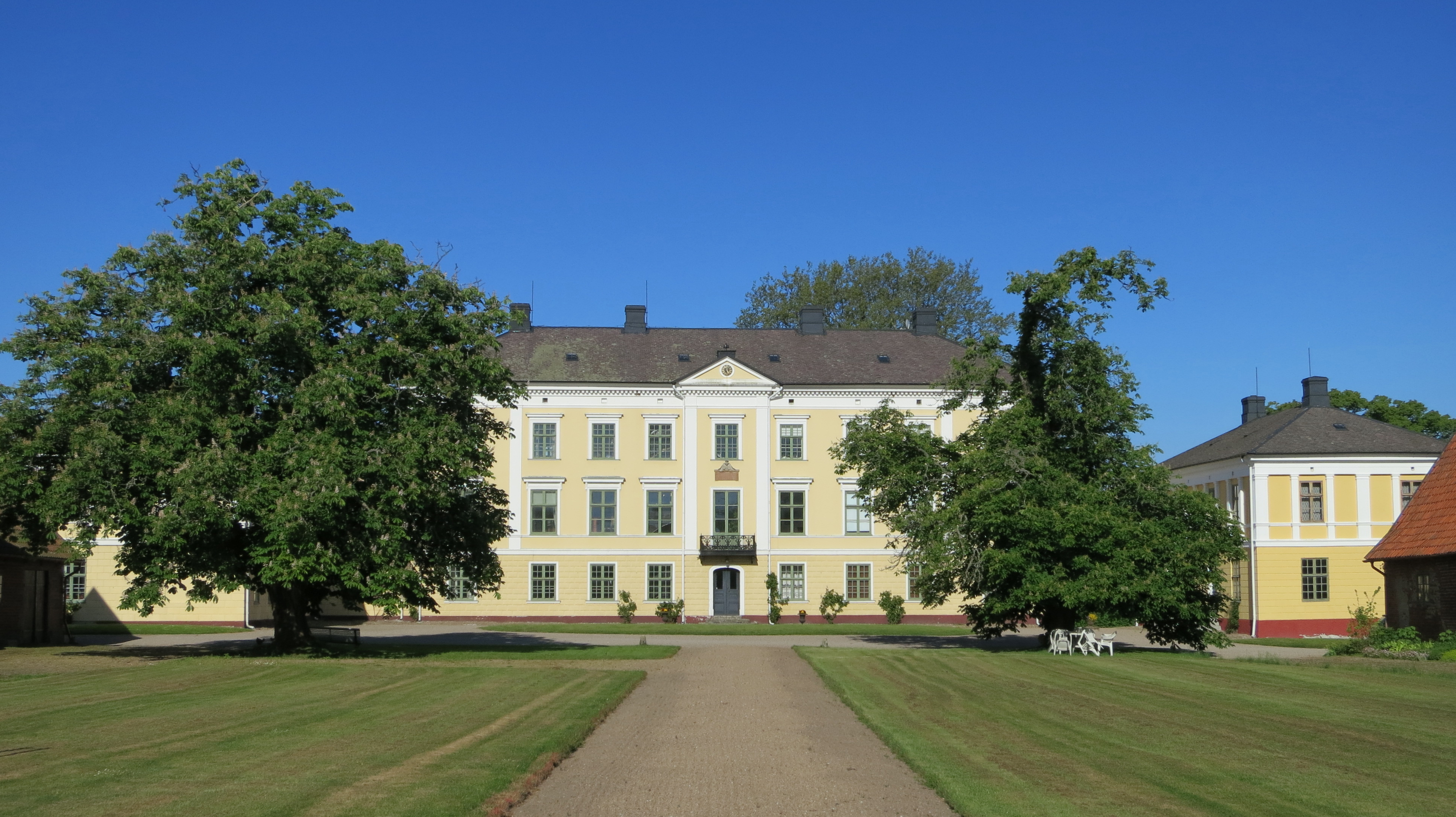
- Börringekloster (Börringe Priory)

Site information
- Type: Castle
- Open to the public: No

Location
- Scania, Sweden
- Location within Skåne
- Coordinates: 55.5069°N 13.3257°E

Site history
- Built: 1200s

Börringe Priory (Swedish: Börringekloster), also known as Börringekloster Castle, is a medieval Benedictine priory in Svedala in Scania, Sweden. Founded in 1150 when Scania was part of Denmark, the priory was secularized in 1536, the site was developed as a home for the Brahe family. The present large building, known as Börringeklosters slott, was built here in 1763.

== Börringe Priory ==
The priory was founded about 1150 under Eskil, Archbishop of Lund, for Benedictine monks. However, by 1231 Börringe Priory is mentioned in Liber Census Daniae as a convent located on the island of Byrdingø in Börringe Lake, on land which Valdemar II of Denmark had once set aside for hunting. The church was dedicated to the Virgin Mary, and the convent was later also known as St. Mary's Priory.

The building complex began small, but with the income from donations of money and rent properties, the priory was able to expand into three ranges attached to the church forming a four-sided enclosure to separate the nuns from the world. The nuns slept in the dormitory, another range contained a refectory and cellars, and a third was used for laywomen who lived in the priory, often the unmarried daughters or sisters of noble families who lived a religious life but were not strictly bound by the vows the nuns took. Occasionally, a widow exchanged her worldly goods for the opportunity to live out her life at the priory which provided room and board until her death. Housing these women was one source of income for the priory. Other income came from rent properties such as farms. While not specifically mentioned another common source of income was part of the tithes from nearby churches given by the Archdiocese of Lund for the maintenance of the nuns. Lastly the priory might also receive royal support in the form of rights to fishing grounds in Börringe Lake or landing rights for commerce over streams or rivers.

The priory was rebuilt over several decades during the 14th century in the Gothic style out of brick. Religious leadership and the internal running of the community was the responsibility of the prioress, while a prior, often a local noble who paid for the privilege, was responsible for representing the nuns in worldly affairs.

The kingdom of Denmark became Lutheran in 1536 under Christian III, a staunch Protestant. All religious houses and their attendant income properties reverted to the crown for disposition. Börringe Priory was secularized the same year and became an estate which the king gave to the Brahe family with the condition that the former nuns were to be cared for, essentially a home for honourable and noble women. The entire archive was lost. The church was converted into a parish church for the village of Börringe.

In 1551, the former priory estate passed to the nobleman Knud Gedde, and was apparently used as living quarters by tenant farmers. In 1582 it passed to Lady Görvel Sparre who ordered the conventual church demolished, and the materials to be used for the construction of a new parish church closer to the town, which was completed by 1587. The grave of Lady Else Brade from the former priory church was moved under the floor of the new parish church. Usable parts of the former conventual buildings were converted into a large house.

== Börringekloster slott ==
At the beginning of the 16th century, Börringe was owned by Søren Norby, who together with the knight Jens Holgersen Ulfstand of Glimmingehus Castle, led the Danish navy to victory in several battles against Lübeck.

When Scania became a Swedish province at the Treaty of Roskilde in 1658, Charles X of Sweden gave Börringe Priory Manor to his illegitimate son, Gustaf Carlson. Charles XI took the property and made it available to the General Governor of Scania, Count Gustaf Otto Stenbock. In 1682, Charles XI exchanged the estate for Herrevad Abbey with Otto Wilhelm von Königsmarck, son of Hans Christoff von Königsmarck, but in 1686, the estate reverted to the crown again.

The Börringe Priory estate was bought by the Beck-Friis family in 1745. In 1763, the remaining house and structures were demolished and replaced by the present building. In 1873 the structure was expanded and renovated into its present appearance. The estate became a joint County (earldom) with Fiholm Castle in Södermanland in 1791 and the Swedish nobility title of Count was awarded to the new owners. There are no remnants of the former priory to be seen, except for a few fragments from the monastic church now in the Börringe burial ground.

== Börringe Church ==
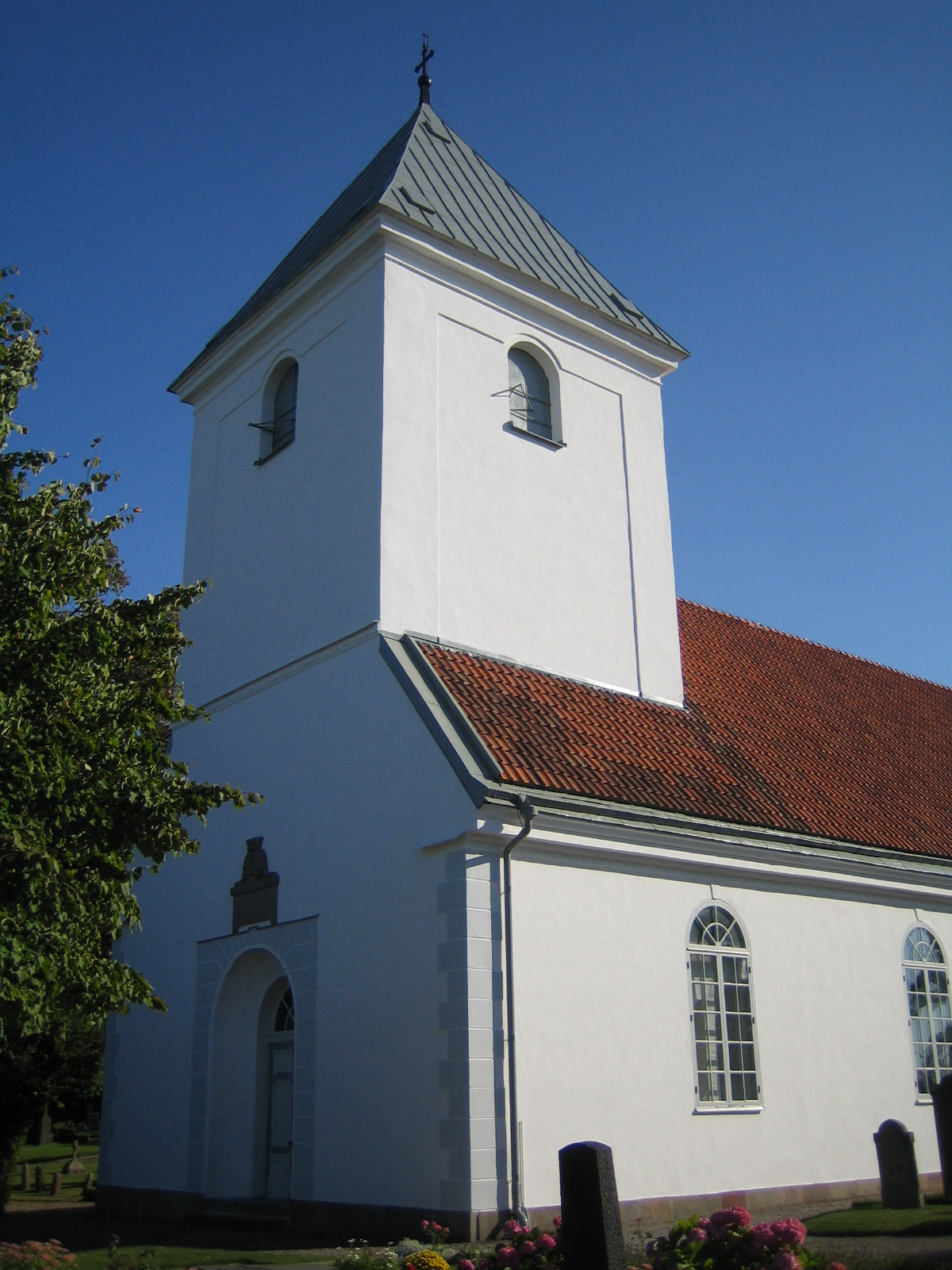
Börringe Church

Börringe Parish was combined with Lemmeströ Parish in 1741. Both of the old churches were demolished and Börringe Church (Börringe kyrka) was constructed for the new joint Gustav Parish in the Diocese of Lund.

== See also ==
- List of castles in Scania
- List of castles in Sweden

== Other sources ==
- Åkesson, Sylve Skånska Slott och Herresäten
