= Charles X Gustav =

King of Sweden from 1654 to 1660

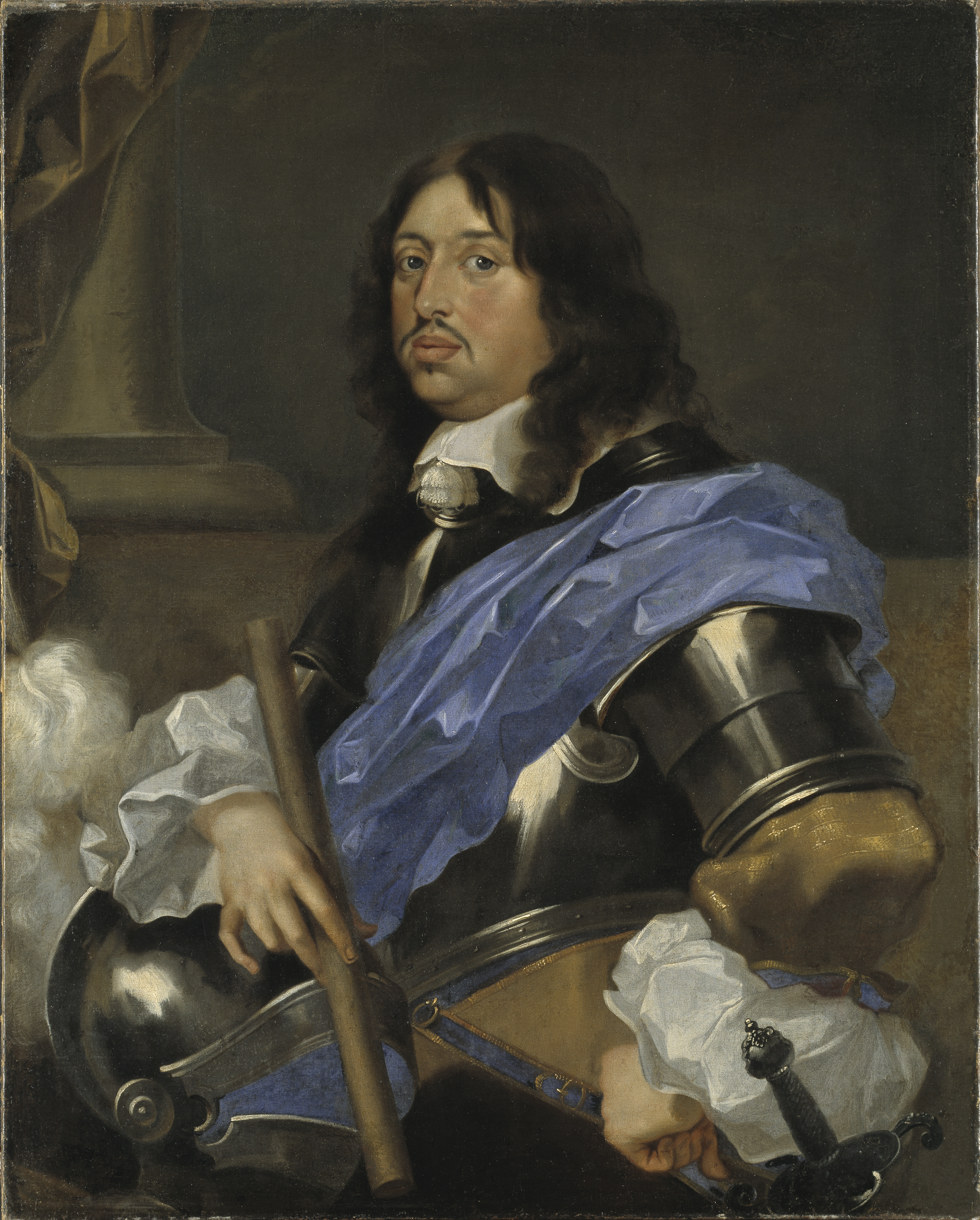
- Portrait by Sébastien Bourdon

King of Sweden Duke of Bremen and Verden
- Reign: 6 June 1654 – 13 February 1660
- Coronation: 6 June 1654
- Predecessor: Christina
- Successor: Charles XI
- Born: 8 November 1622; Nyköping Castle, Sweden
- Died: 13 February 1660 (aged 37); Gothenburg, Sweden
- Burial: 4 November 1660; Riddarholmen Church
- Spouse: Hedwig Eleonora of Holstein-Gottorp (m. 1654)
- Issue: Charles XI; Gustaf Carlson, Count of Börringe and Lindholm (ill.)
Names
- Charles Gustav
- House: Wittelsbach (Note: A member of the House of Palatinate-Zweibrücken (Kleeburg line))
- Father: John Casimir, Count Palatine of Zweibrücken-Kleeburg
- Mother: Catherine of Sweden
- Religion: Lutheran
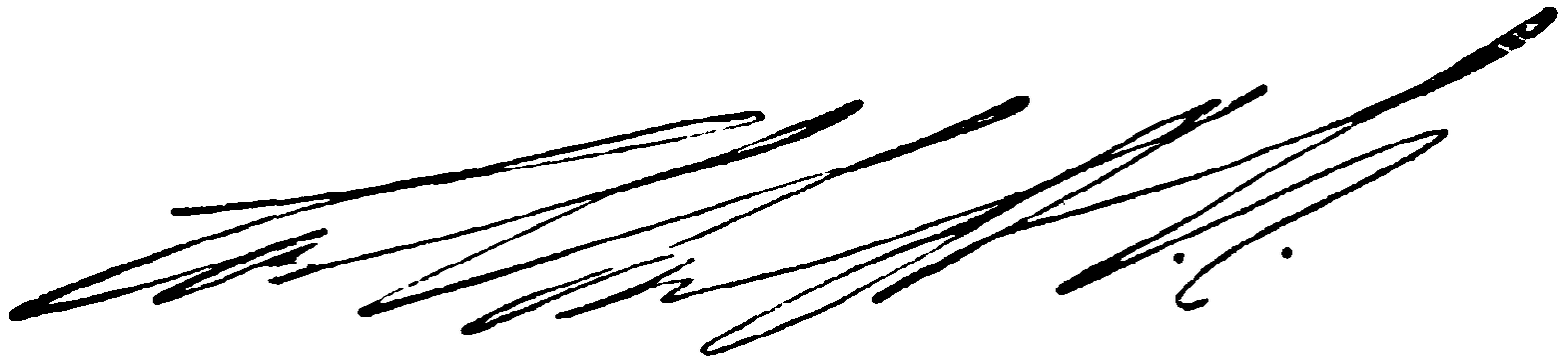
- Signature

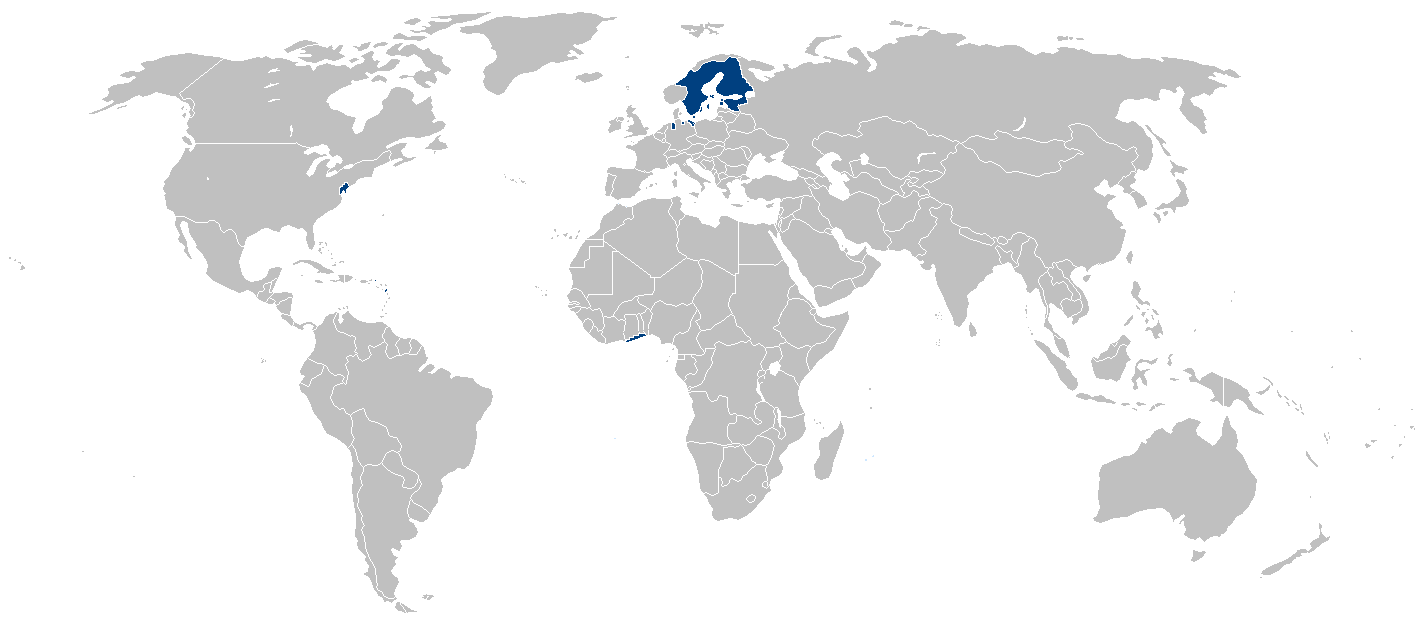
The Swedish Empire at its peak under Charles X Gustav

Charles X Gustav, also Carl X Gustav (Note: His numbering as Charles X derives from a 16th-century invention. One of his predecessors, Charles IX (1604–1611), chose his numeral after studying a fictitious history of Sweden. Charles X Gustav was the fourth actual King Charles, but has never been called Charles IV.) (Swedish: Karl X Gustav; 8 November 1622 – 13 February 1660), was King of Sweden from 1654 until his death in 1660. He was the son of John Casimir, Count Palatine (Pfalzgraf) of Zweibrücken-Kleeburg, and Catherine of Sweden (daughter of King Charles IX of Sweden). After his father's death, he also succeeded him as Pfalzgraf. He was married to Hedwig Eleonora of Holstein-Gottorp, who bore his son and successor, Charles XI. Charles X Gustav was the second Wittelsbach king of Sweden after the childless king Christopher of Bavaria (1441–1448) and he was the first king of the Swedish Caroline era, which had its peak during the end of the reign of his son, Charles XI. He led Sweden during the Second Northern War, enlarging the Swedish Empire. By his predecessor Christina, he was considered de facto Duke of Eyland (Öland), before ascending to the Swedish throne. From 1655 to 1657, he also claimed the title of Grand Duke of Lithuania.

== Heir presumptive ==
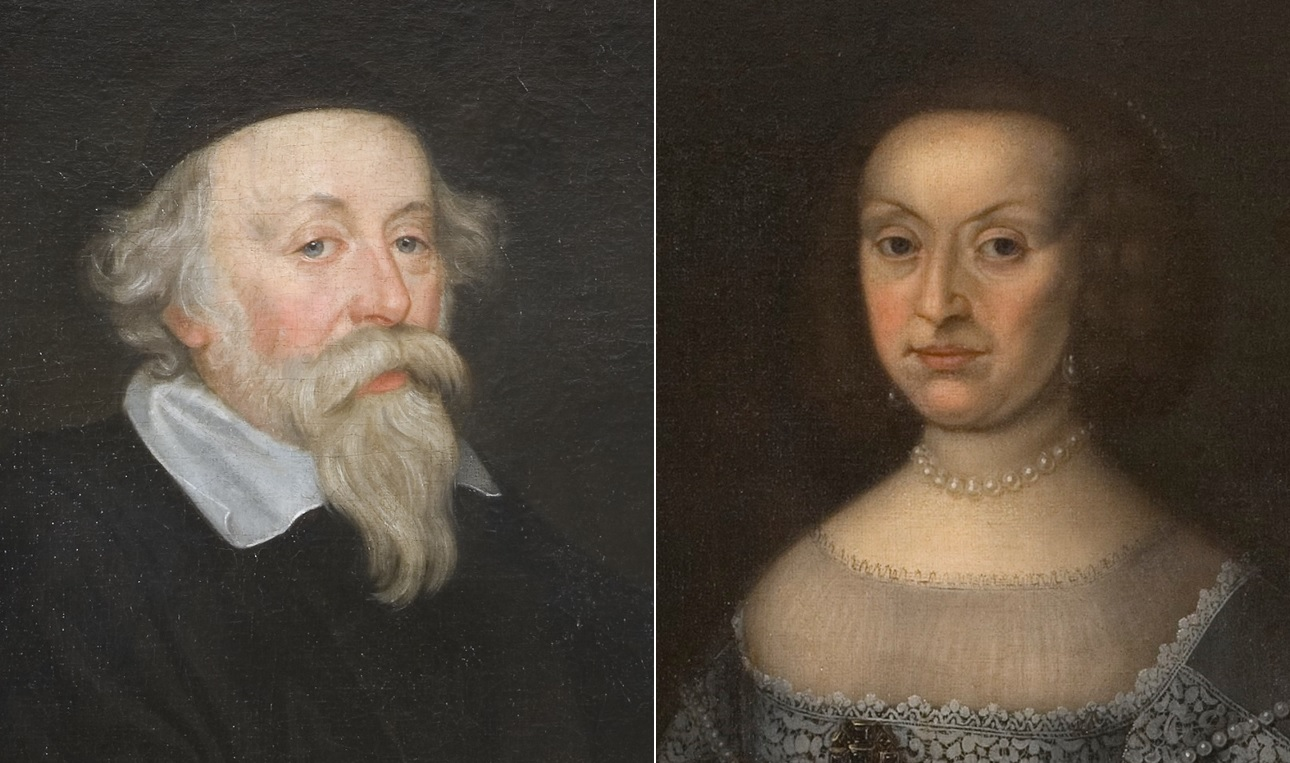
Charles Gustav's parents, Count Palatine John Casimir and Princess Catherine

Charles Gustav's mother and father had fled the Thirty Years' War and never went back to Germany. In his early childhood, raised in the Swedish court alongside his cousin Queen Christina, he received an excellent civil education. Later Charles X learned the art of war under Lennart Torstenson, being present at the second Battle of Breitenfeld (1642) and at Jankowitz (1645). From 1646 to 1648 he frequented the Swedish court, supposedly as a prospective husband of his cousin, the queen regnant, Christina of Sweden (reigned 1632–1654), but her insurmountable objection to wedlock put an end to these anticipations, and to compensate her cousin for a broken half-promise she declared him her successor in 1649, despite the opposition of the Privy Council headed by Axel Oxenstierna. In 1648 he gained the appointment of commander of the Swedish forces in Germany. The conclusion of the treaties of Westphalia in October 1648 prevented him from winning the military laurels he is said to have desired, but as the Swedish plenipotentiary at the executive congress of Nuremberg, he had an opportunity to learn diplomacy, a science he is described as having quickly mastered. As the recognized heir to the throne, his position on his return to Sweden was dangerous because of the growing discontent with the queen. He therefore withdrew to the isle of Öland until the abdication of Christina on 5 June 1654 called him to the throne.

== Early days as king ==
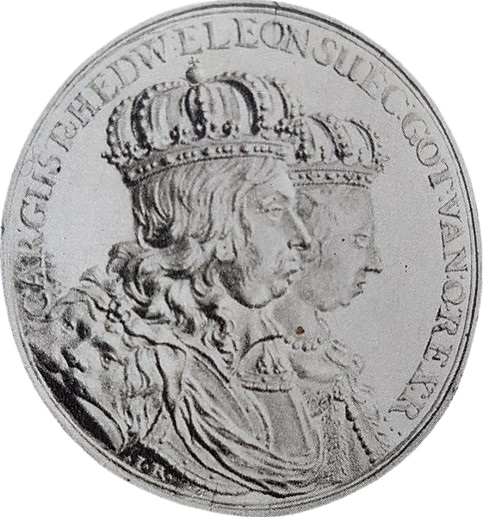
Medal for King Charles X Gustav and Queen Hedwig Eleonora

Charles X Gustav was crowned on 6 June 1654, the same day his cousin Christina abdicated. The beginning of Charles X's reign concentrated on the healing of domestic discords and on the rallying of all the forces of the nation round his standard for a new policy of conquest. On the recommendation of his predecessor, he contracted a political marriage on 24 October 1654 with Hedwig Eleonora, the daughter of Frederick III, Duke of Holstein-Gottorp. He was hoping to secure a future ally against Denmark. The Riksdag that assembled at Stockholm in March 1655 duly considered the two great pressing national questions: war, and the restitution of the alienated crown lands. Over three days a secret committee presided over by the King decided the war question: Charles X easily persuaded the delegates that a war against Poland appeared necessary and might prove very advantageous; but the consideration of the question of the subsidies due to the crown for military purposes was postponed to the following Riksdag. In 1659 he proclaimed severe punishment for anyone hunting in the royal game reserve in Ottenby, Öland, Sweden, where he had built a long dry-stone wall separating the southern tip of the island.

== Second Northern War (1655–1660) ==
=== War in Poland-Lithuania ===
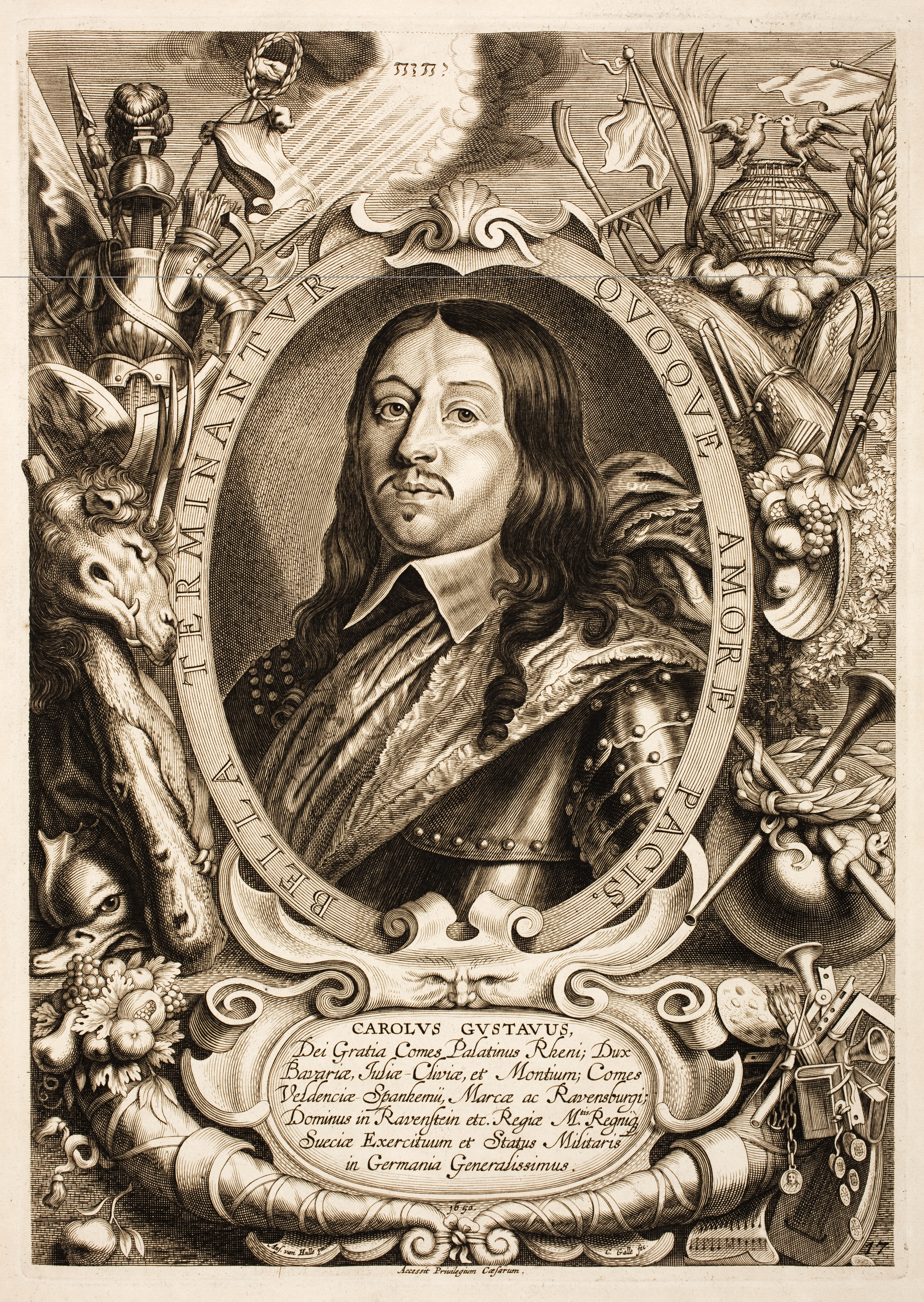
Engraving of Charles X Gustav.

On 10 July 1655, Charles X left Sweden to engage in a war against the Polish–Lithuanian Commonwealth, in what became the Second (or Little) Northern War (1655–1660). By the time war was declared he had at his disposal 50,000 men and 50 warships. Hostilities had already begun with the occupation of Dünaburg in Polish Livonia by the Swedes on 1 July 1655. Then on 21 July 1655 Swedish army under Arvid Wittenberg crossed into Poland and proceeded towards the encampment of the Greater Poland Levy of the Nobility (pospolite ruszenie) encamped among the banks of the Noteć river, with some regular infantry for support. On 25 July the Polish noble levy army capitulated, and the voivodeships of Poznań and Kalisz placed themselves under the protection of the Swedish King. Thereupon the Swedes entered Warsaw without opposition and occupied the whole of Greater Poland. The Polish king, John II Casimir of Poland (1648–68) of the House of Vasa, eventually fled to Silesia after his armies had suffered defeats. A great number of Polish nobles and their personal armies joined the Swedes, including the majority of the famous Winged Hussars. Many Poles saw Charles X Gustav as a strong monarch who could be a more effective leader than John II Casimir.

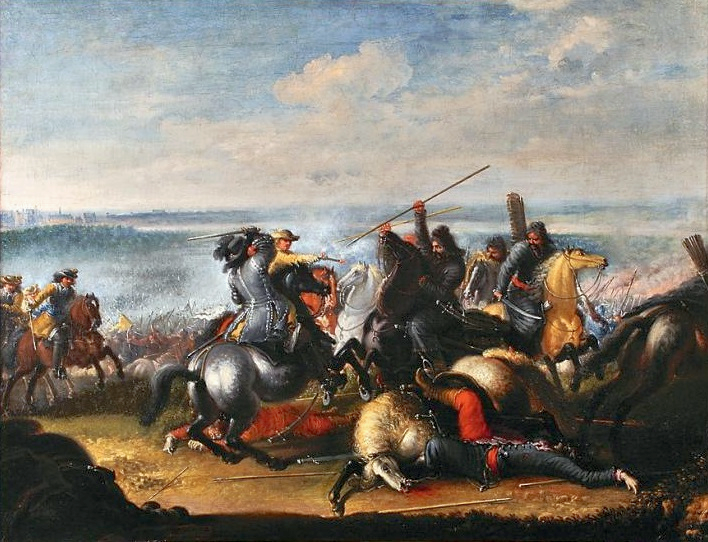
Charles X Gustav in skirmish with Tatars near Warsaw

Meanwhile, Charles X Gustav pressed on towards Kraków, which the Swedes captured after a two-month siege. The fall of Kraków followed a capitulation of the Polish Royal armies, but before the end of the year a reaction began in Poland herself. On 18 November 1655 the Swedes invested the fortress-monastery of Częstochowa, but the Poles defended it and after a seventy days' siege the Swedish besiegers had to retire with great loss. This success elicited popular enthusiasm in Poland and gave rise to a nationalistic and religious rhetoric concerning the war and Charles X. He was depicted as tactless and his mercenaries barbaric. His refusal to legalize his position by summoning the Polish diet and his negotiations for the partition of the very state he affected to befriend awoke a nationalistic spirit in the country.

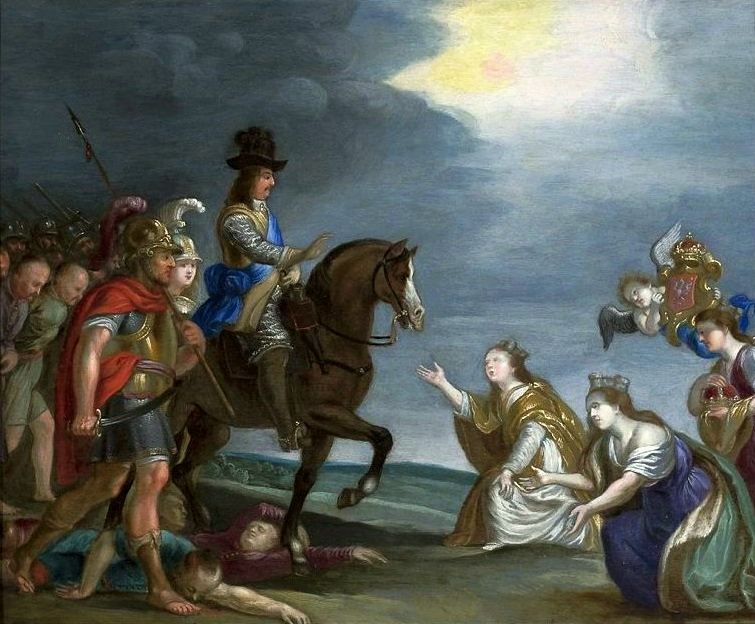
Triumph of Charles X Gustav over the Polish–Lithuanian Commonwealth (c. 1655), National Museum in Warsaw

In the beginning of 1656 King John II Casimir returned from exile, and the reorganised Polish army increased in numbers. By this time Charles had discovered that he could more readily defeat the Poles than conquer Poland. What is described as his chief object, the conquest of Prussia, remained unaccomplished, and a new Swedish adversary arose in the elector of Brandenburg, Frederick William I, alarmed by the ambition of the Swedish king. Charles forced the elector, albeit at the point of the sword, to become his ally and vassal (Treaty of Königsberg, 17 January 1656); but the Polish national rising now imperatively demanded his presence in the south. For weeks he engaged in the pursuit of Polish divisions engaged in guerrilla tactics in the snow-covered plains of Poland, penetrating as far south as Jarosław in Ruthenian Voivodeship (województwo ruskie), by which time he had lost two-thirds of his 15,000 men army with no apparent result. In the meantime, the Russians signed a cease-fire with the Polish–Lithuanian Commonwealth (Truce of Vilna) and then pursued a campaign in Livonia and laid siege to Riga, the second largest city in the Swedish Realm.

Charles's retreat from Jarosław to Warsaw almost ended with disaster. His forces were trapped by the three converging Polish-Lithuanian armies in a marshy forest region intersected in every direction by well-guarded rivers. Escaping this disaster is considered one of his most brilliant achievements. But on 21 June 1656 the Poles retook Warsaw, and four days later Charles was obliged to purchase the assistance of Frederick William I, by the treaty of Marienburg (23 June 1656). On 28–30 July the combined Swedes and Brandenburgers, 18,000 strong, after a three days' battle, defeated John Casimir's army of 40,000 at Warsaw, however the Polish-Lithuanian forces promptly withdrew with no large losses and apparent strong will to fight another day, while Swedish host reoccupied the Polish capital again, causing much destruction to the city and its inhabitants. However, this feat of arms did not have the desired result for Charles, and when Frederick William compelled the Swedish king to open negotiations with the Poles, they refused the terms offered, the war resumed, and Charles concluded an offensive and defensive alliance with the elector of Brandenburg (Treaty of Labiau, 20 November 1656) which stipulated that Frederick William and his heirs should henceforth possess the full sovereignty of East Prussia.

=== War with Denmark–Norway ===
Equestrian portrait of Charles X Gustav

Labiau involved an essential modification of Charles's Baltic policy; but the alliance with the elector of Brandenburg had now become indispensable for him on almost any terms. The difficulties of Charles X in Poland are believed to have caused him to receive the tidings of the Danish-Norwegian declaration of war on 1 June 1657 with extreme satisfaction. He had learnt from Torstensson that Denmark was most vulnerable if attacked from the south, and he attacked Denmark with a velocity which paralysed resistance. At the end of June 1657, at the head of 8,000 seasoned veterans, he broke up from Bromberg (Bydgoszcz) south of Pomerania and reached the borders of Holstein on 18 July. The Danish army dispersed and the Swedes recovered the duchy of Bremen. In the early autumn Charles's troops swarmed over Jutland and firmly established themselves in the duchies. But the fortress of Fredriksodde (Fredericia) held Charles's smaller army at bay from mid-August to mid-October, while the fleet of Denmark–Norway, after two days' battle, compelled the Swedish fleet to abandon its projected attack on the Danish islands. The position of the Swedish king had now become critical. In July Denmark–Norway and Poland-Lithuania concluded an offensive and defensive alliance. Still more ominously for the Swedes, the elector of Brandenburg, perceiving Sweden's difficulties, joined the league against Sweden and compelled Charles to accept the proffered mediation of Oliver Cromwell, Coenraad van Beuningen and Cardinal Mazarin. The negotiations foundered, however, upon the refusal of Sweden to refer the points in dispute to a general peace-congress, and Charles received encouragement from the capture of Fredriksodde, 23–24 October, whereupon he began to make preparations for conveying his troops over to Funen in transport vessels. But soon another and cheaper expedient presented itself. In the middle of December 1657 began the great frost, which would prove so fatal to Denmark–Norway. In a few weeks the cold had grown so intense that the freezing of an arm of the sea with so rapid a current as the Small Belt became a conceivable possibility; and henceforth meteorological observations formed an essential part of the strategy of the Swedes.

==== March across the Belts ====
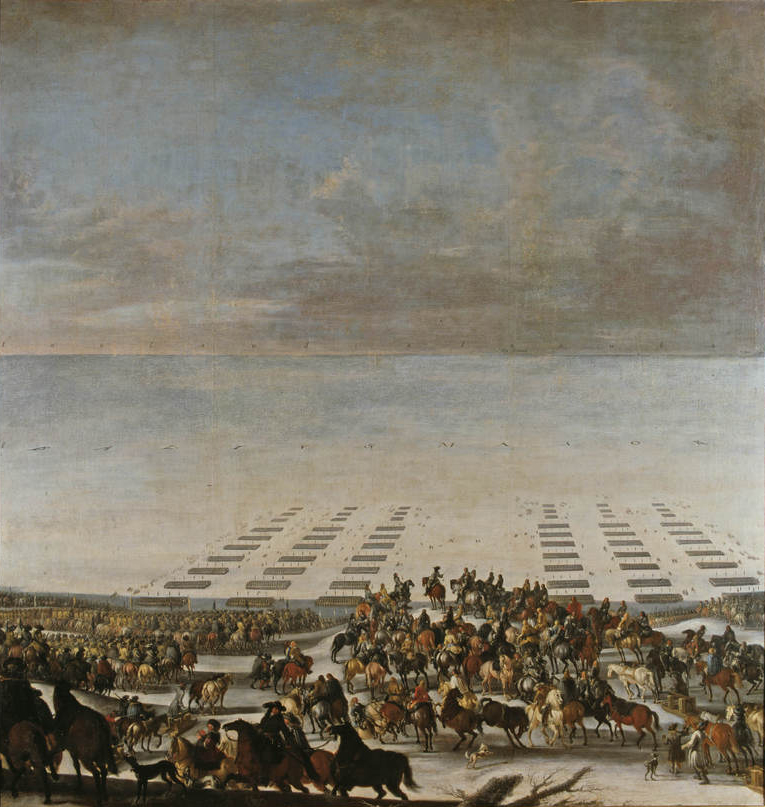
The crossing of the Great Belt.

Equestrian statue by John Börjeson of Charles X Gustav on Stortorget, Malmö

On 28 January 1658, Charles X arrived at Haderslev in South Jutland. His meteorologists estimated that in a couple of days the ice of the Little Belt would become firm enough to bear even the passage of a mail-clad host. The cold during the night of 29 January became most severe; and early in the morning of the 30th the Swedish king gave the order to start, the horsemen dismounting on the weaker spots of ice and cautiously leading their horses as far apart as possible, until they swung into their saddles again, closed their ranks and made a dash for the shore. Swedish arms quickly overpowered the Danish troops lining the opposite coast and won the whole of Funen with the loss of only two companies of cavalry, which disappeared under the ice while fighting with the Danish left wing. Pursuing his march, Charles X, with his eyes fixed on Copenhagen, resolved to cross the frozen Great Belt also. However, he accepted the advice of his chief engineer officer Erik Dahlberg, who acted as pioneer throughout and chose the more circuitous route from Svendborg, by the islands of Langeland, Lolland and Falster, in preference to the direct route from Nyborg to Korsør, which would have had to cross a broad, almost uninterrupted expanse of ice. A council of war, which met at two o'clock in the morning to consider the practicability of Dahlberg's proposal, dismissed it as hazardous. Even the king wavered; but when Dahlberg persisted in his opinion, Charles overruled the objections of the commanders. On the night of 5 February the transit began, the cavalry leading the way through the snow-covered ice, which quickly thawed beneath the horses' hoofs so that the infantry which followed after had to wade through half an ell (nearly 2 feet) of sludge, facing the risk that the ice would break beneath their feet. At three o'clock in the afternoon, with Dahlberg leading the way, the army reached Grimsted in Lolland without losing a man; on 8 February, Charles reached Falster. On 11 February he stood safely on the soil of Zealand. A Swedish medal struck to commemorate the transit of the Baltic Sea bear the inscription: Natura hoc debuit uni. Sweden had achieved a rare war exploit, in Sweden considered to be matched only by the crusade of the Livonian Order led by William of Modena to conquer Saaremaa (Osel) in January 1227 and afterwards when two Russian armies crossed the frozen Gulf of Bothnia from Finland to mainland Sweden in March 1809 during the Finnish War. It is believed that the effect of this achievement on the Danish government found expression in the Treaty of Taastrup on 18 February, and in the Treaty of Roskilde (26 February 1658), whereby Denmark–Norway sacrificed a great part of her territory to save the rest. However, Charles X continued the war efforts against Denmark–Norway after a council held at Gottorp on 7 July, even though he was in defiance of international equity. Without warning, Denmark–Norway was attacked a second time.

On 17 July he again landed on Zealand and besieged Copenhagen with its king Frederick III of Denmark and Norway, but the city managed to hold out long enough for the Dutch fleet under Lieutenant-Admiral Jacob van Wassenaer Obdam to relieve the city, defeating the Swedish fleet in the Battle of the Sound on 29 October 1658, and Copenhagen repelled a major assault afterwards.

== Estates in Gothenburg ==
Charles X consented to reopen negotiations with Denmark, at the same time proposing to exercise pressure upon his rival by a simultaneous winter campaign in Norway. Such an enterprise necessitated fresh subsidies from his already impoverished people, and obliged him in December 1659 to cross over to Sweden to meet the estates, whom he had summoned to Gothenburg. The lower estates protested the imposition of fresh burdens, but were persuaded by Charles.

== Reduction ==
Christina had granted numerous estates to the nobility, a move that Charles X opposed, believing the kingdom's finances should primarily rely on taxes from peasant farms rather than revenues from trade. At the 1655 Riksdag, he initiated a land reduction to restore the state's wealth and strengthen its finances. However, his actions only partially alleviated Sweden's financial situation. The result of these measures was noticeable only after his death, when his son, Charles XI, used the same decrees to justify his own reduction many years later.

== Illness and death ==
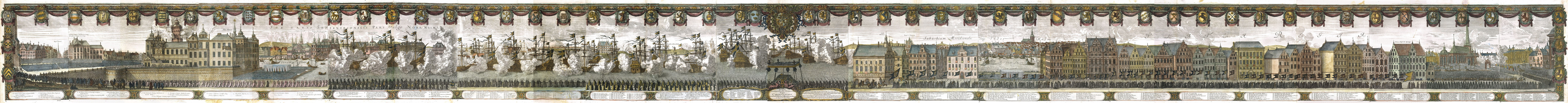
Copperplate engraving depicting the funeral procession of King Charles X Gustav in 1660, engraved by Jean Le Pautre after a drawing by Erik Dahlbergh.

Soon after the estates opened on 4 January 1660, Charles X Gustav fell ill with symptoms of a cold. Ignoring his illness, he repeatedly went to inspect the Swedish forces near Gothenburg, and soon broke down with chills, headaches, and dyspnoea. On 15 January, court physician Johann Köster arrived, and in medical error mistook Charles X Gustav's pneumonia for scurvy and dyspepsia. Köster started a "cure" including the application of multiple enemata, laxatives, bloodletting and sneezing powder. While after three weeks the fever eventually was down and the coughing was better, the pneumonia had persisted and evolved into a sepsis by 8 February.

On 12 February, Charles X Gustav signed his testament: His son, Charles XI of Sweden, was still a minor, and Charles X Gustav appointed a minor regency consisting of six relatives and close friends. Charles X Gustav died the next day at the age of 37.

On the night between 12 and 13 February, he would die in the arms of Lord High Marshal Gabriel Oxenstierna after having urged him to bring peace to Sweden.

== Family ==
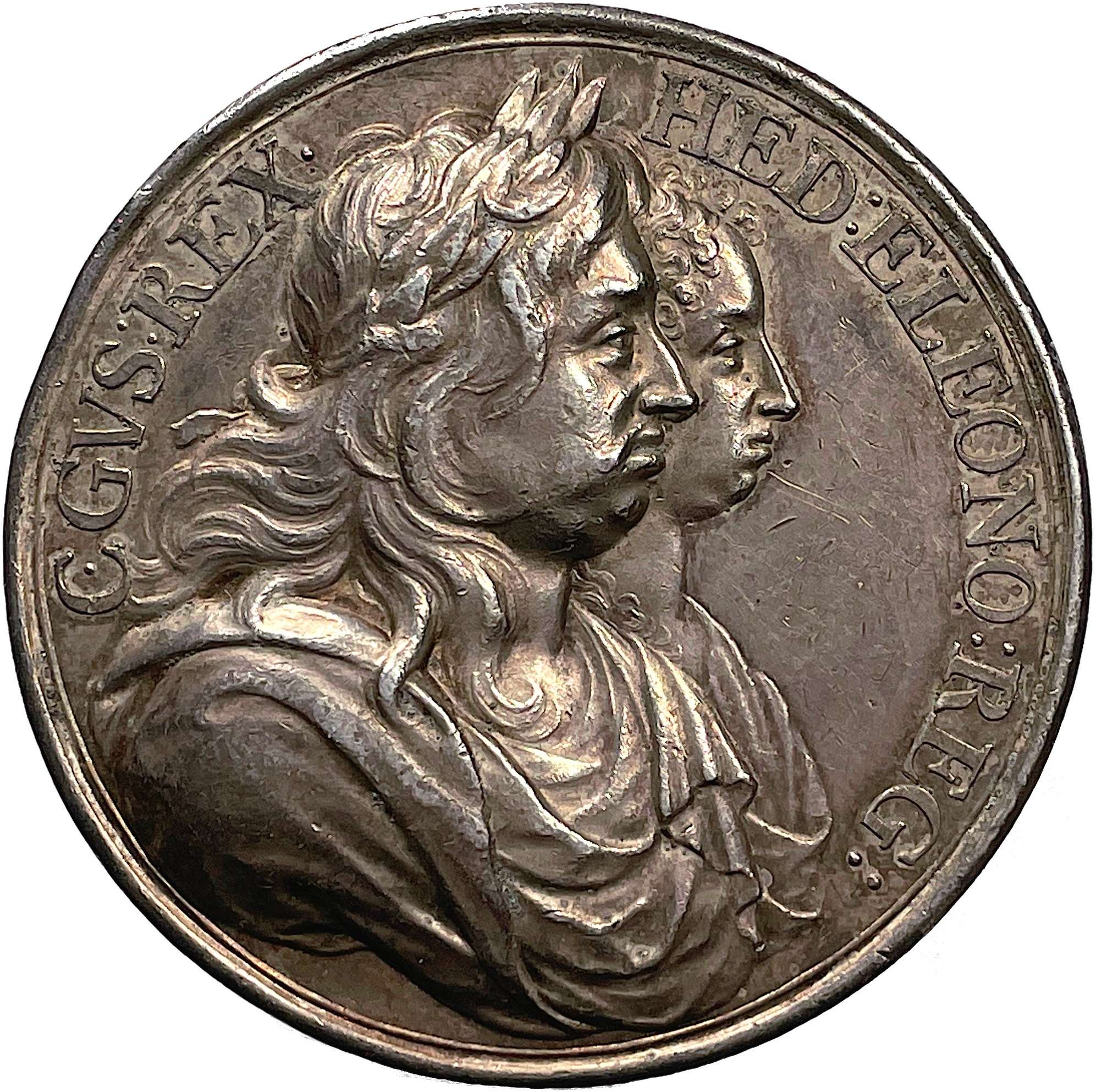
Posthumous medal from 1680 of King Charles X Gustav with his queen

Charles X Gustav had only one legitimate child by Hedwig Eleonora of Holstein-Gottorp: his successor Charles XI (1655–1697, reigned 1660–1697).

Before his marriage, his mistress Märta Allertz gave birth to their well-known son Gustaf Carlson (1647–1708), who became Count of Börringe and Lindholmen Castle in Scania.

There are credible theories suggesting that Charles X Gustav, before marrying Hedwig Eleonora (but not after), also sired several more children of whom some names are known: by Baroness Ludmila Jankovska von Lažan (1615–1655) a son Charles (Carolus Wenzeslaus) Jankovský z Vlašimi (1644–1684), who became Baron of Château Rešice in Moravia; by Walbor Staffansdotter son Nils Karlsson (who strongly resembled his father); by Sidonia Johansdotter son Samuel Karlsson and by an unknown woman daughter Anna Karlsdotter.

== Ancestry ==
Ancestors of Charles X Gustav

8. Wolfgang, Count Palatine of Zweibrücken
4. John I, Count Palatine of Zweibrücken
9. Anna of Hesse
2. John Casimir, Count Palatine of Kleeburg
10. William, Duke of Jülich-Cleves-Berg
5. Magdalene of Jülich-Cleves-Berg
11. Maria of Austria
1. Charles X Gustav, King of Sweden
12. Gustav I, King of Sweden
6. Charles IX, King of Sweden
13. Margaret Leijonhufvud
3. Catherine of Sweden
14. Louis VI, Elector Palatine
7. Maria of Palatinate-Simmern
15. Elisabeth of Hesse

== Sources ==
=== Bibliography ===
- Asmus, Ivo; Tenhaef, Peter (2006). "Die Trauerfeier an der Universität Greifswald am 11. Mai 1660 für Karl X. Gustav von Schweden. Historische und rhetorische Aspekte". In Walter Baumgartner (ed.). Ostsee-Barock. Texte und Kultur. Nordische Geschichte (in German). Vol. 4. Berlin: LIT Verlag. pp. 59–84. ISBN 978-3-8258-9987-5.
- Englund, Peter (2003). Den oövervinnerlige : om den svenska stormaktstiden och en man i dess mitt (in Swedish). Stockholm: Atlantis förlag. ISBN 978-9174867206.
- Granlund, Lis (2004). "Queen Hedwig Eleonora of Sweden: Dowager, Builder, and Collector". In Campbell Orr, Clarissa (ed.). Queenship in Europe 1660–1815: The Role of the Consort. Cambridge University Press. pp. 56–76. ISBN 0-521-81422-7.
- Asker, Björn (2009). Karl X Gustav: en biografi. Historiska Media. ISBN 9789185873807.

Attribution

Charles X Gustav House of Palatinate-Zweibrücken Cadet branch of the House of Wittelsbach Born: 8 November 1622 Died: 13 February 1660
Regnal titles
Preceded by Christina	King of Sweden; Duke of Bremen and Verden; 1654–1660	Succeeded by Charles XI
Preceded by John Casimir	Count Palatine of Kleeburg; 1652–1654	Succeeded by Adolph John I
