= Gustaf Carlson, Count of Börringe and Lindholm =

Swedish, Dutch and English noblemen and officer

Gustaf Carlson
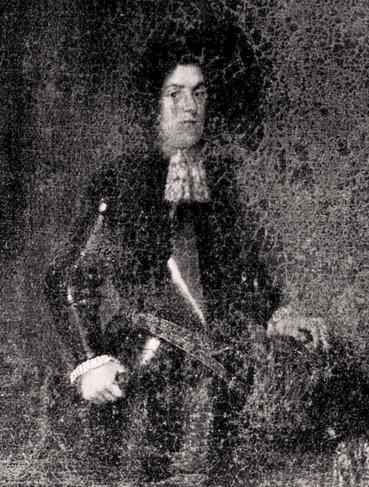
- Portrait by unknown artist from c. 1690

Military service
- Allegiance: Sweden; Dutch Republic; Kingdom of England
- Years of service: 1667–1690
- Rank: Lieutenant general
- Battles/wars: Franco-Dutch War; Scanian War; Glorious Revolution; Williamite War in Ireland
- Born: 1646; Stockholm, Sweden
- Died: 1 January 1708 (aged 61); Terherne, Dutch Republic
- Spouse: Isabella-Susanna von Schwartzenberg (m. 1685)
- House: House of Carlson
- Dynasty: Wittelsbach (illegitimate branch)
- Father: Charles X Gustav
- Mother: Märta Allertz
- Religion: Lutheran

Count Gustaf Carlson (1646 – 1 January 1708) was a nobleman and military officer. He was the eldest illegitimate son of Charles X Gustav of Sweden and his mistress Märta Allertz.

== Biography ==
=== Parentage and early life ===
He was first raised by Baron Carl Gyllenhielm, the illegitimate son of king Charles IX of Sweden. After Carl Gyllenheim's passing in 1650, he was raised by Samuel Enander, Bishop of Linköping, and by 1660, after the death of king Charles X Gustav, he also found himself under protection by the Queen dowager Hedwig Eleonora, whom became his guardian, with her stating that it was made "...to the heartfelt remembrance of his [past] lord".

Erik Lindschöld led his studies and in 1659–1668 accompanied him on a journey through Germany, the Netherlands, England, France and Italy.

=== Officer and command ===
By his 21st birthday in 1667, he joined the army of the Dutch Republic and fought in the Franco-Dutch War, until he returned to Sweden in 1674. During his absence in 1673, he was appointed colonel in the Uppland Regiment. During the Scanian War of 1675–79, Gustaf Carlson participated with distinction in the Battle of Lund and at Rügen in 1678, where he was head of an enlisted regiment.

In 1679 he was captured by Brandenburgian forces, and was sent back to Stockholm in 1680. But he soon abandoned Sweden after he became dissoluted after a couple of more years, probably out of outrage at not having received a privy council office, and that in the Great Reduction of his brother he was deprived of the large estates of Börringe and Lindholm, which he had received from his father.

=== William of Orange and later life ===
He soon went into Dutch war service. There he became a lieutenant general and married in 1685 at Ameland, he later accompanied William of Orange on his voyage to England, during the Glorious Revolution of 1688, and there fought by his side in the Williamite War in Ireland during 1690 as a close confidant of the king. He later went on to spend the remainder of his life in the Dutch province of Friesland, where he died without any surviving children in 1708 at his castle in Terherne, Boarnsterhim.

== Personal life ==
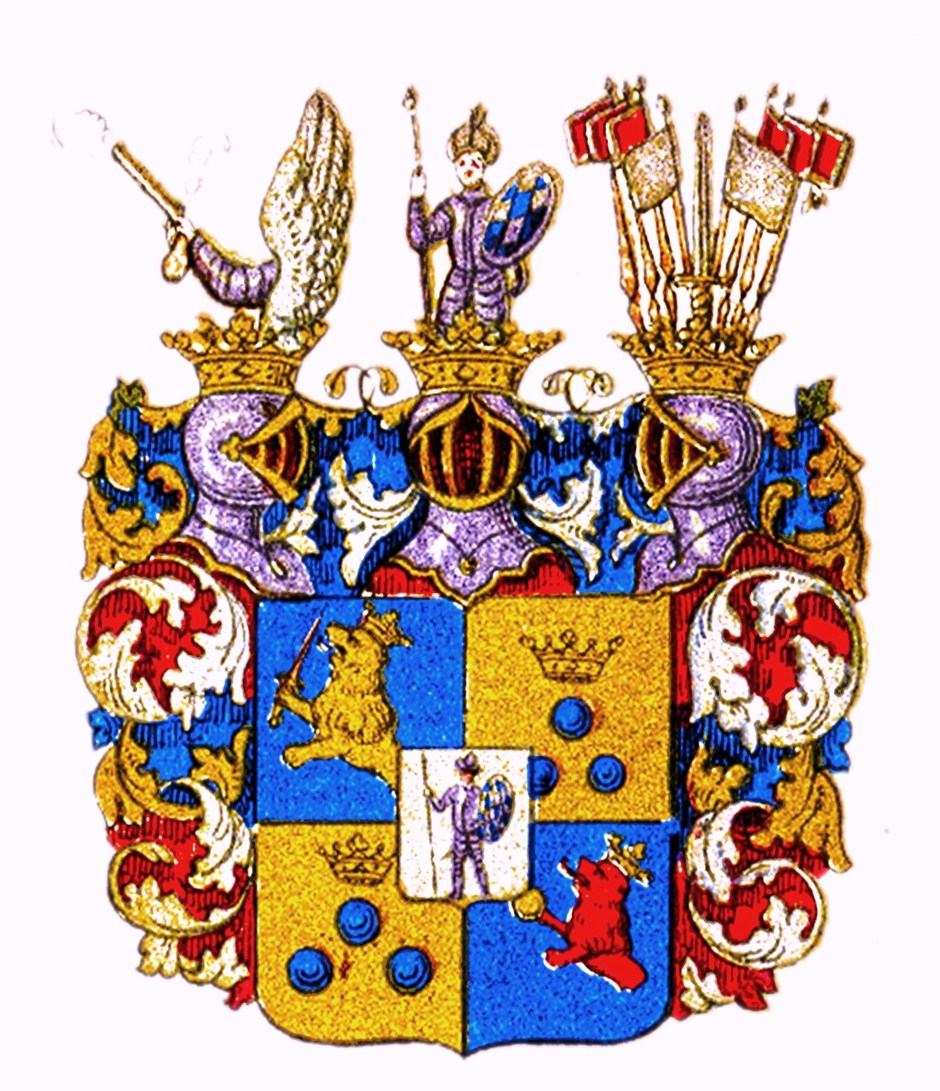
Coat of arms of the Count of Carlson.

By 1674 he had been elevated to the rank of count being given the name Gustaf Carlson, with Carlson as the house name of the comital family and with Börringe and Lindholmen as its counties. He was married to Baroness Isabella-Susanna von Schwartzenberg and their only child, a daughter, died before she had been baptized.
