= Eskilsø =

Island in Denmark

Coordinates: 55°44′00″N 12°04′45″E

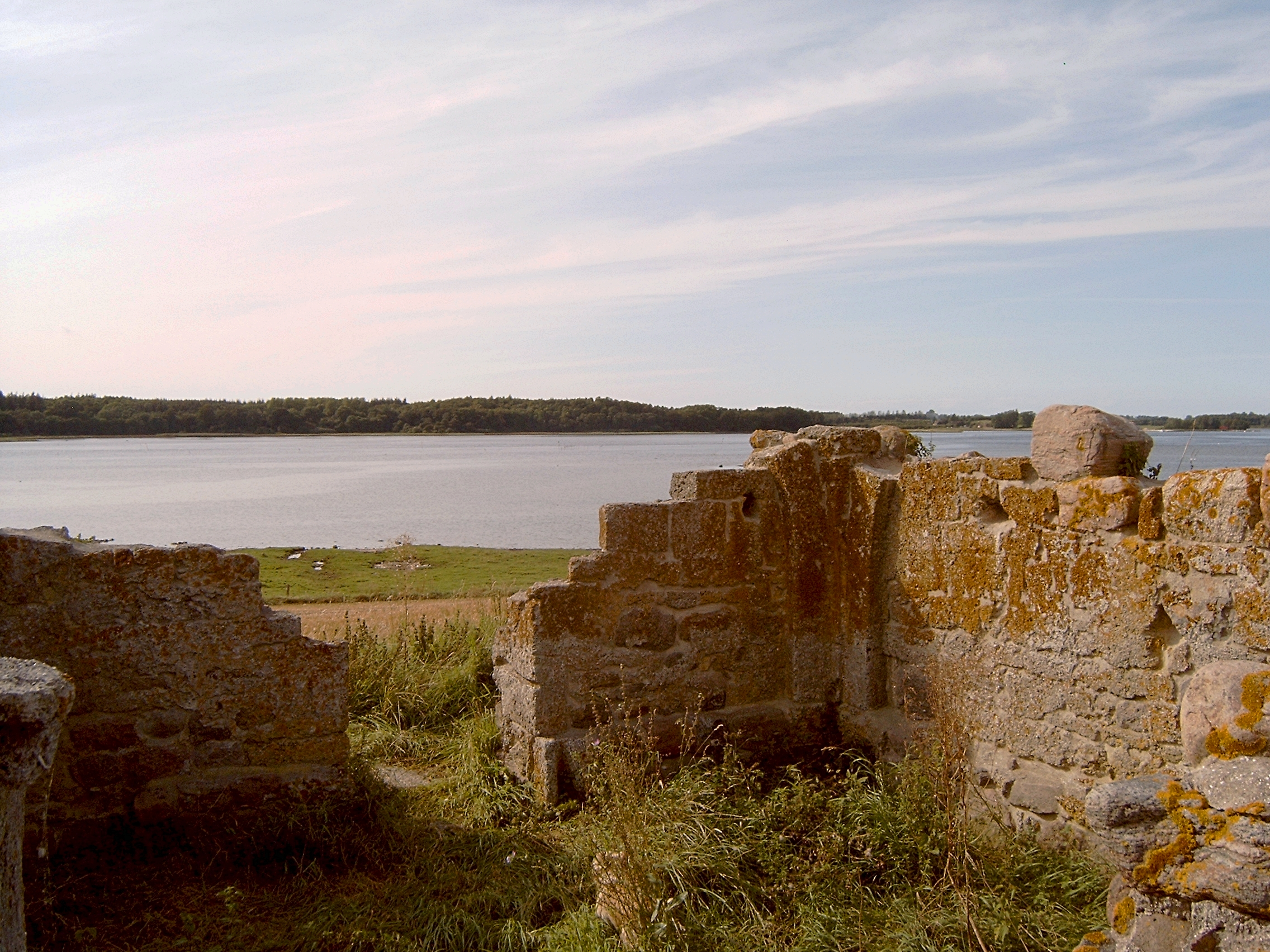
Monastery ruins on Eskilsø

Eskilsø is a small Danish island located in the Roskilde fjord, Frederikssund Municipality, northern Zealand.

In the 12th century, there was an Augustinian monastery, Eskilsø Monastery, on the island. The ruins of the monastery church are still visible.
