= Karl II Prince of Schwarzenberg =

Imperial Austrian noble and Feldzeugmeister

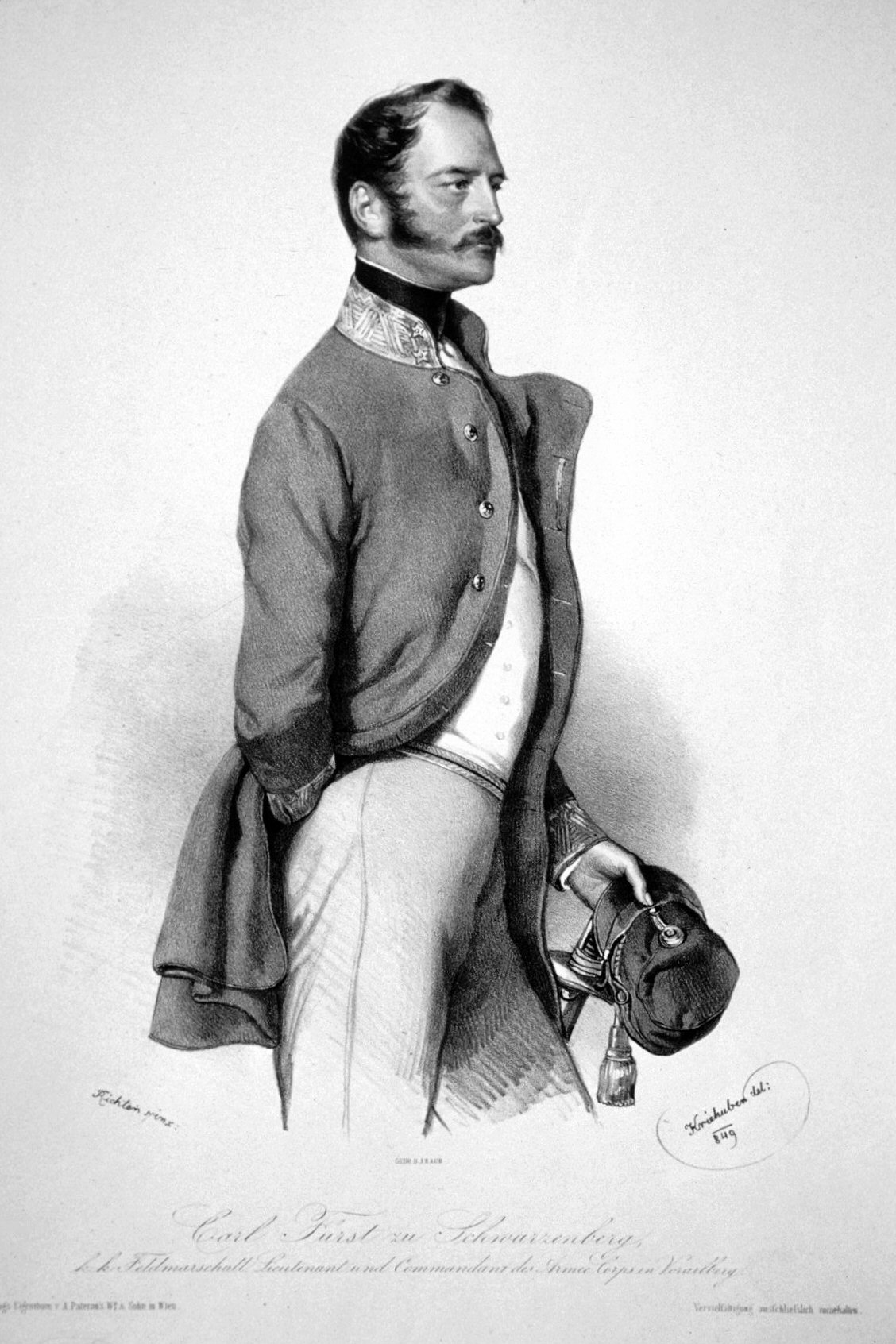
FML Karl zu Schwarzenberg, lithograph by Josef Kriehuber, 1849

Karl II Prince of Schwarzenberg (Karl Philipp Borromäus Prince of Schwarzenberg) (Vienna, 21 January 1802 - Vienna, 15 June 1858) was an Imperial Austrian noble and Feldzeugmeister, who fought in the First Italian War of Independence. He was Governor of Transylvania between 1851 and 1858.

== Biography ==
Karl was a son of the famous Field Marshal Karl Philipp, Prince of Schwarzenberg (1771–1822) and Countess Maria Anna von Hohenfeld (1768–1848).

His 2 brothers were Friedrich Karl (1800–1870) and Edmund zu Schwarzenberg (1803–1873), who also became a Field Marshal .

In mid-February 1821 he joined the Habsburg Army. In 1834 he became colonel and in 1840 he was promoted to major general and took over a brigade in Brno. At the beginning of January 1848, he was entrusted with the divisional command that had become vacant in Brescia, and on 7 February 1848 he was appointed Field Marshal Lieutenant (FML).

At the beginning of the First Italian War of Independence, there were uprisings against the Austrian rule in Brescia on 18 March 1848. On 22 March, Schwarzenberg and his troops left Brescia to join the Army of Field Marshal Count Radetzky, who was retreating from Milan. Schwarzenberg reached Crema on 24 March, where he united with the imperial main army and retreated further to Verona. Prince Schwarzenberg was then given command of a division of the I. Corps under FML Wratislaw von Mitrowitz. On 6 May, he was lightly wounded by a Sardinian bullet at the Battle of Santa Lucia. He distinguished himself again in the following campaign of 1849 as a division general with the I. Reserve Corps under FML Gustav von Wocher in the Battle of Novara.

After the Armistice of Vignale on 24 March 1849, he took command of an observation corps in Vorarlberg on 20 June, and after the Peace of Milan on 6 August 1849, he became acting governor and military governor of Lombardy in Milan on 16 October, he was also in Paullo. The following year, he was given command of the IV Corps on 18 December 1850, until he was appointed civil and military Governor of Transylvania on 29 April 1851.

In recognition of his services, he was awarded the Order of the Golden Fleece on 16 December 1852, and on 24 April 1854, he was promoted to Feldzeugmeister. The prince stayed in Transylvania until 1858, which he had to leave on 6 April due to a serious illness. A recovery cure in Karlsbad was already in vain, he died when he returned to Vienna at the end of June 1858.

=== Marriage and offspring ===
The prince had married on 26 July 1823 with Josephine Countess Wratislaw of Mitrovic (16 April 1802 - 17 April 1881). They had one son:

- Karl (III.) Joseph Adolph Prince of Schwarzenberg (5 July 1824 - 29 March 1904), Order of the Golden Fleece, great-great-grandfather of Czech politician Karel Schwarzenberg.

== Ancestry ==
Ancestors of Karl II Prince of Schwarzenberg

16. Adam Franz, 3rd Prince of Schwarzenberg
8. Joseph I Adam, 4th Prince of Schwarzenberg
17. Princess Eleonora Amalia of Lobkowicz
4. Johann Joseph I, 5th Prince of Schwarzenberg
18. Joseph Johann Adam, Prince of Liechtenstein
9. Princess Maria Theresia of Liechtenstein
19. Countess Maria Anna of Oettingen-Spielberg
2. Karl Philipp, Prince of Schwarzenberg
20. Count Anton Karl of Oettingen-Wallerstein
10. Count Philipp Karl of Oettingen-Wallerstein
21. Countess Maria Agnes Fugger of Kirchberg
5. Countess Maria Eleonora of Oettingen-Wallerstein
22. Count Kraft Anton of Oettingen-Baldern
11. Countess Charlotte Juliana of Oettingen-Baldern
23. Countess Johanna Maria of Schönborn-Buchheim
1. Karl II, Prince of Schwarzenberg
24. Count Otto Ferdinand von Hohenfeld
12. Count Otto Carl von Hohenfeld
25. Countess Maria Ernestina Serényi de Kis-Serény
6. Count Otto Franz von Hohenfeld
26. Marquis Scipione Guidi di Bagno
13. Countess Maria Teresa Guidi di Bagno
27. Countess Anna Eleonore von Wrbna und Freudenthal
3. Countess Maria Anna von Hohenfeld
28. Baron Franz Marquard von Stain zu Jettingen
14. Baron Franz Theodor vom Stain zu Jettingen
29. Baroness Anna Maria von und zu Guttenberg
7. Baroness Maria Anna Franziska vom Stain zu Jettingen
30. Baron Johann Werner Schenk von Stauffenberg
15. Baroness Franziska Schenk von Stauffenberg
31. Baroness Marie Sophie von Rosenbach

== Sources ==
- BLKÖ:Schwarzenberg, Karl Borromäus Philipp Fürst
- ÖBL:Schwarzenberg, Karl II. Fürst zu
- Geni.com
