= Adolf von Schwarzenberg =

General in the Holy Roman Empire, Count of Schwarzenberg

Field Marshal Adolf von Schwarzenberg Count of Schwarzenberg
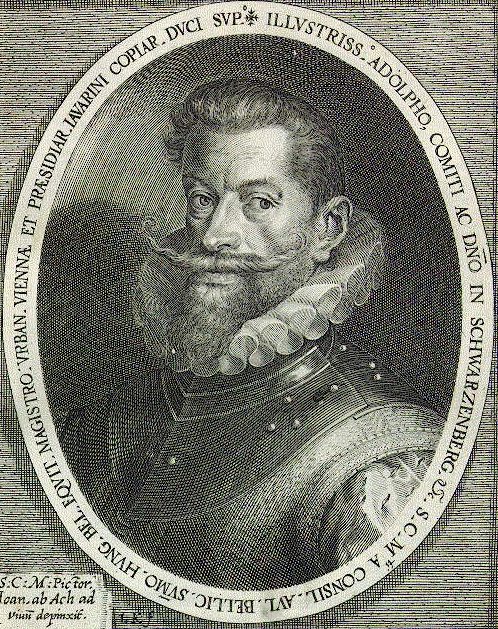
- Adolf, First count of Schwarzenberg
- Born: 1547; Gimborn, Marienheide, Duchy of Berg, Holy Roman Empire
- Died: 29 July 1600 (aged 52–53); Pápa, Kingdom of Hungary, Holy Roman Empire
- Burial place: Vienna Arsenal
- Children: Adam, Count of Schwarzenberg (son)
- Relatives: Johann Adolf, Prince of Schwarzenberg; Adam Franz; Ferdinand, Prince of Schwarzenberg; Joseph I Adam of Schwarzenberg; Johann I, Prince of Schwarzenberg; Karl Philipp, Prince of Schwarzenberg
- Military career
- Allegiance: Holy Roman Empire
- Rank: General
- Conflicts: European wars of religion; Ottoman–Habsburg wars; Long Turkish War; Pápa mutiny

Count Adolf von Schwarzenberg (1547 – 29 July 1600) was a general of the Holy Roman Empire whose sword, along with that of his descendant Prince Karl Philipp, is preserved in the arsenal of Vienna. He fought in the wars of religion, but was chiefly distinguished in the wars against the Turks on the eastern frontier. He was killed in a mutiny of the soldiers at Pápa in the Kingdom of Hungary in 1600 during the Long Turkish War.

His only son was Adam von Schwarzenberg (1583–1641), advisor of George William, Elector of Brandenburg during the Thirty Years' War.

== See also ==
- House of Schwarzenberg
