= Duchess Maria Anna Josepha of Bavaria =

Margravine of Baden-Baden from 1755 to 1761

Maria Anna Josepha of Bavaria
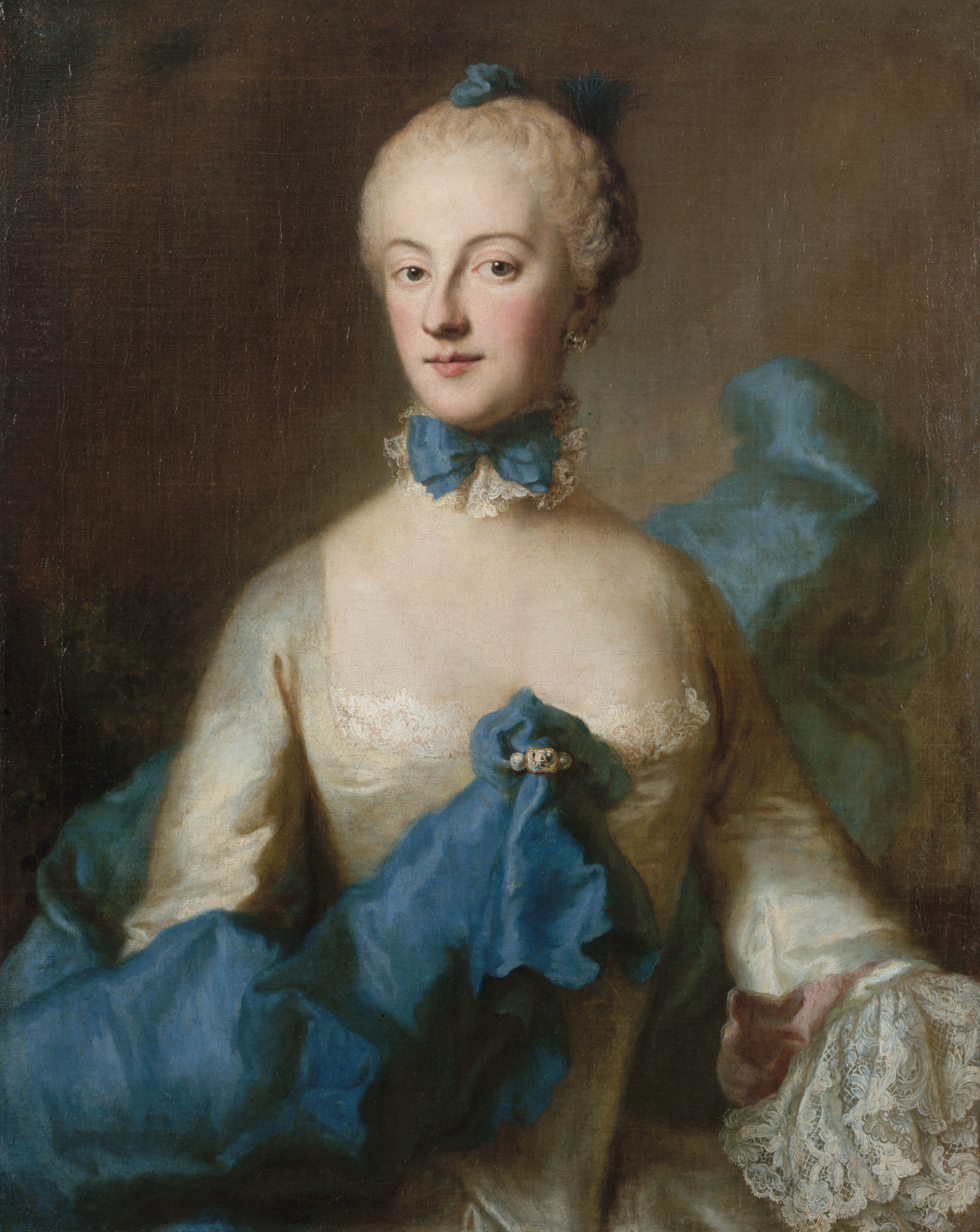
- Portrait by Georg Desmarées, c. 1755

Margravine consort of Baden-Baden
- Tenure: 20 July 1755 – 22 October 1761
- Born: 7 August 1734; Nymphenburg Palace, Munich
- Died: 7 May 1776 (aged 41); Nymphenburg Palace, Munich
- Burial: Theatine Church, Munich
- Spouse: Louis George, Margrave of Baden-Baden (m. 1755; died 1761)
- House: Wittelsbach
- Father: Charles VII, Holy Roman Emperor
- Mother: Maria Amalia of Austria

Maria Anna Josepha of Bavaria (Maria Anna Josepha Augusta; 7 August 1734 – 7 May 1776) was a Duchess of Bavaria by birth and Margravine of Baden-Baden by marriage. She was nicknamed the savior of Bavaria. She is also known as Maria Josepha and is sometimes styled as a princess of Bavaria.

== Biography ==
Maria Anna Josepha was born at the Nymphenburg Palace in 1734. She was the fifth child of Charles Albert of Bavaria (later Holy Roman Emperor) and his wife Maria Amalia of Austria. She was baptised with the names Maria Anna Josepha Augusta. A member of the House of Wittelsbach, rulers of the Electorate of Bavaria, she was styled a Duchess of Bavaria.

She married Louis George, Margrave of Baden-Baden, the ruling Margrave of Baden-Baden and son of the late Louis William of Baden-Baden and his wife Sibylle of Saxe-Lauenburg; the latter was the regent of Baden-Baden for the infant Louis George. The couple were married at the Schloss Ettlingen in Baden on 20 July 1755; the bride was aged 20, the groom 53. The couple remained childless; although Louis George did have one surviving daughter, Elisabeth, from his previous marriage, but as a female she was barred from the succession to the Margraviate.

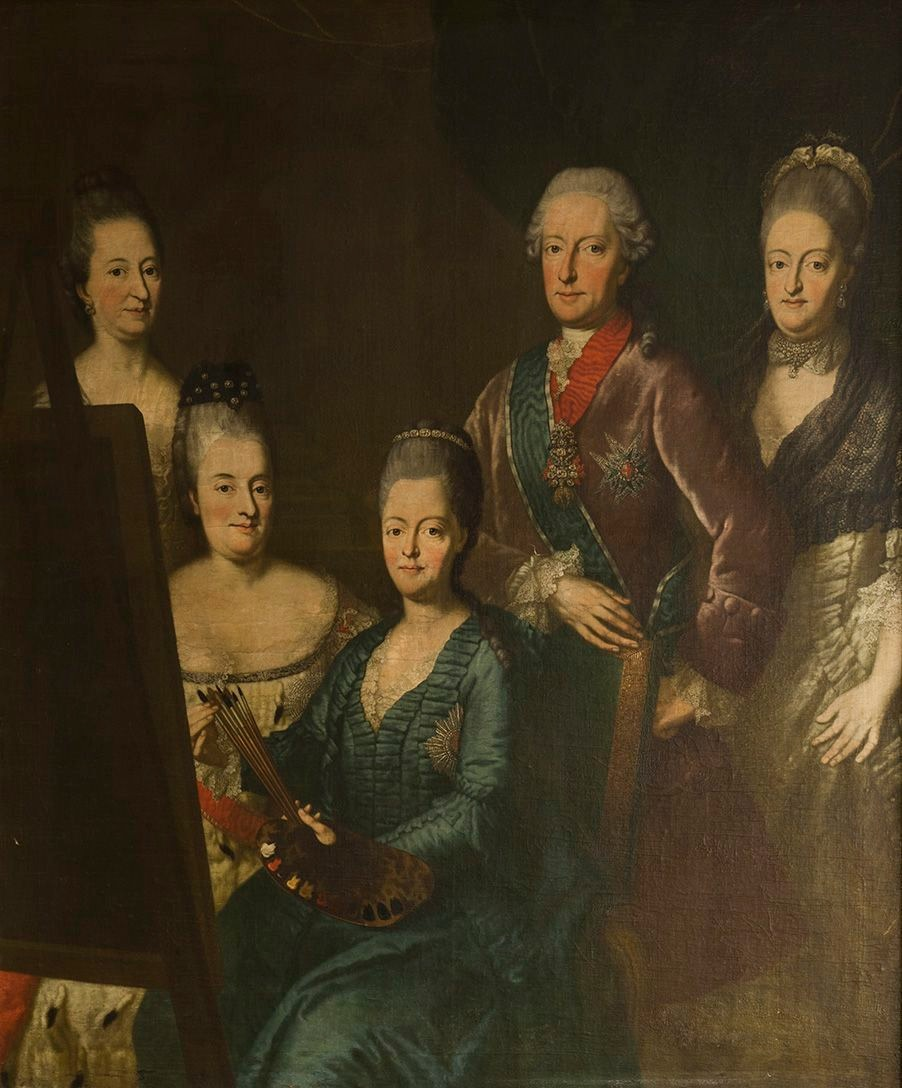
Maria Anna painted with some of her family members, (L–R), her aunt Maria Anna von Pfalz-Sulzbach; sister in law Maria Anna Sophia of Saxony; her sister Maria Antonia Walpurga; brother Maximilian III Joseph; and Maria Anna. Painted c. 1761–70.

Her husband had been married previously to Maria Anna of Schwarzenberg by whom he had four children but only one survived infancy. Maria Anna was the only daughter of Adam Franz, Prince of Schwarzenberg and Princess Eleonora of Lobkowicz. Her husband died in 1761 and was succeeded by his brother Augustus George, Margrave of Baden-Baden. As such, his wife the Belgian born Maria Victoire d'Arenberg became the most important female at the court of Baden-Baden.

Maria Anna developed a great passion for diplomacy. She forged links with Frederick II of Prussia in order to protect the Bavarian throne as her brother, Maximilian III Joseph, was childless and feared for the succession.

As a widow, Maria Anna Josepha returned to her native Bavaria where she died at the Nymphenburg Palace in Munich, over a year before her brother. She was buried at the Theatine Church, Munich, traditional burial place of Bavarian royalty.

== Ancestors ==
Ancestors of Duchess Maria Anna Josepha of Bavaria

8. Ferdinand Maria, Elector of Bavaria
4. Maximilian II Emanuel, Elector of Bavaria
9. Henriette Adelaide of Savoy
2. Charles VII, Holy Roman Emperor
10. John III Sobieski
5. Therese Kunigunde of Bavaria
11. Marie Casimire Louise de La Grange d'Arquien
1. Maria Anna Josepha of Bavaria
12. Leopold I, Holy Roman Emperor
6. Joseph I, Holy Roman Emperor
13. Eleonore-Magdalena of Pfalz-Neuburg
3. Maria Amalia of Austria
14. John Frederick, Duke of Brunswick-Lüneburg
7. Wilhelmina Amalia of Brunswick-Lüneburg
15. Benedicta Henrietta of the Palatinate

Duchess Maria Anna Josepha of Bavaria House of Wittelsbach Born: 7 August 1734 Died: 7 May 1776
Royal titles
Vacant Title last held by Maria Anna of Schwarzenberg	Margravine consort of Baden-Baden; 20 July 1755 – 22 October 1761	Succeeded by Marie Victoire d'Arenberg
