= Friedrich, Prince of Schwarzenberg =

Friedrich, Prince of Schwarzenberg could refer to:

- Friedrich, Prince of Schwarzenberg (soldier)
- Friedrich, Prince of Schwarzenberg (cardinal)
