= Friedrich, Prince of Schwarzenberg (soldier) =

Austrian prince (1800–1870)

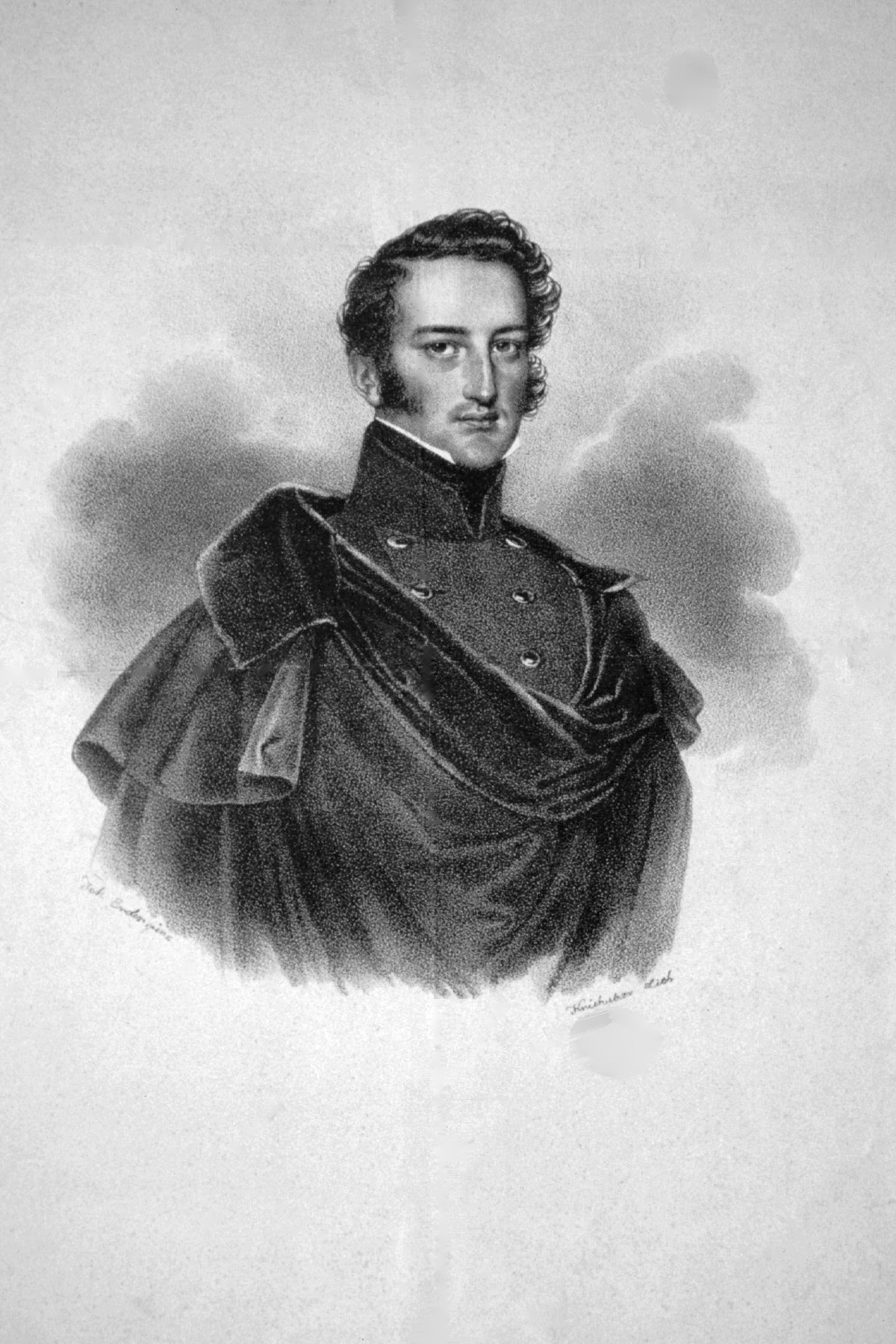
Lithograph from the 1830s

Friedrich, Prince of Schwarzenberg (Czech: kníže Bedřich Schwarzenberg; 30 September 1800 – 6 March 1870) had an adventurous career as a soldier, and described his wanderings and campaigns in several interesting works, of which the best known is his Wanderungen eines Lanzknechtes (1844–1845).

== Early life ==
Born into an illustrious House of Schwarzenberg, he was the eldest son of the famous Field Marshal Karl Philipp, Prince of Schwarzenberg and his wife Countess Maria Anna von Hohenfeld (1768–1848), widowed Princess Esterhazy.

== Biography ==
He took part as an Austrian officer in the campaigns of Galicia 1846, Italy 1848 and Hungary 1848, and as an amateur in the French conquest of Algeria, the Carlist Wars in Spain and the Swiss civil war of the Sonderbund. He became a major-general in the Austrian army in 1849, and died after many years of well-filled leisure in 1870.

Friedrich was briefly engaged to Princess Elisa Radziwill, but the engagement was called off.

== Ancestry ==
Ancestors of Friedrich, Prince of Schwarzenberg (soldier)

16. Adam Franz, 3rd Prince of Schwarzenberg
8. Joseph I Adam, 4th Prince of Schwarzenberg
17. Princess Eleonora Amalia of Lobkowicz
4. Johann Joseph I, 5th Prince of Schwarzenberg
18. Joseph Johann Adam, Prince of Liechtenstein
9. Princess Maria Theresia of Liechtenstein
19. Countess Maria Anna of Oettingen-Spielberg
2. Karl Philipp, Prince of Schwarzenberg
20. Count Anton Karl of Oettingen-Wallerstein
10. Count Philipp Karl of Oettingen-Wallerstein
21. Countess Maria Agnes Fugger of Kirchberg
5. Countess Maria Eleonora of Oettingen-Wallerstein
22. Count Kraft Anton of Oettingen-Baldern
11. Countess Charlotte Juliana of Oettingen-Baldern
23. Countess Johanna Maria of Schönborn-Buchheim
1. Friedrich, Prince of Schwarzenberg
24. Count Otto Ferdinand von Hohenfeld
12. Count Otto Carl von Hohenfeld
25. Countess Maria Ernestina Serényi de Kis-Serény
6. Count Otto Franz von Hohenfeld
26. Marquis Scipione Guidi di Bagno
13. Countess Maria Teresa Guidi di Bagno
27. Countess Anna Eleonore von Wrbna und Freudenthal
3. Countess Maria Anna von Hohenfeld
28. Baron Franz Marquard von Stain zu Jettingen
14. Baron Franz Theodor vom Stain zu Jettingen
29. Baroness Anna Maria von und zu Guttenberg
7. Baroness Maria Anna Franziska vom Stain zu Jettingen
30. Baron Johann Werner Schenk von Stauffenberg
15. Baroness Franziska Schenk von Stauffenberg
31. Baroness Marie Sophie von Rosenbach

== Sources ==
- ADB:Schwarzenberg, Friedrich Fürst zu (österreichischer General)
