= Ferdinand August von Lobkowicz =

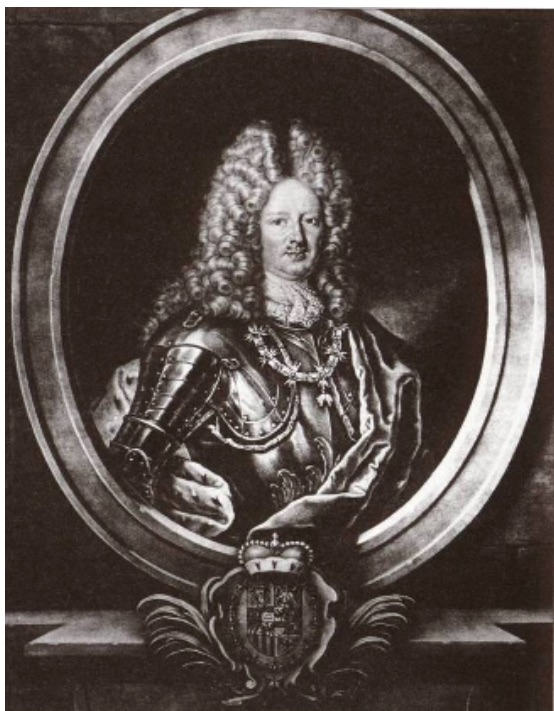
Portrait of Prince Ferdinand August von Lobkowicz as a diplomat, wearing an Order of the Golden Fleece, 18th c.

Ferdinand August von Lobkowicz (7 September 1655 – 3 October 1715) was a Bohemian nobleman and politician. He was member of the powerful Bohemian House of Lobkowicz and after 1677 he was Duke of Sagan.

== Biography ==
He was the eldest son of Václav Eusebius František, Prince of Lobkowicz (1609-1677) from his second marriage to Auguste Sophie of Pfalz-Sulzbach.

Prince Ferdinand August became Duke of Sagan when his father died in 1677. He became a Privy Councillor and a Knight of the Golden Fleece in 1689. He was Principal Commissioner at the Perpetual Diet of Regensburg in 1691. From 1699 to 1708 he was Grand Master of the Court to Empress Wilhelmine Amalie.

Because he refused to recognize the Elector of Bavaria as his overlord, the latter confiscated his estate of Schönsee, located in the Upper Palatinate. In return, after Elector Maximilian II Emanuel of Bavaria had declared him an outlaw, he received the lordships of Wertingen and Hohenreichen in Swabia as an Austrian fief in 1710, but lost them again in 1713 after the Peace of Utrecht, without receiving any compensation.

== Marriage and children ==
From his four marriages, he had 13 children: 6 sons and 7 daughters.

In his first marriage, which took place on 18 July 1677 in Hadamar, he married Countess Claudia Franziska of Nassau-Hadamar (1660–1680), daughter of Maurice Henry, Prince of Nassau-Hadamar. The following children were born from this marriage:

- Eleonora von Lobkowicz (1678–1678)
- Leopold Kristian von Lobkowicz (1679–1680)
- Phillip Hyacinth von Lobkowicz (1680–1737), his successor. Had issue.

In his second marriage, on 17 July 1680, he wed Princess Marie Anne Wilhelmine of Baden-Baden (1655–1702), daughter of William, Margrave of Baden-Baden. Children from this marriage were:

- Josef Antonín von Lobkowicz (1681–1717), killed in the Siege of Belgrade (1717)
- Eleonore Elisabeth Amalia Magdalena von Lobkowicz (1682–1741), married Adam Franz of Schwarzenberg. Had issue.
- Maria Ludovika Anna von Lobkowicz (1683–1750), married Anselm Franz, 2nd Prince of Thurn and Taxis. Had issue
- Ferdinand von Lobkowicz (1685–1686)
- Johann Georg Christian, Prince of Lobkowicz (1686–1755). Field Marshal. married Countess Henriette of Waldstein-Wartenberg. Had issue.
- Hedvika von Lobkowicz (1688–1689)
- Augusta von Lobkowicz (1690–1691)
- Karel von Lobkowicz (1692–1700)

In his third marriage, on 3 December 1703, he married Countess Marie Philippine of Althann (1671–1706), daughter of Count Michael Wenzel von Althann, who served as an Imperial Privy Councillor. This marriage remained childless.

In his fourth marriage, on 16 November 1707, he married Princess Maria Johanna of Schwarzenberg (1681–1739), daughter of Ferdinand, Prince of Schwarzenberg, who served as an Hofmarschall of the Imperial court. Children from this marriage were:

- Marie (1711–1713)
- Marie Ernestina (1714–1718).
