= Joseph I Adam of Schwarzenberg =

German-Bohemian nobleman

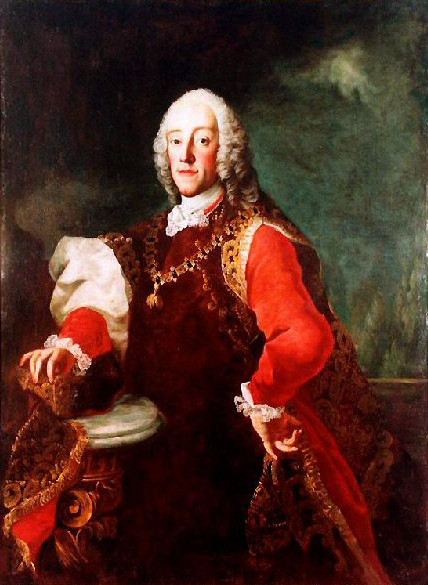
Painting of Joseph I Adam, 4th Prince of Schwarzenberg

Joseph Adam's wife: Princess Maria Theresia von und zu Liechtenstein

Joseph I Adam Prince of Schwarzenberg (15 December 1722, Vienna – 17 February 1782, Vienna), 4th Prince of Schwarzenberg, was a German-Bohemian nobleman.

== Biography ==
Joseph I was born as the son of Adam Franz Karl, 3rd Prince of Schwarzenberg and his wife, Princess Eleonore von Lobkowicz (1682–1741).

Following his father's death in a hunting accident, Joseph I was crowned the 4th Prince of Schwarzenberg at the age of 10, succeeding his father. He also obtained the title of a Knight in the Order of the Golden Fleece. He was K.u.K. Chamberlain, Geheimrat, Obersthofmeister of Empress Maria Theresa and, finally, Staats- und Konferenzminister.

Joseph I of Schwarzenberg married on 22 August 1741 in Mariaschein near Teplice, Maria Theresia von und zu Liechtenstein (28 December 1721 – 19 January 1753), the daughter of Joseph Johann Adam, Prince of Liechtenstein and Countess Maria Anna von Oettingen-Spielberg. Soon afterwards he and his wife built the church in Postelberg, out of gratitude for the birth of an heir. In 1767 Joseph I bought the Neuschloss estate.

On 5 December 1746 for Bohemia and on 8 December 1746 for the Holy Roman Empire, Joseph I of Schwarzenberg received the prince's diploma, extended to the effect that all marital male and female descendants were allowed to use the title "prince" or "princess" and was thus raised to the rank of imperial prince and the status of a Bohemian prince.

=== Children ===
Joseph of Schwarzenberg fathered four sons and five daughters:

- Johann I, Prince of Schwarzenberg (3 July 1742 – 5 October 1789), 5th Prince of Schwarzenberg
- Maria Anna (6 January 1744 – 8 August 1803), married in 1764 to Count Ludwig von Zinzendorf
- Josef Wenzel (26 March 1745 – 4 April 1764)
- Anton (11 April 1746 – 7 March 1764)
- Maria Theresa (30 April 1747 – 21 January 1788), married to Count Siegmund von Goëss
- Marie Eleonore (13 May 1748 – 3 May 1786)
- Franz Josef (8 August 1749 – 14 August 1750)
- Maria Josepha (24 October 1751 – 7 April 1755)
- Marie Ernestine (18 October 1752 – 12 April 1801), married to Prince Franz Xaver von Auersperg

== Ancestry ==
Ancestors of Joseph I Adam of Schwarzenberg

16. Adam, 2nd Count of Schwarzenberg
8. Johann Adolf, 1st Prince of Schwarzenberg
17. Margaret Hartrad von Pallant zu Larochette und Möstroff
4. Ferdinand Wilhelm, 2nd Prince of Schwarzenberg
18. Baron Ludwig von Starhemberg
9. Baroness Maria Justina von Starhemberg
19. Baroness Barbara von Herberstein
2. Adam Franz, 3rd Prince of Schwarzenberg
20. Karl Ludwig Ernst, Count of Sulz-Klettgau
10. Johann Ludwig II, Count of Sulz-Klettgau
21. Countess Maria Elisabeth of Hohenzollern-Sigmaringen
5. Countess Maria Anna von Sulz-Klettgau
22. Count Johann Georg von Königsegg-Aulendorf
11. Countess Maria Elisabeth von Königsegg-Aulendorf
23. Countess Eleonore von Hohenems
1. Joseph I, 4th Prince of Schwarzenberg
24. Zdenek Adalbert, 1st Prince of Lobkowicz
12. Wenzel Eusebius, 2nd Prince of Lobkowicz
25. Polyxena von Pernstein
6. Ferdinand August, 3rd Prince of Lobkowicz
26. Augustus, Count Palatine of Sulzbach
13. Auguste Sophie, Countess Palatine of Sulzbach
27. Princess Hedwig of Schleswig-Holstein-Gottorp
3. Princess Eleonora Amalia of Lobkowicz
28. Margrave Edward Fortunatus of Baden
14. William, Margrave of Baden-Baden
29. Maria von der Eicken-Rivieren
7. Marie Anna of Baden-Baden
30. Ernest I, Count of Oettingen-Baldern
15. Countess Maria Magdalena of Oettingen-Baldern
31. Countess Catherine von Helfenstein-Wiesensteig

== Sources ==
- BLKÖ:Schwarzenberg, Joseph Adam Johann Nepomuk Fürst
