= Louis George, Margrave of Baden-Baden =

German nobleman (1702–1761)

Louis George
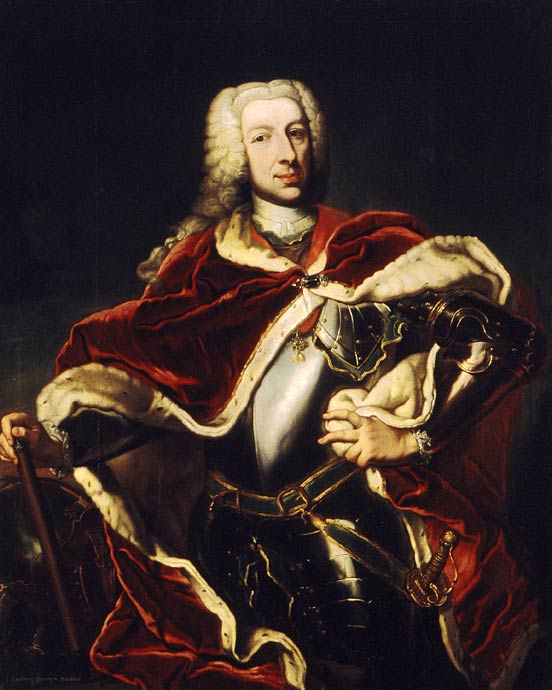
- Portrait of Louis George, 18th century

Margrave of Baden-Baden
- Reign: 4 January 1707 – 22 October 1761
- Predecessor: Louis William
- Successor: Augustus George
- Born: 7 June 1702; Schloss Ettlingen, Germany
- Died: 22 October 1761 (aged 59); Schloss Rastatt, Germany
- Burial: Stiftskirche, Baden-Baden
- Spouse: Maria Anna of Schwarzenberg (m. 1721; died 1755) Duchess Maria Anna Josepha of Bavaria (m. 1755)
- Issue: Elisabeth, Countess of Althann
- House: Zähringen
- Father: Louis William of Baden-Baden
- Mother: Sibylle of Saxe-Lauenburg
- Religion: Roman Catholicism

Louis George, Margrave of Baden-Baden (German: Ludwig Georg Simpert; 7 June 1702 – 22 October 1761) was a German nobleman and the Margrave of Baden-Baden from 1707 until his death in 1761. From 1707 to 1727, his mother Sibylle of Saxe-Lauenburg was the regent of Baden-Baden. He was succeeded by his younger brother, Augustus George. He was nicknamed Jägerlouis (the "hunter Louis") because of his passion for hunting.

== Biography ==
He was born at the Ettlingen Palace and was the son of Louis William, Margrave of Baden-Baden and his wife, Princess Sibylle of Saxe-Lauenburg. Hereditary Prince of Baden-Baden from birth, at the death of his father in 1707, he succeeded as Margrave of Baden-Baden at the age of four. As such, his mother was regent of Baden-Baden while he was a minor. He reached his majority on 22 October 1727 at the age of 25.

At the age of 16 years, the young prince was in love with Marie Leszczyńska, daughter of the former king of Poland but the couple were never to unite. Marie was later the consort of Louis XV of France. His sister Johanna was later a resident of the French court and wife of Louis d'Orléans, a grandson of their father's enemy Louis XIV.

As an unmarried prince, in the summer of 1720 he and his mother travelled to Prague where he would meet his future spouse (first of two) at the Schloss Hluboka nad Vltavou.

The chosen bride was Princess Maria Anna of Schwarzenberg, a daughter of Prince Adam Franz of Schwarzenberg and Princess Eleonore of Lobkowicz. His mother travelled to Vienna in order to seek permission from Charles VI, Holy Roman Emperor. Permission was granted and he married Maria Anna on 8 April 1721 at the Český Krumlov Castle. The couple were the parents of four children, of whom only one survive infancy. As a wedding gift, his mother gave him her hunting lodge at Fremersberg.

At Maria Anna's death in 1755, he married again to Princess Maria Anna of Bavaria on 10 July 1755. She was the daughter of Charles VII, Holy Roman Emperor and his Austrian wife Archduchess Maria Amalia. The second marriage remained childless.

Thanks to his mother, Baden-Baden was once again a prosperous state, having been ravaged by the French at the time of his parents' marriage in the 1690s.

Due to his mothers careful handling of the state's finances, the state was no longer in debt and had considerably enlarged Louis George's personal fortune. His mother retired to the Schloss Ettlingen where she died in 1733.

The son of a famous military general, Louis George's main passion was for hunting (much like his contemporary Louis XV) and was nicknamed Jägerlouis, the "hunter Louis", a play on his father's nickname Türkenlouis ("Turk Louis") due to his famous efforts against Louis XIV in the field and as part of the Imperial Army.

Louis George, from 1707 till 1731 was the Royal Colonel of the 4th Circle Infantry Regiment (mixt.) of the Swabian Circle but during the War of the Polish Succession, he hunted dear to his possessions in Bohemia. He returned only after 1735 in Vienna closed preliminary peace of the Treaty of Vienna.

He died at the Schloss Rastatt in October 1761 at the age of 59. He was succeeded by his brother George Augustus having no surviving male issue. He was buried at the Stiftskirche in Baden-Baden beside his first wife. Maria Anna Josepha retired to Munich where she died in 1776 and was buried at the Theatine Church.

== Issue ==
1. Elisabeth Augusta (Rastatt, 16 March 1726 – Freiburg, 7 January 1789), married on 2 February 1755 to Michael Wenzel, Count of Althann, Imperial Privy Councilor; no issue.
2. Charles Louis Damian (Rastatt, 25 August 1728 – Carlsbad, 6 July 1734), Hereditary Prince of Baden-Baden.
3. Louis George (Schlackenwerth, 11 August 1736 – Rastatt, 11 March 1737), Hereditary Prince of Baden-Baden.
4. Johanna (Rastatt, 28 April 1737 – Rastatt, 29 April 1737).

== Ancestors ==
Ancestors of Louis George, Margrave of Baden-Baden

8. William, Margrave of Baden-Baden
4. Ferdinand Maximilian, Hereditary Prince of Baden-Baden
9. Catherine Ursula of Hohenzollern–Hechingen
2. Louis William, Margrave of Baden-Baden
10. Thomas Francis, Prince of Carignano
5. Princess Louise of Savoy
11. Marie de Bourbon, Countess of Soissons
1. Louis George, Margrave of Baden-Baden
12. Julius Henry, Duke of Saxe-Lauenburg
6. Julius Francis, Duke of Saxe-Lauenburg
13. Anna Magdalene, Lady of Lobkowicz
3. Sibylle of Saxe-Lauenburg
14. Christian Augustus, Count Palatine of Sulzbach
7. Hedwig of Palatine-Sulzbach
15. Amalie of Nassau-Siegen

Louis George, Margrave of Baden-Baden House of Zähringen Born: 7 June 1702 Died: 22 October 1761
Preceded by Louis William	Margrave of Baden-Baden; 1707–1761	Succeeded by Augustus George Simpert
