= Maria Anna of Schwarzenberg =

Margravine of Baden-Baden (1706–1755)

Maria Anna
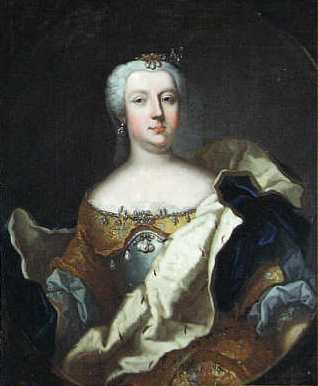
- Portrait, c. 1730–39

Margravine consort of Baden-Baden
- Tenure: 8 April 1721 – 12 January 1755
- Born: 25 December 1706
- Died: 12 January 1755 (aged 48)
- Spouse: Louis George, Margrave of Baden-Baden
- Issue: Elisabeth, Countess of Althann
- House: Schwarzenberg
- Father: Adam Franz, Prince of Schwarzenberg
- Mother: Princess Eleonora of Lobkowicz

Princess Maria Anna von Schwarzenberg (25 December 1706 – 12 January 1755) was a Margravine consort of Baden-Baden and Princess of Schwarzenberg by birth. She was the daughter of Prince Adam Franz von Schwarzenberg and Princess Eleonore von Lobkowicz.

She married Louis George, Margrave of Baden-Baden on 18 March 1721. Her future mother-in-law traveled to Vienna in order to seek permission from Charles VI, Holy Roman Emperor. Permission was granted, and she married on 8 April 1721 at the Český Krumlov Castle.

== Issue ==
- Princess Elisabeth Augusta of Baden-Baden (16 March 1726 – 7 January 1789); married on 2 February 1755 to Count Michael Wenzel of Althann, Imperial Privy Councilor; no issue.
- Karl Ludwig Damian, Hereditary Prince of Baden-Baden (25 August 1728 – 6 July 1734); died in infancy.
- Georg Ludwig, Hereditary Prince of Baden-Baden (11 August 1736 – 11 March 1737); died in infancy.
- Princess Johanna of Baden-Baden (28 April 1737 – 29 April 1737); died in infancy.

Vacant Title last held by Sibylle of Saxe-Lauenburg	Margravine consort of Baden-Baden; 18 March 1721 – 12 January 1755	Vacant Title next held by Maria Anna Josepha of Bavaria
