= Johann Lukas von Hildebrandt =

Austrian baroque architect and military engineer

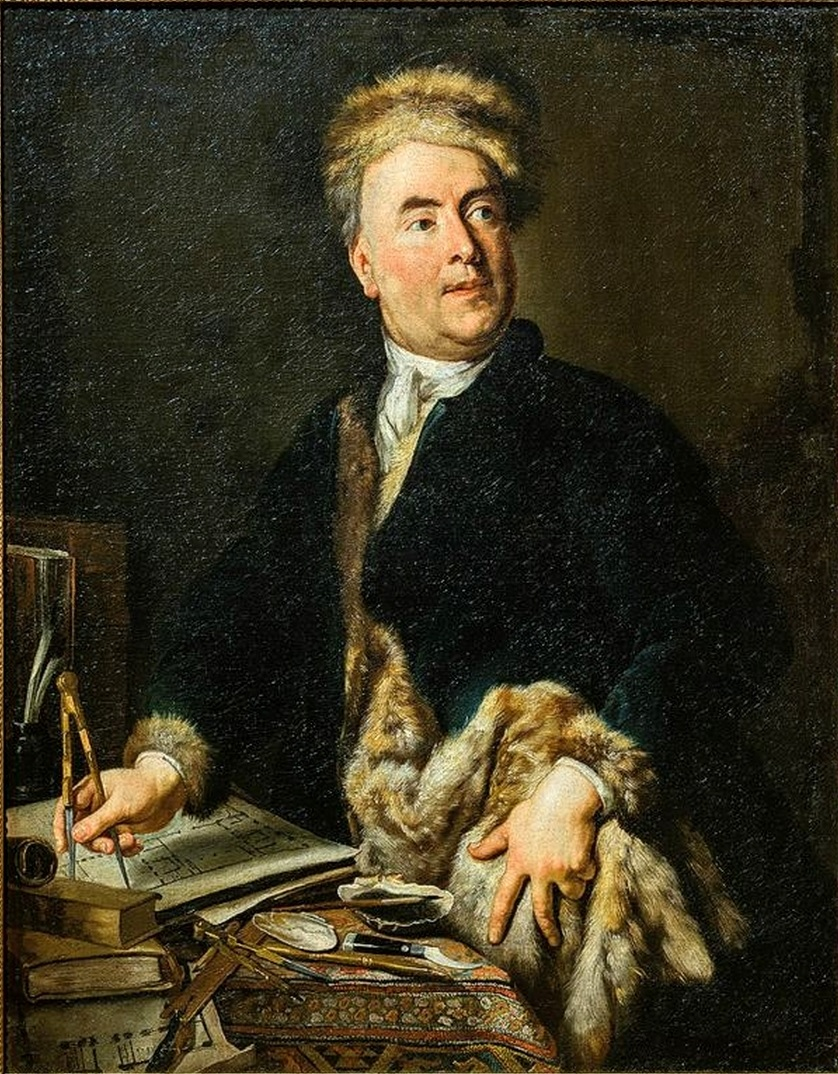
- Portrait of Hildebrandt, part of the Wawel Castle collection in Kraków
- Born: 14 November 1668; Genoa, Republic of Genoa
- Died: 16 November 1745 (aged 77); Vienna, Austria
- Occupation: Architect
- Buildings: St. Peter's Church, Vienna; Palais Schwarzenberg; Belvedere

Johann Lukas von Hildebrandt (14 November 1668 – 16 November 1745) was an Austrian baroque architect and military engineer who designed stately buildings and churches and whose work had a profound influence on the architecture of the Habsburg Empire in the eighteenth century. After studying in Rome under Carlo Fontana, he constructed fortresses for Prince Eugene of Savoy during his Italian campaigns, becoming his favourite architect. In 1700, he became court engineer in Vienna, and in 1711 was named head of the court department of building. He became the court architect in 1723. His designs for palaces, estates, gardens, churches, chapels, and villas were widely imitated, and his architectural principles spread throughout central and southeast Europe. Among his more important works are Palais Schwarzenberg, St. Peter's Church, and Belvedere in Vienna, Savoy Castle in Ráckeve, Schönborn Palace in Göllersdorf, and Schloss Hof.

== Life ==
Johann Lukas von Hildebrandt was born on 14 November 1668 in Genoa (Republic of Genoa).

Hildebrandt was the son of an Italian mother and a German father. As a young man, he moved to Rome, where he studied architecture under Carlo Fontana and military engineering under Colonel Carlo Cerutti. During 1695–6 he took part in three of Prince Eugene of Savoy’s campaigns in Piedmont as a volunteer engineer. In 1696, he settled in the Austrian capital, Vienna, where he became the favourite architect of Prince Eugene and worked for such noble families as the Dauns, Harrachs, Schönborns, and Starhembergs.

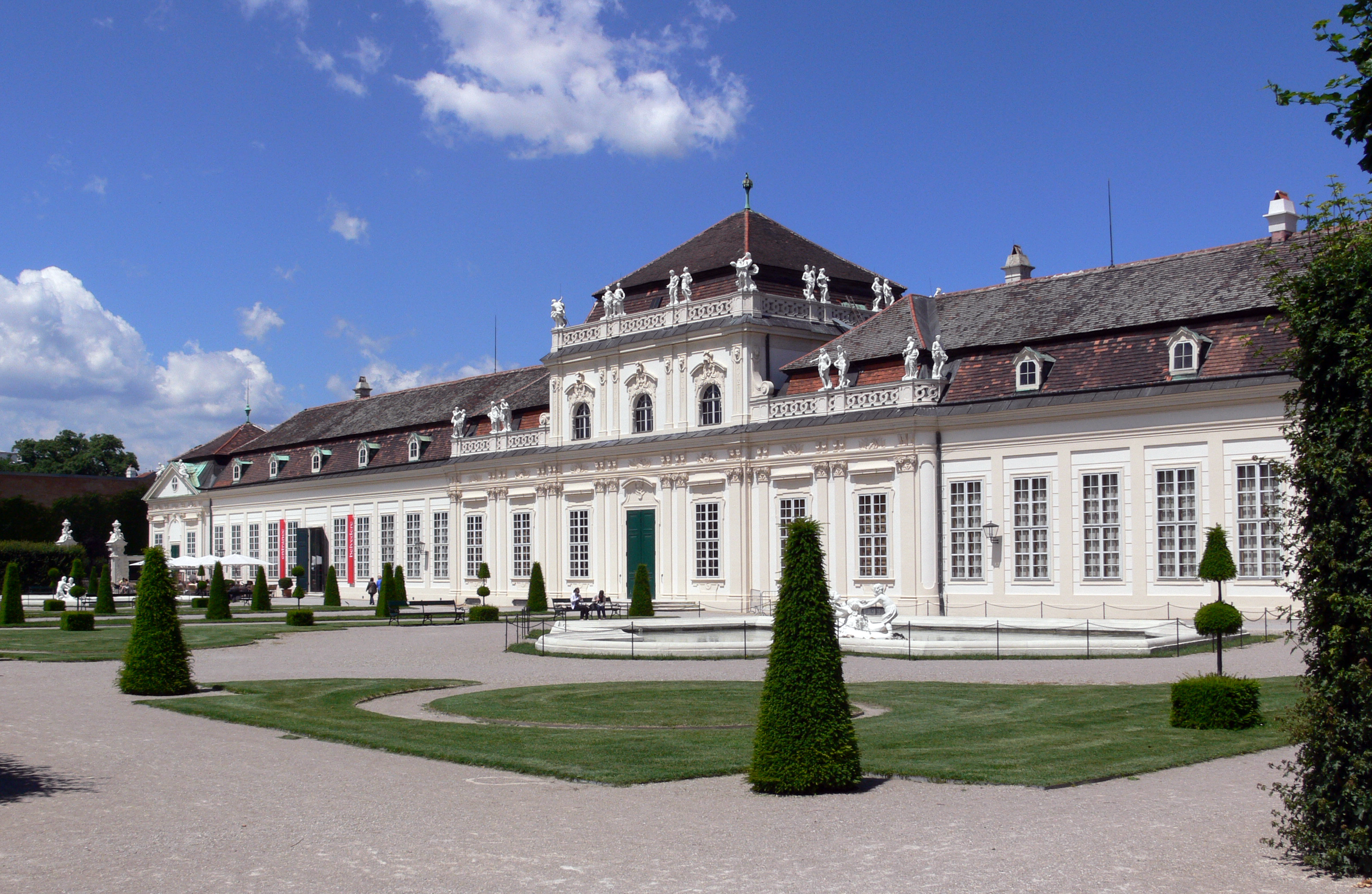
Lower Belvedere in Vienna

Hildebrandt became a court engineer at the Hofburg in 1700 and head of the court's building department in 1711. He was promoted to court architect in 1723. Struggling to compete with Johann Bernhard Fischer von Erlach and his son Joseph Emanuel, who dominated state and court architecture, Hildebrandt built his reputation working for prominent Viennese families. Unlike the monumental works of his rivals, his designs were more personal and included more decorative elements. This helped his popularity spread to the middle class. Hildebrandt united Italian and French elements and shaped the development of the baroque style in south Germany and Austria.

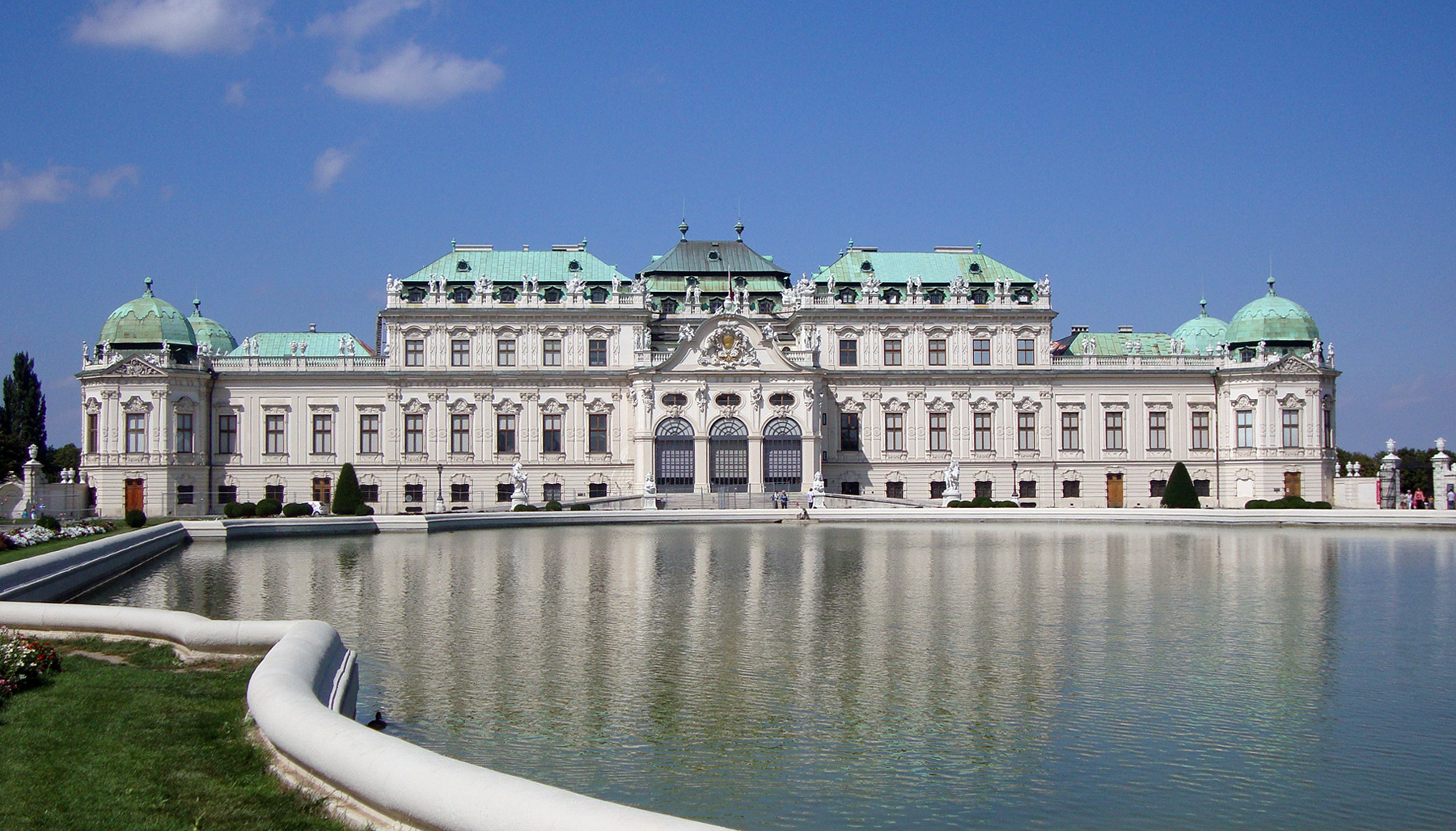
Upper Belvedere Palace

Hildebrandt was also involved in many great projects which were developed by other architects (e.g. Würzburg, Göttweig Abbey, Pommersfelden, Palais Schwarzenberg).

From 1713 to 1716, he was employed by the wealthy and powerful Kinsky family of Austria, building their residence, the Palais Kinsky, in Vienna. From 1723 on, he was inspector-general of the imperial buildings. His two best-known works, the Upper Belvedere (1721–1722) and the Lower Belvedere (1714–1716), were both commissioned by Prince Eugene of Savoy.

Hildebrandt also worked in Bavaria on the Pommersfelden castle known as Schloss Weißenstein.

Hildebrandt built numerous city palaces in Vienna (e.g. Daun-Kinsky, 1716), his religious buildings are also of great importance (St. Peter's Church and Maria Treu Piaristenchurch in Vienna, Teutonic Church in Linz, or Dominican Church in Gabel, Czech Republic).

Johann Lukas von Hildebrandt died on 16 November 1745 in Vienna.

== Selected works ==
- Winter Palace of Prince Eugene, Vienna, Austria, 1695–98
- Sankt Laurentius, Jablonné v Podještedí, Czech Republic, 1699
- Loreto Chapel, Rumburk, Czech Republic, 1704-1709
- Palais Starhemberg-Schönburg, Vienna, Austria, 1705–06
- Palais Auersperg, Vienna, Austria, 1706–10
- Lower Belvedere, Vienna, Austria, 1714–16
- Piarist Church of Maria Treu, Vienna, Austria, 1716
- Schönborn Palace, Göllersdorf, Austria, 1712–17
- Geheime Hofkanzlei (Bundeskanzleramt), Vienna, Austria, 1717–19
- Imperial Crypt, Vienna, Austria, 1710–20
- Savoy Castle, Ráckeve, Hungary, 1702–22
- Promontor Palace, Budafok, Hungary
- Palais Schwarzenberg, Vienna, Austria, 1697–1723
- Upper Belvedere, Vienna, Austria, 1721–23
- Deutschordenskirche Heilig Kreuz (Priesterseminarkirche), Linz, Austria, 1718–25
- Palais Kinsky, Vienna, Austria, 1713–26
- Schloss Hof, Schloßhof, Austria, 1729
- Hofburg, Reichskanzleitrakt, Vienna, Austria, 1723–30
- St. Peter's Church, Vienna, Austria, 1702–33
- Palais Harrach, Pavillon and Januariuskapelle, Vienna, Austria, 1727–35
- Parish Church, Göllersdorf, Austria, 1740–41
- Würzburg Residence, Würzburg, Germany, 1720–44
- Haus zum Goldenen Adler, Wroclaw, Poland, 1750

== Gallery ==
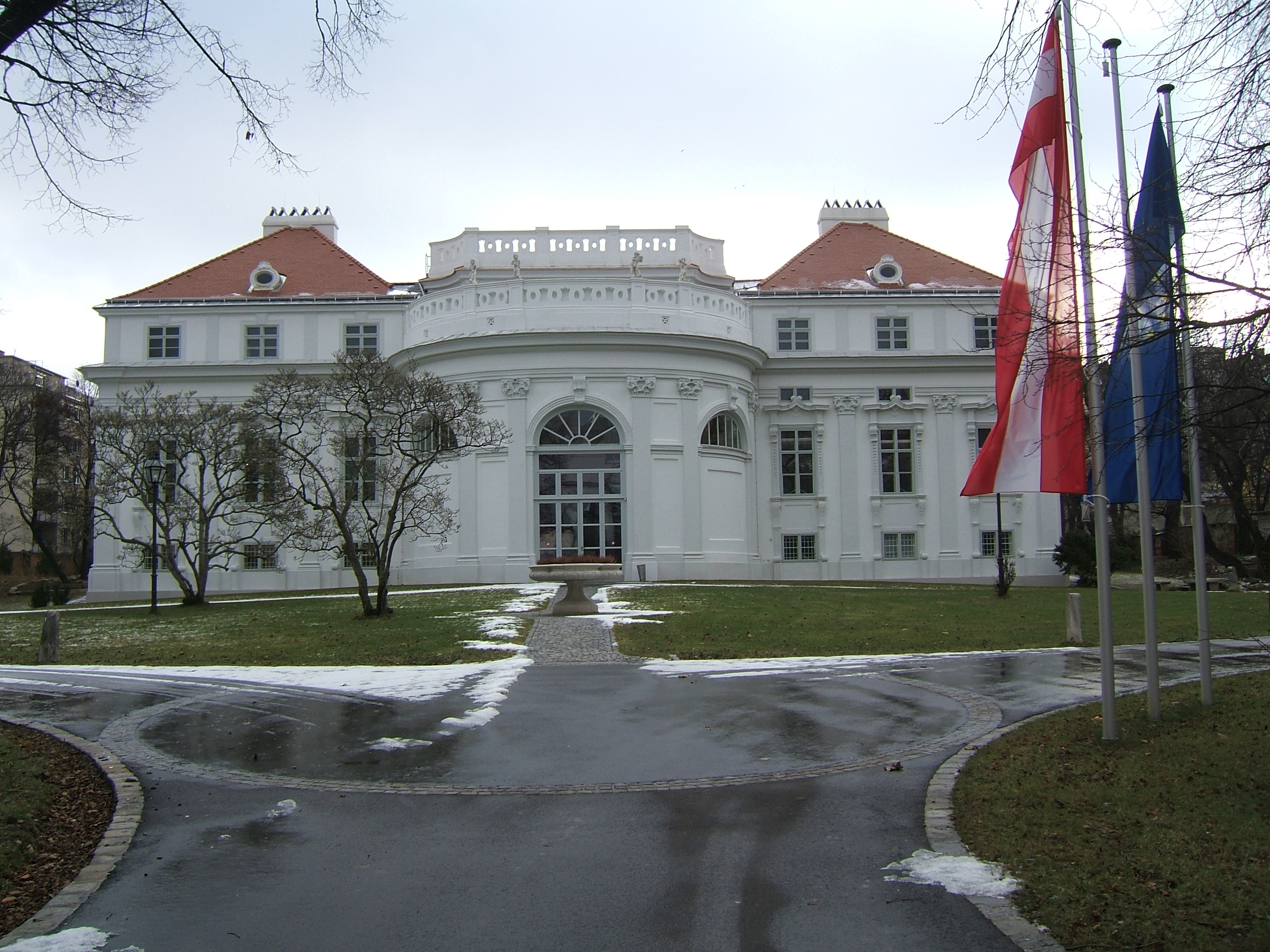
Palais Schönburg-Rainergasse

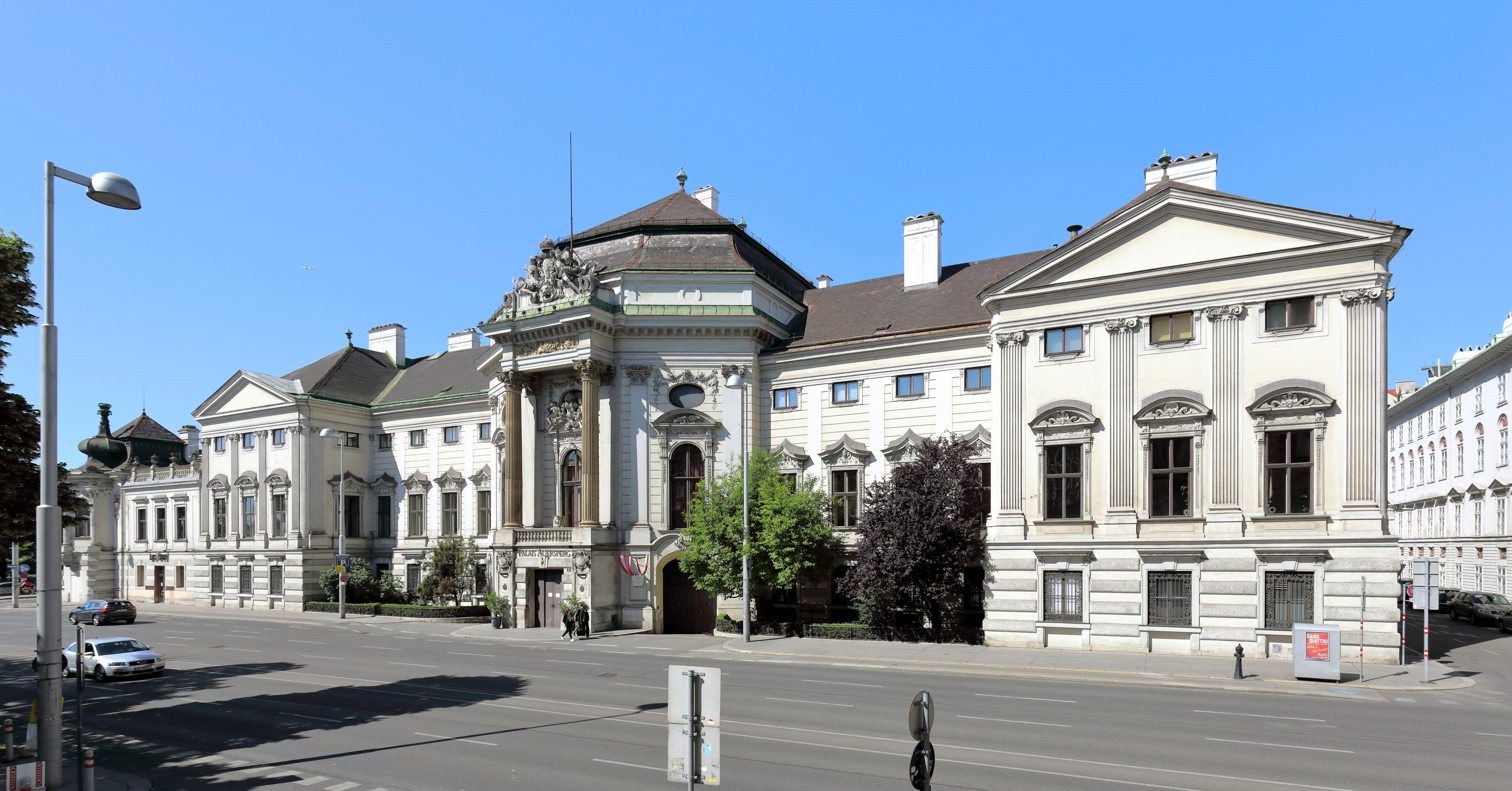
Palais Auersperg

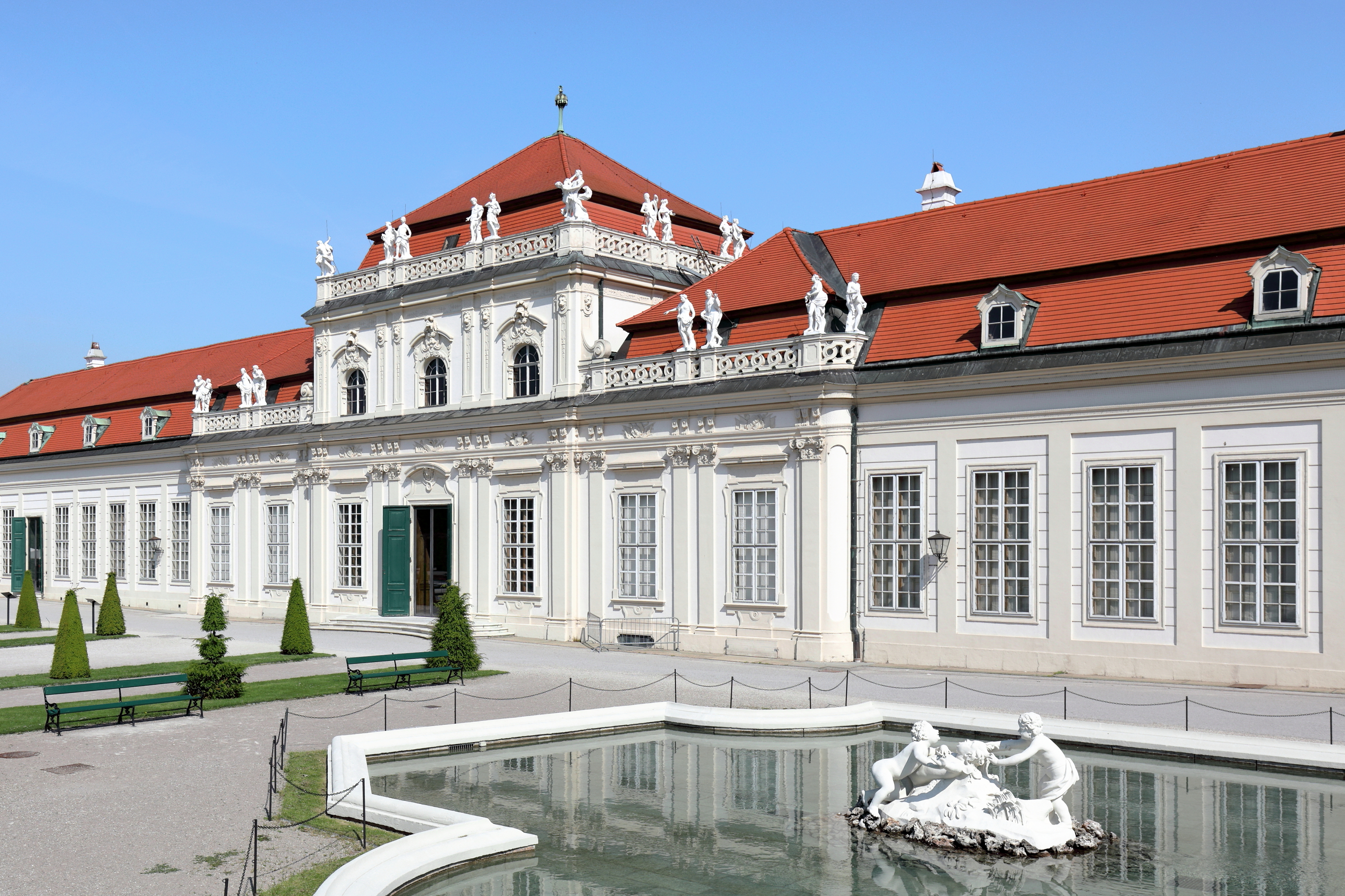
Lower Belvedere

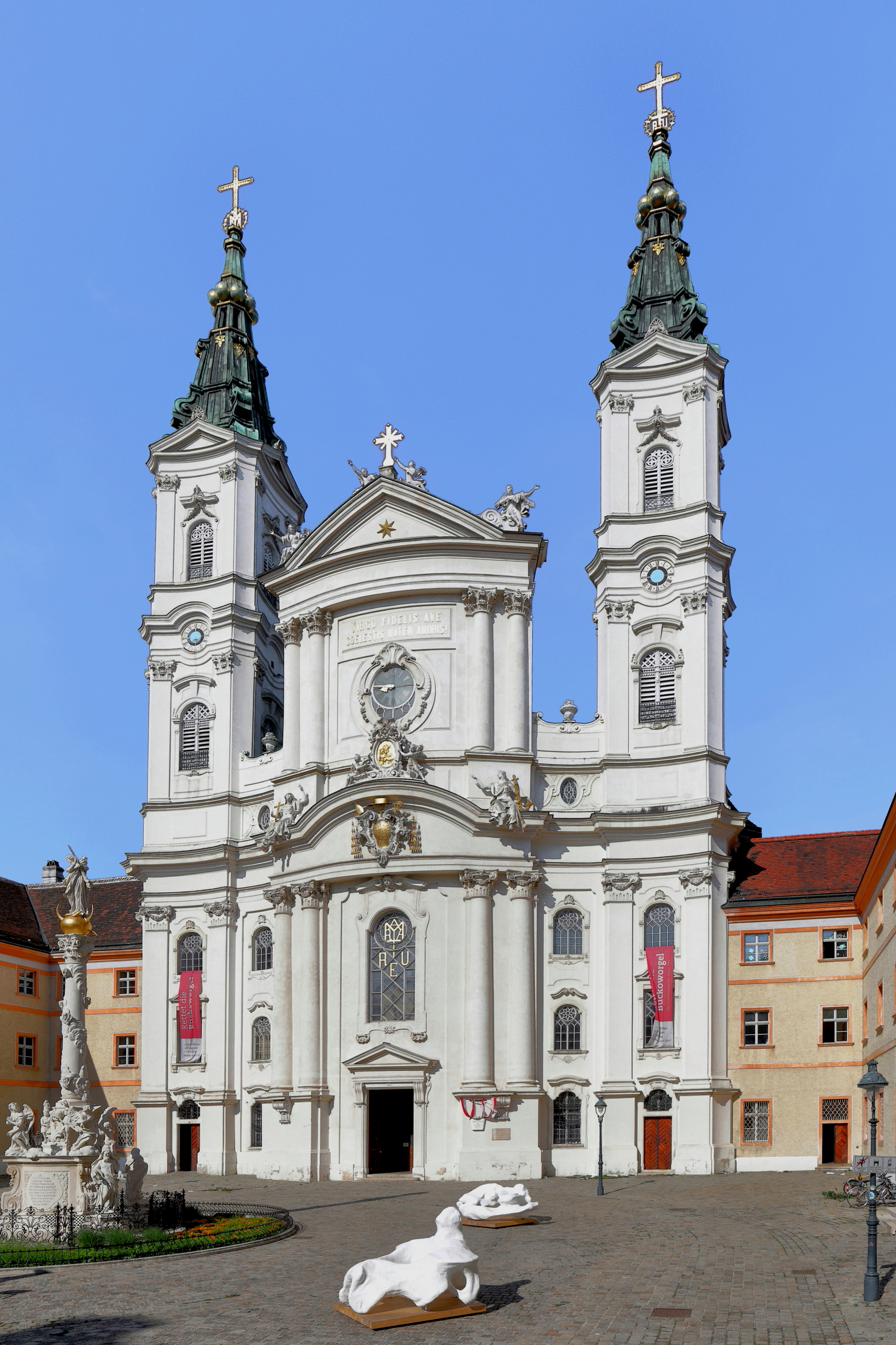
Piarist Church

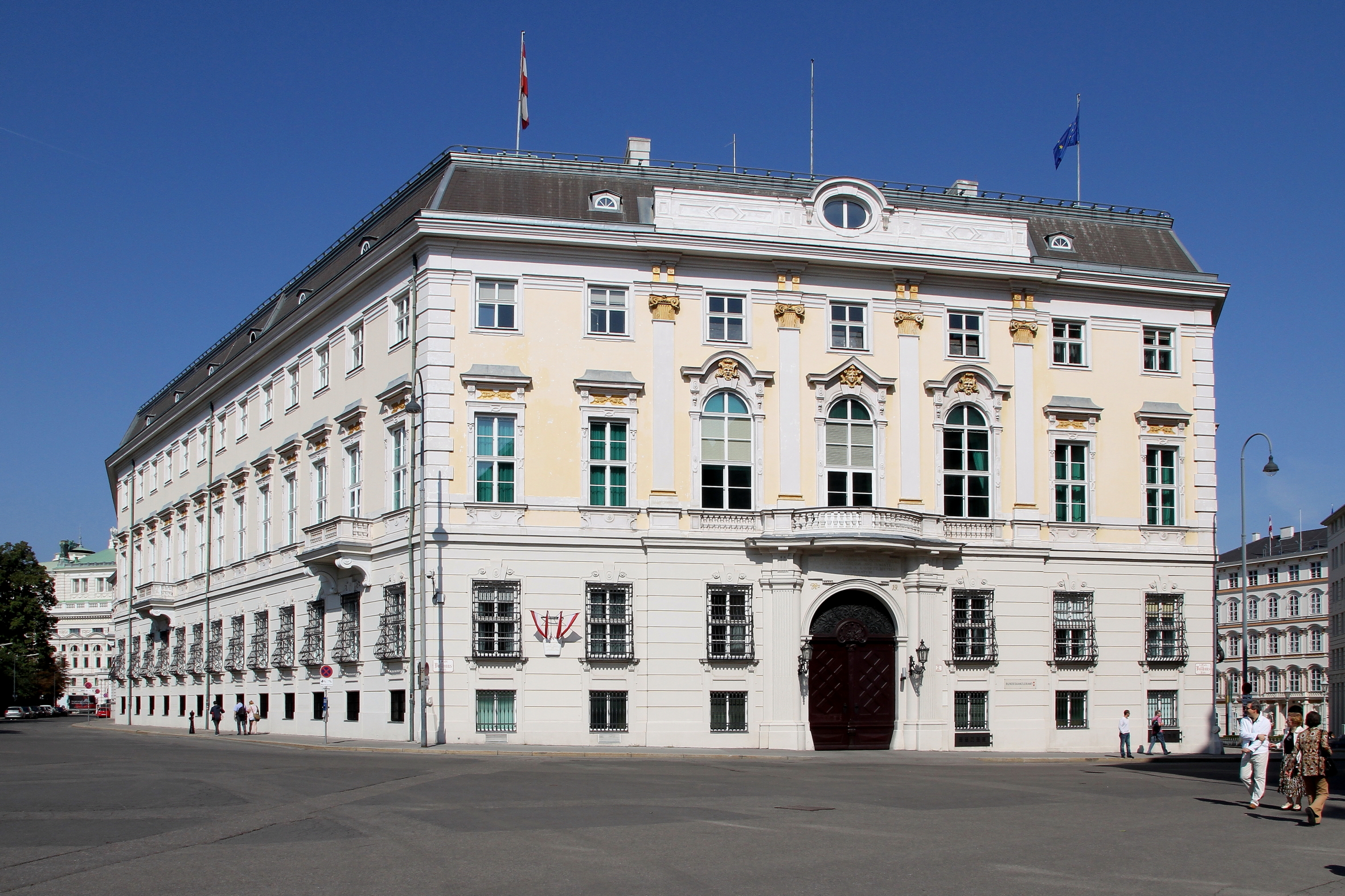
Bundeskanzleramt

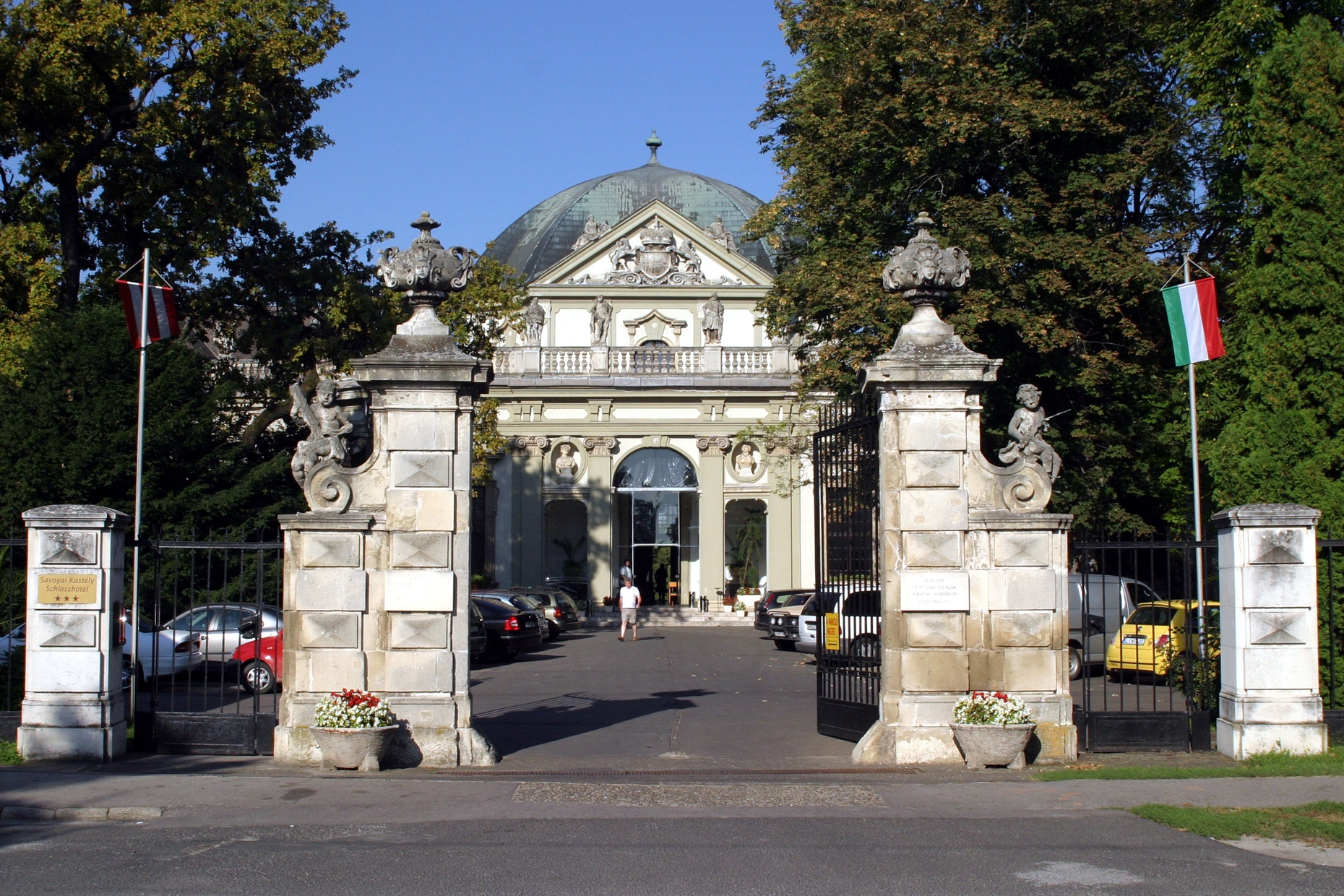
Savoy Castle, Ráckeve

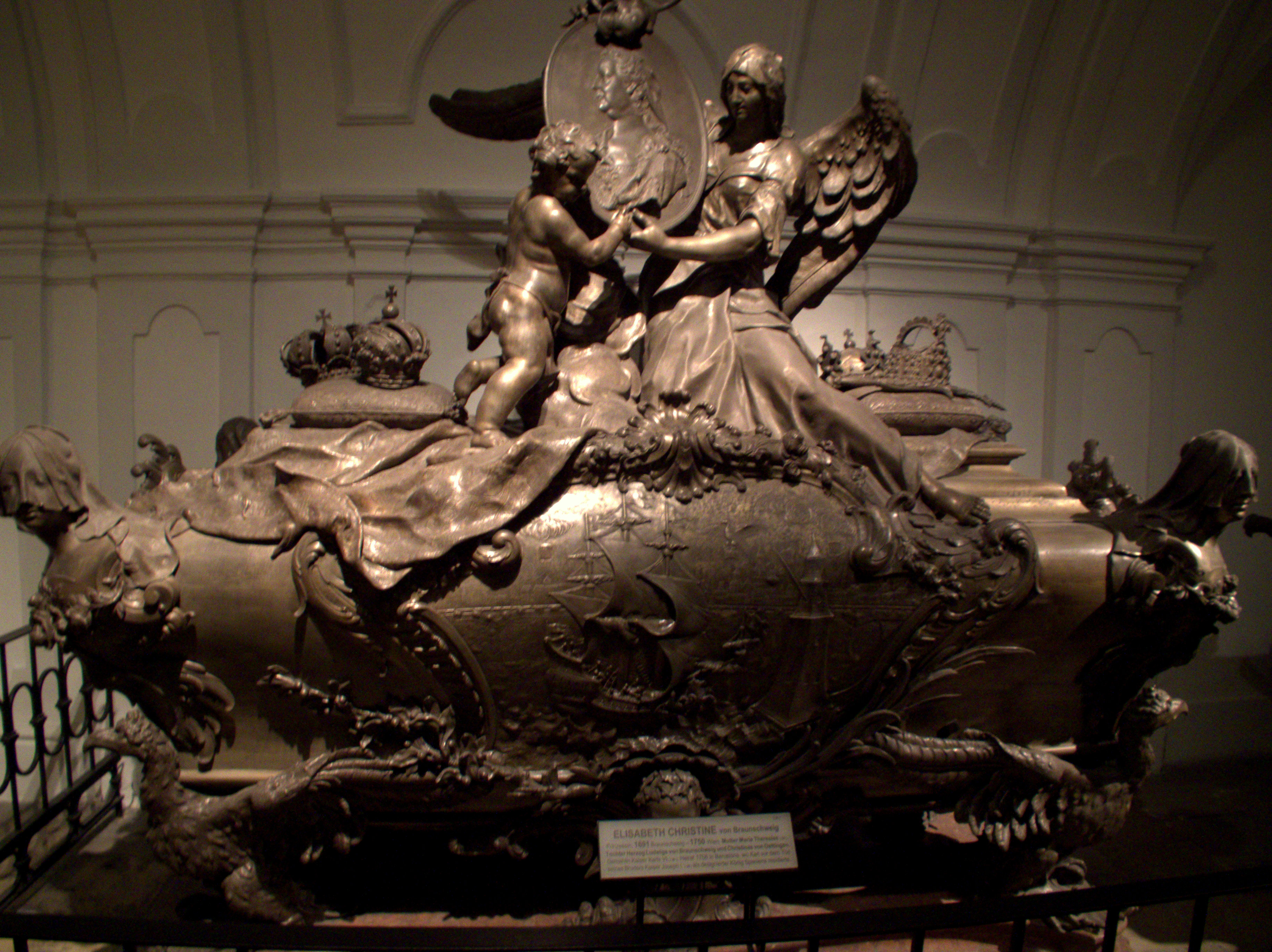
Imperial Crypt

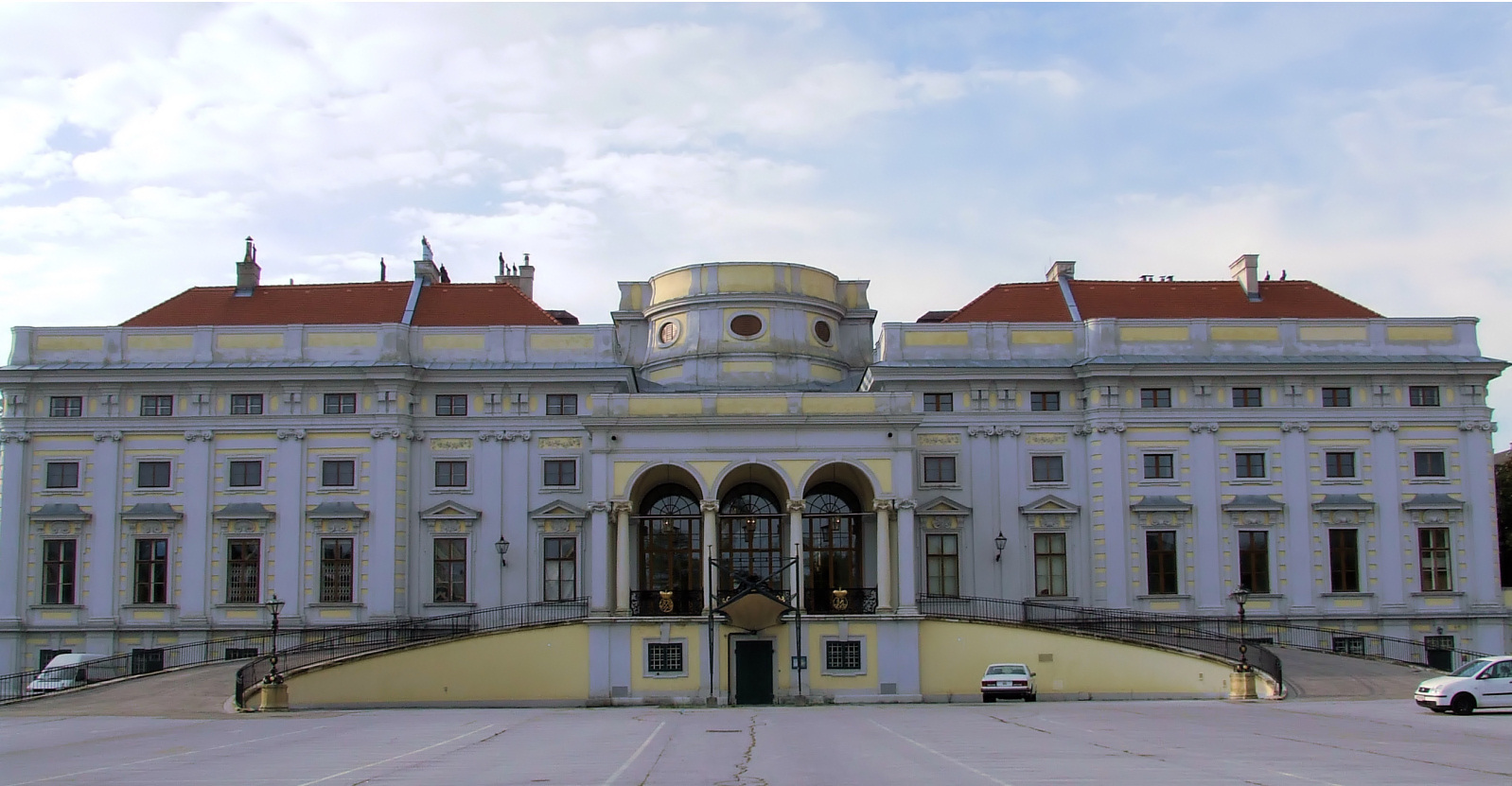
Palais Schwarzenberg

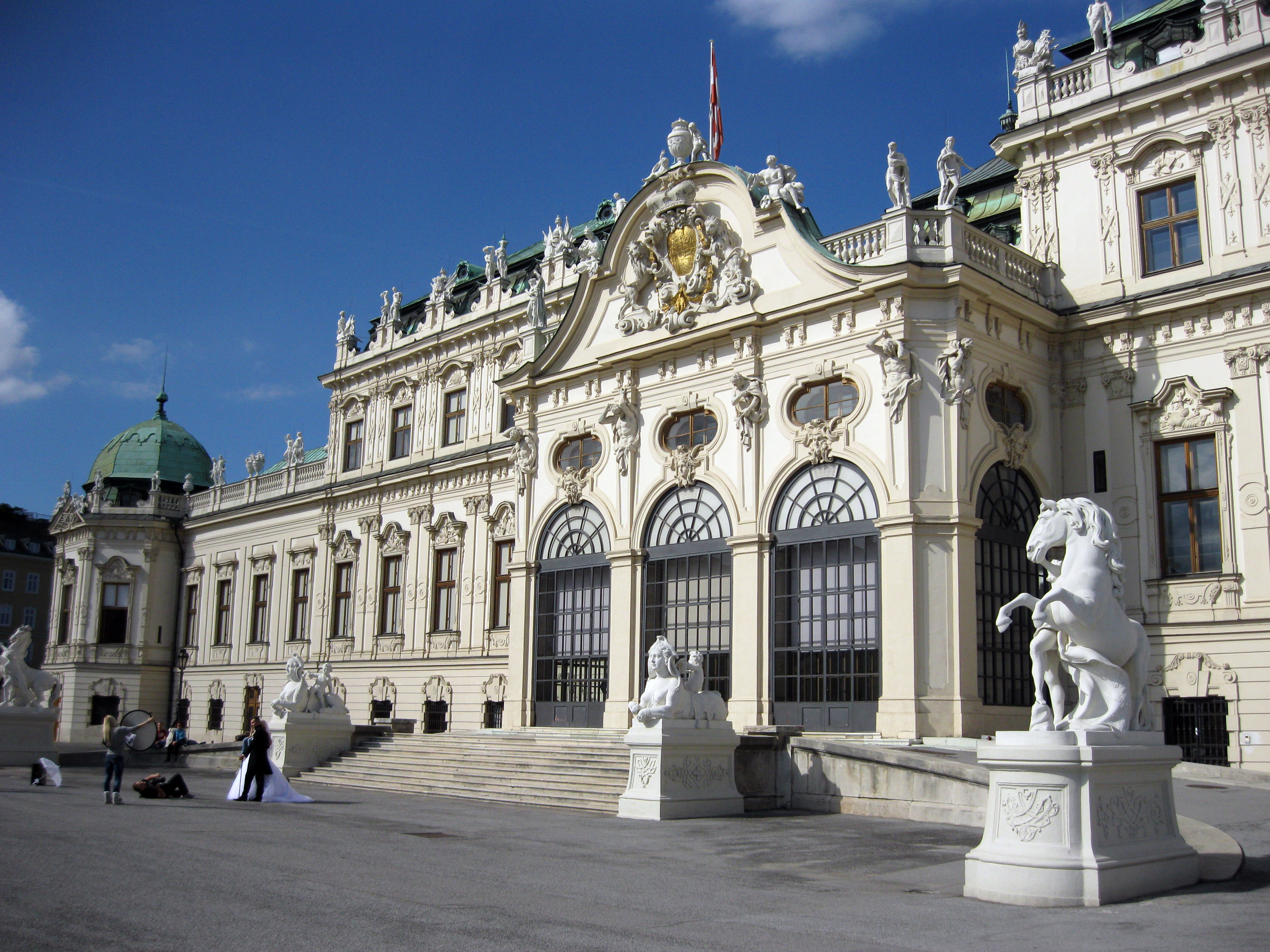
Upper Belvedere façade

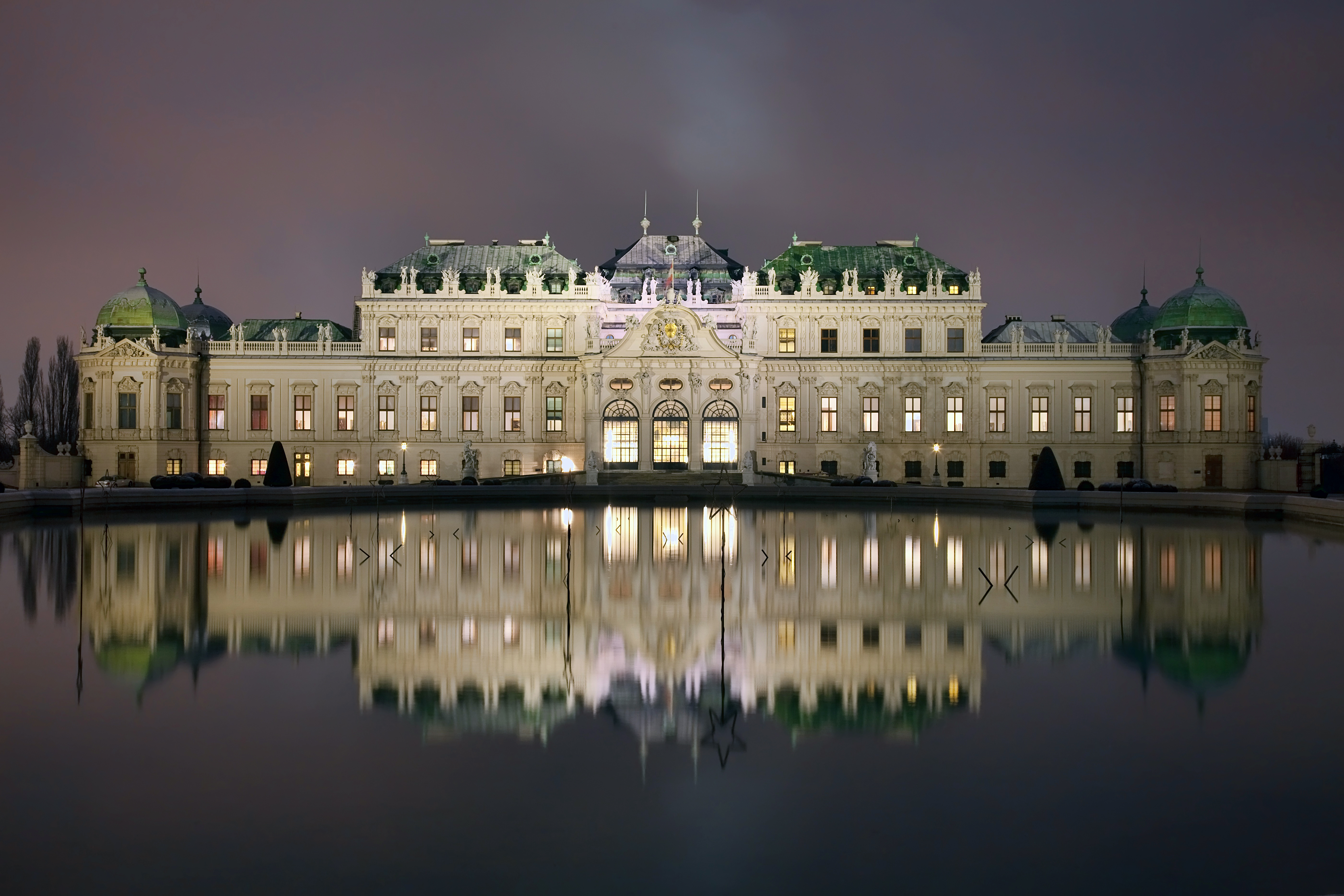
Upper Belvedere at night

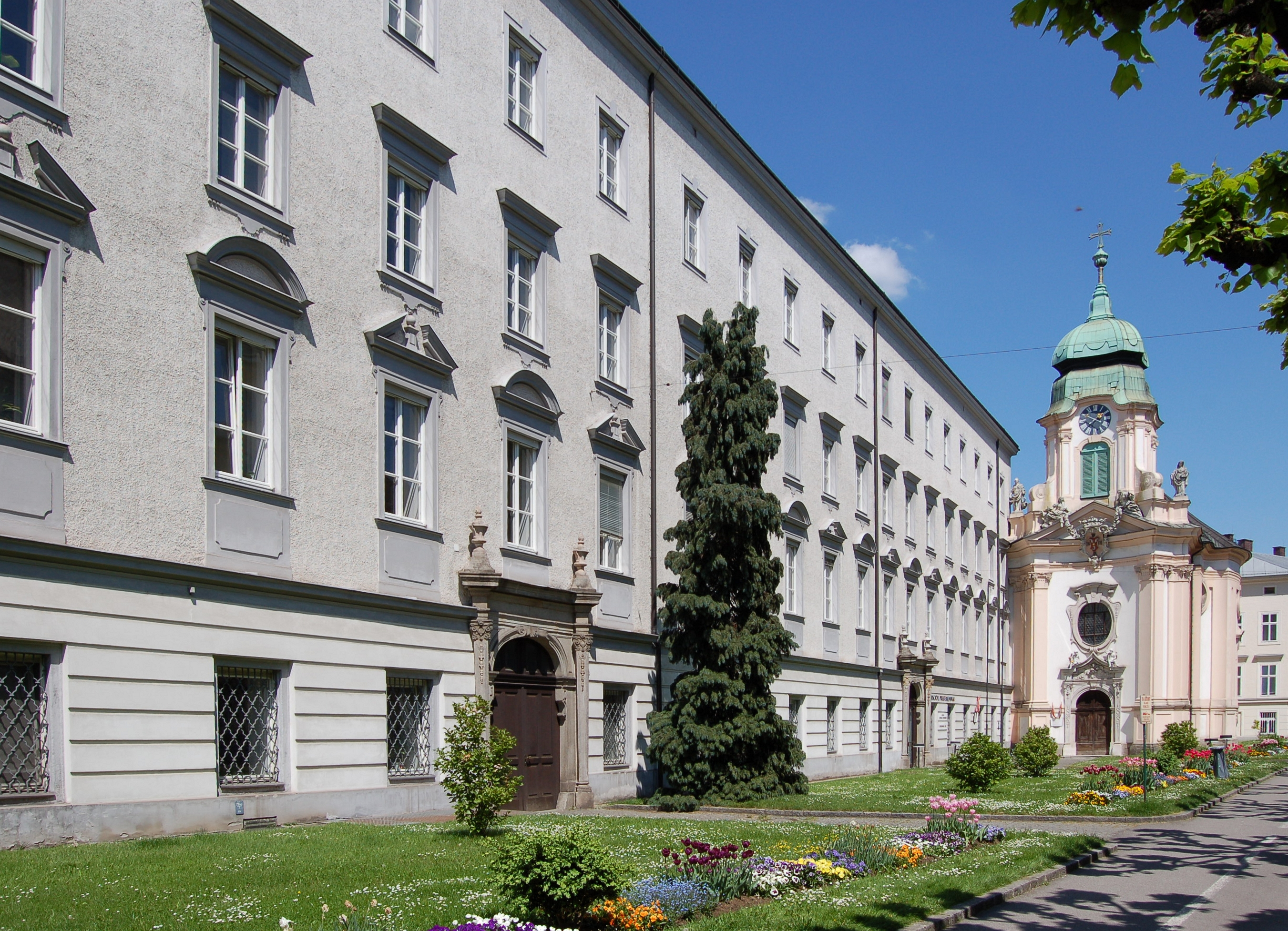
Priesterseminarkirch with Priesterseminar, Linz

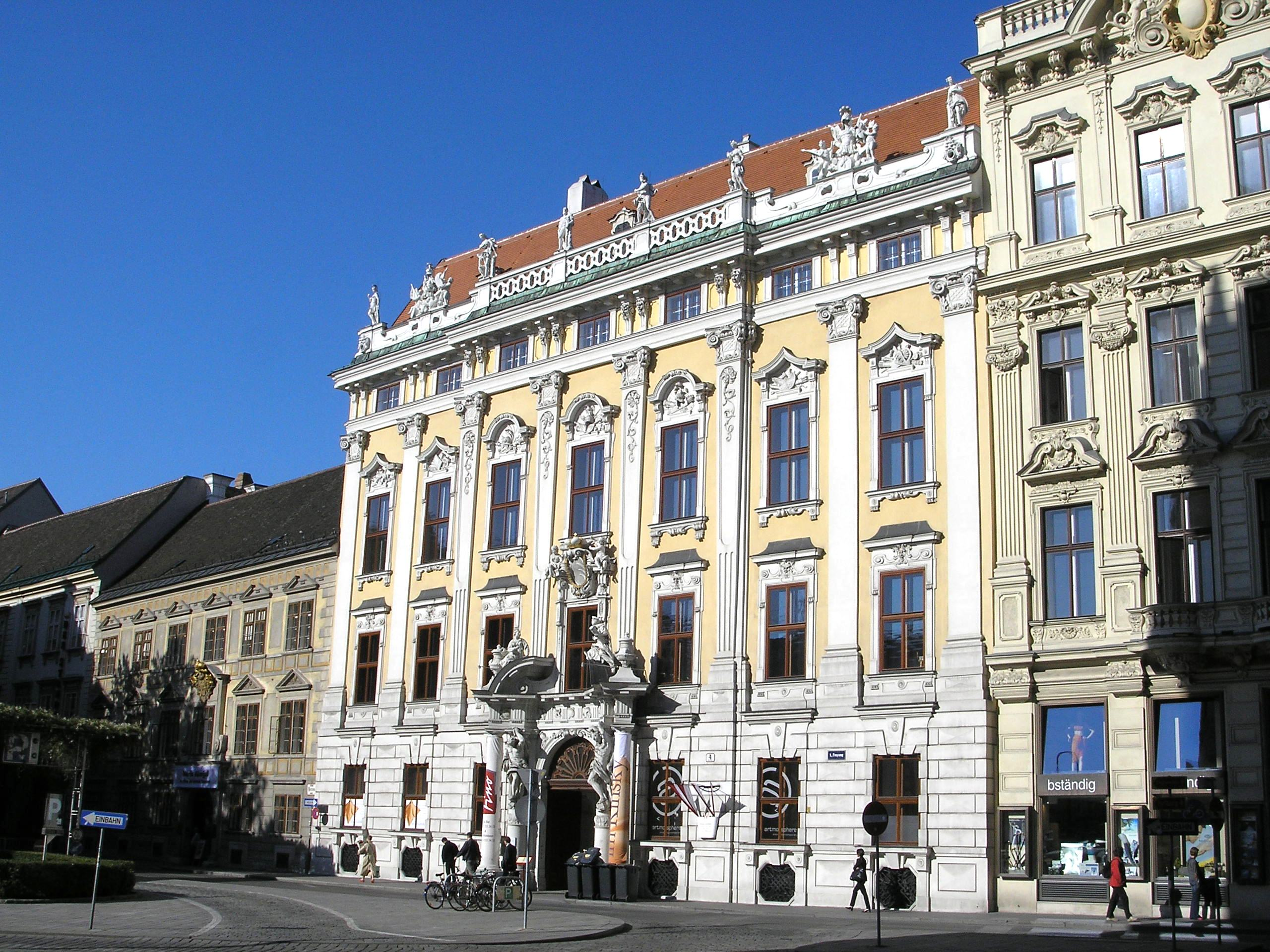
Palais Kinsky

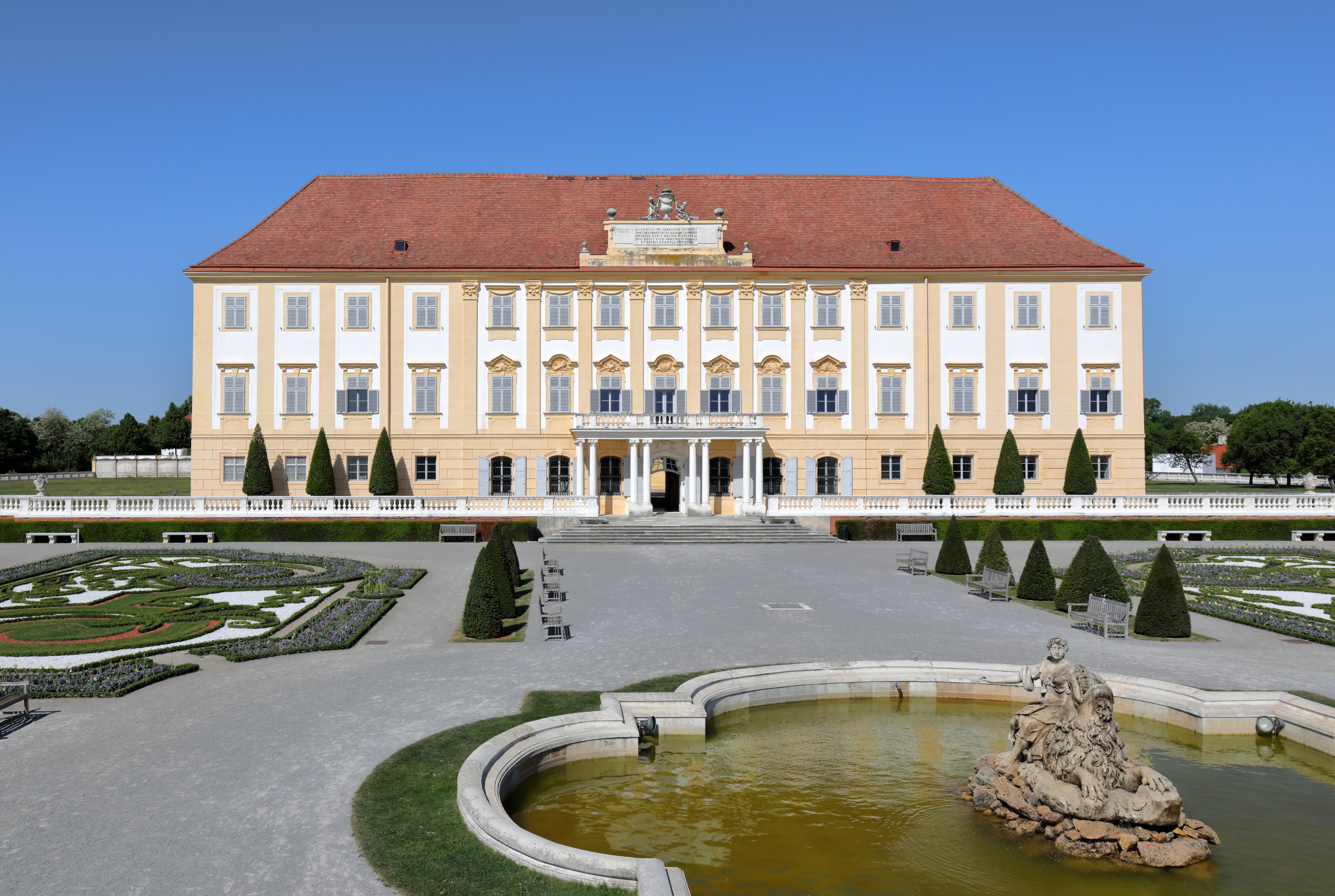
Schloss Hof

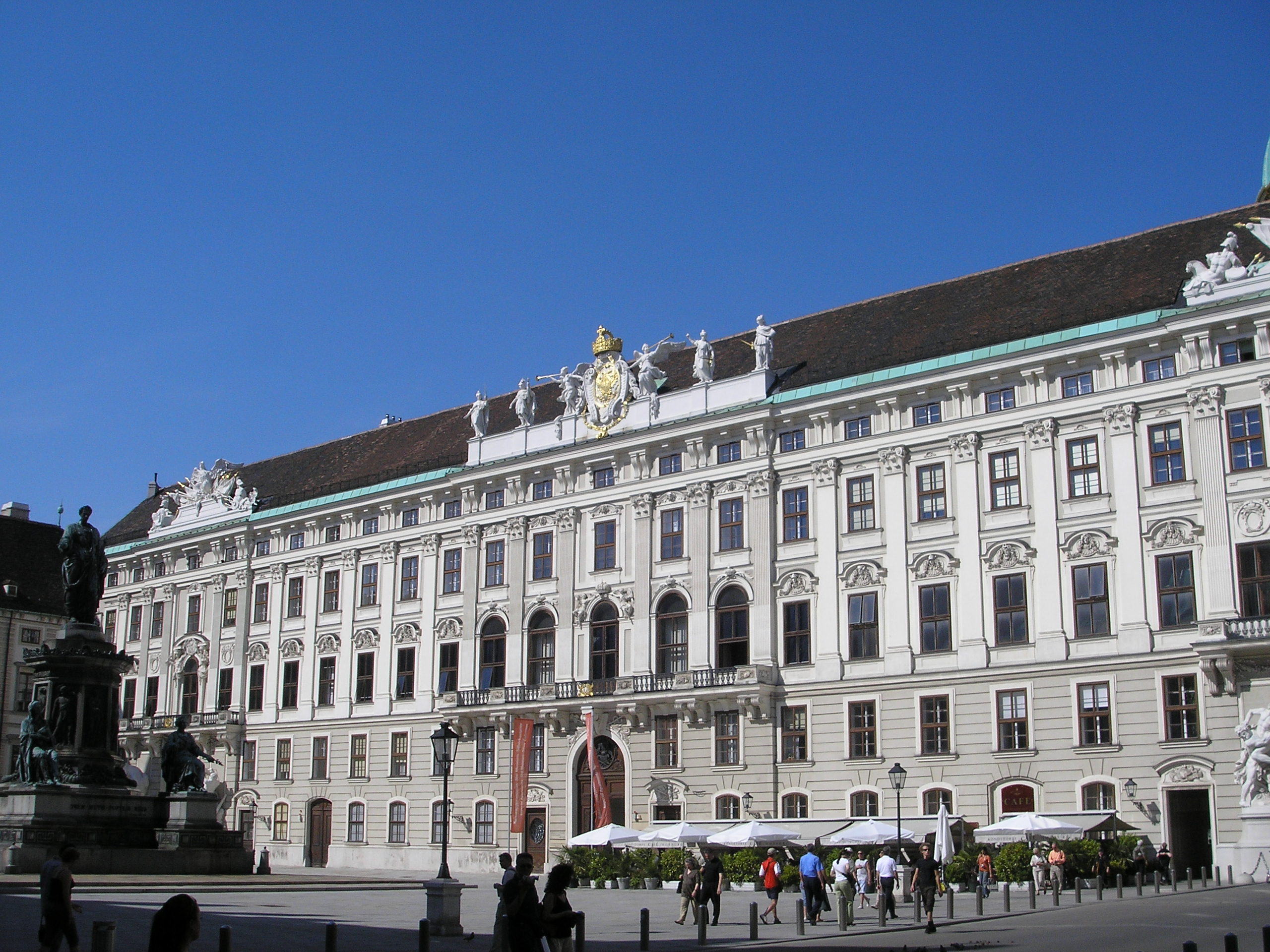
Hofburg Palace, Reichskanzleitrakt

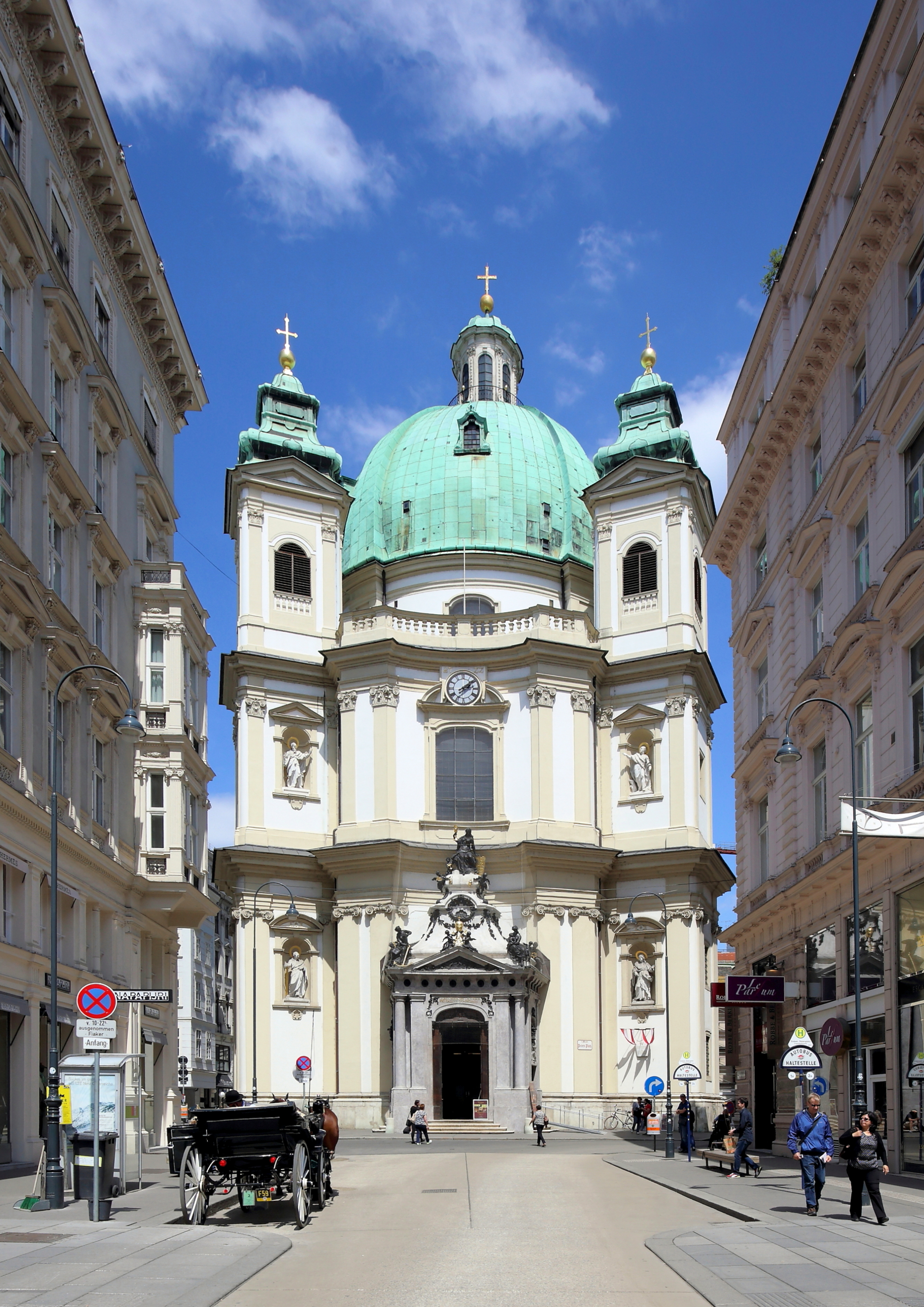
St. Peter's Church

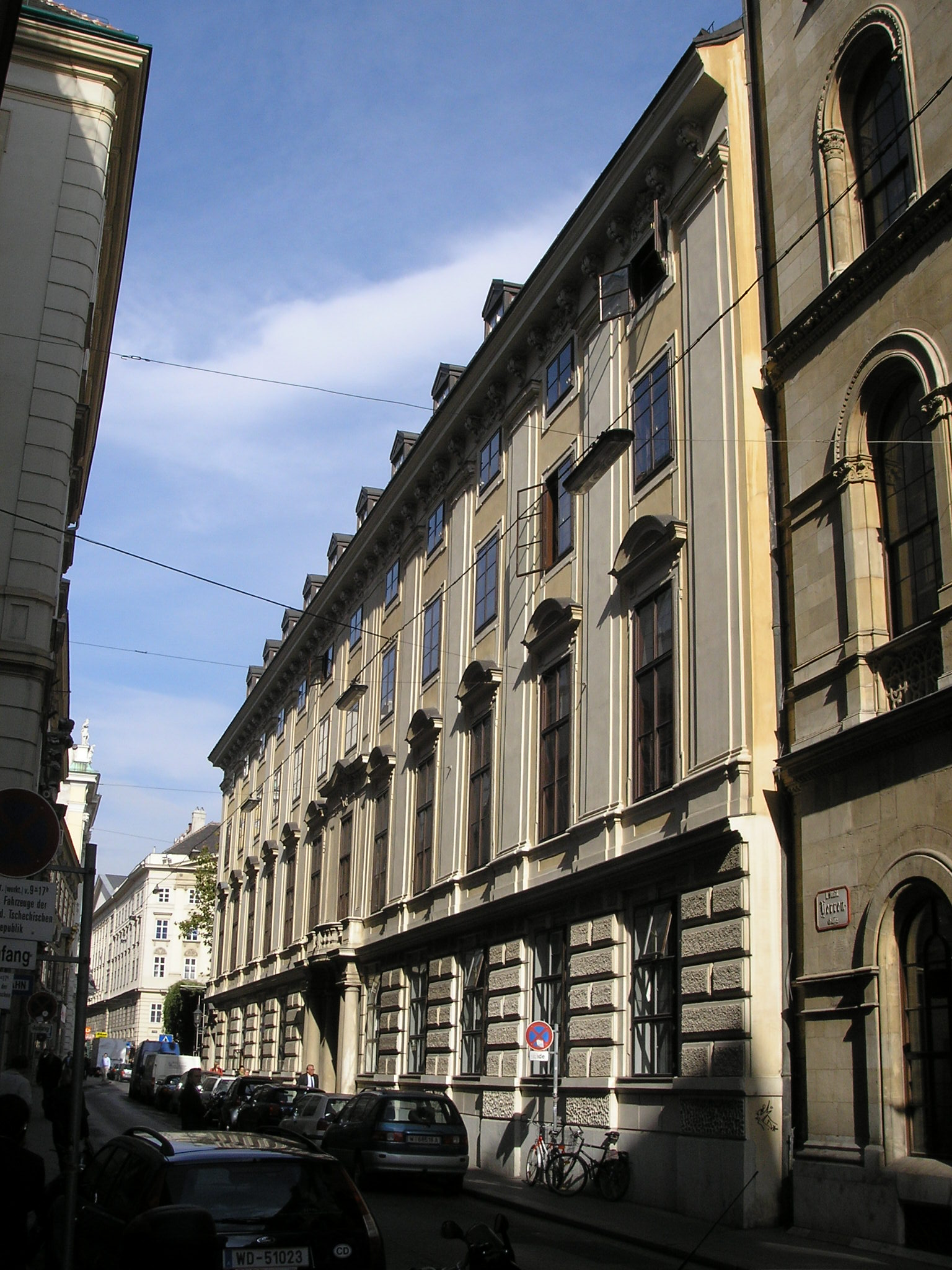
Palais Harrach

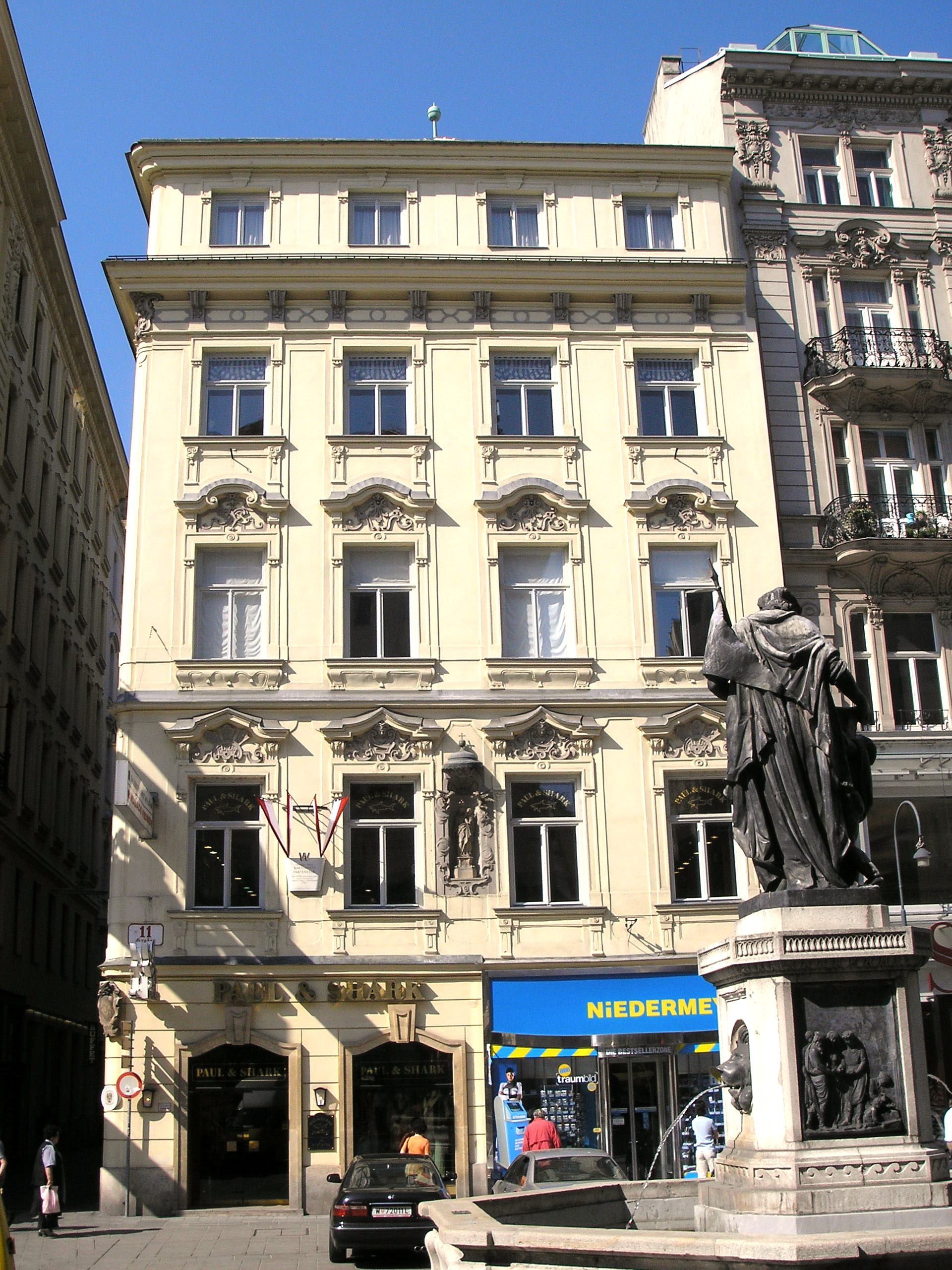
Palais Bartolotti-Partenfeld, Vienna

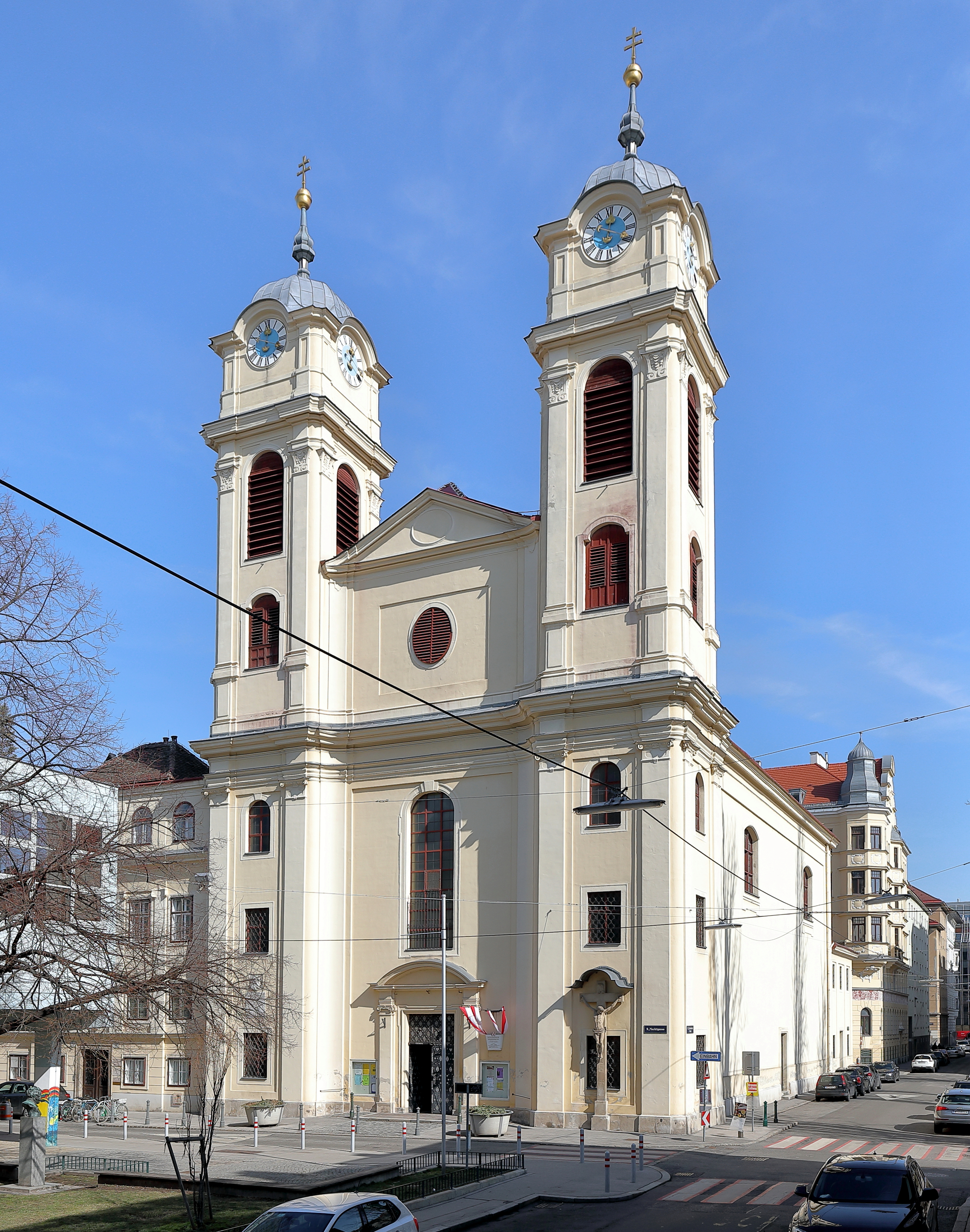
Pfarrkirche Lichtental
