= Palais Schwarzenberg =

Palace in Vienna, Austria

Coordinates: 48°11′49″N 16°22′36″E

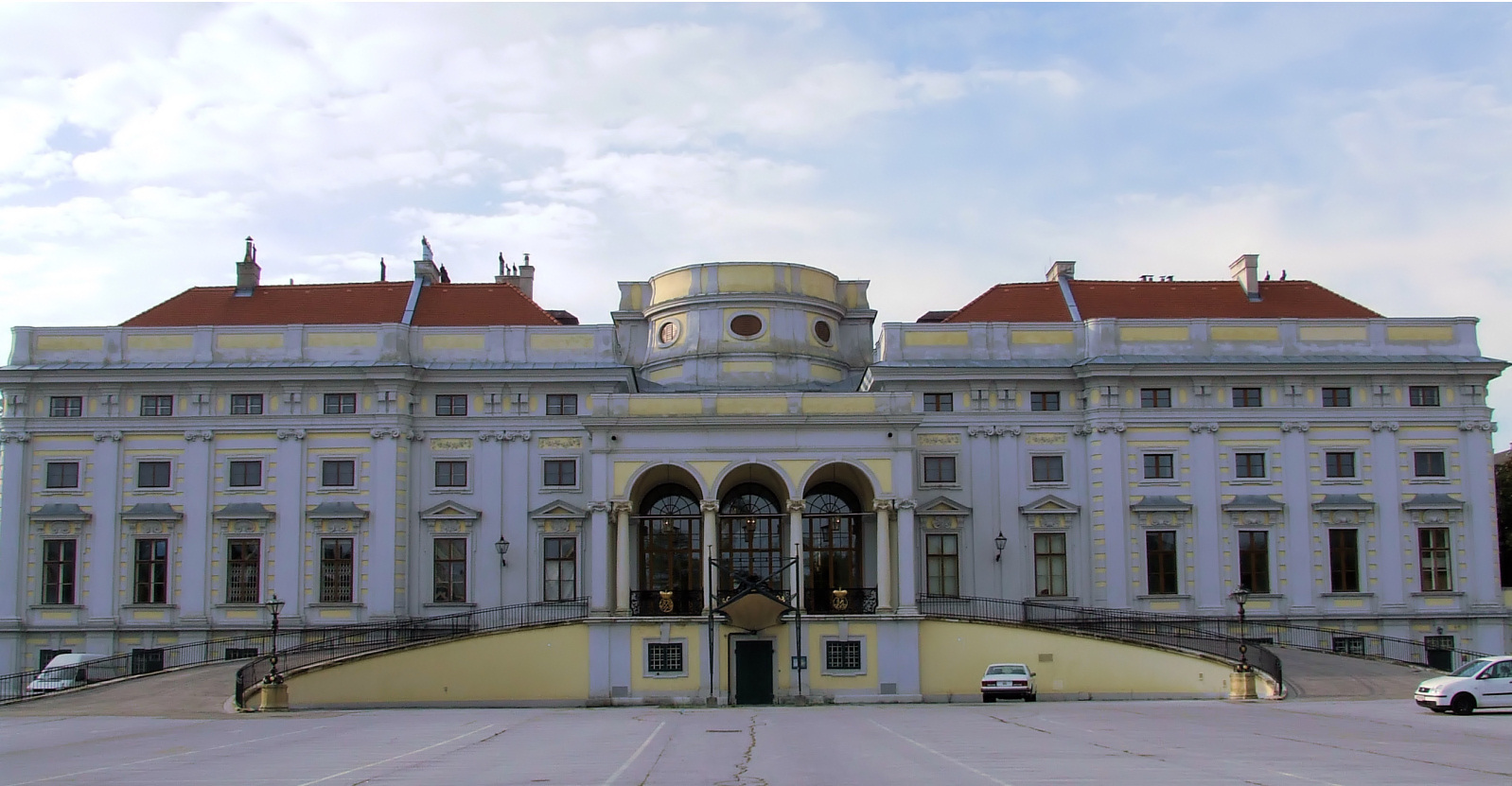
Palais Schwarzenberg

Palais Schwarzenberg is a Baroque palace in front of Schwarzenbergplatz, Landstraße, the 3rd district of Vienna, Austria. It is owned by the princely Schwarzenberg family.

Construction started in 1697 under the architect Johann Lucas von Hildebrandt and finished with alterations in 1728 under Johann Bernhard Fischer von Erlach. Construction was supervised by master builder Anton Erhard Martinelli.

The palace was commissioned by the Obersthofmarschall Heinrich Franz Graf von Mansfeld and Prince von Fondi, but he died while the Palace was being built. The unfinished property was finally bought in 1716 by Prince Adam Franz of Schwarzenberg, who had it completed.

In 1751, a riding school and an orangery were added. The richly decorated Marmorgalerie (marble gallery) is one of the largest features in the palace.

Until 2006, parts of it were a five star hotel, and the building has been used for festivities and events. It doubled as James Bond's hotel in the 1987 movie The Living Daylights. It is currently closed for refurbishment.

A Palais Schwarzenberg in Prague also exists near the cathedral on top of the hill.

== Neighboring sights ==
- Schwarzenbergplatz
- Schwarzenbergstraße
- Lothringerstraße
- Am Heumarkt
- Belvedere
- Rennweg, Prinz-Eugen-Straße, Wieden district
- Russisches-Helden-Denkmal (War Memorial of the Red Army)

== See also ==
- List of Baroque residences
- 18th-century Western domes
