= Eleonore von Schwarzenberg =

German noblewoman (1682–1741)

Princess Eleonore
- Princess of Schwarzenberg
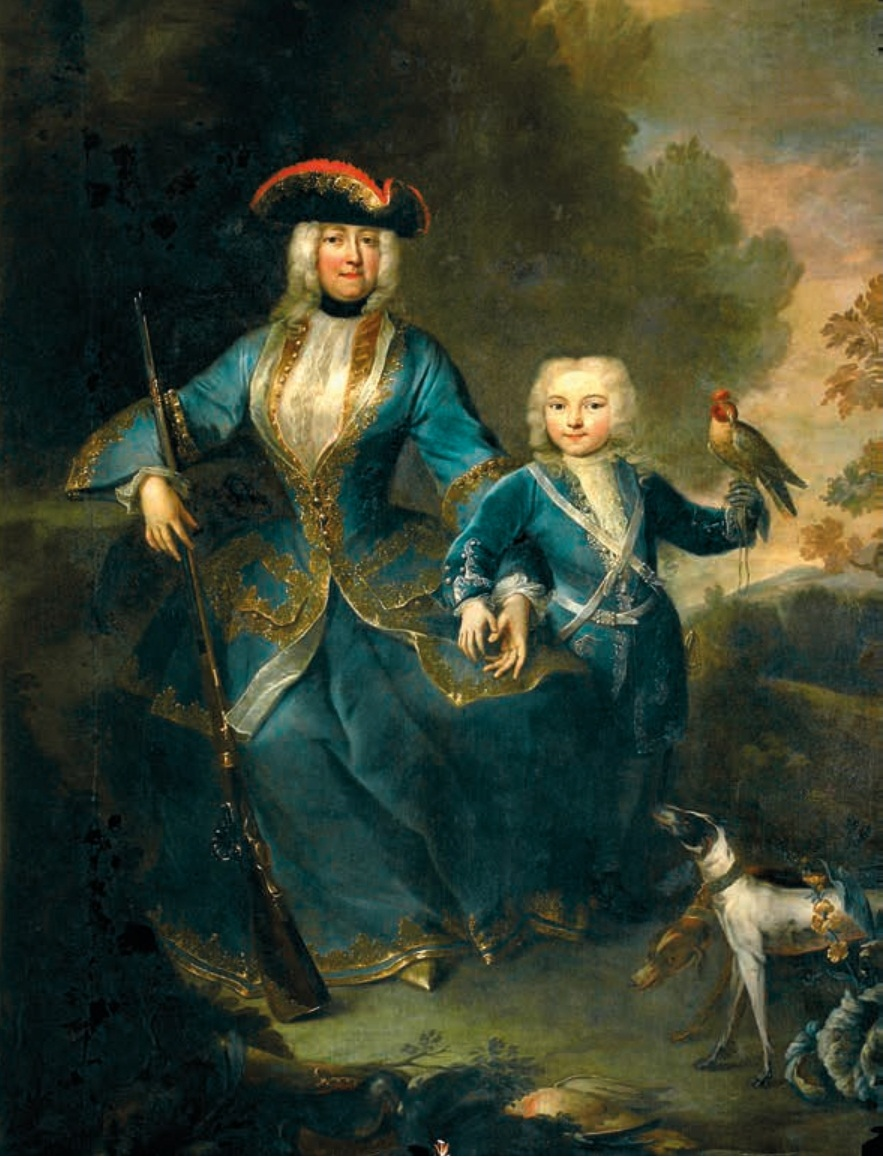
- Princess Eleonore in hunting dress with her son, Joseph
- Born: 20 June 1682; Mělník
- Died: 5 May 1741 (aged 58); Palais Schwarzenberg, Vienna
- Noble family: Lobkowicz (by birth); Schwarzenberg (by marriage)
- Spouse: Adam Franz Karl Eusebius, Prince of Schwarzenberg
- Issue: Maria Anna of Schwarzenberg; Joseph I Adam of Schwarzenberg
- Father: Ferdinand August von Lobkowicz
- Mother: Margravine Maria Anne Wilhelmine of Baden-Baden

Eleonore von Schwarzenberg (Eleonore Elisabeth Amalia Magdalena; 20 June 1682 in Mělník – 5 May 1741 in Palais Schwarzenberg, Vienna) was a member of the Princely House of Lobkowicz by birth, and a Princess of Schwarzenberg by marriage.

== Biography ==
Princess Eleonore Elisabeth Amalia Magdalena of Lobkowicz, was a daughter of Prince Ferdinand August von Lobkowicz, Duke of Sagan (1655–1715), and his second wife, Margravine Maria Anne Wilhelmine of Baden-Baden (1655–1701), daughter of Wilhelm, Margrave of Baden-Baden.

On 6 December 1701 Princess Eleonore married the Austrian Hofmarschall, Adam Franz Karl Eusebius, Hereditary Prince (and later Prince) von Schwarzenberg. Eleonore was considered a cultivated woman, and her and her husband's wealthy and cultured lifestyle was often displayed at court. The marriage produced two children:

- Maria Anna of Schwarzenberg (1706–1755); married Louis George, Margrave of Baden-Baden in 1721.
- Joseph I Adam of Schwarzenberg (1722–1782); married Princess Maria Theresia of Liechtenstein (1721–1753) in 1741.

After 31 years of marriage her husband was killed in a hunting accident on imperial land near Brandýs nad Labem-Stará Boleslav, today in the Czech Republic. Emperor Charles VI fired the deadly shot, and the prince just happened to be in the way. Afterwards, the emperor took Eleonore's son to his court in Vienna, and she was paid a baronial maintenance of 5,000 guldens.

Princess Eleonore died on 5 May 1741 in the Palais Schwarzenberg in Vienna. Franz von Gersdorf, the emperor's physician, requested an autopsy from which the cause of death has been diagnosed as cervical cancer.

== Legacy ==
The 2007 Austrian documentary The Vampire Princess features Eleonore as the supposed inspiration for Gottfried August Bürger's work Lenore (ballad).

Eleonora's dramatic maelstroms are researched and interpreted in the historical novel ‘The Case of Princess Schwarzenberg 1757’ by Martina Grenze.

== Styles ==
- 20 June 1682 – 6 December 1701: Her Serene Highness Princess Eleonore of Lobkowicz
- 6 December 1701 – 1703: Her Serene Highness The Hereditary Princess of Schwarzenberg
- 1703 – 1732: Her Serene Highness The Princess of Schwarzenberg
- 1732 – 5 May 1741: Her Serene Highness The Princess Dowager of Schwarzenberg
