= Ferdinand, Prince of Schwarzenberg =

German-Bohemian nobleman

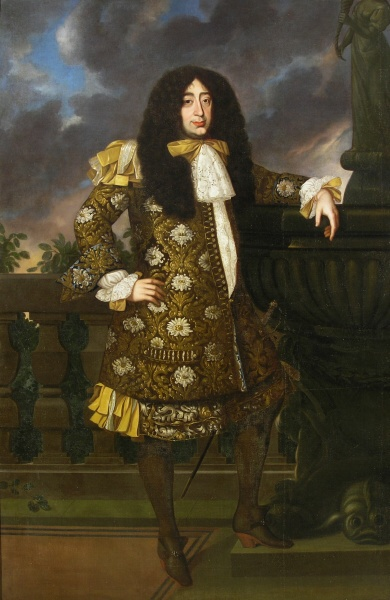
Painting of Ferdinand, 2nd Prince of Schwarzenberg

Ferdinand Wilhelm Eusebius Prince of Schwarzenberg (May 23, 1652, in Brussels – October 22, 1703) was a German-Bohemian nobleman from the Schwarzenberg family.

== Biography ==
Ferdinand was born the son of Count Johann Adolph von Schwarzenberg (raised to the rank of prince in 1670) and his wife, Countess Maria Justina Countess von Starhemberg. Study trips took him to Besançon, Rome and Prague. Due to his father's good relationship with the imperial court, Ferdinand received the office of imperial chamberlain as early as 1668.

In 1679 he acquired the nickname Pestkönig (Plague King) in Vienna, because he was responsible on the one hand for maintaining order during the outbreak of the Great Plague of Vienna, and on the other hand for organizing the care of the sick, contributing from his own financial resources. Even during the Siege of Vienna by the Turks in 1683, Ferdinand took care of the population. In 1685 he was appointed Oberhofmarschall by the Emperor and in 1688 he was accepted into the Order of the Golden Fleece. In 1692 he finally became the Empress's Oberhofmeister.

Despite his many social works, Ferdinand increased the fortune of his house through effective administration. Through his marriage to Maria Anna, heiress of the Counts of Sulz, he won the Landgraviate of Klettgau for his successors, which, in addition to economic advantages, also brought about an improvement in status, since it was an imperial domain.

=== Marriage and offspring ===
Ferdinand married Maria Anna Countess von Sulz in 1674 and had ten children, four of whom died in childhood:

- Adolph Ludwig (1676–1690)
- Adam Franz Karl (1680–1732), 3rd Prince of Schwarzenberg
- Maria Franziska Justina (1677–1737), married Egon Landgrave von Fürstenberg-Stühlingen
- Maria Johanna Nothburga (1688-1757), married Franz Leopold Count von Sternberg
- Maria Elisabeth Luise (1689–1739), married Ferdinand August von Lobkowicz
- Maria Anna Philippine (1692-1744), married Count Franz Karl von Kolowrat-Liebsteinsky
