= Johann Adolf, Prince of Schwarzenberg =

Prince of Schwarzenberg from 1670 to 1683

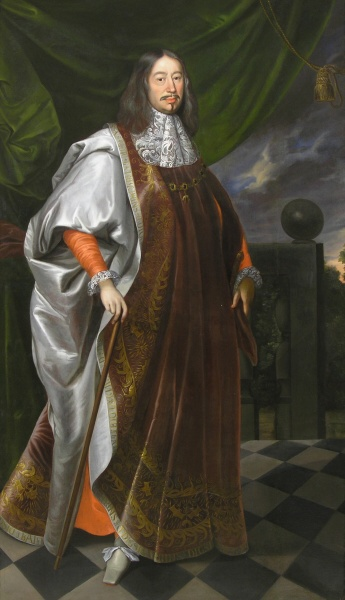
Painting of Johann Adolf, Prince of Schwarzenberg

Johann Adolf of Schwarzenberg (20 September 1615 – 26 May 1683) was the first Prince of Schwarzenberg. A diplomat in the service of the Habsburgs, he was a member of the prestigious House of Schwarzenberg.

== Biography ==
Johann Adolf of Schwarzenberg was born on 20 September 1615 in Wermelskirchen, then part of the Holy Empire. He was the son of Adam, Count of Schwarzenberg and Margareta von Palant.

A shrewd diplomat, he first served in Vienna, before entering the service of Archduke Leopold Wilhelm of Austria, then Governor General of the Spanish Netherlands, of which he became chamberlain. He then lived in Brussels at the court of the Archduke. Johann Adolf was a very cultured and polyglot man, familiar with classical literature and a great patron of art. Over time, he collected a rich collection of works of art, which he passed on to his descendants.
He was highly appreciated by Archduke Leopold Wilhelm of Austria and appointed Knight of the Golden Fleece in 1650.

After the latter's death in 1662, Johann Adolf of Schwarzenberg settled permanently in Bohemia, thus acquiring the domains of Wittingau in 1660 and Frauenberg in 1661.

Johann Adolf was a good manager. He contributed a lot in improving the lands he owned, by for example, introducing new crops or supporting the development of crafts. Devout, he sought to help the poorest by founding, among other things, a refuge for the poor.

On 14 July 1670, Emperor Leopold I made him Prince of Schwarzenberg and President of the Aulic Council.

He died on 26 May 1683 in his sixty-seventh year in Laxenburg, Austria.

=== Marriage and descendants ===
On 15 March 1644, he married in Vienna Marie-Justine de Starhemberg (1608–1681), daughter of Ludwig von Starhemberg (1564-1620).
They had six children:

- Johann Leopold Philipp (January 1647 - August 1647);
- Maria Ernestina (1649–1719), married Fürst Johann Christian von Eggenberg, also a Knight in the Order of the Golden Fleece;
- Ferdinand Wilhelm Eusebius (1652–1703), 2nd Prince of Schwarzenberg;
- Charlotte (1654–1661);
- Louis Adam (1655–1656);
- Polyxena (1658–1659).

== Sources ==
BLKÖ:Schwarzenberg, Johann Adolph Fürst (1615–1683)
