= Adam Franz =

Bohemian nobleman

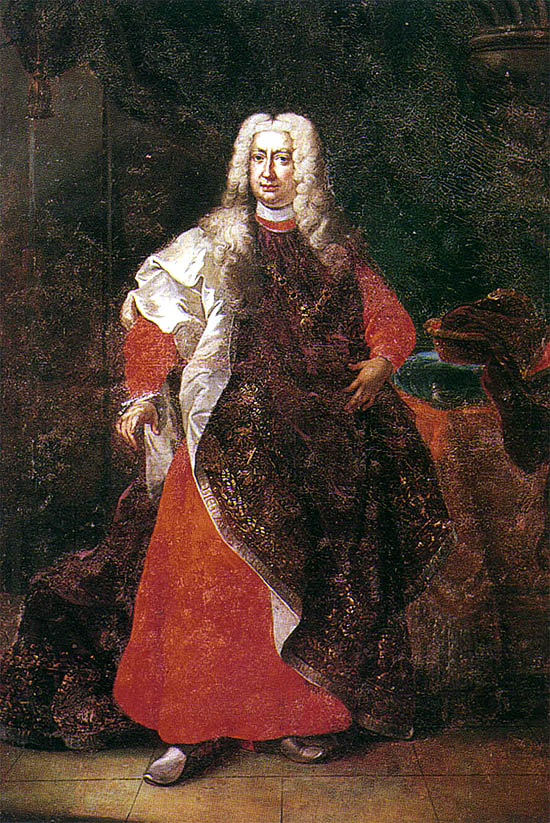
Painting of Adam Franz, 3rd Prince of Schwarzenberg

Adam Franz Prince of Schwarzenberg (25 September 1680, Linz – 11 June 1732, near Brandeis on the Elbe), 3rd Prince of Schwarzenberg, was a Bohemian nobleman from the Schwarzenberg family and Austrian Obersthofmarschall.

== Biography ==
His parents were Ferdinand, 2nd Prince of Schwarzenberg (1652–1703) and Countess Maria Anna von Sulz (1653–1698).

He became the 3rd Prince of Schwarzenberg in 1703. He had the rooms of Tiengen Castle redecorated and also the Protivín castle converted into a baroque building. He acquired the Palais Schwarzenberg in Vienna in 1716.
He became K.K. Chamberlain and Geheimrat, and from 1711 to 1722 he held the office of Obersthofmarschall. From 1722 until his death in 1732 he was Oberststallmeister. He was also awarded with the Order of the Golden Fleece.

Schwarzenberg was made Duke of Krumlov on 28 September 1723.

On 12 June 1732, he was invited by Emperor Charles VI to hunt deer on the imperial estates near Brandeis. He was shot by mistake by the Emperor when the latter aimed his rifle at a deer and Prince Adam Franz got into the line of fire. Prince Adam Franz died the following day from his serious injuries. The deceased was buried on 25 June 1732 in the family crypt in the Augustinian Church in Vienna.

=== Marriage and children ===
He was married to Eleonore Elisabeth Amalia Magdalena von Lobkowicz (1682–1741). They had 2 children.

- Prince Joseph I Adam of Schwarzenberg (15 December 1722 – 17 February 1782), 4th Prince of Schwarzenberg, married on 22 August 1741 in Mariaschein near Teplice with Maria Theresia von und zu Liechtenstein (28 December 1721 – 19 January 1753)
- Maria Anna of Schwarzenberg (25 December 1706 – 12 January 1755) married in 1721 with Margrave Louis George, Margrave of Baden-Baden (1702–1761)

== Ancestry ==
Ancestors of Adam Franz

16. Adolf, 1st Count of Schwarzenberg
8. Adam, 2nd Count of Schwarzenberg
17. Baroness Margaretha Wolff von Metternich
4. Johann Adolf, 1st Prince of Schwarzenberg
18. Hartard von Pallant zu Wiebelskirchen, Lindenberg und Wildenburg
9. Margaret Hartrad von Pallant zu Larochette und Möstroff
19. Magdalena von Reiffenberg
2. Ferdinand Wilhelm, 2nd Prince of Schwarzenberg
20. Rüdiger VII, Baron of Starhemberg
10. Ludwig, Baron of Starhemberg
21. Helene Zäckl von Friedau
5. Baroness Maria Justina von Starhemberg
22. Baron Felician von Herberstein
11. Baroness Barbara von Herberstein
23. Baroness Barbara von Hofkirchen
1. Adam Franz, 3rd Prince of Schwarzenberg
24. Karl Ludwig, Count of Sulz
12. Karl Ludwig Ernst, Count of Sulz-Klettgau
25. Countess Dorothea Katharina von Sayn
6. Johann Ludwig II, Count of Sulz-Klettgau
26. Karl II, Count of Hohenzollern-Sigmaringen
13. Countess Maria Elisabeth of Hohenzollern-Sigmaringen
27. Countess Euphrosyne von Oettingen-Wallerstein
3. Countess Maria Anna von Sulz-Klettgau
28. Johann Georg, Baron of Königsegg
14. Count Johann Georg von Königsegg-Aulendorf
29. Countess Kunigunde von Waldburg zu Wolfegg und Zeil
7. Countess Maria Elisabeth von Königsegg-Aulendorf
30. Count Kaspar von Hohenems
15. Countess Eleonore von Hohenems
31. Eleonore Philippine von Welsperg

== Sources ==
- the article in the German Wikipedia, Adam Franz Karl (Schwarzenberg).
- BLKÖ:Schwarzenberg, Adam Franz Karl Fürst
