= List of consorts of rulers of Baden =

Baden was a state of the Holy Roman Empire and later one of the German states along the frontier with France primarily consisting of territory along the right bank of the Rhine opposite Alsace and the Palatinate.

== Margravine of Baden (incomplete) ==
Picture	Name	Father	Birth	Marriage	Became Margravine	Ceased to be Margravine	Death	Spouse
	Judith of Hohenberg	Berchtold, Count of Hohenberg (Hohenberg)	1083	-	27 April 1112; Title Created	7 October 1121		Herman II
	Bertha of Lorraine	Simon I, Duke of Lorraine (Metz)	1116	before 1134		before 1141 repudiated	1134, 1148, or after 1162	Herman III
	Maria of Bohemia	Soběslav I, Duke of Bohemia (Přemyslids)	1124/25	after 1141		16 January 1160 husband's death	1160	Herman III
	Bertha of Tübingen	Louis, Count Palatine of Tübingen (Tübingen)	1116	around 1162		24 February 1169		Herman IV

== Baden divided ==
=== Margravine of Baden-Baden, 1190–1335 ===
Picture	Name	Father	Birth	Marriage	Became Margravine	Ceased to be Margravine	Death	Spouse
	Irmengard of the Palatinate	Henry V, Count Palatine of the Rhine (Welf)	1200	1217		16 January 1243 husband's death	24 February 1260	Herman V
	Gertrude of Austria	Henry of Austria, Duke of Mödling (Babenberg)	1226	mid 1248		4 October 1250 husband's death	24 April 1288	Herman VI
	Kunigunde of Eberstein	Otto I, Count of Eberstein (Eberstein)	1230	before 20 May 1257		24 April 1288		Rudolph I
	Agnes of Truhendingen	Frederick V, Count of Truhendingen (Truhendingen)	-	before 6 October 1278	19 November 1288 husband's accession	12 July 1291 husband's death	15 March, after 1309	Herman VII
	Adelaide of Ochsenstein	Otto III, Count of Ochsenstein (Ochsenstein)	-	2 May 1285	19 November 1288 husband's accession	15 July 1291 or 14 February 1295 husband's death	17 May 1314	Rudolf II
	Clara of Klingen	Walter, Count of Klingen (Klingen)	-	before 5 January 1278	19 November 1288 husband's accession	before 10 June 1291		Hesso
	Irmengard of Württemberg	Ulrich I, Count of Württemberg (Württemberg)	1261/64	-		before 1295		Hesso
	Adelaide of Rieneck	Gerhard IV, Count of Rieneck (Rieneck)	-	-		14 February 1296/97 husband's death	1299	Hesso
	Jutta of Strassberg	Berchtold II, Count of Strassberg (Strassberg)	-	before March 1306		27 March 1327		Rudolf III
	Joanna of Burgundy, Lady of Héricourt	Reginald of Burgundy, Count of Montbéliard (Ivrea)	-	before 23 February 1326		17 August 1335 husband's death	26 August 1347 or 11 September 1349	Rudolf Hesso

=== Margravine of Baden-Hachberg, 1190–1418 (incomplete) ===
Picture	Name	Father	Birth	Marriage	Became Margravine	Ceased to be Margravine	Death	Spouse
	Irmengard of the Palatinate	Henry V, Count Palatine of the Rhine (Welf)	1200	1217		16 January 1243 husband's death	24 February 1260	Herman V
	Gertrude of Austria	Henry of Austria, Duke of Mödling (Babenberg)	1226	1248		husband's death	24 April 1288	Herman VI

=== Margravine of Baden-Sausenberg, 1290–1503 ===
Picture	Name	Father	Birth	Marriage	Became Margravine	Ceased to be Margravine	Death	Spouse
	Agnes of Rötteln	Otto, Lord of Rötteln (Rötteln)	-	-	1306 husband's accession	before 10 January 1314 husband's death	-	Rudolf I
	Catherine of Thierstein	Walram II, Count of Thierstein (Homberg-Thierstein)	-	before 11 September 1343		5 March/14 November 1353 husband's death	21 March 1385	Rudolf II
	Adelaide of Lichtenberg	Simunt von Lichtenberg, Vogt of Strasbourg (Lichtenberg)	1353	before 2 August 1373		1379		Rudolf III
	Anna of Freiburg	Egino III, Count of Freiburg (Freiburg)	1374	before 11 May 1384		8 February 1428 husband's death	after 25 October 1427	Rudolf III
	Elisabeth of Montfort-Bregenz	William V, Count of Montfort (Montfort)	-	17 August 1422 or 23 February 1424		1441 husband's desposition	4 June 1458	William
	Margaret of Vienne	Guillaume de Vienne, Lord of Saint-Georges (Vienne)	-	3 August 1449		after 1477		Rudolf IV
	Marie of Savoy	Amadeus IX, Duke of Savoy (Savoy)	1459	October 1478	12 April 1487 husband's accession	9 September 1503 husband's death	27 November 1511	Philippe

=== Margravine of Baden-Eberstein, 1291–1353 ===
Picture	Name	Father	Birth	Marriage	Became Margravine	Ceased to be Margravine	Death	Spouse
	Agnes of Weinsberg	Conrad III, Count of Weinsberg (Weinsberg)	-	before 16 October 1312		3 May 1320		Frederick II
	Margaret of Vaihingen	Conrad IV, Count of Vaihingen (Vaihingen)	-	after 26 October 1324		22 June 1333 husband's death	1348	Frederick II
	Matilda of Vaihingen	Conrad VI, Count of Vaihingen (Vaihingen)	-	before 23 June 1341		13 April 1353 husband's death	5 May 1368/24 April 1381	Herman IX

=== Margravine of Baden-Pforzheim, 1291–1361 ===
Picture	Name	Father	Birth	Marriage	Became Margravine	Ceased to be Margravine	Death	Spouse
	Liutgard of Bolanden	Philipp V, Lord of Bolanden (Bolanden)	-	before 28 February 1318		18 March 1324/25		Rudolf IV
	Marie of Oettingen	Frederick I, Count of Oettingen (Oettingen)	-	before 18 February 1326		25 June 1348 husband's death	10 June 1369	Rudolf IV
	Adelaide of Baden-Baden	Rudolf Hesso, Margrave of Baden-Baden (Zähringen)	-	before 26 August 1347	25 June 1348 husband's accession	1361 husband's death	July 1370/31 December 1373	Rudolf V

=== Margravine of Baden-Baden, 1348–1588 ===
Picture	Name	Father	Birth	Marriage	Became Margravine	Ceased to be Margravine	Death	Spouse
	Margaret of Baden-Baden	Rudolf Hesso, Margrave of Baden-Baden (Zähringen)	-	after 26 January 1345	1348 husband's accession	2 September 1353 husband's death	1 September 1367	Frederick III
	Matilda of Sponheim	John III, Count of Sponheim (Sponheim)	-	13 July 1364		21 March 1372 husband's death	1 November 1410	Rudolf VI
	Margarete of Hohenberg	Rudolf III, Count of Hohenberg (Hohenzollern)	-	1 September 1384		1393 divorce	26 February 1419	Bernard I
	Anna of Oettingen	Louis XI, Count of Oettingen (Oettingen)	1380	15 September 1397		5 April 1431 husband's death	9 November 1436/22 July 1442	Bernard I
	Catherine of Lorraine	Charles II, Duke of Lorraine (Ardennes-Metz)	1407	25 July 1422	5 April 1431 husband's accession	1 March 1439		Jacob I
	Catherine of Austria	Ernest, Duke of Austria (Habsburg)	1423	1 July 1447	13 October 1453 husband's accession	24 February 1475 husband's death	11 September 1493	Charles I
	Ottilie of Katzenelnbogen	Philip the Younger of Katzenelnbogen (Katzenelnbogen)	1451	19 December 1468	24 February 1475 husband's accession	19 April 1527 husband's death	15 August 1517	Christopher I
	Françoise de Luxembourg, Countess of Roussy	Charles I, Count of Ligny (Luxembourg)	-	1535		29 June 1536 husband's death	17 June 1566	Bernard III
	Mechthild of Bavaria	William IV, Duke of Bavaria (Wittelsbach)	12 July 1532	17 January 1557		2 November 1565		Philibert

=== Margravine of Baden-Durlach, 1515–1771 ===
Picture	Name	Father	Birth	Marriage	Became Margravine	Ceased to be Margravine	Death	Spouse
	Elisabeth of Brandenburg-Ansbach-Kulmbach	Frederick I, Margrave of Brandenburg-Ansbach (Hohenzollern)	25 March 1494	29 September/7 October 1510	1 August 1515 husband's accession	31 May 1518		Ernest
	Kunigunde of Brandenburg-Kulmbach	Casimir, Margrave of Brandenburg-Bayreuth (Hohenzollern)	17 June 1523	10 March 1551	6 February 1553 husband's accession	27 February 1558		Charles II
	Anna of the Palatinate-Veldenz	Rupert, Count Palatine of Veldenz (Wittelsbach)	12 November 1540	1 August 1558		23 March 1577 husband's death	30 March 1586	Charles II
	Anne of Ostfriesland	Edzard II, Count of East Frisia (Cirksena)	26 June 1562	21 December 1585		14 April 1604 husband's death	21 April 1621	Ernest Frederick
	Juliane Ursula of Salm-Neufville	Frederick, Wildgrave and Rhinegrave Salm-Neufville (Salm-Neufville)	28 September 1572	2 September 1592	14 April 1604 husband's accession	30 April 1614		George Frederick
	Agatha of Erbach	George III, Count of Erbach (Erbach)	16 May 1581	21/23 October 1614		30 April 1621		George Frederick
	Barbara of Württemberg	Frederick I, Duke of Württemberg (Württemberg)	4 December 1593	21 December 1616	22 April 1622 husband's accession	8 May 1627		Frederick V
	Eleonore of Solms-Laubach	Albert Otto I, Count of Solms-Laubach (Solms-Laubach)	9 September 1605	8 October 1627		6 July 1633		Frederick V
	Marie Elisabeth of Waldeck-Eisenberg	Wolrad IV, Count of Waldeck-Eisenberg (Waldeck-Eisenberg)	2 September 1608	21 January 1634		19 February 1643		Frederick V
	Anna Maria of Hohen-Geroldseck	Jacob, Count of Hohen-Geroldseck (Hohengeroldseck)	28 October 1593	13 February 1644		25 May 1649		Frederick V
	Elisabeth Eusebia of Fürstenberg	Christoph II, Count of Fürstenberg (Fürstenberg)	-	20 May 1650		8 September 1659 husband's death	8 June 1676	Frederick V
	Christine Magdalene of the Palatinate-Zweibrücken	John Casimir, Count Palatine of Kleeburg (Wittelsbach)	15 May 1616	30 November 1642	8 September 1659 husband's accession	4 August 1662		Frederick VI
	Auguste Marie of Holstein-Gottorp	Frederick III, Duke of Holstein-Gottorp (Holstein-Gottorp)	6 February 1649	15 May 1670	10 January 1677 husband's accession	25 June 1709 husband's death	25 April 1728	Frederick VII Magnus
	Magdalena Wilhelmine of Württemberg	William Louis, Duke of Württemberg (Württemberg)	7 November 1677	27 June 1697	25 June 1709 husband's accession	12 May 1738 husband's death	30 October 1742	Charles III William
	Caroline Louise of Hesse-Darmstadt	Louis VIII, Landgrave of Hesse-Darmstadt (Hesse-Darmstadt)	11 July 1723	28 January 1751		21 October 1771; Unification of Baden	8 April 1783	Charles Frederick

=== Margravine of Baden-Sponheim, 1515–1533 ===
Picture	Name	Father	Birth	Marriage	Became Margravine	Ceased to be Margravine	Death	Spouse
	Elisabeth of the Palatinate	Philip, Elector Palatine (Wittelsbach)	16 November 1483	3 January 1503	1515 husband's accession	24 June 1522		Philip I

=== Margravine of Baden-Rodemachern, 1536–1596 ===
Picture	Name	Father	Birth	Marriage	Became Margravine	Ceased to be Margravine	Death	Spouse
	Cecilia of Sweden	Gustav I of Sweden (Vasa)	16 November 1540	18 June 1564		2 August 1575 husband's death	27 January 1627	Christopher II
	Maria van Eicken	Joost van Eycken, Governor of Breda (Eicken)	1571	13 March 1591		16 January 1243 husband's death	21 April 1636	Edward Fortunatus

=== Margravine of Baden-Hachberg, 1577–1591 ===
Picture	Name	Father	Birth	Marriage	Became Margravine	Ceased to be Margravine	Death	Spouse
	Elisabeth of Culemborg-Pallandt	Count Floris I of Culemborg-Pallandt (Culemborg-Pallandt)	1567	6 September 1584		17 August 1590 husband's death	8 May 1620	James III

=== Margravine of Baden-Sausenberg, 1577–1604 ===
Picture	Name	Father	Birth	Marriage	Became Margravine	Ceased to be Margravine	Death	Spouse
	Juliane Ursula of Salm-Neufville	Frederick, Wildgrave and Rhinegrave Salm-Neufville (Salm-Neufville)	28 September 1572	2 September 1592		14 April 1604; Became Margravine of Baden-Durlach	30 April 1614	George Frederick

=== Margravine of Baden-Rodemachern, 1622–1666 ===
Picture	Name	Father	Birth	Marriage	Became Margravine	Ceased to be Margravine	Death	Spouse
	Antonia Elisabeth of Kriechingen	Christoph, Count of Kriechingen (Kriechingen)	1598	18 April 1627		12 January 1635		Herman Fortunatus
	Marie Sidonie of Falkenstein	Philipp Franz, Count of Falkenstein (Falkenstein)	1605	1636		4 January 1665 husband's death	1675	Herman Fortunatus

=== Margravine of Baden-Baden, 1622–1771 ===
Picture	Name	Father	Birth	Marriage	Became Margravine	Ceased to be Margravine	Death	Spouse
	Catharina Ursula of Hohenzollern–Hechingen	Johann Georg, Prince of Hohenzollern-Hechingen (Hohenzollern–Hechingen)	1610	13 October 1624		2 June 1640		William
	Maria Magdalena of Oettingen-Baldern	Ernst I, Count of Oettingen-Baldern (Oettingen-Baldern)	1619	1650		22 May 1677 husband's death	31 August 1688	William
	Sibylle of Saxe-Lauenburg	Julius Francis, Duke of Saxe-Lauenburg (Ascania)	21 January 1675	27 March 1690		4 January 1707 husband's death	10 July 1733	Louis William
	Maria Anna of Schwarzenberg	Adam Franz, Prince of Schwarzenberg (Schwarzenberg)	25 December 1706	18 March 1721		12 January 1755		Louis George
	Maria Anna Josepha of Bavaria	Charles VII, Holy Roman Emperor (Wittelsbach)	7 August 1734	20 July 1755		22 October 1761 husband's death	7 May 1776	Louis George
	Marie Victoire d'Arenberg	Léopold Philippe, Duke of Arenberg (Arenberg)	26 October 1714	7 December 1735	22 October 1761 husband's accession	21 October 1771 husband's death	13 April 1793	Augustus George

== Margravine of Baden ==
Picture	Name	Father	Birth	Marriage	Became Margravine	Ceased to be Margravine	Death	Spouse
	Caroline Louise of Hesse-Darmstadt	Louis VIII, Landgrave of Hesse-Darmstadt (Hesse-Darmstadt)	11 July 1723	28 January 1751	21 October 1771; Unification of Baden	8 April 1783		Charles Frederick

== Electress of Baden ==
None

== Grand Duchess of Baden ==
Picture	Name	Father	Birth	Marriage	Became Grand Duchess	Ceased to be Grand Duchess	Death	Spouse
	Stéphanie de Beauharnais	Claude de Beauharnais, 2nd Count des Roches-Baritaud (Beauharnais)	28 August 1789	8 April 1806	10 June 1811 husband's accession	8 December 1818 husband's death	29 January 1860	Charles
	Sophie of Sweden	Gustav IV Adolf of Sweden (Holstein-Gottorp)	21 May 1801	25 July 1819	30 March 1830 husband's accession	24 April 1852 husband's death	6 July 1865	Leopold
	Louise of Prussia	Wilhelm I, German Emperor (Hohenzollern)	3 December 1838	20 September 1856		28 September 1907 husband's death	23 April 1923	Frederick I
	Hilda of Nassau	Adolphe, Grand Duke of Luxembourg (Nassau-Weilburg)	5 November 1864	20 September 1885	28 September 1907 husband's accession	22 November 1918 husband's abdication	8 February 1952	Frederick II

== See also ==
- List of monarchs of Baden
