= Augustus George, Margrave of Baden-Baden =

Augustus George
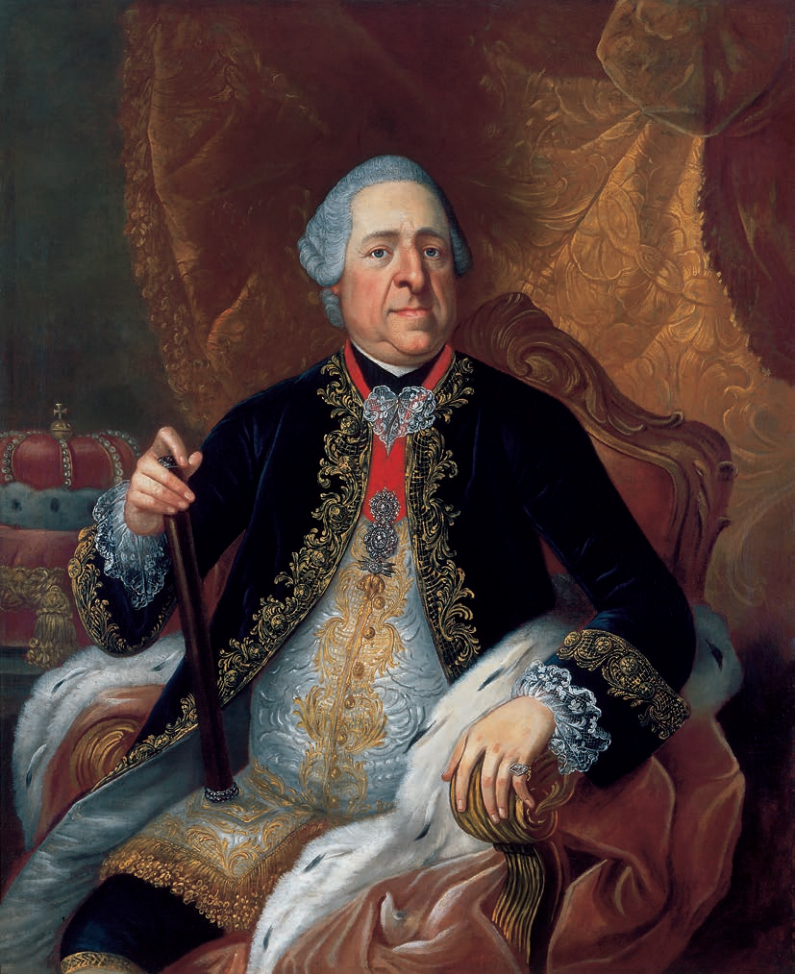
- Portrait, c. 1760

Margrave of Baden-Baden
- Reign: 22 October 1761 – 21 October 1771
- Predecessor: Louis George
- Successor: Charles Frederick
- Born: 14 January 1706; Schloss Rastatt, Margraviate of Baden, Holy Roman Empire
- Died: 21 October 1771 (aged 65); Schloss Rastatt, Margraviate of Baden, Holy Roman Empire
- Burial: Stiftskirche, Baden-Baden
- Spouse: Marie Victoire d'Arenberg (m. 1735)
- House: Zähringen
- Father: Louis William of Baden-Baden
- Mother: Sibylle of Saxe-Lauenburg
- Religion: Roman Catholicism

Augustus George, Margrave of Baden-Baden (August Georg Simpert; 14 January 1706 – 21 October 1771) was the ruling Margrave of Baden-Baden from 1761 till his death in 1771. He succeeded his brother Louis George and was the brother of the Duchess of Orléans. He was the son-in-law of Duke Léopold Philippe d'Arenberg.

== Biography ==
Born at the Schloss Rastatt, he was the youngest son of Louis William, Margrave of Baden-Baden, a distinguished member of the Imperial Army and his wife Sibylle of Saxe-Lauenburg, sister of the future Grand Duchess of Tuscany

In 1707 his father died and his older brother Louis George, Hereditary prince of Baden-Baden succeeded as the ruler of the state with a regency held by his mother. During his mother's regency, it was decided that he would enter the church. As such, at the age of 20, he took religious vows and was later a canon of Cologne in 1726 and 1728 dean at Augsburg.

In 1727, his brother gained his majority, and his mother left the administration of the state to him. His mother died in 1733 after she had been a popular ruler.

In 1735, he left the church, and married Princess Maria Viktoria von Arenberg, a daughter of Duke Léopold Philippe d'Arenberg and his wife Duchess Maria Lodovica Francesca Pignatelli of Bisaccia. Her brother was Duke Charles Marie Raymond, a member of the Imperial Army like Augustus George's own father. The couple married 7 December 1735 at the Schloss Rastatt.

At the death of his brother in 1761 aged 59, Augustus George succeeded him, as Louis George had had no male issue, and Salic law was applicable in Baden-Baden. Since he was childless himself (even though there is evidence that he had at least one daughter), it became evident that the state would have to pass to the Baden-Durlach line of the House of Zähringen, which was then headed by his distant cousin Charles Frederick, Margrave of Baden-Durlach.

At his death in 1771 he was succeeded by Charles Frederick and the Catholic rulers of Baden-Baden ended with him uniting the Protestant Baden-Durlach with the Catholic Baden-Baden, thus allowing free religion. The contract detailing the Baden-Durlach inheritance was signed in 1765, six years before Augustus George died.

He died at the Schloss Rastatt at 65.

During the reign of August Georg, a school order, a fire insurance fund was introduced and a widow. He also set up in honour of his father, the Turks Louis, the "Tuerckische chamber in the castle of Rastatt, where the Ottoman spoils were kept.

While Augustus George has been described as childless by some accounts, it is extremely reasonable that he had at least one daughter, if not more children. This daughter, Mary Bowman, had been arranged to marry a wealthy duke but had instead run off to the United States with her father's steward, John Croft/Krafft. She was born sometime between the years of ~1737-1731, and died in the early 19th century in Stillwater, Saratoga.

His wife outlived him until 1793. He was buried at the Stiftskirche in Baden-Baden beside his wife.

== Ancestors ==
Ancestors of Augustus George, Margrave of Baden-Baden

16. Eduard Fortunatus, Margrave of Baden
8. William, Margrave of Baden-Baden
17. Maria of Eicken
4. Ferdinand Maximilian, Hereditary Prince of Baden-Baden
18. John George, Prince of Hohenzollern-Hechingen
9. Catherine Ursula of Hohenzollern–Hechingen
19. Franziska of Salm-Neufville
2. Louis William, Margrave of Baden-Baden
20. Charles Emmanuel I, Duke of Savoy
10. Thomas Francis, Prince of Carignano
21. Infanta Catherine Michelle of Spain
5. Princess Louise of Savoy, Hereditary Princess of Baden-Baden
22. Charles de Bourbon, Count of Soissons
11. Marie de Bourbon, Countess of Soissons
23. Anne de Montafié
1. Augustus George Simpert of Baden-Baden
24. Francis II of Saxe-Lauenburg
12. Julius Henry of Saxe-Lauenburg
25. Maria of Brunswick-Lüneburg
6. Duke Julius Francis of Saxe-Lauenburg
26. Wilhelm Lobkowicz, Lord of Bilin
13. Anna Magdalene, Lady of Lobkowicz
27. Benigna Katharina Lobkowicz
3. Sibylle of Saxe-Lauenburg
28. Augustus, Count Palatine of Sulzbach
14. Christian Augustus, Count Palatine of Sulzbach
29. Hedwig of Schleswig-Holstein-Gottorp
7. Hedwig of the Palatinate-Sulzbach
30. John VII, Count of Nassau-Siegen
15. Amalie of Nassau-Siegen
31. Margaret of Schleswig-Holstein-Sonderburg

Augustus George, Margrave of Baden-Baden House of Zähringen Born: 14 January 1706 Died: 21 October 1771
Preceded by Louis George	Margrave of Baden-Baden; 1761-1771	Succeeded by Charles Frederick as Margrave of Baden
