= Maria Magdalena of Oettingen-Baldern =

German noblewoman

- Born: 1619
- Died: 31 August 1688; Baden-Baden
- Noble family: House of Oettingen-Wallerstein
- Spouse: William, Margrave of Baden-Baden
- Father: Ernest I, Count of Oettingen-Baldern
- Mother: Catherine of Helfenstein-Wiesensteig

Countess Maria Magdalena of Oettingen-Baldern (1619 – 31 August 1688 in Baden-Baden) was the second wife of the Margrave William of Baden-Baden.

== Early life ==
Mary Magdalene was a daughter of Count Ernst I von Oettingen-Baldern (1584–1626) and his wife Countess Katharina von Helfenstein-Wiesensteig (1589–1638).

== Personal life ==
She married Margrave William of Baden-Baden as his second wife. They were the parents of:

- Philip Francis William (1652–1655), who died young.
- Anna Maria Wilhelmina (1655–1702), who married with Prince Ferdinand August von Lobkowicz (1655–1715) in 1680.
- Charles Bernard (1657–1678), who died in the Battle of Rheinfelden during the Franco-Dutch War.
- Eva
- Maria

Countess Maria Magdalena of Oettingen-Baldern was the teacher of her step-grandson, the future Margrave Louis William of Baden-Baden after his mother did not want to live with her husband at the court in Baden-Baden and moved to Paris. Her husband, Maria Magdalena's step-son, Hereditary Prince Ferdinand Maximilian then had his 3-months-old son kidnapped from Paris back to Baden-Baden and asked Maria Magdalena to educate him.

Vacant Title last held by Catherine Ursula of Hohenzollern-Hechingen	Margravine consort of Baden-Baden; 1655–1677	Vacant Title next held by Duchess Sibylle of Saxe-Lauenburg
