= Charles William, Margrave of Baden-Rodemachern =

- Born: 1627
- Died: 1666 (aged 38–39)
- Noble family: House of Zähringen
- Father: Herman Fortunatus, Margrave of Baden-Rodemachern
- Mother: Antonia Elizabeth of Criechingen

Margrave Charles William Eugene of Baden-Rodemachern (1627–1666), was Margrave of Baden-Rodemachern and canon in Cologne. He was a son of Margrave Herman Fortunatus from his first marriage with Antonia Elizabeth (d. 12 January 1635), a daughter of Christopher of Criechingen.

He was chamberlain to King Ferdinand IV and canon of the cathedral chapter in Cologne. With his death, the younger line of Baden-Rodemachern died out and Baden-Rodemachern fell back to Baden-Baden — although Rodemachern itself was occupied by France at the time.

== Ancestors ==
Ancestors of Charles William, Margrave of Baden-Rodemachern

16. Bernhard III, Margrave of Baden-Baden
8. Christopher II, Margrave of Baden-Rodemachern
17. Françoise of Ligny
4. Edward Fortunatus
18. Gustav I of Sweden
9. Princess Cecilia of Sweden
19. Margareta Leijonhufvud
2. Herman Fortunatus, Margrave of Baden-Rodemachern
20. Jan of Eicken
10. Joost of Eicken
21. Barbara of Offhusen
5. Maria of Eicken
22. Martin of Moll
11. Barbara of Moll
23. Anna of Olmen
1. Charles William, Margrave of Baden-Rodemachern
24. John V, Baron of Criechingen
12. Wirich, Baron of Criechingen
25. Irmgard of Raville
6. Christopher, Count of Criechingen-Pittingen
26. John VII, Wild- and Rhinegrave of Salm-Kyrburg
13. Antonia of Salm-Kyrburg
27. Anna of Isenburg-Büdingen-Kelsterbach
3. Antonia Elizabeth of Criechingen
28. George, Baron Bayer of Boppard
14. John Adam II, Baron Bayer of Boppard
29. Anna of Dompmartin
7. Anna, Baroness Bayer of Boppard
30. Claudius of Malberg-Adicht
15. Maria of Malburg-Adicht
31. Catherine of Brandenburg

== See also ==
- List of rulers of Baden

== Footnotes ==
Charles William, Margrave of Baden-Rodemachern House of Zähringen Born: 1627 Died: 1666
Preceded by Herman Fortunatus	Margrave of Baden-Rodemachern; 1665-1666	Succeeded by William as Margrave of Baden-Baden
