= Leopold Wilhelm, Margrave of Baden-Baden =

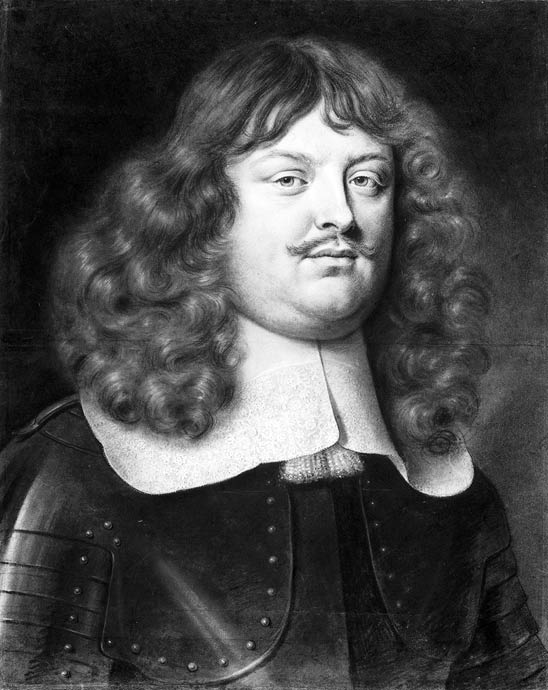
Leopold Wilhelm of Baden (by Wallerant Vaillant 1656, today in the Staatliche Kunsthalle Karlsruhe)

Margrave Leopold Wilhelm of Baden-Baden (German: Leopold Wilhelm Markgraf von Baden-Baden; 16 September 1626 in Baden-Baden; 1 March 1671 in Warasdin) was Field Marschal of the Holy Roman Empire of the German Nation.

== Life ==
He was the second son of Wilhelm, Margrave of Baden-Baden and Catharina Ursula von Hohenzollern–Hechingen. He was also the uncle of Louis William, Margrave of Baden-Baden.

The first Reichs-Generalfeldmarschall of the Reichsarmee in 1664, he fought against Sweden in Pomerania and against the Turks in Hungary at the Battle of Saint Gotthard. He was Governor and head of the General staff in Warasdin, Croatia, which was part of the Holy Roman Empire (1198–1806).

As his elder brother Ferdinand Maximilian of Baden-Baden, he died before his father and never ruled Baden-Baden.

== Marriage and children ==
Leopold Wilhelm von Baden married firstly in 1659 with Anna Silvia del Carretto, Countess of Millesimo (1607 – February 26, 1664). They had no children.

Secondly he married on February 23, 1666 with Countess Maria Franziska of Fürstenberg-Heiligenberg (May 18, 1633 – March 7, 1702), daughter of Ernst Egon VIII, Count of Fürstenberg-Heiligenberg.
They had 6 children:

1. Leopold Wilhelm (January 20, 1667 – April 11, 1716), no issue
2. A son (January 20, 1667 – January 20, 1677)
3. Karl Friedrich Ferdinand (September 14, 1668 – September 14, 1680)
4. Katharina Franziska (b. 1669 and died young)
5. Henriette (b. 1669 and died young)
6. Anna (b. 1670 and died young)
