= Charles William =

Charles William may refer to:

- Charles William, Margrave of Baden-Rodemachern (1627–1666)
- Charles William, Prince of Nassau-Usingen (1735–1803)
- Prince Charles William of Hesse-Darmstadt (1693–1707)
