= William Christopher of Baden-Baden =

German nobleman

- Born: 12 October 1628; Baden-Baden
- Died: 25 August 1652 (aged 23)
- Noble family: House of Zähringen
- Father: William, Margrave of Baden-Baden
- Mother: Catherine Ursula of Hohenzollern-Hechingen

Margrave William Christopher of Baden (12 October 1628 – 25 August 1652) was a margrave of Baden and canon at Cologne.

He is a son of Margrave William I of Baden-Baden from his first marriage to Countess Catherine Ursula of Hohenzollern-Hechingen (died: 2 June 1640), the daughter of Count John George of Hohenzollern-Hechingen.
