= Sibylle of Saxe-Lauenburg =

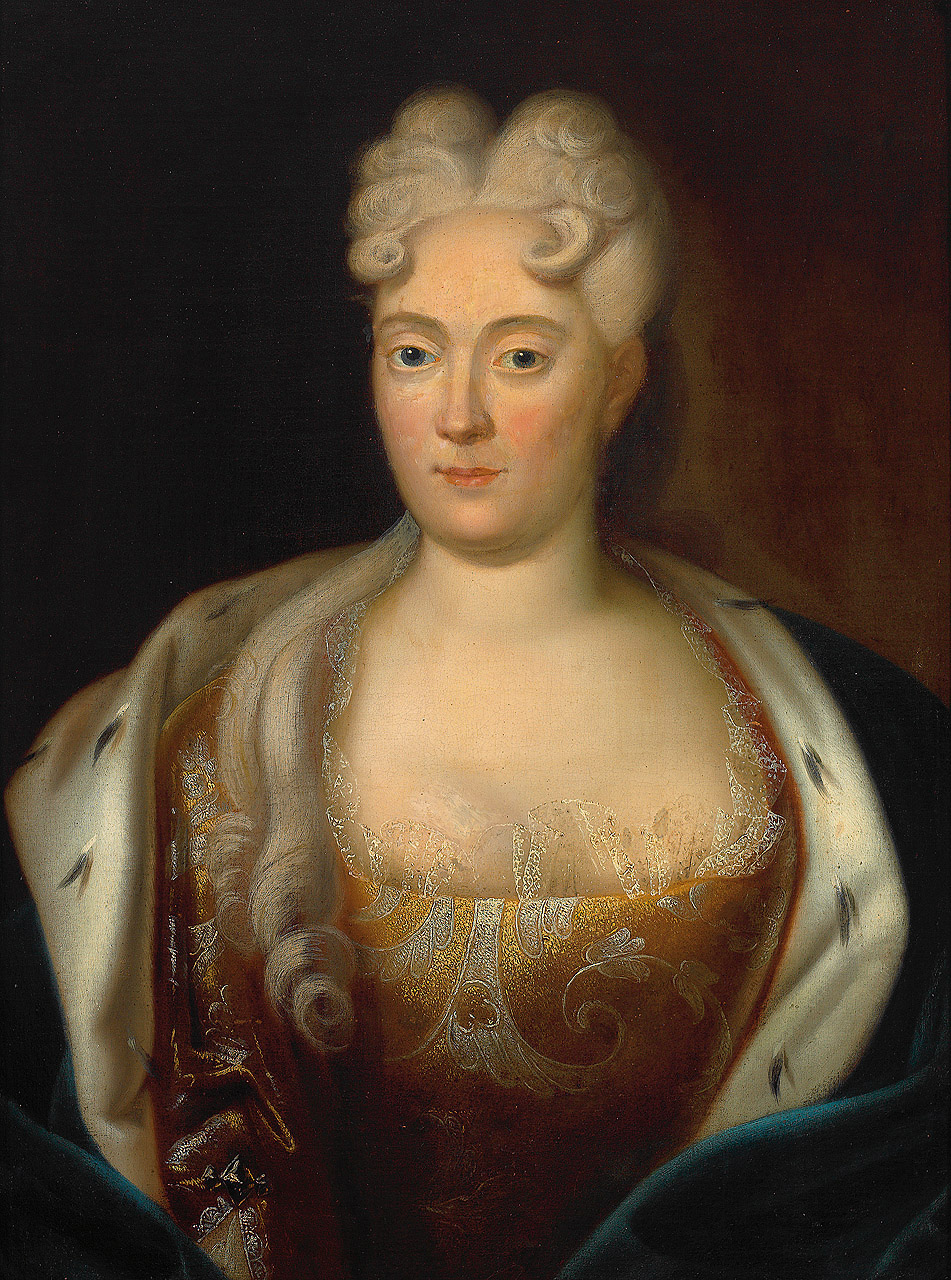
- Sibylle by an anonymous artist

Margravine consort of Baden-Baden
- Tenure: 17 March 1690 – 4 January 1707
- Born: 21 January 1675; Schloss Ratzeburg, Duchy of Saxe-Lauenburg
- Died: 10 July 1733 (aged 58); Schloss Ettlingen, Margraviate of Baden
- Burial: Schloss Rastatt, Germany
- Spouse: Louis William, Margrave of Baden-Baden (m. 1690; died 1707)
- Issue Detail: Princess Charlotte of Baden-Baden; Charles Joseph, Hereditary Prince of Baden-Baden; Princess Luise of Baden-Baden; Louis George, Margrave of Baden-Baden; Prince Wilhelm of Baden-Baden; Auguste, Duchess of Orléans; Augustus George, Margrave of Baden-Baden
Names
- Franziska Sibylle Auguste
- House: Ascania
- Father: Julius Francis, Duke of Saxe-Lauenburg
- Mother: Countess Palatine Maria Hedwig of Sulzbach
- Religion: Roman Catholicism

Sibylle of Saxe-Lauenburg (Franziska Sibylle Auguste; 21 January 1675 – 10 July 1733) was Margravine of Baden-Baden. Born a Duchess of Saxe-Lauenburg, she was the wife of Louis William, Margrave of Baden-Baden, a famous Imperial general who was known as the Türkenlouis. She was the consort of the ruler of Baden-Baden (1690–1707) and regent (1707–1727) during the minority of her son Louis George. Her older sister Anna Maria Franziska of Saxe-Lauenburg was the future Grand Duchess of Tuscany as the wife of Gian Gastone de' Medici.

== Early life ==
Franziska Sibylle Augusta was born in 1675 at the Schloss Ratzeburg, the second surviving daughter of Julius Francis, Duke of Saxe-Lauenburg and his wife Countess Palatine Maria Hedwig Augusta of Sulzbach.

In 1676 the family moved to Schlackenwerth in Bohemia where she and her sister spent their youth. When their mother died in 1681, their education was entrusted to Countess Eva Polyxena of Werschowitz (died 1699). Their education was conducted in the art of courtly etiquette in conversation, painting and music, deemed the traditional education for a female in the era. She was also taught by her grandfather Christian Augustus, Count Palatine of Sulzbach.

As the two sisters were the only surviving children of the duke and duchess of Saxe-Lauenburg, they were desirable candidates for marriage as their father's only heirs. Upon his death, Sibylle's sister would become the duchess of Saxe-Lauenburg in her own right and would pass the duchy to her children.

== Disputed succession ==
Sibylle's father Julius Francis, Duke of Saxe-Lauenburg died in 1689. According to court gossip, he was apparently poisoned; the alleged culprit, Countess Werschowitz. With his death, the Lauenburg line of the House of Ascania was extinct in the male line. However, female succession was possible by the Saxe-Lauenburgian laws.

As the legal heir to the duchy, Anna Maria Franziska and her sister Sibylle fought for Anna Maria's succession. The cousin of Julius Francis, Eleonore Charlotte of Saxe-Lauenburg-Franzhagen, was a rival claimant. Other monarchies also laid claim to the succession, evoking a further conflict involving the neighbouring duchies of Mecklenburg-Schwerin and of Danish Holstein, as well as the five Ascanian-ruled Principalities of Anhalt, the Electorate of Saxony, which had succeeded the Saxe-Wittenbergian Ascanians in 1422, Sweden and Brandenburg.

Their vulnerability as female claimants was taken advantage of by Duke George William of the neighbouring Brunswick-Lunenburgian Principality of Lunenburg-Celle, who invaded Saxe-Lauenburg with his troops, thus inhibiting Anna Maria's ascension as Duchess regnant. The conflict was finally settled on 9 October 1693 (Hamburger Vergleich), definitively dispossessing Anna Maria and her sister. The sisters never relinquished their claim.

Emperor Leopold I rejected Celle's annexation and so retained the Saxe-Lauenburgian exclave of Hadeln, which was out of Celle's reach, in his custody. Not until 1728, when his son Emperor Charles VI enfeoffed George II Augustus with Saxe-Lauenburg, was the de facto takeover by his grandfather in 1689 and 1693 finally legitimised. In 1731 George II Augustus also gained Hadeln from imperial custody.

Although the emperor had deemed that Sibylle's sister Anna Maria Franziska would marry Prince Eugene of Savoy, again due to his service in the name of the emperor, she instead married Philipp Wilhelm of the Palatinate, son of Philip William, Elector Palatine and Elisabeth Amalie of Hesse-Darmstadt. When Philipp Wilhelm died in 1693, she married Gian Gastone de' Medici, Grand Prince of Tuscany and son of Cosimo III de' Medici, Grand Duke of Tuscany and Marguerite Louise d'Orléans. (Note: Grand daughter of Henry IV of France and Marie de' Medici (first cousin of Louis XIV).)

== Margrave of Baden-Baden and marriage ==
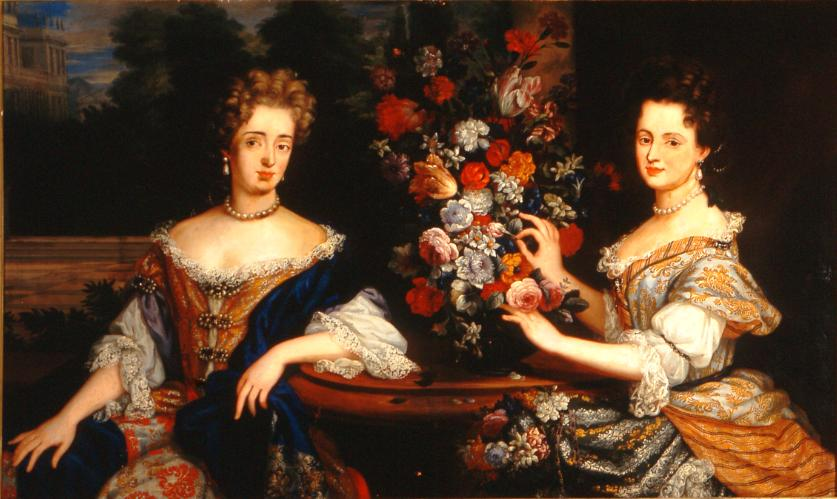
Sibylle (L) with her sister Anna Maria Franziska, c.1690 by an anonymous artist

Sibylle was due to marry Prince Eugene of Savoy but preferred the other candidate, the older and impoverished Margrave of Baden-Baden. Although a reigning prince, he had lost practically everything due to the war with France. Sibylle was engaged to Louis William, Margrave of Baden-Baden, some 20 years older than she and childless. He was known as "Turkish Louis" (Türkenlouis) due to his famous exploits against the Ottomans and his efforts against Louis XIV in the field as part of the Imperial Army.

Louis William travelled to meet his young bride in Bohemia, arriving on 10 January 1690. The couple were officially betrothed on 14 January and the actual marriage occurred on 27 March 1690. Sibylle thus became Margravine of Baden-Baden at the age of 15. The couple were supposed to be married at Castle in Roudnice nad Labem. Because the main residence of the Margrave in Baden-Baden had been destroyed by the French, the newlyweds stayed in Ostrov instead.

Shortly after his marriage to Sibylle, Margrave Louis William was again engaged in the war against the Ottomans. The battle of Slankamen in 1691 was his greatest triumph. In the early years of the marriage, Sibylle was often separated from her husband; as she had ample time to cultivate her personal interests with her husband absent from home, she soon became involved in the management of their property, an experience from which they drew much benefit later.

Although the exchange of letters between the young Sibylle and her husband have been lost, letters between Sibylle and her grandfather, Christian August, Count Palatine of Sulzbach survived. Their close relationship is apparent from their correspondence, and from his letters it is obvious that Christian August adored his youngest granddaughter.

== Issue ==
The surviving children of Sibylle

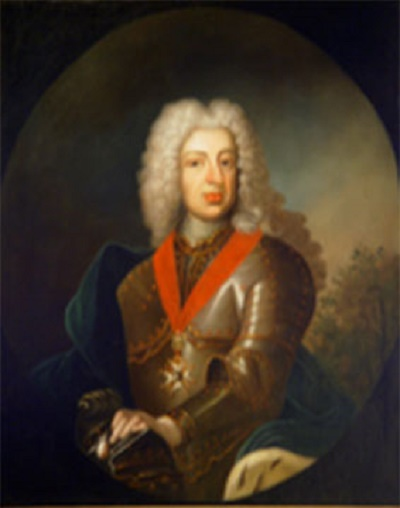
Sibylle's eldest surviving son, Louis George, for whom she was regent

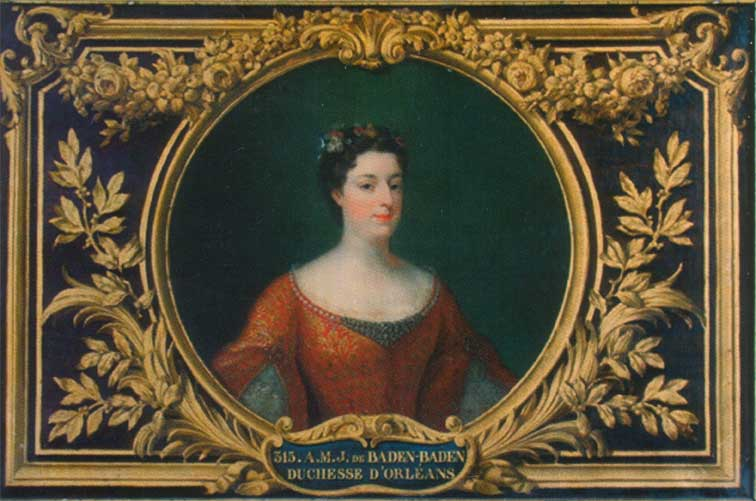
Sibylle's only surviving daughter Johanna, future Duchess of Orléans, by Belle

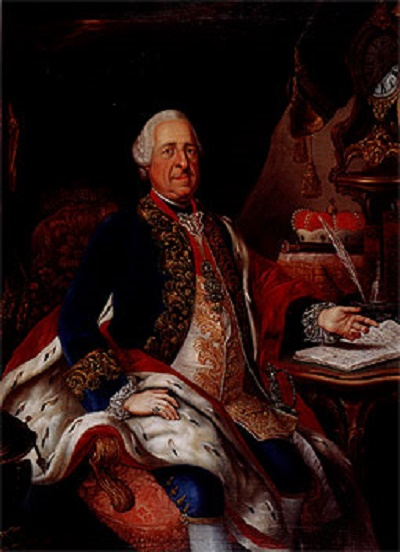
Sibylle's youngest son Augustus George

The couple had nine children in all but were destined to see most of them die in childhood. With regards to her children, Sibylle was nicknamed the unlucky: her first pregnancy ended in miscarriage; the first child lived for four months, the second for three years, the third for five years, the fourth for one year, the fifth for six years. When her second son Charles Joseph, Hereditary Prince of Baden-Baden, died in 1703, she made a first pilgrimage to Einsiedeln Abbey's Marian Chapel of Grace; it was followed by another seven pilgrimages.

Of the couple's nine children, only three reached the tenth year of life – two sons and a daughter. Of the two sons, one was childless and the other had only one daughter, who in turn was childless. Sibylle's only surviving progeny are through her daughter Auguste Marie Johanna ("Johanna"), who married Louis d'Orléans, grandson of Louis XIV. Through Auguste, Sibylle was the great-grandmother of Louis Philippe I, King of the French. Auguste died in childbirth at age 21.

The children born to Sibylle were:

1. Leopold William (Günsburg, 28 November 1694 – Günsburg, March 1695), (Note: According to other sources he lived 28 November 1695 – 19 May 1696.) Hereditary Prince of Baden-Baden, died in infancy
2. Charlotte (Günsburg, 7 August 1696 – 16 January 1700), died in childhood
3. Charles Joseph (Augsburg, 30 September 1697 – Schlackenwerth, 9 March 1703), Hereditary Prince of Baden-Baden, died in childhood
4. Wilhelmine (Schlackenwerth, 14 August 1700 – Schlackenwerth, 16 May 1702), died in childhood. (Note: According to other sources she lived 16 August 1699 – 2 June 1700)
5. Louise (Nürnberg, 8 or 9 May 1701 – 23 September 1707), died in childhood
6. Louis George Simpert (Ettlingen, 7 June 1702 – Rastatt, 22 October 1761), Margrave of Baden-Baden, married first Maria Anna of Schwarzenberg, later Maria Anna of Bavaria
7. William George Simpert (Aschaffenburg, 5 September 1703 – Baden-Baden, 16 February 1709), died in childhood
8. Auguste Marie Johanna (Aschaffenburg, 10 November 1704 – Paris, 8 August 1726), married Louis d'Orléans, Duke of Orléans, and had issue one surviving son. She was an ancestor of Louis Philippe I, King of France.
9. Augustus George Simpert (Rastatt, 14 January 1706 – Rastatt, 21 October 1771), succeeded his older brother as Margrave of Baden-Baden in 1761, married Marie Victoire d'Arenberg; no legitimate issue.

On the death of Augustus George, the state passed to a distant cousin, Charles Frederick, Grand Duke of Baden and was united with the Margraviate of Baden-Durlach under his rule.

== Regent ==
Sibylle's husband Louis William died aged 51 in January 1707, of a war injury. He was succeeded by their eldest surviving son Louis George, who from his birth in 1702 had been Hereditary Prince of Baden-Baden.

As Louis George was aged five at the time, Sibylle was created the Regent of Baden-Baden in the name of her son. Sibylle has been credited with the reconstruction of Baden-Baden, a state which had been greatly ravaged by the French during their various wars, prior to Louis George's birth. She held a tight rein on the state's finances and by the time of Louis George's majority in 1727, Baden-Baden was once again flourishing and she had considerably augmented her son's own personal fortune. Whenever she could, she made journeys to neighbouring secular advisors, such as Leopold, Duke of Lorraine and the Elector Johann Wilhelm, Elector Palatine. She also travelled to seek spiritual support.

During her regency, she helped reconstruct and create many splendid buildings, including palaces, villas and places of worship. With the Treaty of Rastatt in 1714, she built the Einsiedeln Chapel in Rastatt in gratitude.

== Later years ==
=== Marriage alliance ===
With her only daughter, Johanna, being as yet unmarried in 1723, Sibylle embarked on the task of finding an advantageous match for her. Sibylle proposed two candidates to her daughter: Prince Alexander Ferdinand of Thurn and Taxis, son and heir of Anselm Franz of Thurn and Taxis, a wealthy German noble of the powerful Thurn und Taxis family and the Postmaster General of the Holy Roman Empire; the second, a French nobleman Louis d'Orléans, Duke of Orléans. Her mother preferred the French match as it would strengthen ties with a powerful neighbour – one which had ravaged Baden-Baden in the years prior to Johanna's birth. Johanna preferred the German match. In the end, Johanna acquiesced to her mother's preference and agreed to marry Louis d'Orléans. There was a proxy ceremony held at the Schloss Rastatt before she was married in person on 13 July 1724 to Louis, the grandson of Louis XIV of France. Chosen for, among other reasons, her family's Catholicism, she brought a comparatively small dowry of 80,000 livres to the House of Orléans.

=== Retirement and death ===
Louis George reached his majority on 22 October 1727 at the age of 25. Sibylle thus retired from state administration to Ettlingen Palace in Ettlingen. Having retired, she made pilgrimages and under the influence of the Cardinal Damian Hugo Philipp von Schönborn, she led a very religious life and visited several monasteries. In her dowager years, she also carried out various improvements which were finished in the year of her death.

Sibylle, born a Duchess of Saxe-Lauenburg, Margravine of Baden-Baden and Regent of Baden-Baden died at the Schloss Ettlingen on 10 July 1733 at the age of 58. As instructed in her will she was buried at the Schloss Rastatt with little pomp.

== Architectural legacy ==
Siyblle had an active interest in architecture as well as property management. While living in Ostrov with her husband in the first years of their marriage, the two carried out improvements to the Weißes Schloss ('white castle'). Their chosen architect was Johann Michael Sock.

Sibylle's most significant legacy was Schloss Rastatt, which became the main residence of the rulers of Baden-Baden when Rastatt was promoted to city status in 1700. The residence in Rastatt is the oldest baroque residence in the German Upper Rhine area and was built according to the example of the French Palace of Versailles. (Note: During the 19th century the castle was used as headquarters of the fort.)

She also carried out various other projects:

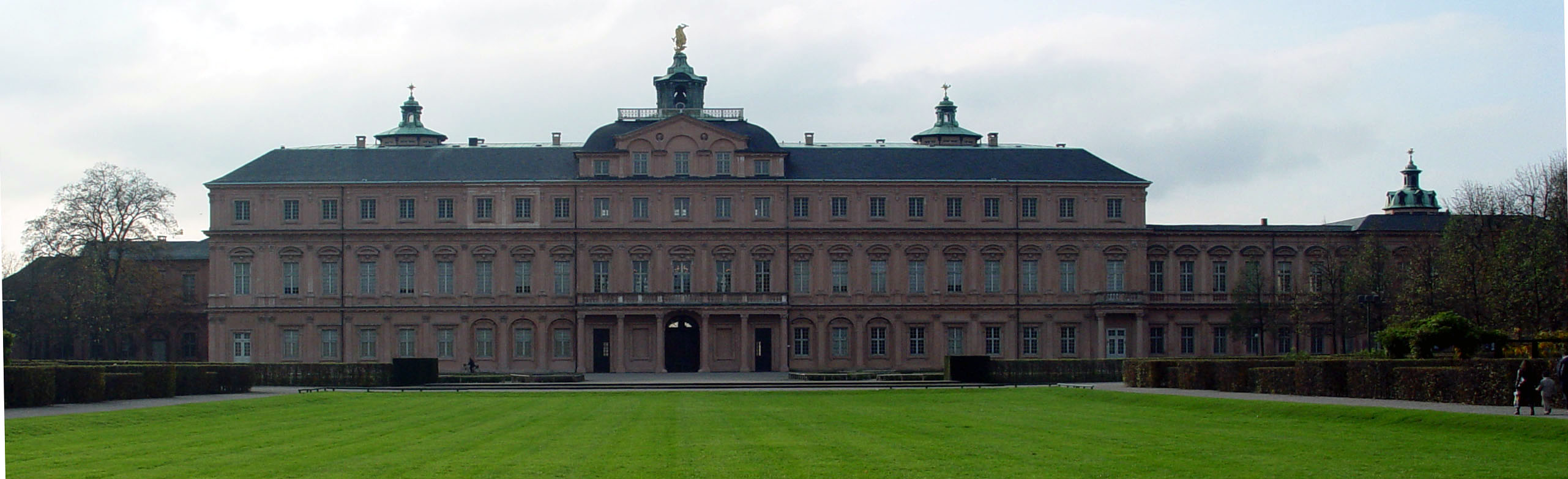
The Schloss Rastatt in Rastatt.

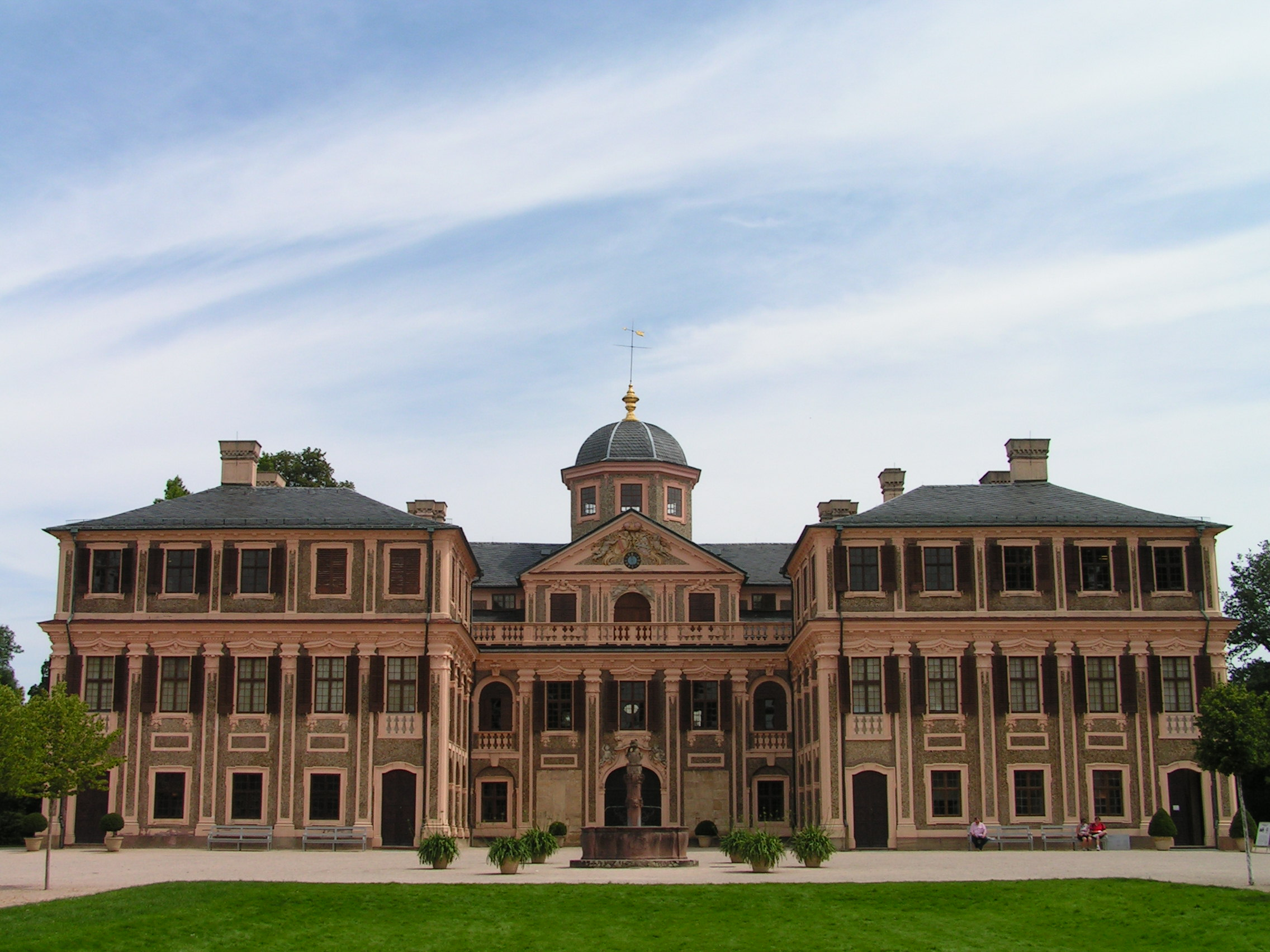
The Schloss Favorite built by Sibylle

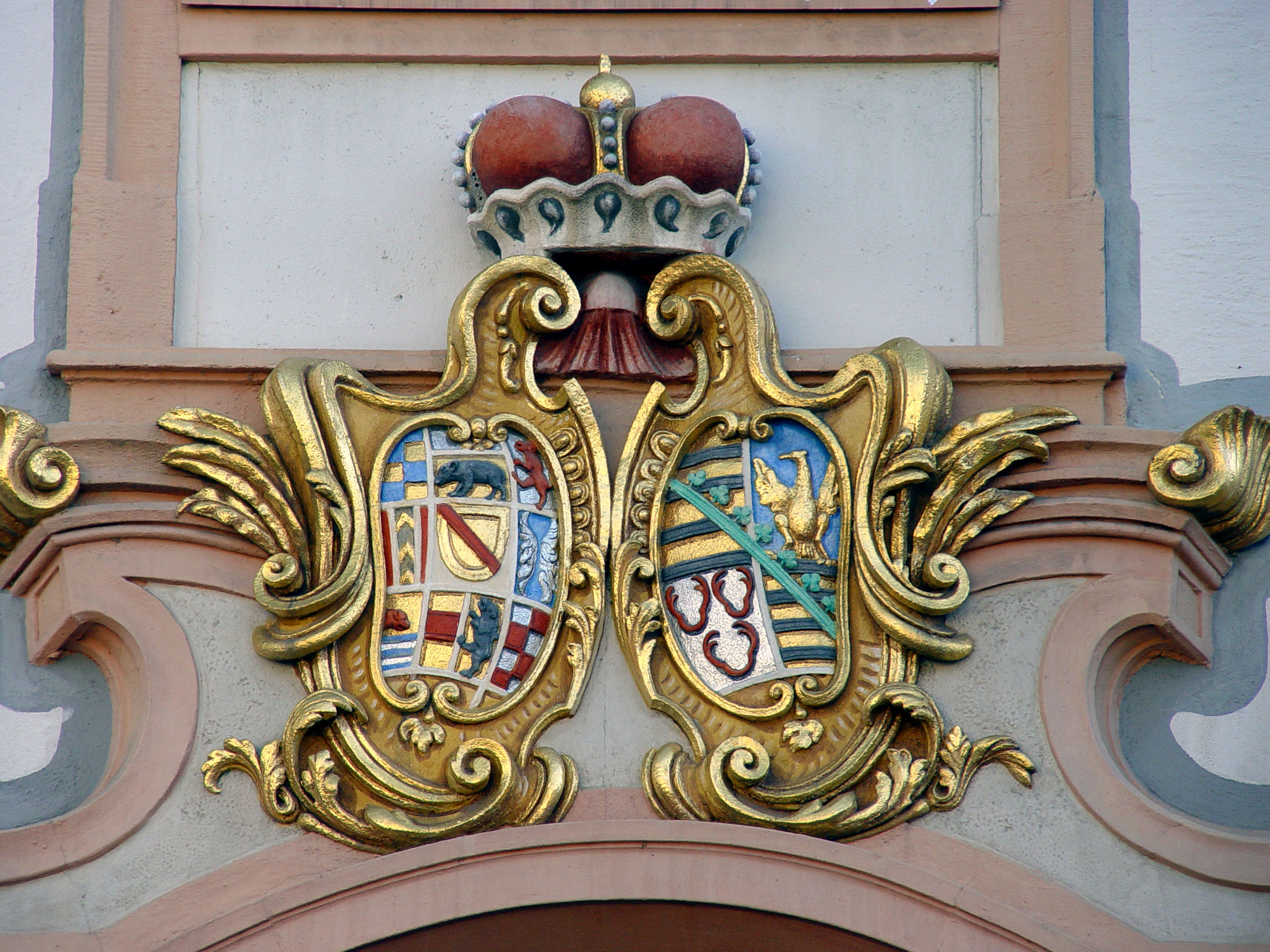
Arms of alliance (Allianzwappen), Schloss Ettlingen; left: Ludwig Wilhelm Markgraf von Baden-Baden, right: Franziska Maria Sibylla Augusta von Sachsen-Lauenburg-Ratzeburg

- 1707 : Renovations begin at the Schloss Rastatt;
- 1710 : Construction on the Schloss Favorite begins;
- 1713 : Construction on the Valentin Church, Karlsruhe begins;
- 1714 : Reconstruction in Rastatt begins;
- 1715 : Construction on the Einsiedeln Chapel begins;
- 1717 : Construction on the Home Office, Offenburg begins;
- 1717 : Construction on the Fremersberg hunting lodge begins;
- 1718 : Hermitage Museum in the Park of Schloss Favorite is built;
- 1719 : Holy Cross Church (Castle Church) in Rastatt is built;
- 1721 : Loretokapelle is built;
- 1721 : Extension of the Jagdschloss (hunting lodge) Scheibenhardt in Bülach (see Beiertheim-Bulach);
- 1722 : Pagodenburg is built in the gardens of Rastatt;
- 1723 : Extensions on the Schloss Bruchsal (Note: Residence of Damian Hugo Philipp von Schönborn, Sibylle's religious counsellor.)
- 1724 : Hermitage in Waghäusel is built;
- 1724 : Redesigning of the Schloss Kislau;
- 1724 : Various projects at Scheibenhardt;
- 1728 : Expansion of Ettlingen Palace;
- 1731 : Chapel in Ettlingen Palace;
- 1730 : Reconstruction of the nave of the church of St. Martin in Ettlingen.

== Ancestry ==
Ancestors of Sibylle of Saxe-Lauenburg

8. Francis II, Duke of Saxe-Lauenburg
4. Julius Henry, Duke of Saxe-Lauenburg
9. Duchess Maria of Brunswick-Lüneburg
2. Julius Francis, Duke of Saxe-Lauenburg
10. Vilém mladší Lobkowicz
5. Baroness Anna Magdalene von Lobkowitz
11. Kateřina Benigna Popelovna Lobkowicz
1. Sibylle of Saxe-Lauenburg
12. Augustus, Count Palatine of Sulzbach
6. Christian Augustus, Count Palatine of Sulzbach
13. Princess Hedwig of Schleswig-Holstein-Gottorp
3. Countess Palatine Maria Hedwig of Sulzbach
14. John VII, Count of Nassau-Siegen
7. Countess Amalie of Nassau-Siegen
15. Margaret of Schleswig-Holstein-Sonderburg

== Sources ==
- Otto Flake: Türkenlouis. Gemälde einer Zeit. 2. Auflage. Fischer, Frankfurt am Main 1988, ISBN 3-596-25788-3
- Saskia Esser: Leben und Werk der Markgräfin Franziska Sibylla Augusta. Ausstellungskatalog, Stadt Rastatt, Rastatt 1983, ISBN 3-923082-01-0
- Clemens Jöckle: Maria-Einsiedeln-Kapelle Rastatt. Schnell & Steiner, Regensburg 1999, ISBN 3-7954-5971-0
- Hans-Georg Kaack: Markgräfin Sibylla Augusta. Die große badische Fürstin der. Barockzeit. Stadler, Konstanz 1983, ISBN 3-7977-0097-0
- Anna Maria Renner: Sybilla Augusta. Markgräfin von Baden. Die Geschichte eines denkwürdigen Lebens. 4. Auflage. Müller, Karlsruhe 1981, ISBN 3-7880-9665-9
- Gerlinde Vetter: Zwischen Glanz und Frömmigkeit. Der Hof der badischen Markgräfin Sibylla Augusta. Katz, Gernsbach 2006, ISBN 3-938047-19-4
- Rudolf Sillib: Schloß Favorite und die Eremitagen der Markgräfin Franziska Sibylla Augusta von Baden-Baden. Neujahrsblätter der Badischen Historischen Kommission, Neue Folge 17. Carl Winters Universitätsbuchhandlung, Heidelberg 1914.

Vacant Title last held by Maria Magdalena of Oettingen-Baldern	Margravine consort of Baden-Baden; 1690–1707	Vacant Title next held by Maria Anna of Schwarzenberg
