= Baden-Baden witch trials =

Witch trials in Baden-Baden Germany between 1627 and 1631

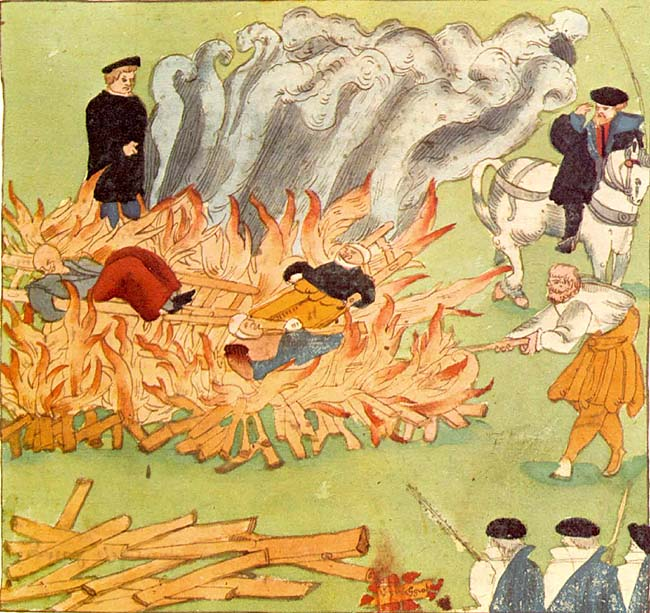
Baden-Baden witch trials

The Baden-Baden witch trials took place in Baden-Baden in Germany between 1627 and 1631. These witch trials resulted in the deaths of over 200 people; the exact number are uncertain. The trials belonged to the great wave of witch-hunting that took place in southwestern Germany during the Thirty Years' War.

The process begun when doctor Matern Eschbach, an official of William, Margrave of Baden-Baden, initiated an investigation of witchcraft in the city of Baden on 16 September 1627. Doctor Eschbach was considered a witchcraft expert and consulted in how the trials were to be performed. The people arrested were interrogated until the proof were considered enough to motivate the use of torture; after which they were forced to name at least fifteen accomplices, which resulted in a rapid expansion of the witch trials across the territory of Baden-Baden.

The number of executed are not confirmed. However it is estimated that some 244 people, mostly women, were charged and 231 were condemned and burned.

The Baden-Baden witch trials took place in an area strongly affected by the Counter-Reformation. After the Battle of Wimpfen of 1622, the area was re-Catholicized by a Counter-Reformation introduced by the Jesuits. It has been suggested that the witch trials were a part of the Counter-Reformation of Baden. It is confirmed that the Catholic priests broke the secrecy of confession during the witch trials and that they revealed what the members of their congregations had said during confession, and this has been viewed as an indicator that the priests revealed crypto Protestants to the witch hunters; while only six victims of the witch hunt are clearly stated to have been officially Protestants, the majority of adults in the area would have been Protestants only a few years prior. However, this theory as not proven due to the lack of documentation.

The investigation was finally ended on 10 April 1631. Traditionally, the reason for why it ended has been attributed to the Swedish army of Gustavus Adolphus of Sweden getting closer to the territory. Whether this is correct is unconfirmed; the Swedish army did not occupy the area in 1631, but it is possible that the Baden authorities wrongly believed that it would do so.
