= Battle of Derventa =

Battle between the Holy Roman Empire and Ottoman Empire on 5 September 1688

- Part of Great Turkish War
Date	5 September 1688
Location	Derventa
Result	Holy League victory
Territorial changes	Habsburgs conquer most of Croatia

Belligerents
Holy Roman Empire	Ottoman Empire

Commanders and leaders
(Holy Roman Empire) Ludwig Wilhelm	Pasha Sziavusz of Bosnia

Strength
4,000	15,000

Casualties and losses
200	5,000 killed 2,000 prisoners

The Battle of Derventa took place between the Holy Roman Empire and Ottoman Empire on 5 September 1688. It ended in a Holy Roman Empire victory.

== Background ==
The allied Christian forces had won a great victory at Mohács in August 1687, as revenge from 1526. It resulted in Central Hungary being liberated, except for a few castles. The Ottomans were forced to retreat to the other side of the Sava River. As for the next year, the Habsburg military council choose to liberate the important stronghold of Belgrade (Nándorfehérvár) that stood between the Száva and the Danube rivers.

== Battle ==
While the main army led by the Maximilian II Emmanuel marched against the castle, Count Louis of Baden joined forces with the Croatian army of Bán (Duke) Erdődy II Miklós and they were marching along the Száva River. The Transylvanian army, the troops of Colonel Lorenz von Hoffkirchen and Erdődy's 4,000 strong force all joined him. In the meantime, Pasha Sziavusz of Bosnia either tried to destroy the crossing places over the Una River or reinforce the fords, but it proved to be useless to stop Louis of Baden who forced his army through the river near Kosztajnica on 13 August. Pasha Sziavusz decided to withdraw his troops so Kosztajnica fell to the Christians on the next day. Dubica was also taken and Gradiska fell on 21 August. The troops of the Count continued their advance on the southern bank of the Száva (Sava) River. They reached Brod on 28 August and the Count had the town reinforced and turned it into a strong bridgehead in order to guard his supply lines. During this time, the units of Pasha Sziavusz were at a camp in Derventa. Louis of Baden decided to make a sneak attack. The Pasha didn't want to miss the opportunity and he ordered his scouting cavalrymen to approach the Christian camp. The Count left behind the supply wagons and his infantry and then set out against the Ottoman Empire in nighttime of 5 September. However, he was surprised to find out that the Pasha had 15,000 soldiers and not just 7,000. The Ottoman army stood on higher ground. The Count had to decide whether to attack or retreat but the latter would have been a dangerous move and he didn't like retreating, anyway. He made a quick decision and assaulted the enemy from march, in spite of being badly outnumbered. He had taken his cavalry through a pass before his vanguard was immediately ambushed by some Ottoman cavalrymen. As the Imperial troops were tired due the night march, they were slowly steamrolled by the Ottomans. In the decisive moment, the unit of Major General Count Friedrich Magnus zu Castell appeared on the battlefield and attacked the enemy in the side. The Ottoman cavalry fled and the Imperials began to chase them at once and ran headlong into the Janissaries. Many Janissary troops were slaughtered. There were 5,000 of them killed and 2,000 were taken prisoner. The Holy Roman Empire forces on the other hand only suffered 200 casualties.

== Aftermath ==
After the victory, Count Louis of Baden returned to Brod where the reinforcements sent by Maximilian Emanuel arrived too. The Count decided to go on and take Zvornik town but the crossing places of the Drina River had been blocked by the Pasha. Despite this, the Count broke through these blockades and marched into the town abandoned by the Pasha, on 25 September. As for him, these most successful fights have been ended for this year and Count Louis of Baden returned to Vienna.
