= Louis William, Margrave of Baden-Baden =

German noble and general (1655–1707)

Louis William
- Margrave of Baden-Baden
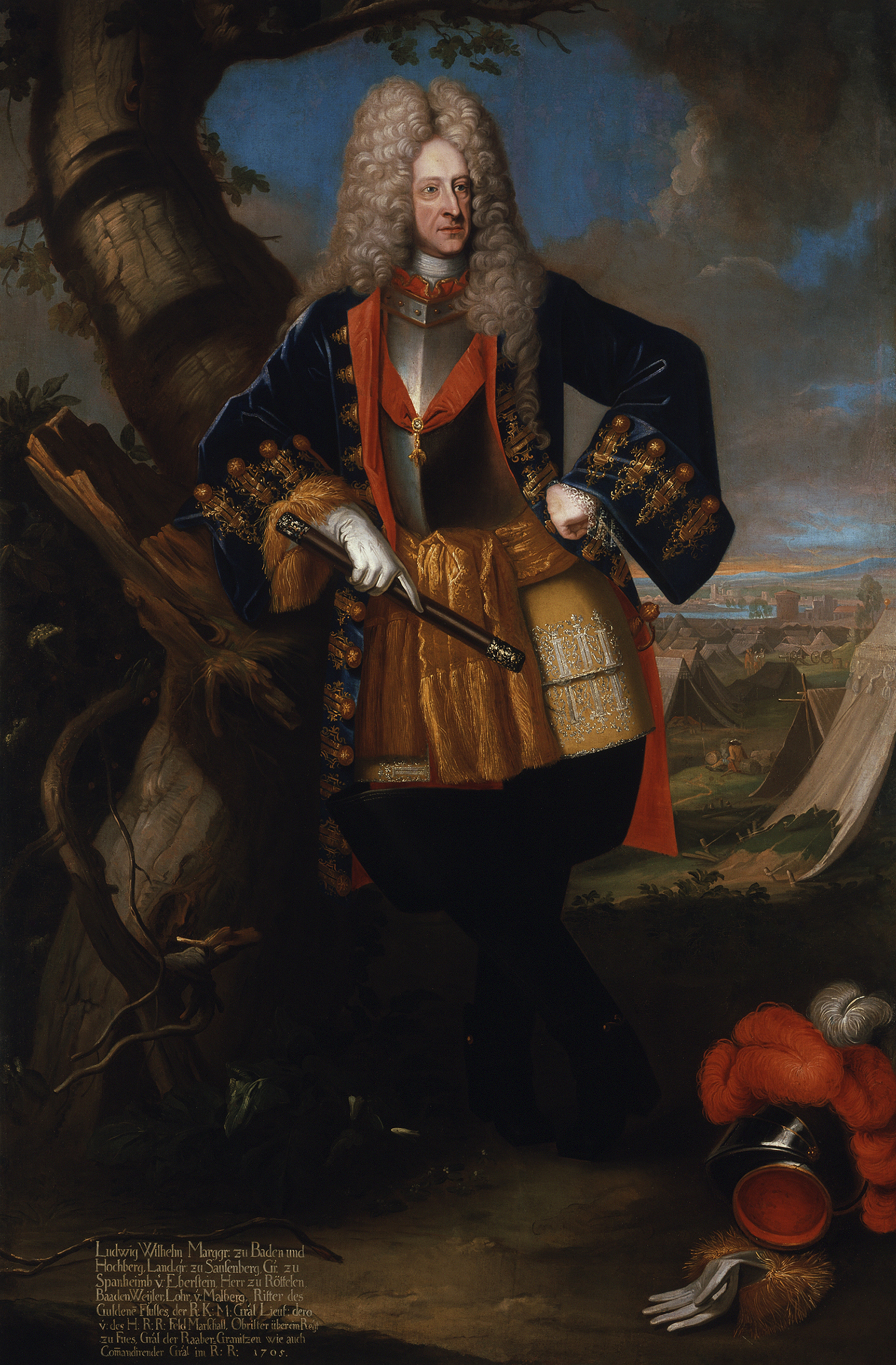
- Portrait in 1705
- Born: 8 April 1655; Hôtel de Soissons, Paris, France
- Died: 4 January 1707 (aged 51); Schloss Rastatt, Rastatt, Baden, Holy Roman Empire
- Burial: Stiftskirche, Baden-Baden
- Spouse: Sibylle of Saxe-Lauenburg (m. 1690)
- Issue Detail: Louis George, Margrave of Baden-Baden; Auguste, Duchess of Orléans; Augustus George, Margrave of Baden-Baden
- House: House of Zähringen
- Father: Ferdinand Maximilian of Baden-Baden
- Mother: Louise of Savoy
- Religion: Roman Catholic
- Military career
- Nicknames: Türkenlouis; The Red King
- Conflicts: See list: Franco-Dutch War; Siege of Philippsburg (1676); Battle of Ortenbach; Great Turkish War; Battle of Vienna; Battle of Párkány; Siege of Buda (1684); Siege of Buda (1686); Siege of Pécs; Battle of Mohács (1687); Siege of Kostajnica (1688); Battle of Derventa; Battle of Kostajnica (1689); Battle of Batočina; Battle of Niš (1689); Battle of Slankamen; Siege of Petrovaradin (1691); War of the Grand Alliance; Battle of Horkheim (1693); Battle of Ilsfeld (1693); War of the Spanish Succession; Siege of Landau (1702); Battle of Friedlingen; Lines of Stollhofen; Battle of Schellenberg

Louis William, Margrave of Baden-Baden (German: Ludwig Wilhelm von Baden-Baden; 8 April 1655 – 4 January 1707) was the ruling Margrave of Baden-Baden in Germany, chief commander of the Imperial army and Reichsgeneralfeldmarschall of the Holy Roman Empire. He was also known as Türkenlouis ('Turkish Louis') for his numerous victories against Ottoman forces. After his death in 1707, his wife, Sibylle of Saxe-Lauenburg, acted as regent of Baden-Baden during the minority of his eldest son, who succeeded him as Margrave of Baden-Baden.

== Family ==
Born in Paris, Louis was a son of Hereditary Prince Ferdinand Maximilian of Baden-Baden and his French wife, Louise of Savoy. His godfather was Louis XIV of France. His father was the elder son of Wilhelm, Margrave of Baden-Baden, whom he pre-deceased, leaving Louis to succeed as reigning Margrave of Baden-Baden and head of the Catholic branch of the House of Zähringen.

His mother's brother was the Count of Soissons, father of the renowned general Prince Eugene of Savoy, whose military career would start in the shadow of Louis, Eugene being Louis's junior; the cousins would serve together the Holy Roman Emperor against the French in several campaigns. His parents being estranged, his father took him with him when he left from his wife's home in Paris to Germany. There, Louis was raised by his grandparents.

== Military career ==
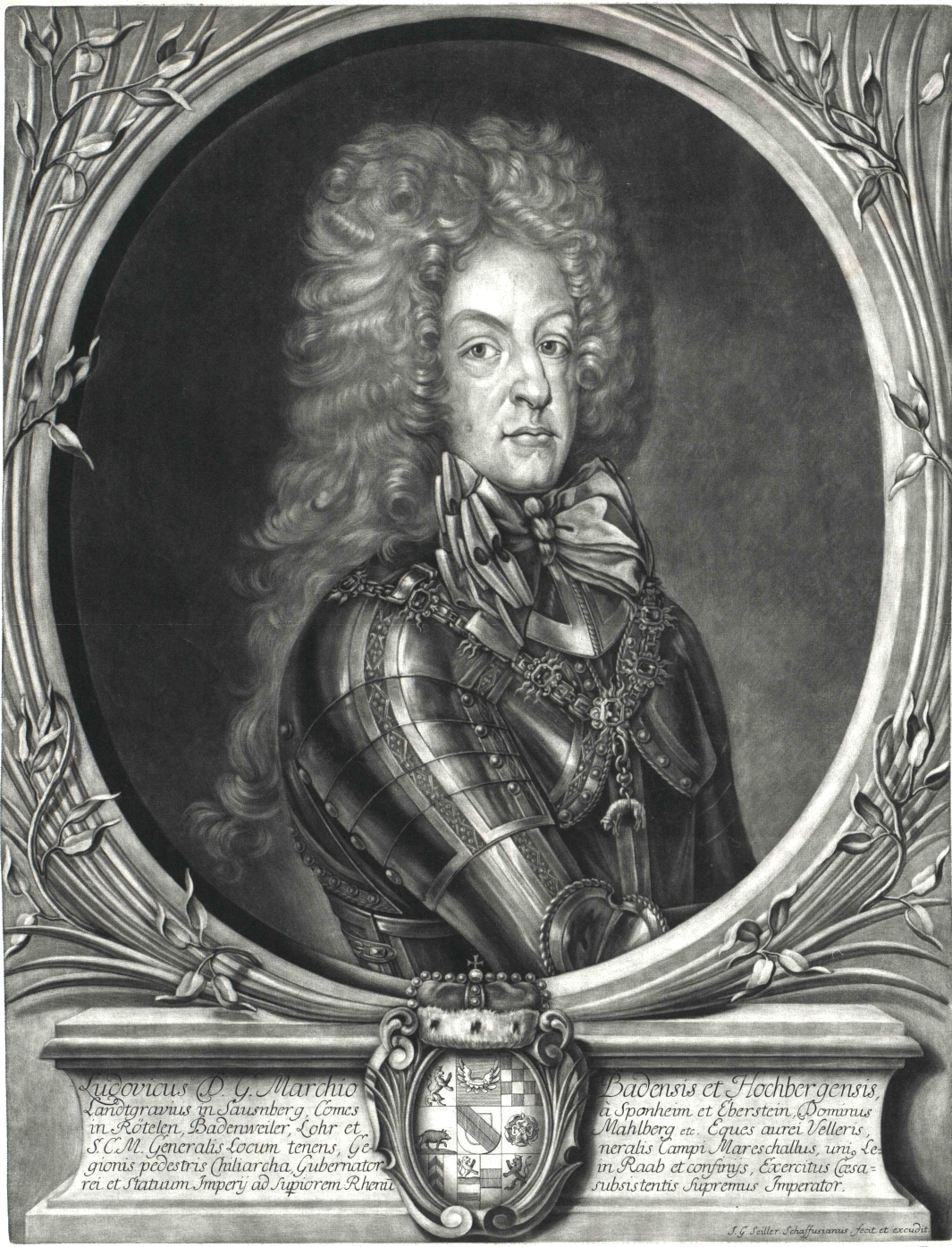
Louis William, Margrave of Baden-Baden

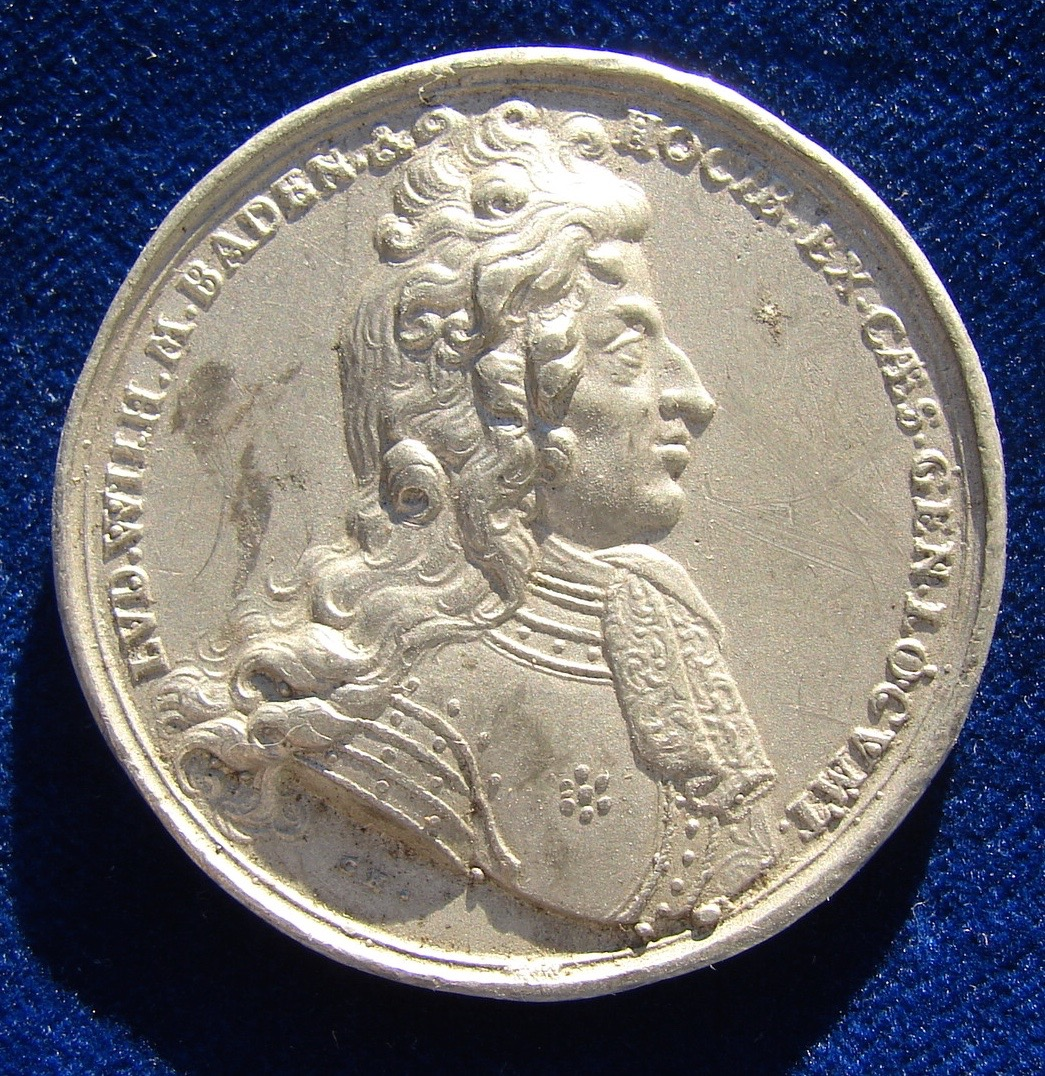
The portrait of Türkenlouis in 1691, on a medallion by Georg Hautsch celebrating the victory against the Ottoman Empire at Slankamen, obverse.

Louis William served first under Raimondo Montecuccoli against Turenne, and then under the duke of Lorraine. His career was stimulated by his uncle Hermann of Baden-Baden, later president of the Hofkriegsrat. Together with his uncle, Louis took part in the capture of Philippsburg in 1676. At the siege of Vienna by the Turks, in 1683, he threw his forces into the city, and by a brilliant sally effected a junction with Jan III Sobieski and the Duke of Lorraine, who had come to its relief. In 1689 he defeated the Turks at Niš.

Louis came to be called the Türkenlouis or shield of the empire. The Turks called him the red king, because his red uniform jacket made him very visible on the battlefield. He was known as a defender of Europe against the Turks, as was Eugene of Savoy. As a military commander in the service of the Holy Roman Empire, in 1689 he was made chief commander of the Imperial army in Hungary, where he scored a resounding victory against the Ottomans at Slankamen in 1691. Louis saw Osijek as a location of exceptional strategic importance in the war against the Ottomans. He urged the repair of the city walls, and proposed construction of a new fort called Tvrđa, according to Vauban's principles of military engineering.

After a fruitless campaign in 1692 due to a lack of funds and soldiers, he was appointed to the Upper Rhine at the request of the Swabian and Franconian Imperial circles. At the head of the circle troops that formed the Army of the Holy Roman Empire he defended the Rhine against superior French forces in the War of the Grand Alliance. Despite his military successes, his opposition against the elevation of the Prince of Calenberg to Elector of Brunswick-Lüneburg made him enemies at the Vienna Court.

In 1701, he built the Lines of Stollhofen, a line of defensive earthworks designed to protect northern Baden from French attack. He later commanded the imperial army at the Upper Rhine in the War of the Spanish Succession where he successfully concluded the Siege of Landau in September 1702, but soon had to withdraw across the Rhine and was defeated by the French under the Duke of Villars at Friedlingen. In 1704 however, he participated in the successful German campaign of Marlborough and Eugene of Savoy. He distinguished himself in the Battle of Schellenberg and besieged and conquered Ingolstadt and Landau, thus drawing Bavarian troops away from the decisive Battle of Blenheim.

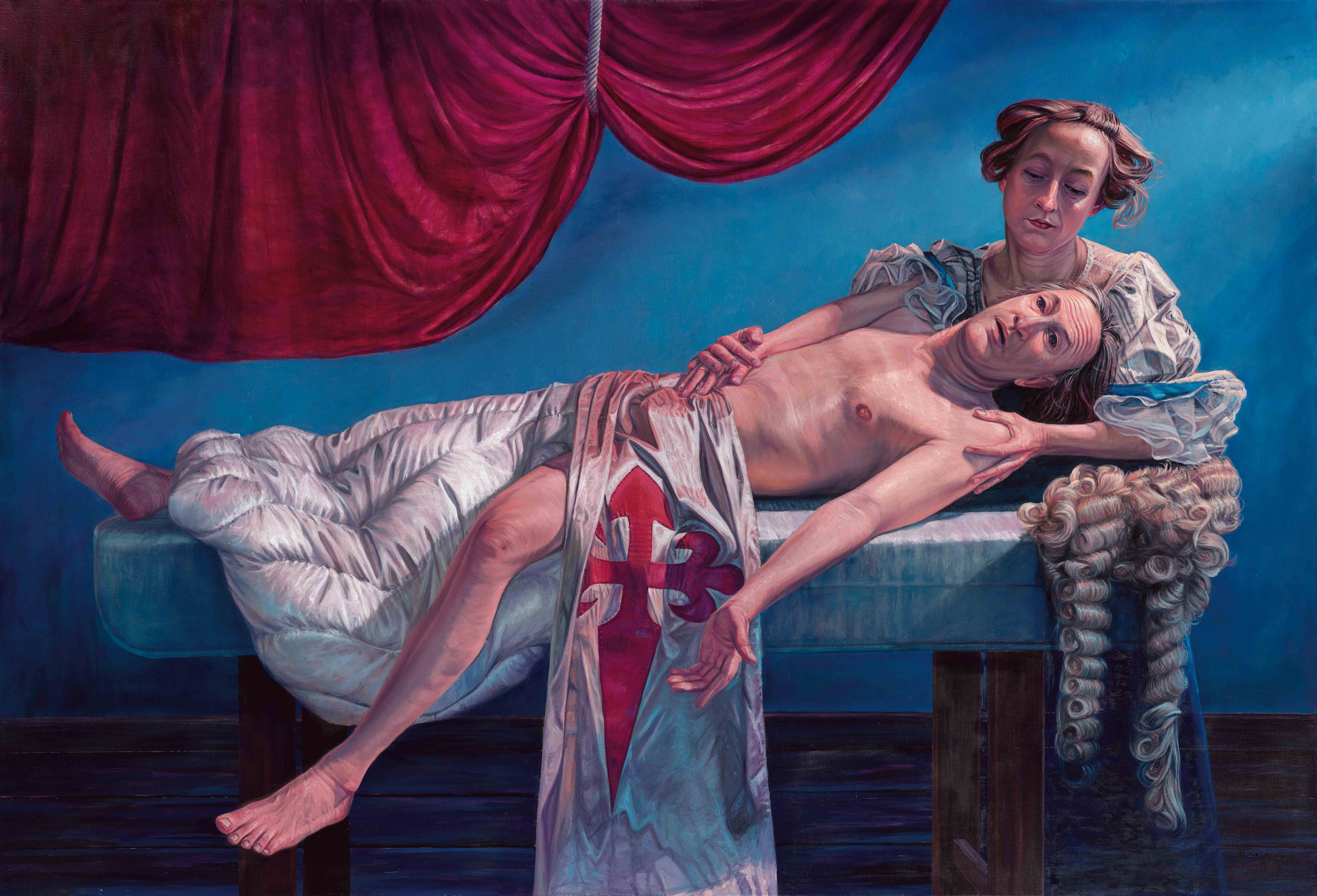
Aris Kalaizis "The Last Hours of Louis William", Oil on canvas, 130 x190 cm, 2021

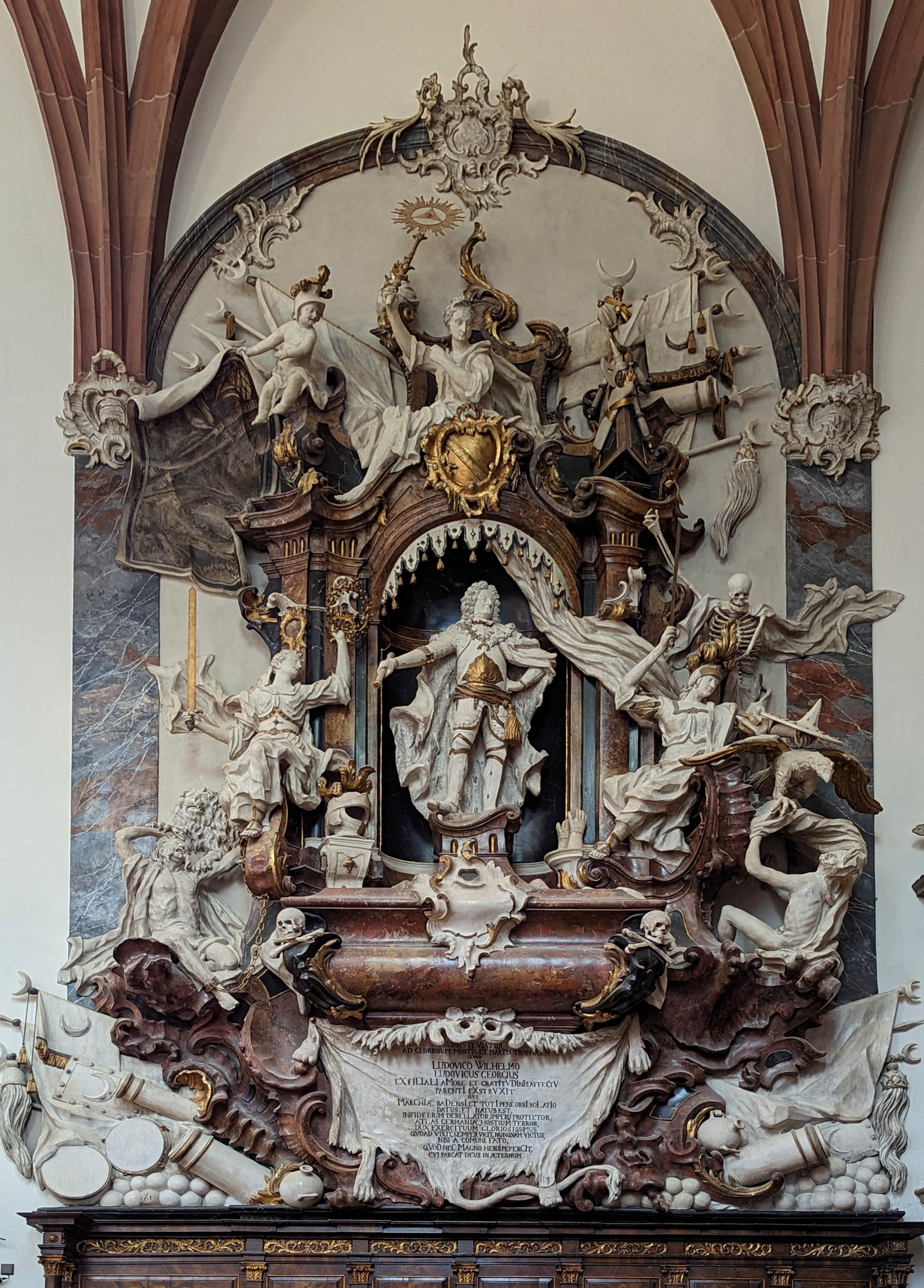
Epitaph of Ludwig Wilhelm in Baden-Baden

At the Battle of Schellenberg in July 1704, Ludwig Wilhelm had suffered a wound that did not fully heal. He continued to command on the Upper Rhine without treating the injury and died as a result of this wound on January 4, 1707 at the age of 51 in his unfinished Schloss Rastatt. His wife took up a regency for their son, Louis George. The latter took over the government from his mother in October 1727.

== Marriage and children ==
The Emperor gave him a young heiress to wed, Sibylle of Saxe-Lauenburg. They had the following children:

1. Leopold William of Baden-Baden (1694 – 1695) Hereditary Prince of Baden-Baden, died in infancy;
2. Charlotte of Baden-Baden (1696 – 1700) died in infancy;
3. Charles Joseph of Baden-Baden (1697 – 1703) Hereditary Prince of Baden-Baden, died young;
4. Wilhelmine of Baden-Baden (1700 in Schlackenwerth – 1702 in Schlackenwerth), died in infancy;
5. Luise of Baden-Baden (1701 in Nürnberg – 1707), died young;
6. Louis George Simpert of Baden-Baden, (7 June 1702 – 22 October 1761) Margrave of Baden-Baden, married Maria Anna of Schwarzenberg, had children; married again to Maria Anna of Bavaria, no children;
7. Wilhelm Georg Simpert of Baden-Baden (1703 – 1709), died young;
8. Auguste of Baden-Baden, (10 November 1704 in Aschaffenburg – 8 August 1726 in Paris) married Louis d'Orléans, Duke of Orléans and had children.
9. Augustus George Simpert of Baden-Baden, (14 January 1706 – 21 October 1771) Margrave of Baden-Baden, married Marie Victoire d'Arenberg, no male children.

Seventeen years after the margrave's death, the only one of his daughters to survive childhood, Princess Auguste, married Louis d'Orléans, son of the infamous French Regent and, at the time of the wedding, first in the line of succession to the throne of France.

His descendant through this marriage became King Louis Philippe of the French in 1830. Louis Philippe, in turn, is the ancestor of all Belgian monarchs since Leopold II.

After the death of Louis, his widow built Schloss Favorite castle as a summer residence in memory of her husband. He was buried at the Stiftskirche in Baden-Baden.

== Ancestry ==
Ancestors of Louis William, Margrave of Baden-Baden

8. Edward Fortunatus, Margrave of Baden-Baden
4. William, Margrave of Baden-Baden
9. Maria van Eicken
2. Ferdinand Maximilian, Hereditary Prince of Baden-Baden
10. Johann Georg, Prince of Hohenzollern-Hechingen
5. Katharina Ursula of Hohenzollern-Hechingen
11. Franziska of Salm-Neufville
1. Louis William, Margrave of Baden-Baden
12. Charles Emmanuel I, Duke of Savoy
6. Thomas Francis, Prince of Carignano
13. Catalina Micaela of Austria
3. Louise of Savoy
14. Charles, Count of Soissons
7. Marie, Countess of Soissons
15. Anne de Montafié, Countess of Clermont

Louis William, Margrave of Baden-Baden House of Zähringen Born: 8 April 1655 Died: 4 January 1707
Preceded by William	Margrave of Baden-Baden; 1677–1707	Succeeded by Louis George Simpert
