= Hermann of Baden-Baden =

German general and diplomat

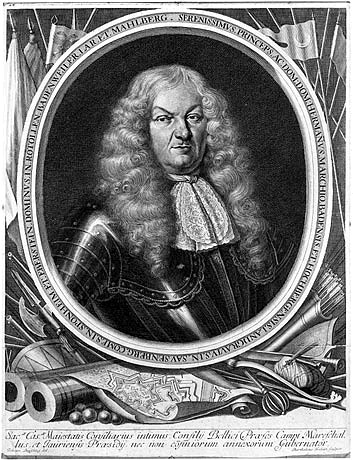
- Hermann of Baden-Baden
- Born: 12 October 1628; Regensburg
- Died: 30 October 1691 (aged 63); Baden-Baden
- Noble family: House of Zähringen
- Father: William, Margrave of Baden-Baden
- Mother: Catherine Ursula of Hohenzollern-Hechingen

Margrave (Prince) Hermann of Baden-Baden (12 October 1628 in Baden-Baden; died 30 October 1691 in Regensburg) was a general and diplomat in the imperial service. He was Field Marshal, president of the Hofkriegsrat, and the representative of the Emperor in the Perpetual Diet of Regensburg.

== Early life ==
He was the fifth son of Margrave William of Baden-Baden and his wife, Catherine Ursula of Hohenzollern-Hechingen.

He was destined for an ecclesiastical career and was appointed canon in Cologne and Paderborn. He also held seats in the cathedral chapter (religion)s of Strasbourg, Salzburg and Augsburg. He was raised as a Catholic and attended the Collegium St. Hieronymi in Dillingen. He tried in vain to join the Order of Saint John. Around 1660, he was considered a possible successor to King John II Casimir Vasa of Poland. For this reason, he gave up his seats in the cathedral chapters in 1661.

When he was not elected King of Poland, he turned to a military career. In 1663, he fought in Hungary against the Ottomans as command of the troops of the Burgundian Imperial Circle.

== War of Devolution ==
In 1665, he commanded an Austrian auxiliary force in the Spanish Netherlands, despite objections by Louis XIV.

After the War of Devolution broke out in 1667, he tried to win supporters in Germany for the Spanish cause. On behalf of the Marquis de Castrel Rodrigo, the Spanish governor, he travelled to Berlin to negotiate an alliance against France with Elector Frederick William of Brandenburg. When he appeared to have succeeded, he returned to Brussels. However, Brandenburg entered into an alliance with France in December 1667.

== Franco-Dutch War ==
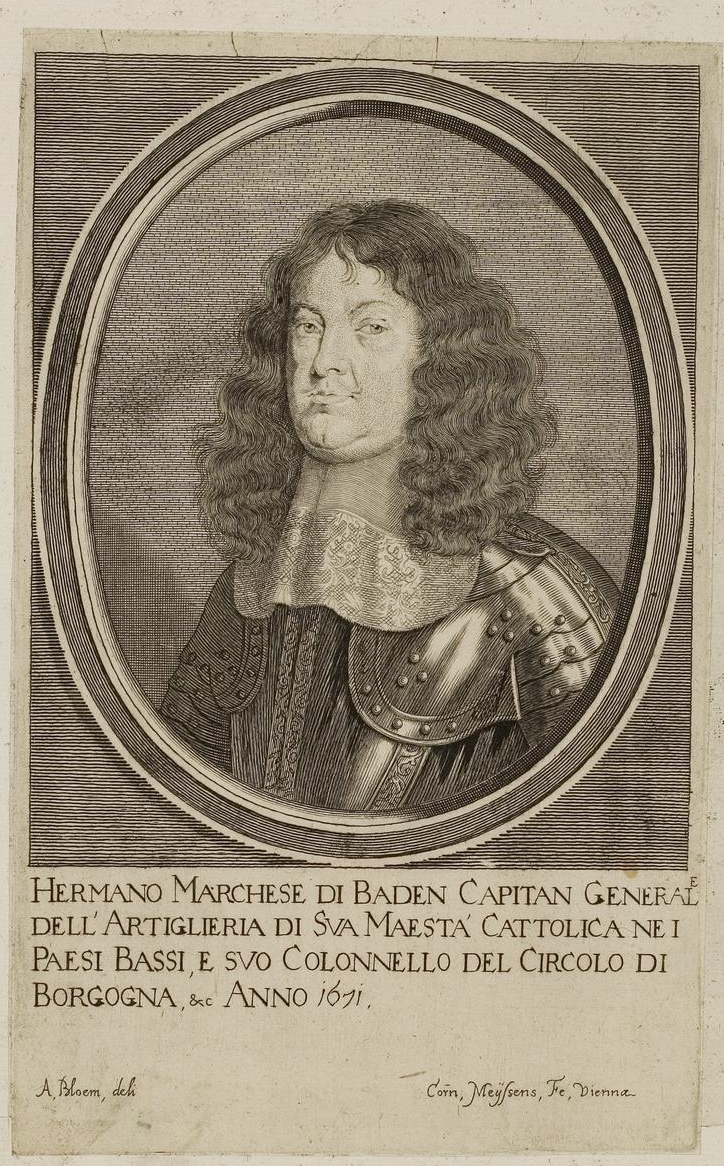
Portrait of Hermann of Baden-Baden engraved by Cornelis Meyssens

In 1671, the Franco-Dutch War was foreseeable and Hermann was significantly involved in negotiations towards an alliance between Sweden and the Holy Roman Empire. However, an agreement was prevented by court intrigues, reinforced by French bribes.

When the war broke out, he served under Raimondo Montecuccoli as Feldzeugmeister and commander of the artillery. On 4 October 1674, he fought alongside Alexander von Bournonville in the Battle of Enzheim. After they lost battles at Mulhouse on 29 December 1674 and at Turckheim on 5 January 1675, they had to retreat across the Rhine. In 1675, he defended the Breisgau. However, he could not prevent Turenne from advancing across the Rhine.

Hermann successfully defended Offenburg against a French attack led by Vauban. He then participated in the siege of Haguenau. His artillery fired at Saverne. However, Montecuccoli ordered him to break off the attack and retreat to his winter quarters.

In 1676, he fought under the command of Duke Charles V of Lorraine. Together, they were able to prevent the French from reinforcing their troops in Philippsburg. Hermann and Margrave Frederick VI of Baden-Durlach successfully besieged Philippsburg.

In 1677, he fought under Charles V again. In 1678, he was shortly commander in Strasbourg, until he was forced by illness to leave his post.

== Battle of Vienna ==
After the Treaty of Nijmegen ended the Franco-Dutch war, Hermann again acted as the Emperor's envoy to various courts. He was sent to Berlin in 1680, but had no success. In 1682, he succeeded Montecuccoli as president of the Hofkriegsrat. In 1683, he travelled to Hungary, to prepare for the Great Turkish War.

He was appointed field marshal and was an influential minister of Emperor Leopold I. He successfully argued that the garrison in Vienna should not be deployed to Hungary. When the Turkish army approached Vienna, Hermann requested permission to stay in the city. The Emperor granted him only one day, before he had to leave for Linz. During this one day, Hermann still managed to make some preparations for the defense of the city.

On 3 September 1683, he represented the Emperor in a meeting of the great council of war, with King John III Sobieski of Poland and other allies. Some of his suggestions were implemented. Charles V of Lorraine then took command of the imperial troops.

In the Battle of Vienna, he was positioned on Mount Kahlenberg, close to the King of Poland. His troops were intended as reserve troops. However, he stormed down the hill and attacked to Turkish troops frontally. He captured many trophies, which he later bequeathed to his nephew Louis William (nicknamed Türkenlouis).

== Great Turkish War ==
After the siege at Vienna, a counteroffensive started. Buda was besieged unsuccessfully. The local commanders wanted to break off the siege. At the behest of the Duke of Lorraine, the Emperor sent Hermann to Buda, where he was only able to save the remnants of the imperial army.

In 1687, Antonio Caraffa accused Hermann of making common cause with the Hungarian rebels. Hermann's nephew Louis William successfully refuted this accusation. On 9 December 1687, Hermann was present when Archduke Joseph I was crowned as King of Hungary in Bratislava. However, he was replaced as president of the Hofkriegsrat, because of his conflict with the Duke of Lorraine over the command in Hungary.

From 1688, Hermann was the principal representative of the Emperor at the Perpetual Diet in Regensburg. In 1691, he died there of a stroke. He was buried in Regensburg.
