= Herman Fortunatus, Margrave of Baden-Rodemachern =

- Born: 23 January 1595; Rastatt
- Died: 4 January 1665 (aged 69); Kastellaun
- Buried: Church of Rodemack
- Noble family: House of Zähringen
- Spouses: Antonia Elisabeth of Criechingen; Maria Sidonia of Daun-Falkenstein
- Father: Edward Fortunatus
- Mother: Maria of Eicken

Herman Fortunatus, Margrave of Baden-Rodemachern (23 January 1595 in Rastatt – 4 January 1665 in Kastellaun) was Margrave of Baden-Rodemachern. He was a son of Margrave Edward Fortunatus and Maria of Eicken (d. 21 April 1636), the daughter of Joost of Eicken and Barbara of Moll.

== Marriage and issue ==
Margrave Herman Fortunatus married his first wife on 18 April 1627. She was Antonia Elisabeth (d. 12 January 1635), a daughter of Count Christopher of Criechingen. They had three children:

- Charles William (1627-1666), a canon of Cologne, and the last Margrave of Baden-Rodemachern
- Leopold (1628-1635)
- Maria Sidonia (1635 – 15 August 1686), married on 12 November 1662 to Prince Philip of Hohenzollern-Hechingen (1601 – 13 January 1671)

Margrave Herman Fortunates then married his second wife. She was Maria Sidonia of Daun-Falkenstein (1605-1675), the daughter of Count Philip Francis of Falkenstein. They had two children:

- Philip Balthasar (d. 1662)
- Maria Eleonora Sophia (d. 18 April 1668), married in 1665 to Count John Francis Desideratus of Nassau-Siegen (28 July 1627 – 17 December 1699)

== Ancestors ==
Ancestors of Herman Fortunatus, Margrave of Baden-Rodemachern

16. Christopher I, Margrave of Baden-Baden
8. Bernhard III, Margrave of Baden-Baden
17. Ottilie of Katzenelnbogen
4. Christopher II, Margrave of Baden-Rodemachern
18. Charles I, Count of Ligny
9. Françoise of Luxembourg-Ligny
19. Charlotte of Estouteville
2. Edward Fortunatus
20. Erik Johansson Vasa
10. Gustav I of Sweden
21. Cecilia Månsdotter
5. Princess Cecilia of Sweden
22. Erik Abrahamsson Leijonhufvud
11. Margareta Leijonhufvud
23. Ebba Eriksdotter Vasa
1. Herman Fortunatus, Margrave of Baden-Rodemachern
24. Henry V of Eicken
12. Johan of Eicken
25. Barbara Gertruid of Volxen-Stalle
6. Joost of Eicken
26. Gabriel of Offhuys
13. Barbara of Offhuys
27. Barbara of Ginderhoven
3. Maria of Eicken
28. Caspar of Moll
14. Martin of Moll
29. Anna of Hochforst-Grimbergen
7. Barbara of Moll
30. Johey of Olmen
15. Anna of Olmen
31. Catherine of Ginderhoven

== See also ==
- List of rulers of Baden

Herman Fortunatus, Margrave of Baden-Rodemachern House of Zähringen Born: 23 January 1595 Died: 4 January 1665
Preceded by Philip III	Margrave of Baden-Rodemachern; 1620-1665	Succeeded by Charles William
