= Joseph Albrier =

French painter (1791–1863)

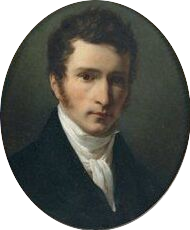
Self-portrait of Albrier

Gilles Marie Joseph Albrier (4 October 1791 – March 1863) was a French painter who specialised in portrait painting. He was a student of Jean-Baptiste Regnault. He exhibited at the Salon in 1819, 1822, 1824, 1827 and 1836.

== Gallery ==
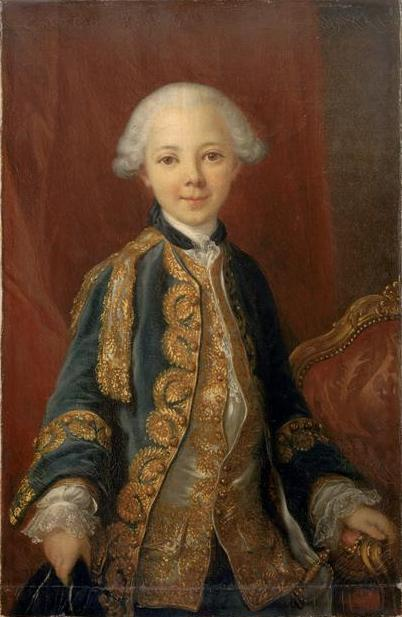
Jean Marie, Duke of Châteauvillain

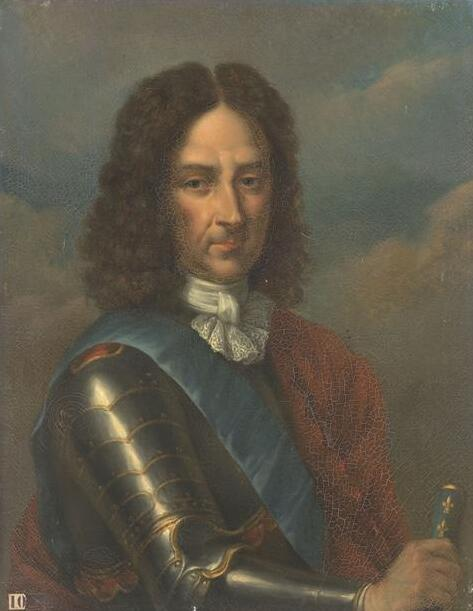
Bernardin Gigault de Bellefonds

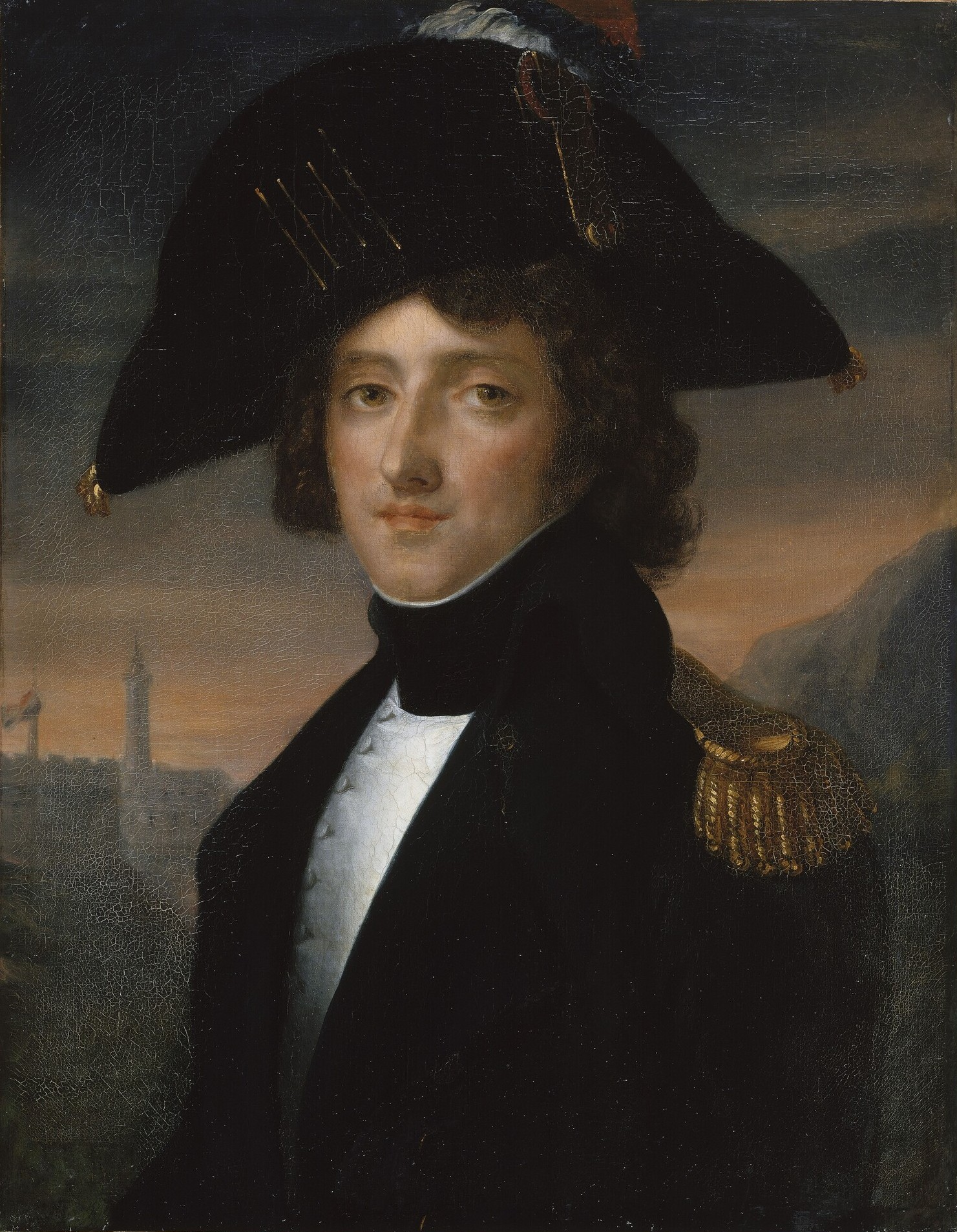
Louis-Gabriel Suchet

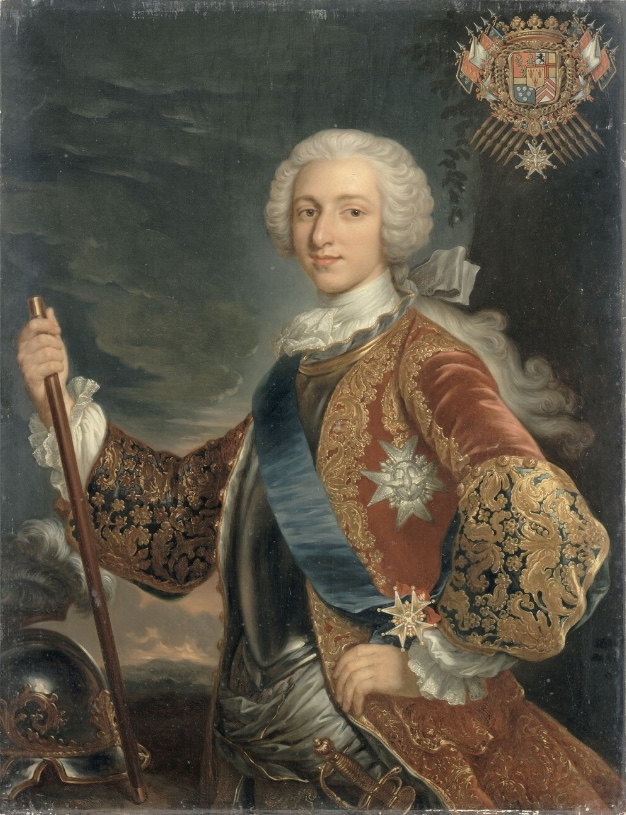
Anne-Louis de Thiard de Bissy

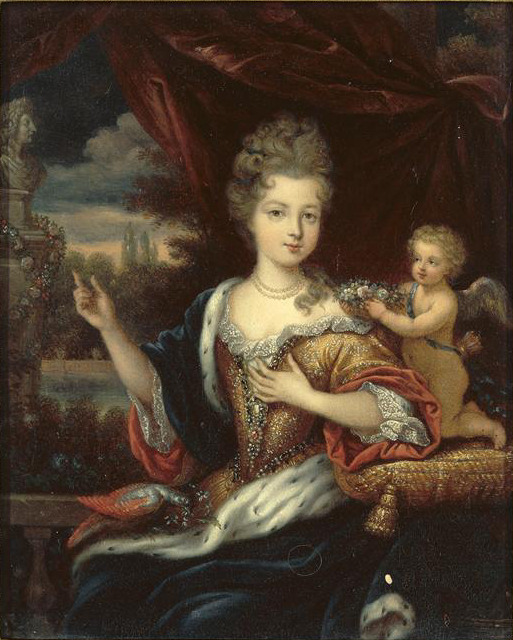
Louise Françoise, Princess of Condé
