= Princess Louise of Savoy =

Hereditary Princess of Baden-Baden (1627–1689)

Princess Louise
- Hereditary Princess of Baden-Baden
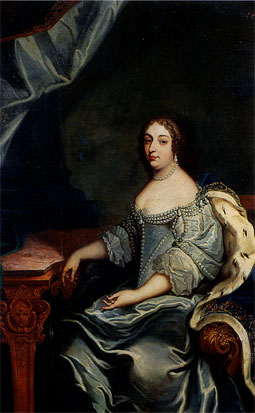
- Portrait, c. 1654/1655
- Born: 1 August 1627; Hôtel de Soissons, Paris, France
- Died: 7 July 1689 (aged 61); Paris, France
- Spouse: Ferdinand Maximilian, Hereditary Prince of Baden-Baden (m. 1653; died 1669)
- Issue: Louis, Margrave of Baden-Baden
Names
- French: Louise Christine de Savoie; Italian: Luisa Cristina di Savoia
- House: House of Savoy (by birth); House of Zähringen (by marriage)
- Father: Thomas Francis, Prince of Carignano
- Mother: Marie de Bourbon

Louise of Savoy (Louise Christine; 1 August 1627 – 7 July 1689) was a Savoyard Princess by birth. She became by marriage Margravine of Baden-Baden, consort to Ferdinand Maximilian, heir apparent of Baden-Baden, and the mother of Louis, Margrave of Baden-Baden, the famous chief commander of the Imperial army. She served as a lady-in-waiting to the queen of France and lived most of her life at the French royal court.

== Biography ==
Louise was born at the Hôtel de Soissons in Paris. The Hôtel was the birthplace of her mother, a granddaughter of Louis de Bourbon, an uncle of Henry IV of France. Her father was Prince Thomas Francis of Savoy, the younger son of the Duke of Savoy and his Spanish wife, Infanta Catalina Micaela. Prior to her marriage, she served as maid of honour to the queen dowager regent of France, Anne of Austria.

She married Margrave Ferdinand Maximilian of Baden-Baden (1625–1669) on 15 March 1653 at the Église Saint-Sulpice, Paris, France. The church was near the Hôtel de Soissons. The marriage contract was signed on the same day and is today preserved in the Parisian Institut de France. This marriage was negotiated by none other than the famous Cardinal Mazarin and the Ambassador of the Margrave of Baden-Baden one Monsieur Krebs. Her husband was the Hereditary Prince of Baden-Baden, this meant that he was the Heir apparent of his father Wilhelm, Margrave of Baden-Baden.

Marriages between German and Savoyard nobles were common in an era when many Savoyard nobles lived in German states notably Baden itself, due to official charges in the country.

The marriage was not successful. Louise Christine of Savoy refused to leave the refined French court and follow her husband to Baden-Baden: she served as Dame du Palais to the queen of France between 1664 and 1673. Louise Christine gave birth to a son on April 8, 1655, named Louis William of Baden-Baden. He was named after the French King Louis XIV, who was his godfather.

Ferdinand Maximilian then abducted his son from Paris and brought him to Baden-Baden. Ferdinand ordered a Savoyard man named Charles Maurice de Lassolaye, who had access to the Hôtel de Soissons, to smuggle his three-month-old son out of Paris and take him to be raised in Baden-Baden. As a consequence Louis William was not raised by his mother, but by his grandfather's second wife Maria Magdalena of Oettingen-Baldern. Her son had been abducted in order to force his mother to leave the French court and join her husband in France; her refusal to do so caused a scandal, but she refused to leave France even when she was (temporarily) banned from attenting the royal court in 1668.

When it was clear that Louise Christine would not leave Paris, some said due to the influence of her mother, Louise Christine and her husband decided to separate and let her son be raised in Baden-Baden. She reportedly received the news of her husband's death in 1669 with indifference. She remained at the royal French court as a widow. In 1684 however she supported the marriage between Emmanuel-Philibert of Savoyen-Carignan and Maria Angela Caterina d’Este against the will of Louis XIV and the king therefore banished her from the royal court and the capital of Paris until 1688.

She died in Paris aged 61.

Her descendants included the present Henri d'Orléans, French pretender; the Prince Napoléon; Duarte Pio, Duke of Braganza and his distant cousin Prince Luiz of Orléans-Braganza. She is also an ancestor of the ruling Felipe VI of Spain, Henri, Grand Duke of Luxembourg and Albert II of Belgium.

== Ancestors ==
Ancestors of Princess Louise of Savoy

8. Emmanuel Philibert, Duke of Savoy
4. Charles Emmanuel I, Duke of Savoy
9. Margaret, Duchess of Berry
2. Thomas Francis, Prince of Carignano
10. Philip II of Spain
5. Catalina Micaela of Austria
11. Elisabeth of Valois
1. Louise of Savoy
12. Louis de Bourbon, Prince of Condé
6. Charles de Bourbon, Count of Soissons
13. Françoise d'Orléans-Longueville
3. Marie de Bourbon, Countess of Soissons
14. Louis de Montafié, Count of Montafié
7. Anne de Montafié, Countess of Clermont
15. Jeanne de Coesme, Lady of Lucé and Bonnétable
