= Katharina Ursula of Hohenzollern-Hechingen =

First wife of Margrave William of Baden-Baden (1610–1640)

Catherine Ursula of Hohenzollern-Hechingen
- Born: 1610
- Died: 2 June 1640; Baden-Baden
- Noble family: House of Hohenzollern
- Spouse: William, Margrave of Baden-Baden
- Father: John George, Prince of Hohenzollern-Hechingen
- Mother: Francisca of Salm-Neufville

Princess Katharina Ursula of Hohenzollern-Hechingen (also Catherine Ursula of Hohenzollern-Hechingen) (1610 – 2 June 1640 in Baden-Baden) was margravine of Baden-Baden. She was the daughter of Johann Georg, Prince of Hohenzollern-Hechingen and his wife, Countess Franziska von Salm-Dhaun.

She was the first wife of Margrave William of Baden-Baden. From her marriage, she had the following children:

- Ferdinand Maximilian (23 September 1625 in Baden-Baden – 4 November 1669 in Heidelberg), Hereditary Prince of Baden-Baden
- Leopold Wilhelm (16 September 1626 – 23 February 1671 in Baden-Baden), imperial field marshal
- Philip Siegmund (born 25 August 1627 – died 1647, killed in battle)
- William Christopher (12 October 1628 in Baden-Baden – 25 August 1652)
- Hermann (12 October 1628 Baden-Baden – 2 October 1691)
- Bernard (22 October 1629 – 1648 in Rome)
- Francis (1637–1637)
- Isabella Clara Eugenie (14 November 1630 – 1632)
- Catherine Francisca Henriette (19 November 1631 – August 1691 in Besançon)
- Claudia (born 15 May 1633)
- Henriette (born 12 July 1634)
- Anna (12 July 1634 – 31 March 1708 in Baden-Baden)
- Maria (1636–1636)
- Maria Juliana (1638–1638)

Vacant Title last held by Maria van Eicken	Margravine consort of Baden-Baden; 1624–1640	Vacant Title next held by Maria Magdalena of Oettingen-Baldern
