= Maria van Eicken =

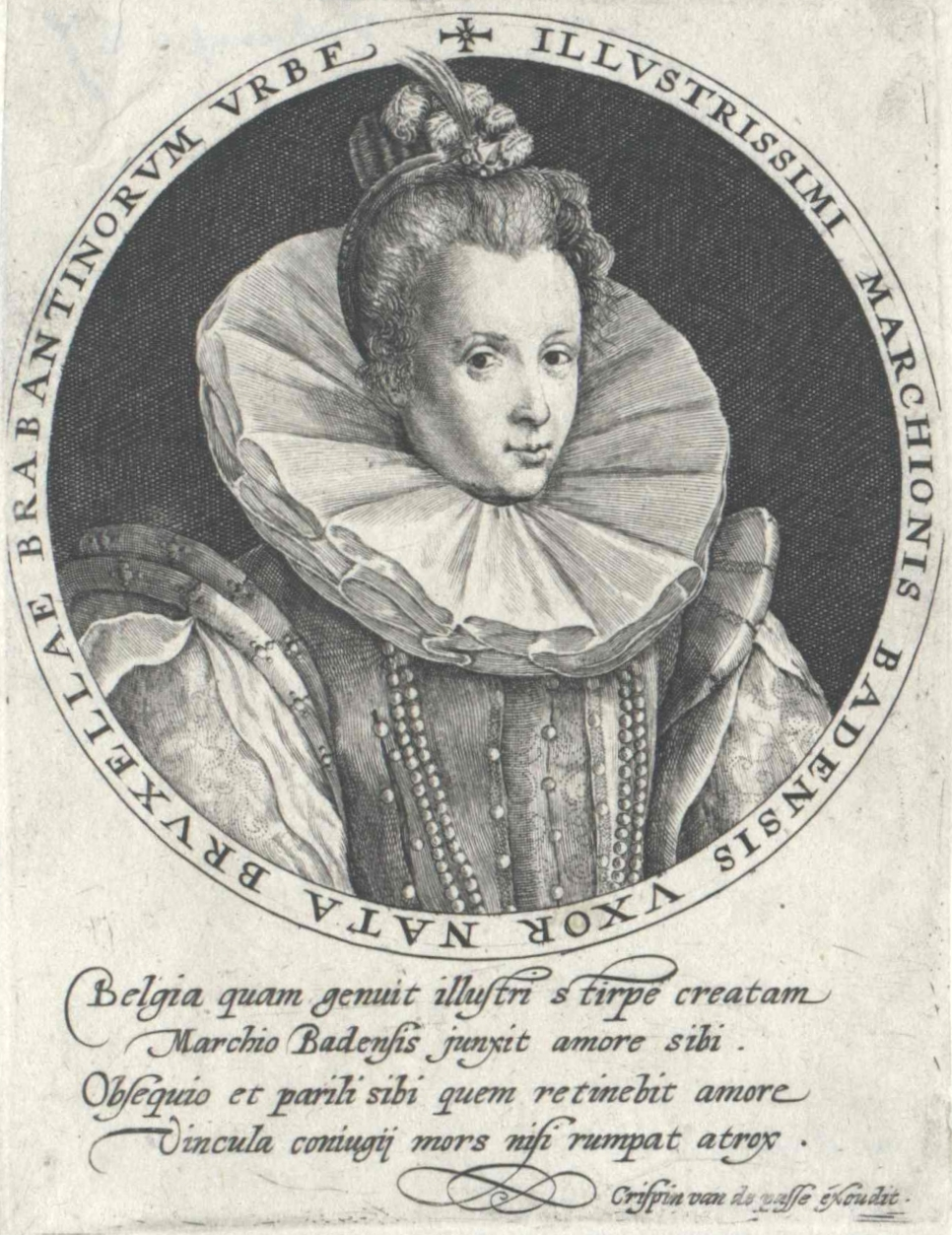
- Born: 1571; Brussels
- Died: 21 April 1636; Porta Angelica Monastery, Flaumbach Valley, near Treis-Karden
- Noble family: van der Eycken
- Spouse: Edward Fortunatus
- Father: Joost van der Eycken
- Mother: Barbara of Moll

Maria van der Eycken, Lady of Rivieren (1571 in Brussels – 21 April 1636 in Porta Angelica Monastery, Flaumbach Valley, near Treis-Karden) was the wife of the Margrave Edward Fortunatus of Baden-Baden.

== Early life ==
She was born in Brussels as the daughter of Joost van der Eycken, Lord of the Nederloo and Rivieren, Governor of the city of Breda (d. 1591), and his wife, Barbara de Mol (d. 1596), daughter of Martin de Mol, Grand Falconer of the King of Spain in the Spanish Netherlands.

== Biography ==
On 13 March 1591 in Brussels, she married Margrave Edward Fortunatus of Baden-Baden. As she was not a member of the high nobility, she was not considered a befitting wife for a margrave and their children were never accepted as relatives by his cousin Margrave Ernest Frederick of Baden-Durlach. Nevertheless, their son William would inherit Baden-Baden.

Marie and Edward Fortunatus had the following children:

- William (1593–1677)
- Hermann Fortunatus (1595–1665)
- Charles Albert (born 1598 in Kastellaun – died 1626 at Hundschloss Castle, when he accidentally shot himself)
- Anna Marie Lucretia (born 1592 Murano – died 1654 in Kastellaun)

Vacant Title last held by Princess Cecilia of Sweden	Margravine consort of Baden-Baden; 1591–1596	Vacant Title next held by Catherine Ursula of Hohenzollern-Hechingen
