= Edward Fortunatus =

German nobleman

Edward Fortunatus of Baden
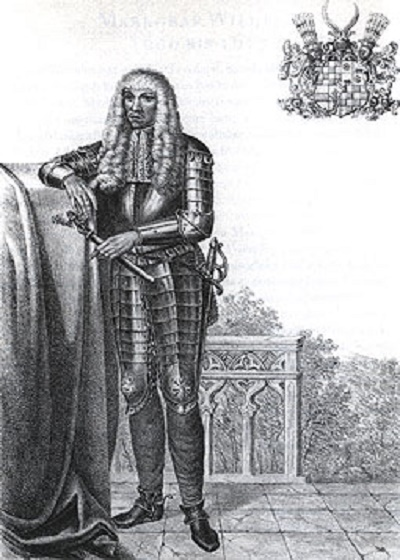
- Engraving of Edward Fortunatus, Margrave of Baden-Rodemachern
- Born: 17 September 1565; London
- Died: 8 June 1600 (aged 34); Castle Kastellaun
- Noble family: House of Zähringen
- Spouse: Maria van der Eicken
- Issue: Anna Maria Lukretia; William; Hermann Fortunatus; Albrecht Karl of Baden-Baden
- Father: Christopher II, Margrave of Baden-Rodemachern
- Mother: Cecilia Vasa, Princess of Sweden

Edward Fortunatus (or in German Eduard Fortunat) of Baden (17 September 1565 – 8 June 1600) was Margrave of Baden-Rodemachern and Baden-Baden.

== Life and work ==
Born in London, Edward was the son of Christopher II, Margrave of Baden-Rodemachern and Swedish Princess Cecilia Vasa. He received his name from Queen Elizabeth I of England, who was his godmother. He spent his first year at Hampton Court Palace, England.

When his father died in 1575, he became the Margrave of Baden-Rodemachern. His guardian, Duke William V of Bavaria, gave him a Catholic upbringing and in 1584 he converted from Lutheranism to Catholicism, as his mother had already done.

The strife between Catholics and Protestants divided Edward's family, and on 18 November 1589 he hosted a colloquy in the Town Hall at Baden to discuss the relative claims of Catholicism (represented by Johann Pistorius), Lutheranism (represented by Andreä and Jacob Heerbrand), and Calvinism, represented by Schyrius, but it caused only a hardening of viewpoints.

On 13 March 1591 in Brussels, he made a non-church marriage with Maria van der Eicken (1569 – 21 April 1636), daughter of Joost van der Eycken, the Governor of Breda, which he regularised only on 14 May 1593, after she had borne him a daughter. They ultimately had four children but due in part to his wife's lesser antecedents they were never recognised as his heirs by Ernest Frederick, Margrave of Baden-Durlach, who succeeded him.

In 1587, he visited his relatives in Sweden, and accompanied his cousin Sigismund III Vasa, King of the Polish–Lithuanian Commonwealth (and also later King of Sweden) to Poland and in 1588 was appointed by him to head the Polish customs and mines. The same year, he inherited Baden-Baden, reuniting it with Baden-Rodemachern. However, he treated the Lutherans harshly and squandered the resources of the territory, and his marriage and children were not approved of by his relatives. In 1594, therefore, a relative, Ernest Frederick, Margrave of Baden-Durlach, took over the whole of Baden-Baden. (Edward's sons were only reinstated in 1622 after the Battle of Wimpfen, when their Catholicism gave them an advantage.)

Edward inherited debts from his parents and aggravated them. After losing his margravate, he lived in various castles and attempted to raise money by coining money, alchemy and black magic, bringing Paul Pestalozzi of Clavella and Mascarello of Chio from Padua to assist him, and succeeded in causing pain to Ernest Frederick by sticking pins in a wax effigy. He is also reported as having sought to have Ernest Frederick killed by poisoning. He also supposedly seduced and caused the death of the daughter of his castellan at the Yburg, which is now ruined and haunted by her ghost.

In 1597, he was sent to Germany to recruit mercenaries on behalf of the Government of Spain. In 1598, he participated in his cousin Sigismund's attempt to regain Sweden from his uncle Charles IX and in the Battle of Stångebro. Edward was captured and briefly imprisoned by the Danes.

He died in 1600 at Castle Kastellaun as a result of falling down a stone staircase, possibly while drunk.

== Children ==
- Anna Maria Lukretia (1592–1654)
- William (1593–1677), later the Margrave of Baden
- Hermann Fortunatus (1595–1665)
- Albrecht Karl of Baden-Baden (1598–1626)
