= Ferdinand Maximilian, Hereditary Prince of Baden-Baden =

Prince of Baden-Baden

Ferdinand Maximilian
- Hereditary Prince of Baden-Baden
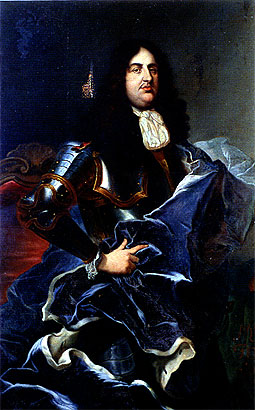
- Ferdinand Maximilian, 1654 or 1655
- Born: 23 September 1625; Baden-Baden
- Died: 4 November 1669 (aged 44); Heidelberg
- Noble family: House of Zähringen
- Spouse: Princess Louise Christine of Savoy
- Issue: Louis William, Margrave of Baden-Baden
- Father: William, Margrave of Baden-Baden
- Mother: Catharina Ursula of Hohenzollern–Hechingen

Ferdinand Maximilian of Baden-Baden, Hereditary Prince of Baden-Baden (23 September 1625 – 4 November 1669) was the father of the famous general Louis William, Margrave of Baden-Baden.

Born in Baden-Baden, he was the oldest son of William, Margrave of Baden-Baden and Catharina Ursula of Hohenzollern–Hechingen. Ferdinand Maximilian of Baden was destined to follow in his father's footsteps as Margrave of Baden-Baden, but he died before his father in a hunting accident.

Ferdinand Maximilian married in Paris in 1653 Princess Louise of Savoy (1627–1689), aunt of Prince Eugene of Savoy.

The marriage was not successful. Louise Christine of Savoy refused to leave the refined French court and follow her husband to Baden-Baden. Ferdinand Maximilian then abducted his son from Paris and brought him to Baden-Baden. As a consequence Louis William was not raised by his mother, but by his grandfather's second wife Maria Magdalena of Oettingen-Baldern.
