= William, Margrave of Baden-Baden =

Ruler of Baden-Baden between 1621 and 1677

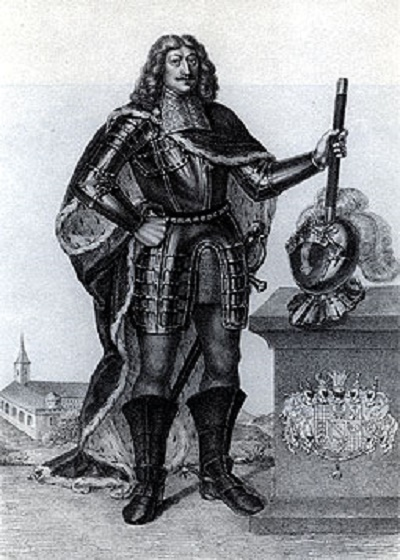
- William, Margrave of Baden-Baden
- Born: 30 July 1593; Baden-Baden
- Died: 22 May 1677 (aged 83); Baden-Baden
- Noble family: House of Zähringen
- Spouses: Catherine Ursula of Hohenzollern-Hechingen; Maria Magdalena of Oettingen-Baldern
- Issue: first marriage Ferdinand Maximilian Leopold Wilhelm William Christopher Philipp Siegmund Hermann Bernhard Isabella Eugenie Klara Catharina Franziska Henriette Claudia Henriette Anna Maria Francis Maria Juliane * second marriage Philipp Franz Wilhelm Maria Anna Wilhelmine Karl Bernhard Eva Maria
- Father: Margrave Edward Fortunatus
- Mother: Gräfin Maria of Eicken

Margrave William of Baden-Baden (30 July 1593 – 22 May 1677) was the ruler of Baden-Baden between 1621 and 1677.

== Life ==
Born in Baden-Baden, he was the eldest son of Margrave Edward Fortunatus of Baden and Maria of Eicken. He was Geheimrat, Generalfeldmarschall and Imperial Kammerrichter of Speyer, which gave him his nickname: Wilhelm der Kammerrichter. Wilhelm was also a Knight in the Order of the Golden Fleece.

He raised his grandson and successor Ludwig Wilhelm.

Wilhelm only received the Regency of Baden after the victory of Johann Tserclaes, Count of Tilly in the Battle of Wimpfen over Georg Friedrich, Margrave of Baden-Durlach, whose brother Ernst Friedrich had occupied Baden-Baden in 1594.

During the Regency of Wilhelm, Baden suffered from a terrible witch-hunt. Between 1626 and 1631, some 244 people, mostly women, were charged and 231 were condemned and burned in the Baden-Baden witch trials.

In 1631, Wilhelm lost Baden to the Swedish General Gustav Horn and regained control only after the Peace of Prague (1635) and the Peace of Westphalia on 24 October 1648. During this fighting, Wilhelm was taken prisoner, but not recognized and released as an ordinary soldier.

He died in Baden-Baden in 1677.

== Family ==
First marriage: Wilhelm married on 13 October 1624 Princess Catherine Ursula of Hohenzollern-Hechingen (died 2 June 1640), daughter of Count John George of Hohenzollern-Hechingen.

- Ferdinand Maximilian (1625–1669), father of the famous general Louis William, Margrave of Baden-Baden.
- Leopold Wilhelm (1626–1671), Imperial field marshal
- Philipp Siegmund (1627–1647), Knight Hospitaller
- William Christopher (1628–1652), Canon at Cologne
- Hermann (1628–1691)
- Bernhard (1629–1648)
- Isabella Eugenie Klara (1630–1632)
- Catharina Franziska Henriette (1631–1691), a nun
- Claudia (1633–1633)
- Henriette (1634–1634)
- Anna (1634–1708)
- Maria (1636–1636)
- Francis (1637–1637)
- Maria Juliane (1638–1638)

Second marriage: Wilhelm I married in 1650 Countess Maria Magdalena of Oettingen-Baldern (1619–31 August 1688), daughter of Count Ernst of Oettingen-Baldern.

- Philipp Franz Wilhelm (1652–1655)
- Maria Anna Wilhelmine (1655–1701), married Ferdinand August, Prince of Lobkowicz
- Karl Bernhard (1657–1678), KIA at Rheinfelden
- Eva
- Maria

== Ancestors ==
Ancestors of William, Margrave of Baden-Baden

16. Christopher I, Margrave of Baden-Baden
8. Bernhard III, Margrave of Baden-Baden
17. Ottilie of Katzenelnbogen
4. Christopher II, Margrave of Baden-Rodemachern
18. Charles I, Count of Ligny
9. Françoise of Ligny
19. Charlotte d'Estouteville
2. Edward Fortunatus
20. Erik Johansson Vasa
10. Gustav I of Sweden
21. Cecilia Månsdotter
5. Princess Cecilia of Sweden
22. Erik Abrahamsson Leijonhufvud
11. Margareta Leijonhufvud
23. Ebba Eriksdotter Vasa
1. William, Margrave of Baden-Baden
24. Henry of Eicken
12. Graf Jan of Eicken
25. Barbe Volcxem
6. Joost, Graf of Eicken
26. Gabriel of Offhusen
13. Barbara of Offhusen
27. Barbara of Ginderhoven
3. Gräfin Maria of Eicken
28. Kaspar of Moll
14. Martin of Moll
29. Anna of Hochforst-Grimbergen
7. Gräfin Barbara of Moll
30. Johey of Olmen
15. Anna of Olmen
31. Catherine of Ginderhoven

William, Margrave of Baden-Baden House of Zähringen Born: 30 July 1593 Died: 22 May 1677
Preceded by Edward Fortunatus	Margrave of Baden-Baden; 1596–1677	Succeeded by Louis William
