= Baden-Baden (electoral district) =

State electoral district of Germany

33: Baden-Baden
- Electoral district for the Landtag of Baden-Württemberg
- Baden-Baden in 2026
- District: Baden-Baden and Rastatt (partial)
- Electorate: 90,225 (2026)
- Major settlements: Baden-Baden, Bühl, Bühlertal, Hügelsheim, Lichtenau, Ottersweier, Rheinmünster, and Sinzheim

Current electoral district
- Party: CDU
- Member: Cornelia von Loga

Baden-Baden is an electoral constituency (German: Wahlkreis) represented in the Landtag of Baden-Württemberg.

Since 2026, it has elected one member via first-past-the-post voting. Voters cast a second vote under which additional seats are allocated proportionally state-wide. Under the constituency numbering system, it is designated as constituency 33.

It is split between the city of Baden-Baden and the district of Rastatt.

== Geography ==
The constituency incorporates the entirety of the city of Baden-Baden, and the districts of Bühl, Bühlertal, Hügelsheim, Lichtenau, Ottersweier, Rheinmünster, and Sinzheim within the district of Rastatt.

There were 90,225 eligible voters in 2026.

== Members ==
=== First mandate ===
Both prior to and since the electoral reforms for the 2026 election, the winner of the plurality of the vote (first-past-the-post) in every constituency won the first mandate.

Election	Member	Party	%
1976	Egon Gushurst	CDU	
1980	Egon Gushurst	CDU	
1984	Egon Gushurst	CDU	
1988	Ulrich Wendt	CDU	
1992	Ursula Lazarus	CDU	
1996	Ursula Lazarus	CDU	
2001	Ursula Lazarus	CDU	51.3
2006	Ursula Lazarus	CDU	48.5
2011	Tobias Wald	CDU	43.2
2016	Beate Böhlen	Grüne	32.7
Nov 2019	Hans-Peter Behrens	Grüne	32.7
2021	Hans-Peter Behrens	Grüne	32.6
2026	Cornelia von Loga	CDU	37.0

=== Second mandate ===
Prior to the electoral reforms for the 2026 election, the seats in the state parliament were allocated proportionately amongst parties which received more than 5% of valid votes across the state. The seats that were won proportionally for parties that did not win as many first mandates as seats they were entitled to, were allocated to their candidates which received the highest proportion of the vote in their respective constituencies. This meant that following some elections, a constituency would have one or more members elected under a second mandate.

Prior to 2011, these second mandates were allocated to the party candidates who got the greatest number of votes, whilst from 2011-2021, these were allocated according to percentage share of the vote.

Prior to 2011, this constituency did not elect any members on a second mandate.

Election	Member	Party
2011	Beate Böhlen	Grüne
2016	Tobias Wald	CDU
2021	Tobias Wald	CDU
Dec 2023	Cornelia von Loga	CDU

== Election results ==
=== 2026 election ===
State election (2026): Bade-Baden
Notes:	Blue background denotes the winner of the electorate vote. Pink background denotes a candidate elected from their party list. Yellow background denotes an electorate win by a list member, or other incumbent. A ✓ or ✗ denotes status of any incumbent, win or lose respectively.						
Party	Candidate	Votes	%	±%	Party votes	%	±%
CDU	Cornelia von Loga	21,936	37.0	▲9.3	19,544	32.9	▲5.1
Greens	Joachim Heck	13,058	22.1	▼10.6	17,663	29.7	▼2.9
AfD	Kurt Hermann	10,831	18.3	▲9.4	10,907	18.4	▲9.5
SPD	Emile Yadjo-Scheuerer	6,297	10.6	▼0.5	3,004	5.1	▼6.0
FW	Jennifer Lehoux-Wäldele	2,509	4.2	▲0.4	1,390	2.3	▼1.5
FDP	Karl-Georg Degenhardt	2,075	3.5	▼5.3	2,424	4.1	▼4.7
Left	Lothar Tatzik	1,946	3.3	▲0.6	1,945	3.3	▲0.6
APT					646	1.1	
BSW					601	1.0	
Volt	Beate Ando	556	{{{percentage}}}	▲0.4	376	0.6	▲0.1
dieBasis					187	0.3	▼1.9
PARTEI					180	0.3	
Values					122	0.2	
Pensioners					109	0.2	
Bündnis C					70	0.1	
ÖDP					62	0.1	▼0.6
Team Todenhöfer					55	0.1	
Verjüngungsforschung					43	0.1	
PdF					33	0.1	
Humanists					23	0.0	
KlimalisteBW					18	0.0	▼0.9
Informal votes		633			439		
Total valid votes		59,208			59,402		
Turnout		59,841	66.3	▲2.9			
CDU gain from Greens	Majority	8,878	14.9				

=== 2021 election ===
State election (2021): Baden-Baden
Party	Candidate	Votes	%	±%
Greens	Hans-Peter Behrens	18,669	32.6	▼0.1
CDU	Tobias Wald	15,874	27.8	▼1.5
SPD	Emile Yadjo-Scheuerer	6,348	11.1	▲1.1
AfD	Kurt Hermann	5,081	8.9	▼5.6
FDP	René Lohs	5,029	8.8	▲0.3
FW	Thomas Schindler	2,202	3.9	
Left	Beate Schneider	1,523	2.7	▲0.3
dieBasis	Ralf Baßler	1,255	2.2	
KlimalisteBW	Günther Beikert	507	0.9	
ÖDP	Marcel Friedmann	375	0.7	▼0.1
Volt	Robin Gscheidle	321	0.6	
Majority		2,795	4.8	
Rejected ballots		385	0.7	▼0.2
Turnout		57,569	63.4	▼5.2
Registered electors		90,818		
Greens hold		Swing		

== See also ==
- Politics of Baden-Württemberg
- Landtag of Baden-Württemberg
