= Margraviate of Baden-Baden =

Territory within the Holy Roman Empire (1535–1771)

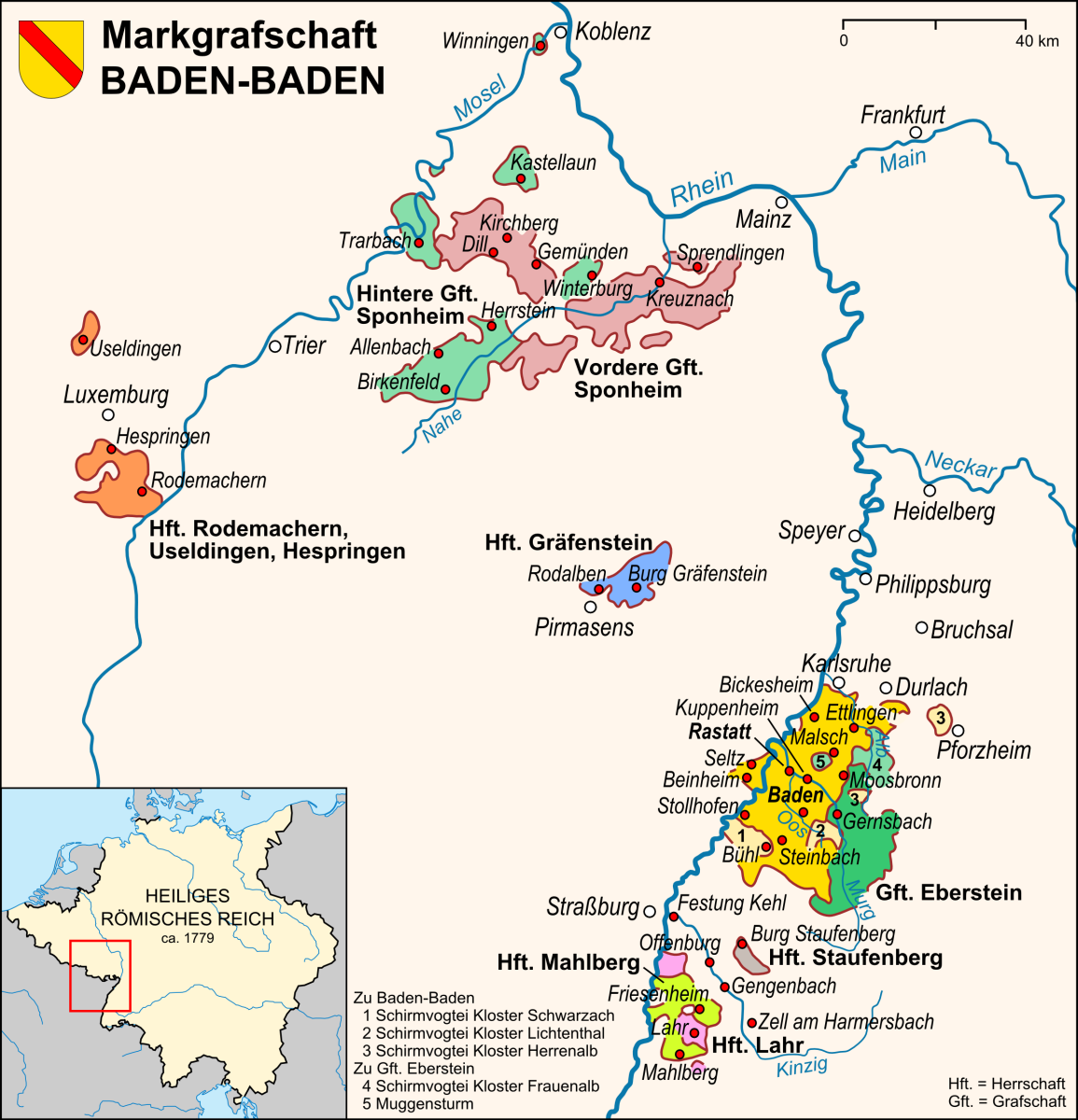
Map of the Margraviate of Baden-Baden

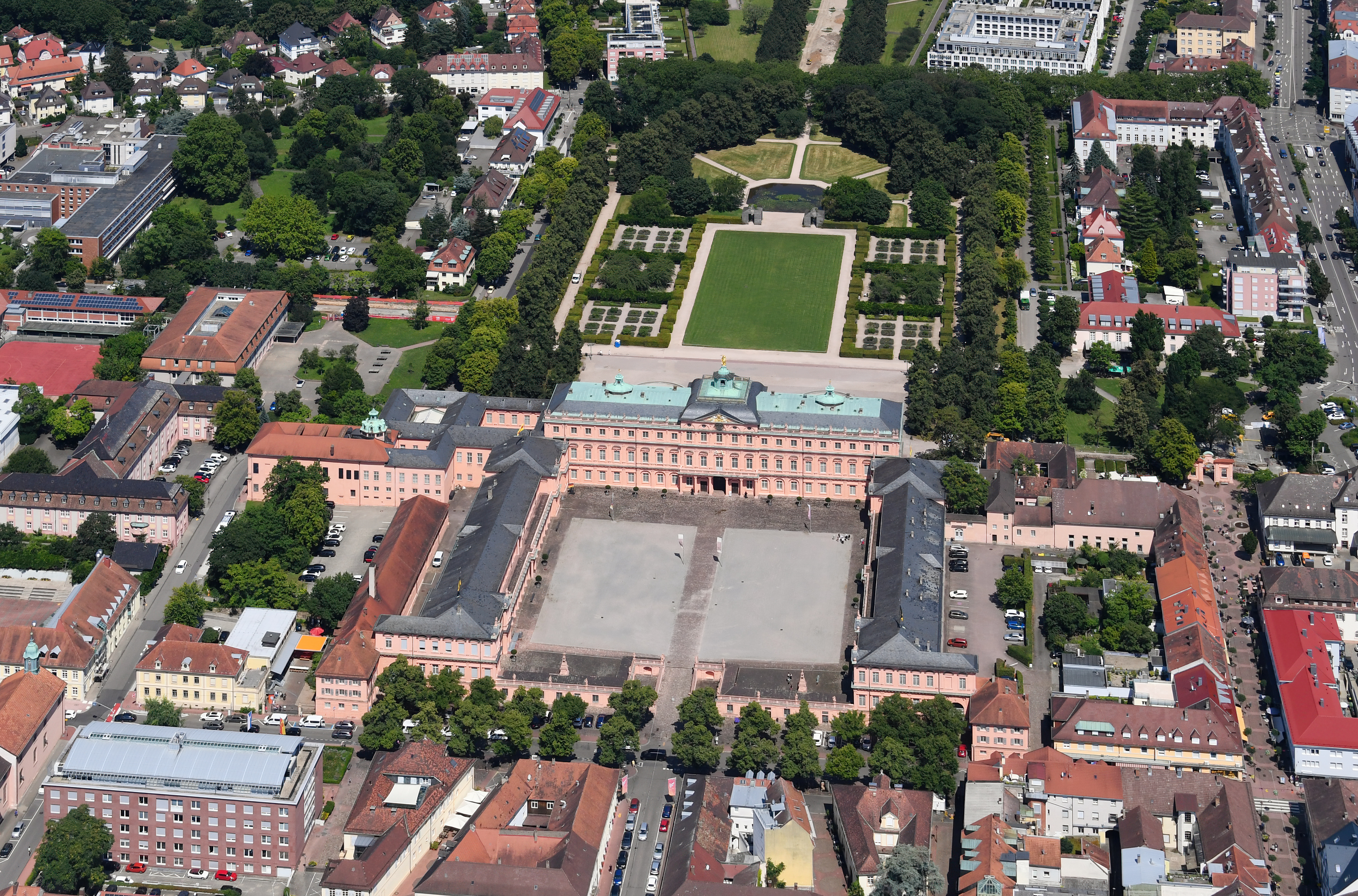
Schloss Rastatt, the palace of the margraves in the 18th century

The Margraviate of Baden-Baden was an early modern southwest German territory within the Holy Roman Empire. It was created in 1535 along with the Margraviate of Baden-Durlach as a result of the division of the Margraviate of Baden. Its territory consisted of a core area on the middle stretch of the Upper Rhine around the capital city of Baden, as well as lordships on the Moselle and Nahe.

While Protestantism took hold in Baden-Durlach, Baden-Baden was Catholic from the Thirty Years' War (1618–1648) onwards. After the complete destruction of the territory in the Nine Years' War (1688–1697), Margrave Louis William, the "Turkishlouis", moved the capital to Rastatt and built Schloss Rastatt there, the first baroque palace on the Upper Rhine. Under the regency of his widow, Sibylle of Saxe-Lauenburg, further baroque structures were built. When her second son Augustus George died without heirs in 1771, Baden-Baden was inherited by the rulers of Baden-Durlach, reuniting the two margraviates.

== Territory ==
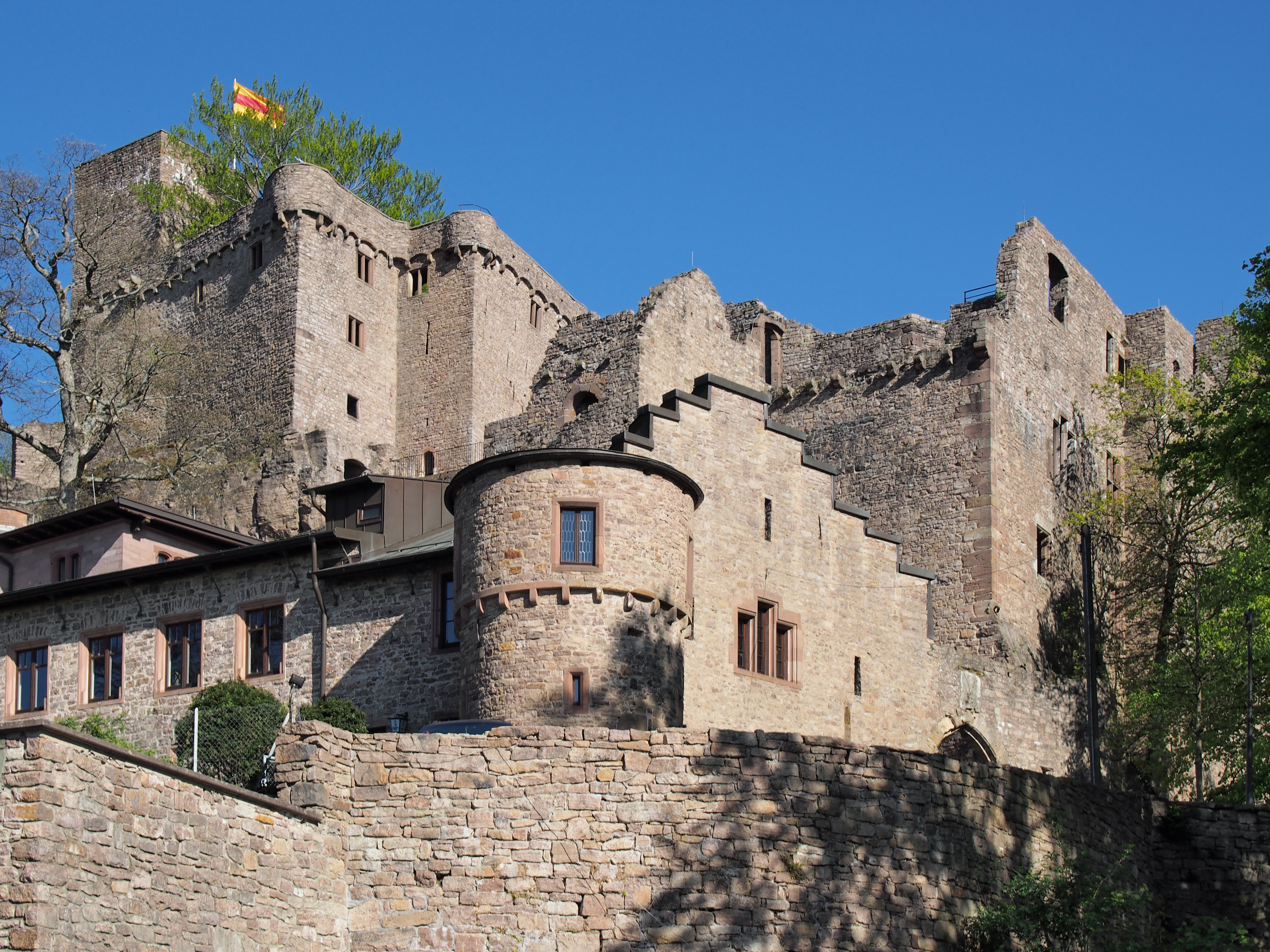
Ruins of Schloss Hohenbaden above Baden-Baden, the "old castle" and original seat of the house of Baden

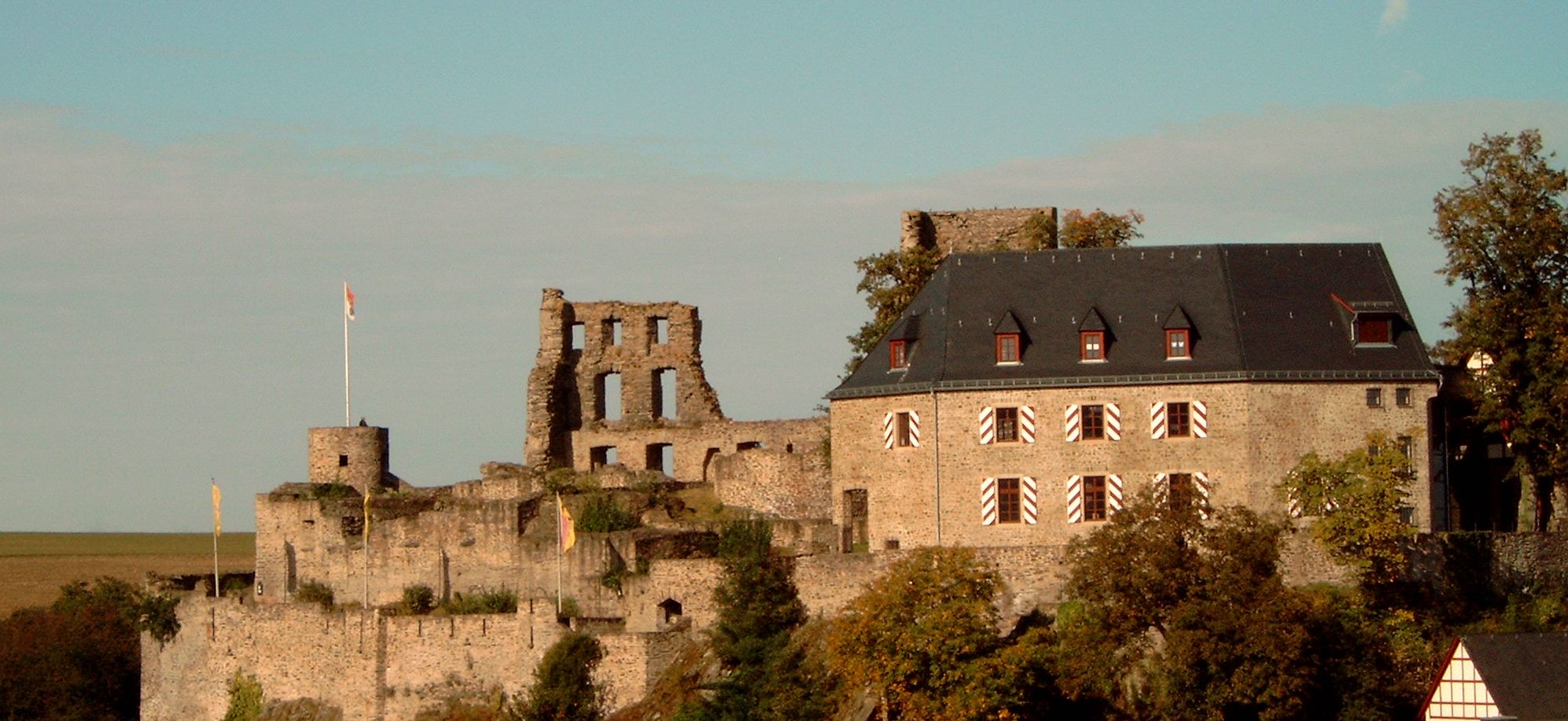
Kastellaun Castle in the county of Sponheim, residence of Edward Fortunatus

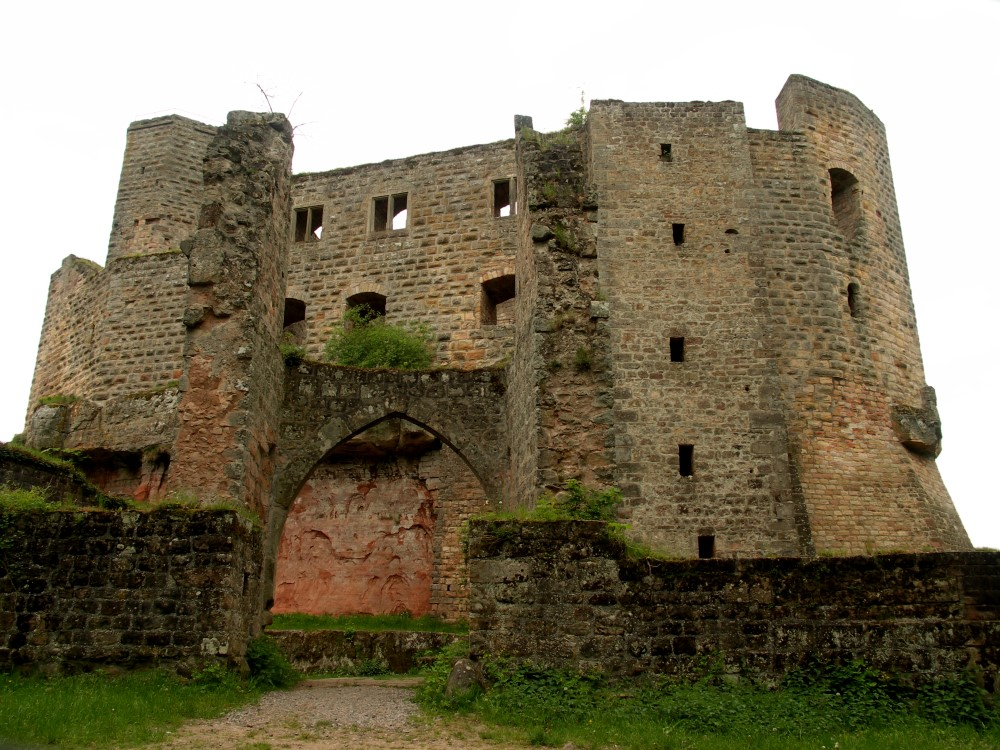
Gräfenstein Castle in Rodalben, centre of the Lordship of Gräfenstein

The Margraviate of Baden-Baden consisted of a core area on the right bank of the middle Upper Rhine, centred on the cities of Baden and Rastatt, as well as further territories in the Upper Rhine region and west of the Rhine. Some of these belonged to the Swabian imperial circle, others to the Upper Rhenish Circle.

=== Rastatt and Baden ===
The core territory extended from Ettlingen to Steinbach. It was bordered to the north by the Margraviate of Baden-Durlach, to the west by the Rhine river, to the east by the Duchy of Württemberg, and in the south by the Hanauerland. Other important neighbours were Electoral Palatinate, the Prince-Bishopric of Speyer, and the Free imperial city of Strasbourg.

The Margrave's residence and capital city was Baden until 1705 and Rastatt thereafter. The cities of Ettlingen, Kuppenheim, Steinbach, and Stollhofen served as administrative centres, through which smaller settlements and the countryside were administered. The Alsatian towns of Seltz and Beinheim on the left bank of the Rhine directly opposite Rastatt also belonged to Baden-Baden. Malsch, which was initially part of Württemberg, became part of Baden in 1603. Illingen was an exclave, belonging to Speyer, but entirely surrounded by Baden-Baden territory.

Until 1660, the theoretically independent County of Eberstein, which encompassed the middle stretch of the Murgtal and had its main city at Gernsbach, was de facto part of Baden-Baden. After the extinction of the Eberstein line in 1660, Baden-Baden split the territory with Speyer.

In 1688, the core territory was extended south to Bühl, which replaced Steinbach as the local administrative centre over the course of the 18th century. In this period, Kuppenheim was also eclipsed as an administrative centre by Rastatt.

=== Other Upper Rhenish territories ===
Until 1629, Baden-Baden shared control of Lahr-Mahlberg with Nassau-Saarbrücken. After that, they partitioned the territory, with Lahr going to Nassau-Saarbrücken, while Mahlberg, Kippenheim, and Friesenheim went to Baden-Baden. In 1693, Margrave Louis William acquired Burg Staufenberg near Durbach. After the French abandoned Kehl, Emperor Leopold I assigned it to Baden-Baden in 1698. In 1701, Baden-Baden also received the rights to the Landvogty of Offenburg.

=== County of Sponheim ===
On the Moselle and Nahe rivers and in the Hunsrück, Baden-Baden shared sovereignty over the Fore and Hinter Counties of Sponheim with the Electoral Palatinate and various collateral lines of the Palatinate. The Hinter County encompassed the modern districts of Bernkastel-Wittlich and Birkenfeld. Its administrative centres were Birkenfeld, Allenbach, Dill, Herrstein, Winterburg, Kastellaun und Trarbach. The Fore County lay in Hunsrück and on the Nahe, and extended into Rhenish Hesse. The most important cities were Kirchberg, Gemünden, Kreuznach und Sprendlingen.

=== Other territories west of the Rhine ===
The Margraves controlled Rodemachern, Useldingen and Hespringen in the modern territory of France and Luxembourg. In the Palatinate Forest, they owned the Lordship of Gräfenstein, which they had shared with the Leiningen family until 1557. After Gräfenstein Castle was destroyed in 1635, the margrave shifted the administration to Rodalben.

== History ==
The Margraviate of Baden-Baden was created in 1535, as a result of the division of the Margraviate of Baden. In the 16th century, it was heavily influenced by Bavaria. Between 1594 and 1622, the territory came under the occupation of the Margraviate of Baden-Durlach. The territory was heavily damaged by the Thirty Years' War and the Nine Years' War. The wealthy sovereigns Louis William and Sibylle maintained an expensive court culture and built many secular and religious structures in the Baroque style. After the death of Augustus George in 1771, the margraviate was inherited by Charles Frederick of Baden-Durlach.

=== Creation ===
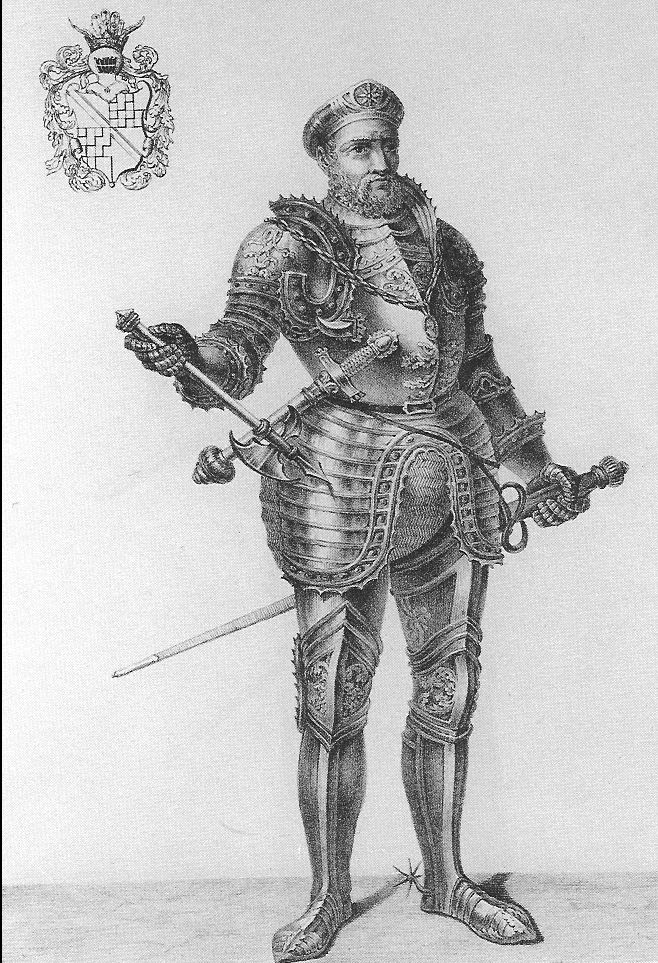
Bernhard III of Baden-Baden, regent from 1535 to 1536 and namesake of the Bernhardine line of the House of Baden

The Margraviate of Baden-Baden was created as a result of two territorial divisions of the Margraviate of Baden.

In 1503, Margrave Christopher I had reunited the Margraviate of Hachberg-Sausenberg with the main Margraviate of Baden (from which it had been separated in 1306) and ruled over a geographically scattered but politically unified territory, which included the area around his residence in the city of Baden, lordships in the southern part of the Upper Rhine region, and estates to the west of the Rhine. He intended to avoid a re-partition of the margraviate by establishing his son, Philip as sole heir. However, Philip's older brother Bernhard did not accept his father's will and was exiled to Burgundy as punishment. Philip's younger brother, Ernest also rebelled with the help of his father-in-law, Frederick I, Margrave of Brandenburg-Ansbach. Christopher finally gave in and devised a division of his territory into three parts in 1515: Bernhard received the areas west of the Rhine, Philip got the core territory around Baden, and Ernest received the estates to the south.

When Philip died in 1533, without male heirs, Bernhard and Ernest initially planned to rule the core territory together. However, they soon came into conflict and decided to divide it. Bernhard set the dividing line (which mostly followed the River Alb) and Ernest was given the choice of portions. He chose the area north of the Alb. The territories which each of the brothers had received in 1515 remained unchanged by this deal. After the new division, Bernhard thus ruled over the areas west of the Rhine and the portion of the core territory south of the Alb. Ernest moved his residence to Pforzheim and was referred to thereafter as the Margrave of Baden-Pforzheim, while Bernhard remained in Baden and was called the Margrave of Baden-Baden. The brothers carried on further negotiations about details of the division and only finalised an agreement through the mediation of Louis V of Palatine at the end of 1536. This agreement was documented by a treaty which was signed in Heidelberg.

Bernhard's heirs, who continued to rule his Margraviate of Baden-Baden until 1771, are called the "Bernhardine line" of House Baden, after him.

=== Close alliance with Bavaria ===
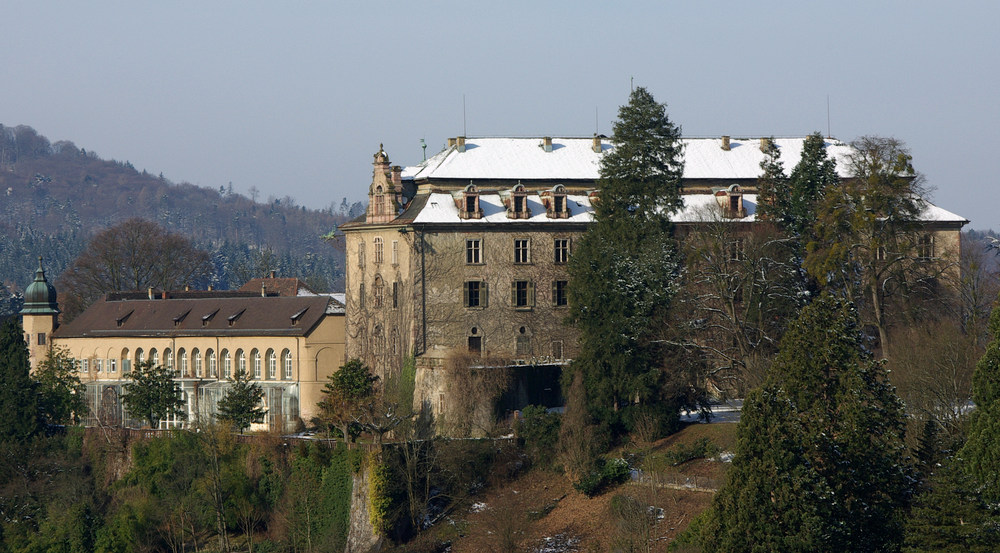
The New Castle in Baden-Baden, residence until 1705

When Bernhard died in 1536, his eldest son, Philibert was a newborn and his second son, Christopher, had not yet been born. Ernest claimed Bernhard's territories for himself and attempted to press his claim before the Reichskammergericht in Speyer, but he was opposed by Bernhard's widow Franziska of Luxemburg and Philipp's daughter, Marie Jacoba, who pushed for a regency. John II of Simmern, Wilhelm IV of Eberstein, and Duke William IV of Bavaria (Marie Jacoba's husband) were appointed as legal guardians of the young princes. Freiherr Henry of Fleckenstein was appointed as the actual regent in Baden-Baden.

Philibert grew up in Munich and assumed control of the government when he turned twenty in 1556. In 1557, he married Mechthild of Bavaria, who was four years older than him and had known him since childhood. He fought in Hungary against Suleiman the Magnificent and in France against the Huguenots. He died in 1569, during the latter campaign, when his son, Philip II was only ten years old.

Philip II's legal guardian was Duke Albert V of Bavaria. He had the young margrave educated at Ingolstadt by Jesuits in the doctrines of the Counter-Reformation and installed him as ruler of Baden-Baden in 1571, when he was twelve. Otto Henry von Schwarzenberg, the regent in Baden-Baden from 1570 was completely under Albert V's control. From 1572 to 1582, he had Philip's residence, the New Castle in Baden-Baden expanded by architect Caspar Weinhart, in the style of the Italian Renaissance.

Music played a central role at the court. It is reported that there were over two hundred musical instruments in the Neues Schloss in 1582. Philip II died suddenly in 1588 at the age of twenty-nine, leaving the margraviate large debts, but no heir.

=== Upper Baden Occupation ===
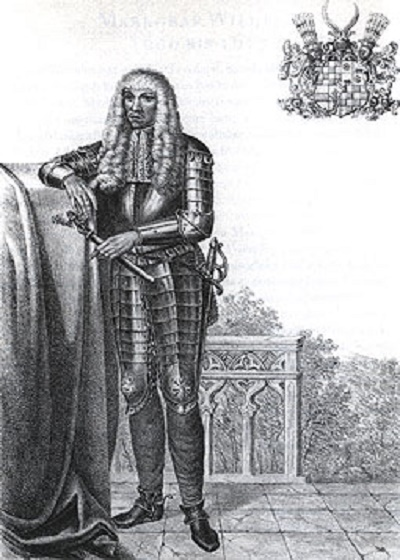
Edward Fortunatus, Margrave of Baden-Baden (1588–1594)

After Philip's death, his cousin, Edward Fortunatus became the reigning margrave. He was the grandson of Bernhard III by his son Christopher II and had grown up in London, receiving his name from Queen Elizabeth I, who was his godmother. Due to his luxurious lifestyle, the margraviate's debts grew further. Edward sought to resolve this issue by giving two Italians, Francesco Muskatelli and Paul Pestalozzi, free rein of the basement vaults of Yburg, where they were to work on alchemy and counterfeit money. When Emperor Rudolf II decided to place Baden-Baden under administration, as a result of its high debts, he installed Margrave Ernest Frederick of Baden-Durlach over the core territory of Baden-Baden in November 1594. Edward Fortunatus responded by asking the two Italians to poison Ernest Frederick. The plan failed however, and the pair were dismembered. Edward Fortunatus withdrew to his territories to the west of the Rhine, where he died in an accident in 1600. The occupation of Baden-Baden is known as the "Upper Baden Occupation".

=== Thirty Years' War ===
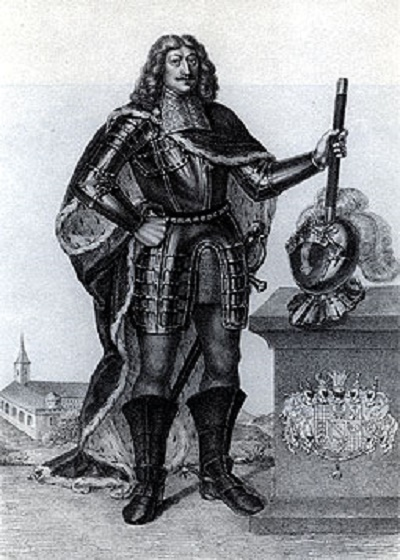
William, Margrave of Baden-Baden (1622–1677)

George Frederick, who became Margrave of Baden-Durlach after his brother's death in 1604, took both portions of Baden into the Thirty Years' War on the Protestant side. The Baden Army, which had consisted of 200 cavalry and 600 infantry in 1600, had grown to 20,000 men by 1620. When the army of Ernst von Mansfeld approached the Upper Rhine in 1622, George Frederick sought to merge the Baden Army with Mansfeld's army. However, the two commanders could not agree which of them should have supreme command, so George Frederick had to fight the forces of Tilly at the Battle of Wimpfen on his own. Both sides suffered heavy losses in the battle, which took place on 6 May 1622, but Tilly was victorious. That same summer, the victorious Catholics installed William, son of Edward Fortunatus, as Margrave of Baden-Baden, ending the Upper Baden Occupation.

In 1632, the Swedes under King Gustavus Adolphus conquered the Upper Rhine, including Baden-Baden. He returned control of Baden-Baden to Baden-Durlach in 1633. However, immediately after the Swedes and their allies (including Baden-Durlach) were defeated in the Battle of Nördlingen in 1634, William took over Baden-Baden once more, seizing a portion of Baden-Durlach's territory as well. In the following years, the city of Baden suffered from the passage of opposing armies - it was pillaged three times between 1642 and 1644. The population of the margraviate declined during the war by more than 50%. In the Peace of Westphalia, the territorial situation in Baden was restored to how it had been in 1550. However, since France had annexed much of Alsace, Baden-Baden now found itself on the western border of the Holy Roman Empire.

=== The era of the Turkish Louis ===
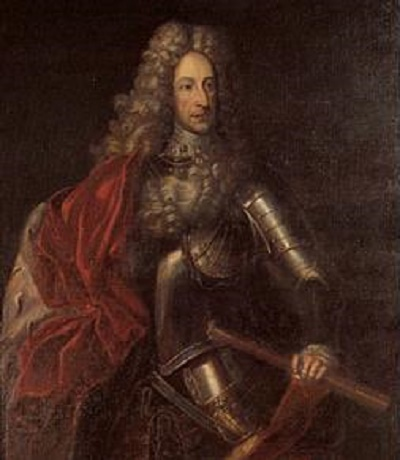
Louis William, the "Turkish Louis", Margrave of Baden-Baden (1677–1707)

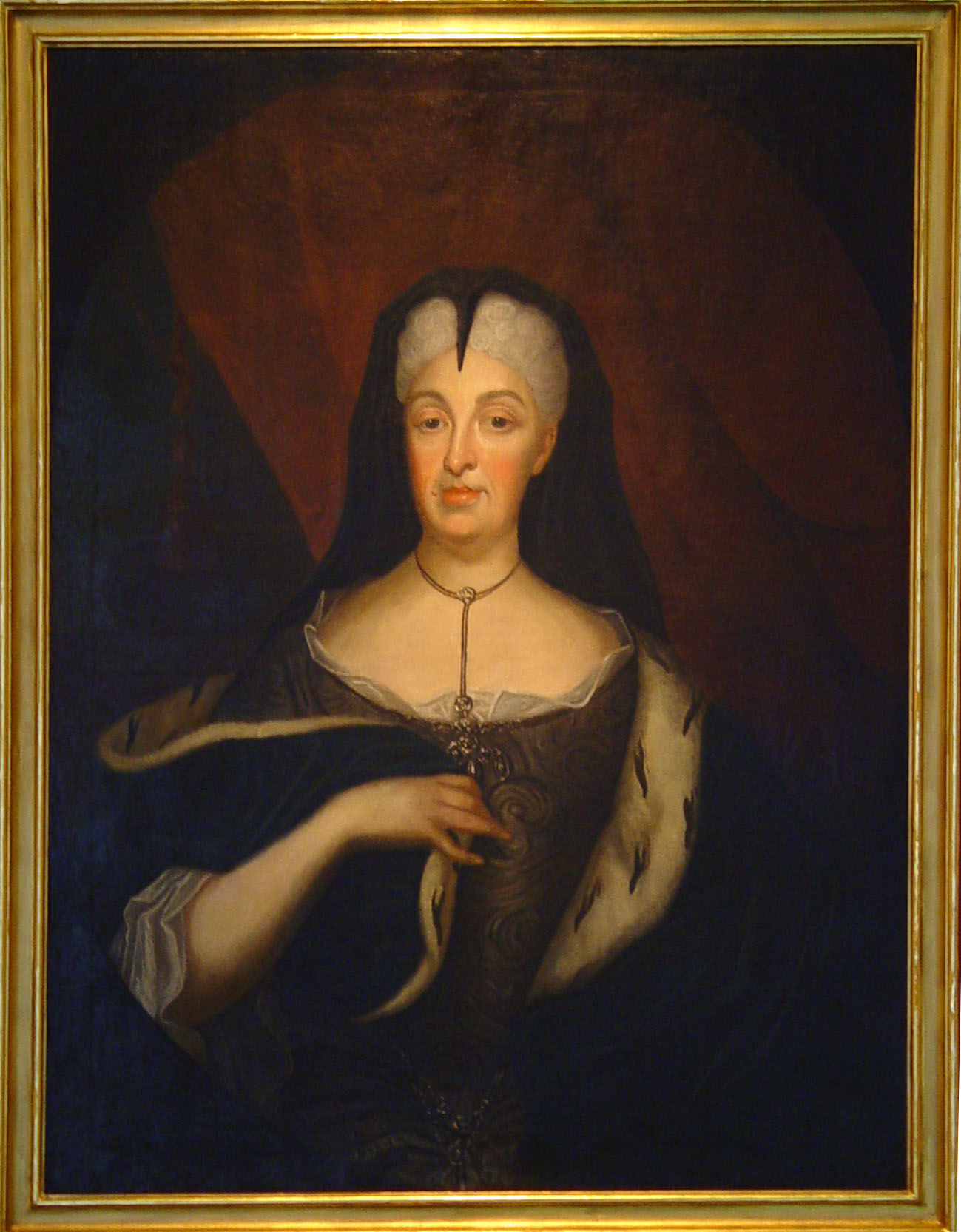
Sibylle of Saxe-Lauenburg, wife of Louis William and Regent of Baden-Baden (1707–1727)

The period after the Thirty Years' War was marked by immigration and rebuilding. William's oldest son, Ferdinand Maximilian moved to Paris, where he married and had a son, whom he named after King Louis XIV. This son, Louis William would become the most famous ruler of Baden-Baden, owing to his service as a general of the Holy Roman Empire. After a dispute with his wife, Ferdinand Maximilian returned to Baden-Baden with his son and remarried to Maria Magdalena of Oettingen-Baldern. He never assumed control of the margravate because he predeceased his father in a hunting accident in 1669. Louis William, then fourteen years old, was sent on the Grand Tour by his grandfather a year later, during which he visited Genf, Milan, Florence, Rome, Venice, and Innsbruck, among other places. After that, he returned to Baden-Baden, aged 19, and enlisted in the Imperial Army, where he swiftly rose up the ranks.

After Wiliam's death in 1677, Louis William became the Margrave, but he only rarely visited Baden-Baden on account of his military duties. He was also absent in 1688, when the French Army crossed the Rhine under General Mélac and entered the Nine Years' War. In 1689, Mélac systematically burnt all the cities and villages of Baden, except for Gernsbach. While the city of Baden burnt on 24 August 1689, Louis William was fighting against the Turks in the Balkans, where he was promoted to the position of Commander in Chief of the Imperial Army on 6 September 1689.

In order to give his successful commander the resources to rebuild his homeland, Emperor Leopold attempted to marry Louis William to Anna Maria, the oldest daughter of Julius Francis, Duke of Saxe-Lauenburg, who had died in September 1689, leaving both his daughters with a substantial inheritance. When visited her at Schloss Zákupy in Bohemia in January 1690, he instead fell in love with Anna Maria's fourteen-year-old sister Sibylle. He married her on 27 March 1690. Shortly after this, Louis William returned to war. After the Battle of Slankamen, his greatest triumph, he was promoted to the rank of Lieutenant General and entered the Order of the Golden Fleece. The Emperor then transferred him to the western front and gave command of the war with the Turks to Louis William's cousin, Prince Eugene. After the withdrawal of the French, Louis William and Sibylle returned to Baden-Baden in 1693. As a result of his battles with the Turks, he brought substantial wealth (the Karlsruhe Turkish booty) with him and the couple began to rebuild the Margraviate.

Initially, Louis William had the Neues Schloss in Baden rebuilt. However, since he did not consider this a sufficient residence for an Imperial Lieutenant General, he had a new palace in the baroque style built by Domenico Egidio Rossi in the village of Rastatt, for around twelve million guilder. When the initial construction was completed in 1705, the ruling couple and their court relocated from Baden to Rastatt, which was already developing into a city. The Schloss Rastatt was the first baroque palace in the Upper Rhine region. Subsequent baroque palaces at Karlsruhe, Bruchsal, and Mannheim was probably inspired by it. Louis William died at Rastatt in January 1707 of complications from a wound that he had sustained at the Battle of Schellenberg during the War of the Spanish Succession.

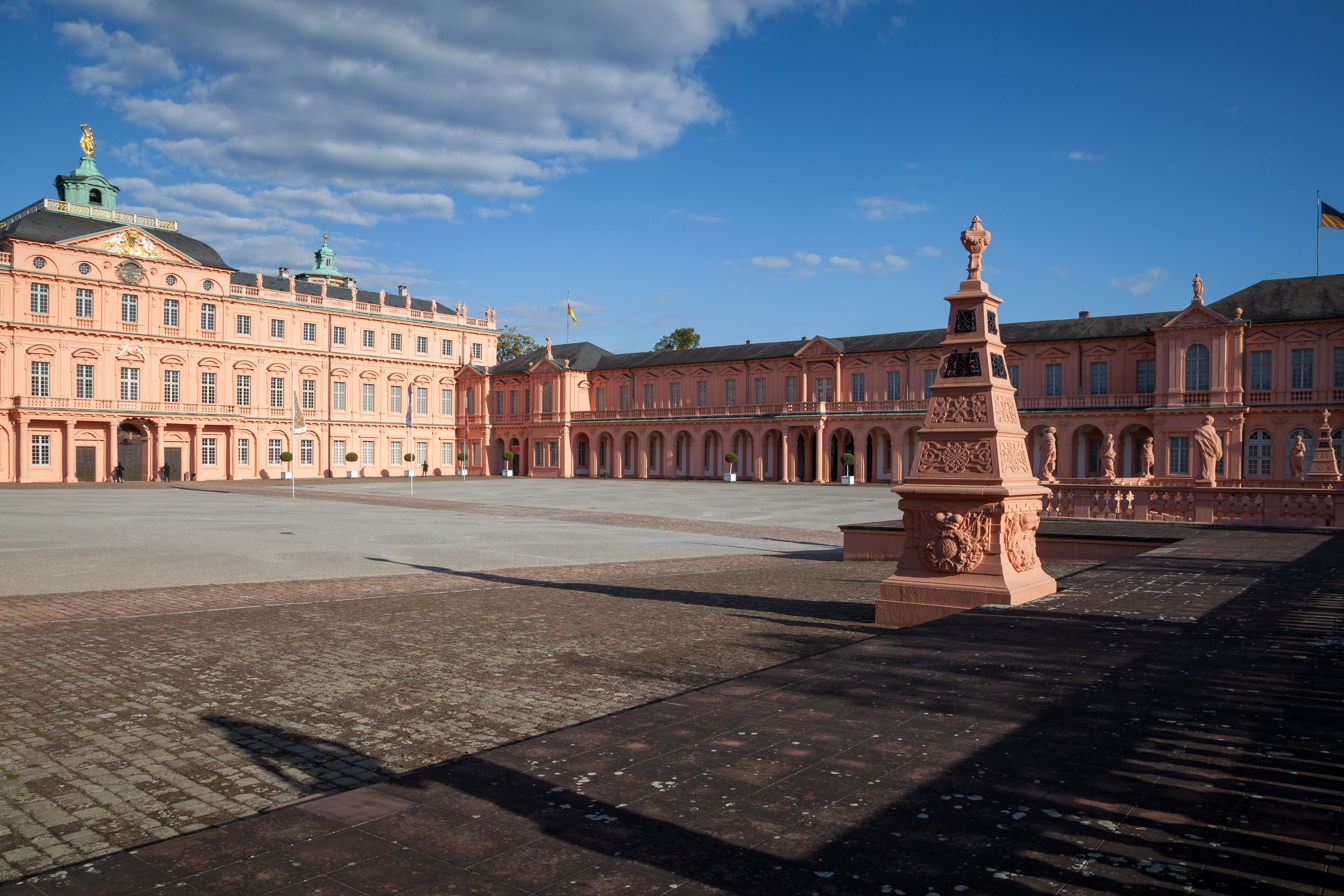
Schloss Rastatt, residence of the margraves from 1705

=== Absolutism and baroque Rastatt ===
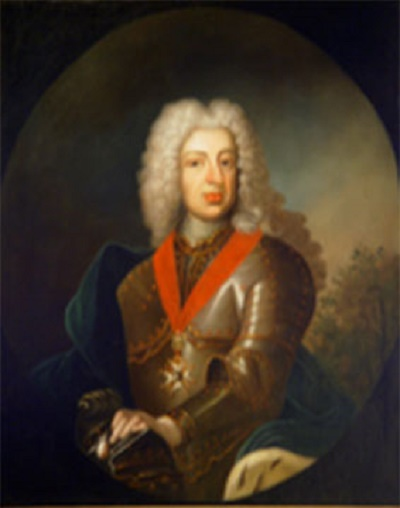
Louis George, the Jägerlouis Margrave of Baden-Baden (1727–1761)

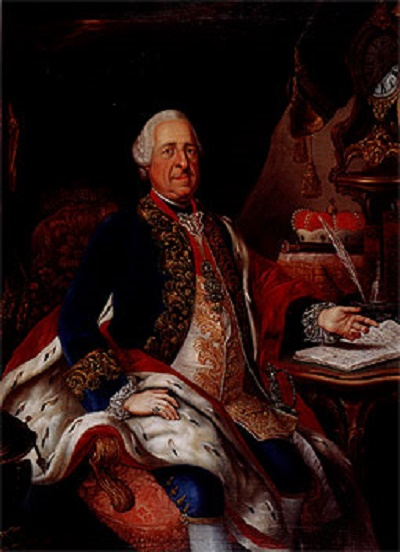
Augustus George, the last Margrave of Baden-Baden (1761–1771)

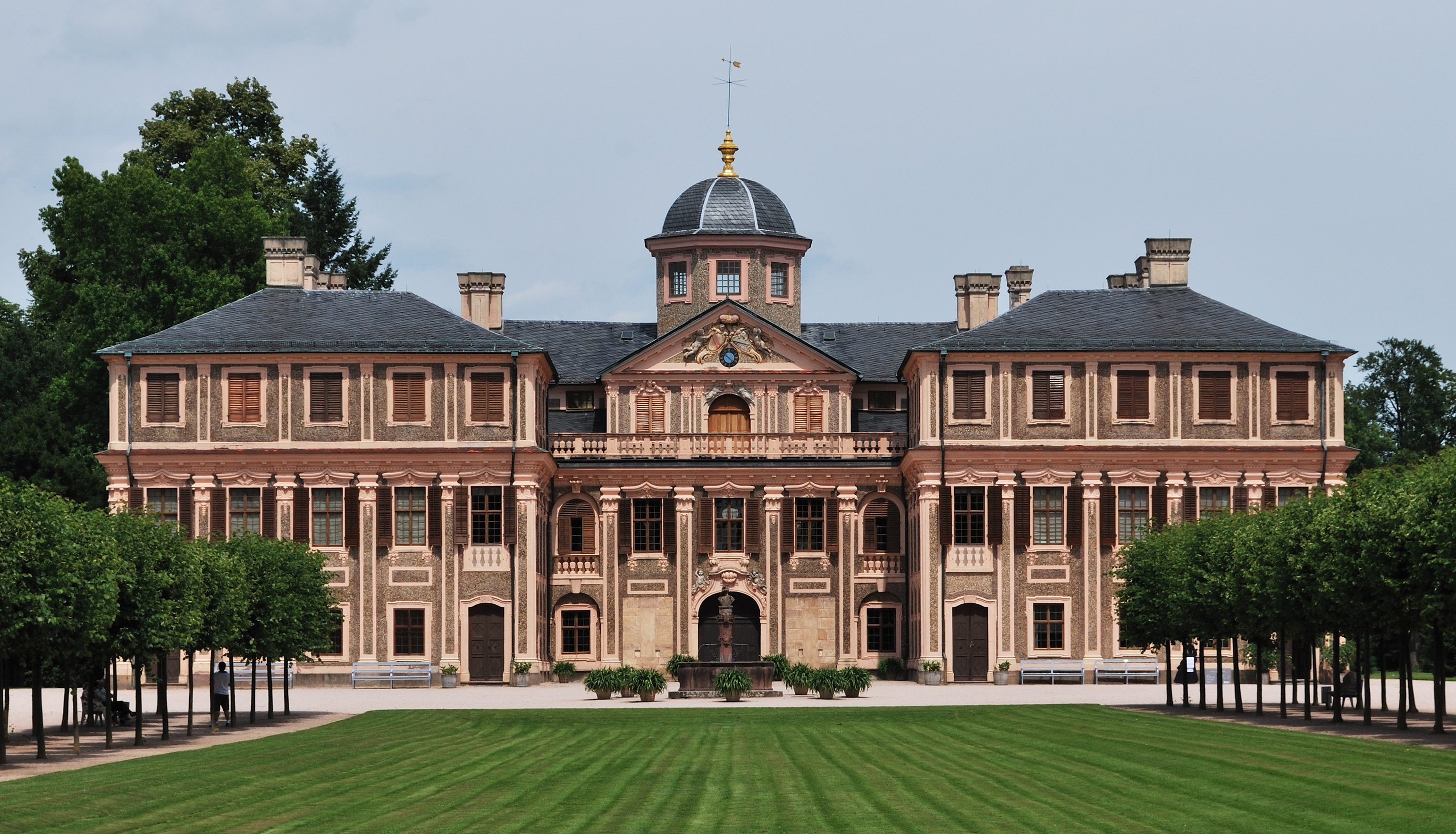
Schloss Favorite, maison de plaisance and hunting lodge of Sibylle of Saxe Lauenberg

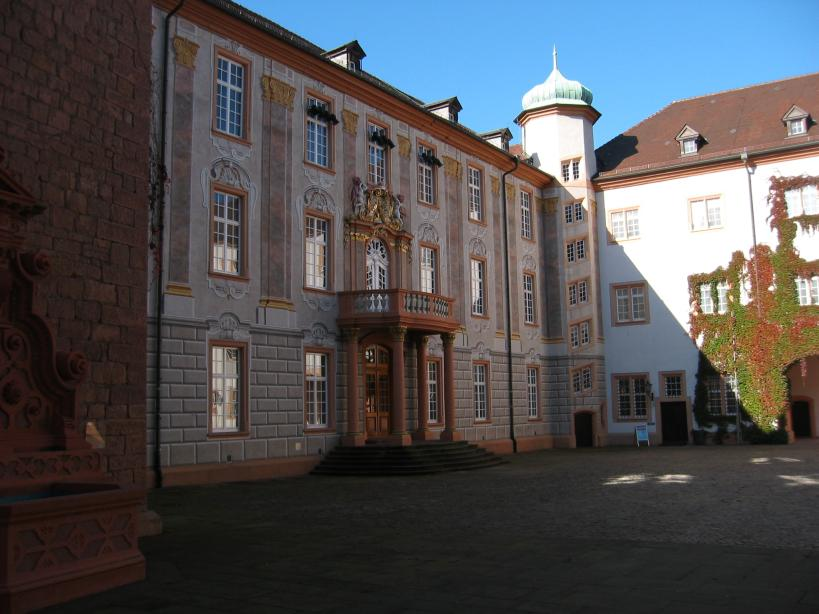
Ettlingen Palace

In his will, Louis William designated his widow, Sibylle, as the Upland Regent. In May 1707, the French occupied Rastatt and Sibylle escaped with her children to Ettlingen. Against the advice of the Emperor, who encouraged her to return to her homeland in Bohemia in 1707, Sibylle remained in Baden-Baden and assumed the regency.

In the of winter 1713–14, Prince Eugene and Marshall de Villars held the peace negotiations that brought an end to the War of the Spanish Succession at Schloss Rastatt, finally signing the Treaty of Rastatt in March 1714. This treaty was not written in Latin, as was then normal, but in French and was one of the impetuses for the development of French as Europe's diplomatic language. After the conclusion of the peace treaty, Sibylle returned to Rastatt and focussed her energies on the government, construction work and court life.

She was a strong regent and did not allow Johann Wilhelm, Elector Palatine and Duke Leopold of Lorraine, whom Louis William had named as her legal guardians in his will, to take power from her. She entrusted internal politics to Carl, Freiherr of Plittersdorf (1633-1727), who had already worked closely with Louis William, as the head of the exchequer. In external politics, she corresponded with the most important princely houses of Europe, including the Emperor, the King of France, and the Elector of the Palatinate. From 1715, Damian Hugo Philipp von Schönborn, later Prince-Bishop of Speyer, served as a personal advisor and she maintained an active correspondence with him.

Sibylle also concerned herself personally with construction. She dismissed Rossi as court architect in 1707 and replaced him with the Bohemian Johann Michael Ludwig Rohrer. Inspired by a pilgrimage to Einsiedeln Abbey, she had Einsiedeln Chapel built in Rastatt in 1715. She particularly paid attention to the planning and decoration of Schloss Favorite, which she had built near Rastatt as a summer residence. The interior decoration and valuable porcelain collection of the Margravine remain at the Schloss to this day. Rohrer's other work includes Ettlingen Palace, Hofgut Scheibenhardt, the Pagodenburg in Rastatt, and a hunting lodge at Fremersberg near Baden. The court Kapellmeister was another Bohemian, Johann Caspar Ferdinand Fischer, who had produced his first published work in 1695, during the reign of Louis William, and retained the position until his death in 1746.

In 1727, Sibylle handed power over to her 25-year-old son, Louis George. He had only learnt to talk at the age of six and remained more interested in hunting than government throughout his life. The people referred to him as the "Hunter Louis" (Jägerlouis) to distinguish him from his father, the "Turkish Louis" (Türkenlouis). During his reign, Peter Ernst Rohrer succeeded his brother as court architect in 1732. He built the Alexiusbrunnen, Rathaus, and St.-Alexander-Kirche in Rastatt. Both of Louis George's sons by his first wife died in childhood and his second wife remained childless, so he died without male heirs in 1761.

He was succeeded by his brother, Augustus George, who had initially been a priest, but received permission to leave the priesthood from Pope Clement XII in 1735 and married Marie Victoire d'Arenberg. Since the couple's children did not reach adulthood, it was clear that the Margravate of Baden-Baden would cease to exist when Augustus George died.

=== Reunification of Baden ===
From his accession, Augustus George worked to arrange an acceptable succession arrangement. Since Baden-Baden would clearly be inherited by Baden-Durlach when he died, he negotiated a treaty with Charles Frederick of Baden-Durlach, which was signed in 1765. This treaty provided for most of Baden-Baden's territory to be inherited by Baden-Durlach, except for the Bohemian possessions which had been brought into the Margravate's possession by Sibylle of Saxe-Lauenburg and would be inherited by her relatives. The Ortenau, which Louis William had received as an Imperial fief would revert to the Emperor. The treaty also stated that surviving members of the Margravial family would be financially supported and that Catholic institutions, like Lichtenthal Abbey and the Stift of Baden-Baden, would retain their possessions.

In order to protect the religious freedom of his subjects, Augustus George pursued the beatification of his medieval ancestor, Bernhard II, which he successfully achieved in 1769. Augustus George chose Bernhard as holy patron of the Margravate of Bade-Baden and had the Bernhardusbrunnen built in Rastatt in his honour. In 1770, he introduced compulsory education with a general national school ordinance.

Margrave Charles Frederick of Baden-Durlach asked Prussia, England and Denmark to act as guarantors of the succession, while Augustus George asked Pope Clement XIII; Emmerich Joseph von Breidbach zu Bürresheim, Elector of Mainz; and Maria Theresa of Austria. However, in Vienna, the Aulic Council summoned by Emperor Francis advised against confirming the treaty. After Augustus George's death on 21 October 1771, Charles Frederick entered Rastatt. He claimed his inheritance and had the civil service swear loyalty to him. However, after Charles Frederick installed two teachers in the former Jesuit college in Baden city, whose way of life did not conform to the expectations of the Baden citizens, the city submitted a complaint to the Aulic Council regarding their new lord. The dispute, in which Augustus George's widow Maria Victoria was also involved, stretched beyond the borders of Germany and was only resolved by a compromise in 1789.

== Religion ==
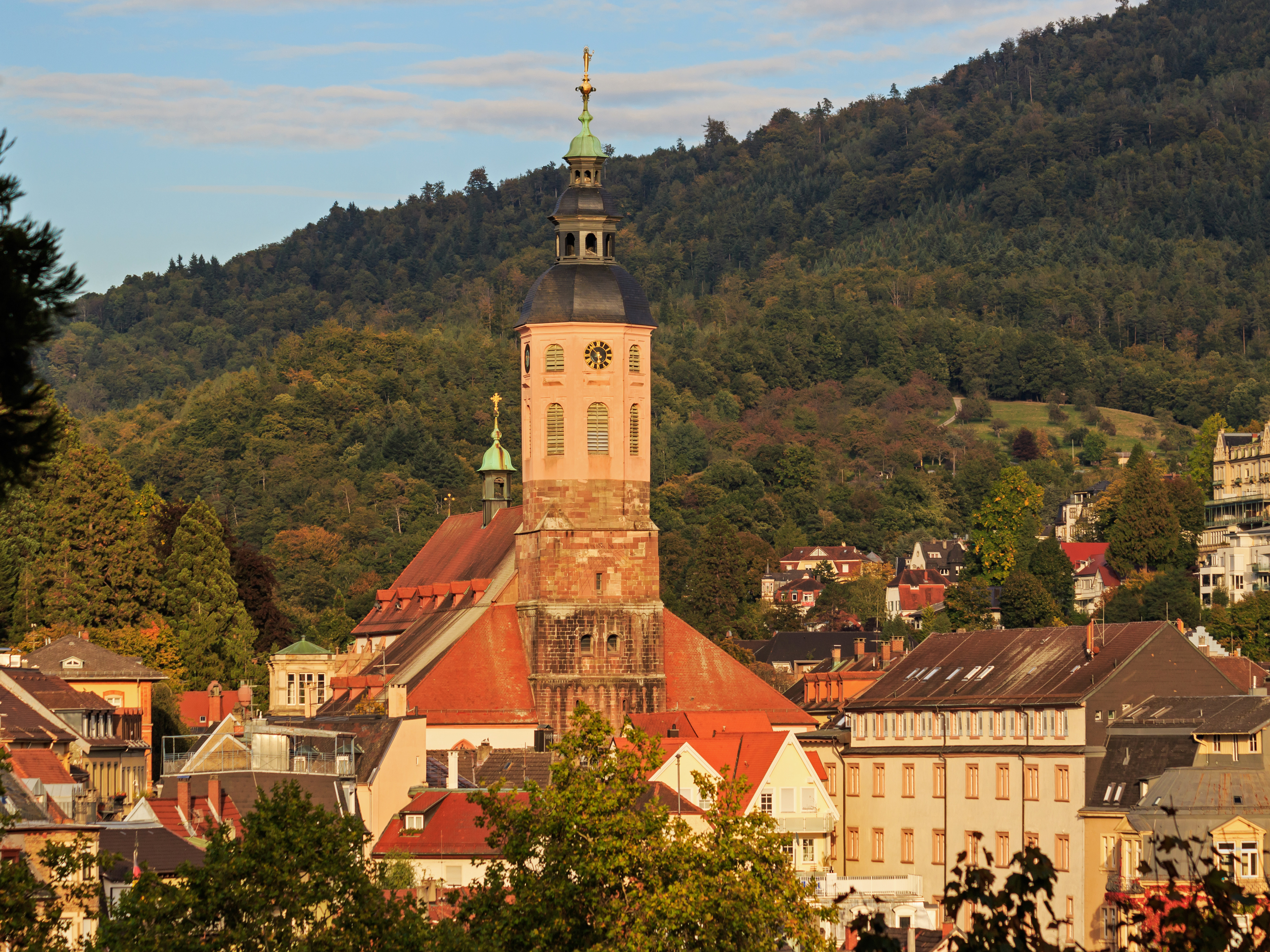
Stiftskirche in Baden-Baden, the main church of the Margraviate and mausoleum of the margraves

=== First Re-Catholicisation ===
When the Margravate was created in 1535, Protestantism had already taken root there. At the time, the reformer Matthias Erb was the court preacher at the Stiftskirche in Baden-Baden. This church was the mausoleum of the margraves and the spiritual centre of the margravate. The margraves were initially indifferent to the new development and took no direct steps regarding their subjects' religious beliefs and practices.

This changed in 1569, after the death of Philibert, when Albert V of Bavaria, who was later an important figure in the Counter-Reformation, gained influence over Baden-Baden. The Bavarian governor, Schwarzenberg, initially took harsh action against the Protestant councils and later also forced the population to hold Catholic beliefs and to attend church regularly. Those who refused were required to leave the country. Chancellor Samuel Hornmold, first appointed in 1573, was fired from his position by Schwarzenberg in 1574 and expelled from Baden-Baden, because he had not pursued the Re-Catholicisation as he had hoped.

Witch-hunts also began at the same time. The first victim was an elderly lady in 1569. Under torture she identified further women as witches, launching a series of further investigations. Between 1573 and 1577, further witch-hunts took place, in which at least twenty-five women were killed, including the wife and daughter of town clerk Rudolf Aindler. Philipp led further witch-hunts in 1580, in which 18 women were killed.

In November 1583, Baden-Baden adopted the Gregorian Calendar (the Protestant Baden-Durlach did not do so until 1701). In Autumn 1585, an unmarried townswoman, "seven bad spirits were cast out" of Anna Koch over a three-month period by Andrea Vermatt, who worked as a Cathedral preacher and exorcist in Speyer. This public demonstration of the power of the Catholic church was advertised throughout the Empire in leaflets. The Lordship of Gräfenstein was also recatholicised, while Protestantism was able to flourish in the Counties of Sponheim and Eberstein and the Lordship of Mahlberg, as a result of agreements with Protestant leaders.

=== Return to Protestantism ===
The Re-Catholicisation process ended in 1588, when Edward Fortunatus became margrave. He had no active religious policy, but allowed James III, his counterpart in Baden-Hachberg (a division of Baden-Durlach) to hold a religious debate in Baden in 1589. James chose his advisor Johann Pistorius and the Jesuit priest Theodor Busaeo to represent the Catholic side and two theologians from Tübingen, Jakob Schmidlin and Jacob Heerbrand to represent Protestantism. The Baden Debate ended in disaster. Since no agreement could be reached about the format of the debate, no discussion of the actual theological subject matter was possible. Therefore James III cancelled the debate.

At the beginning of the Upper Baden Occupation, the Margraves of Baden-Durlach had promised the Emperor that they would not change the religion of Baden-Baden and they did not interfere with religious matters initially. Despite this, a large portion of the population returned to Protestantism. From around 1610, Margrave George Frederick actively supported the Protestants in Baden-Baden. In the city of Baden, they received their own priest and were allowed to share the Stiftskirche with the Catholics. This last concession in particular led to a long-lasting conflict, in which the Margrave intervened, increasingly curtailing the rights of the Catholics. In 1613, he had the Catholics arrested after they presented a petition to him. He dismissed the highest-ranking Catholic dignitary, the Stifts-canon Eberhard Häusler, bringing Catholic opposition to a standstill.

=== Second Re-Catholicisation ===
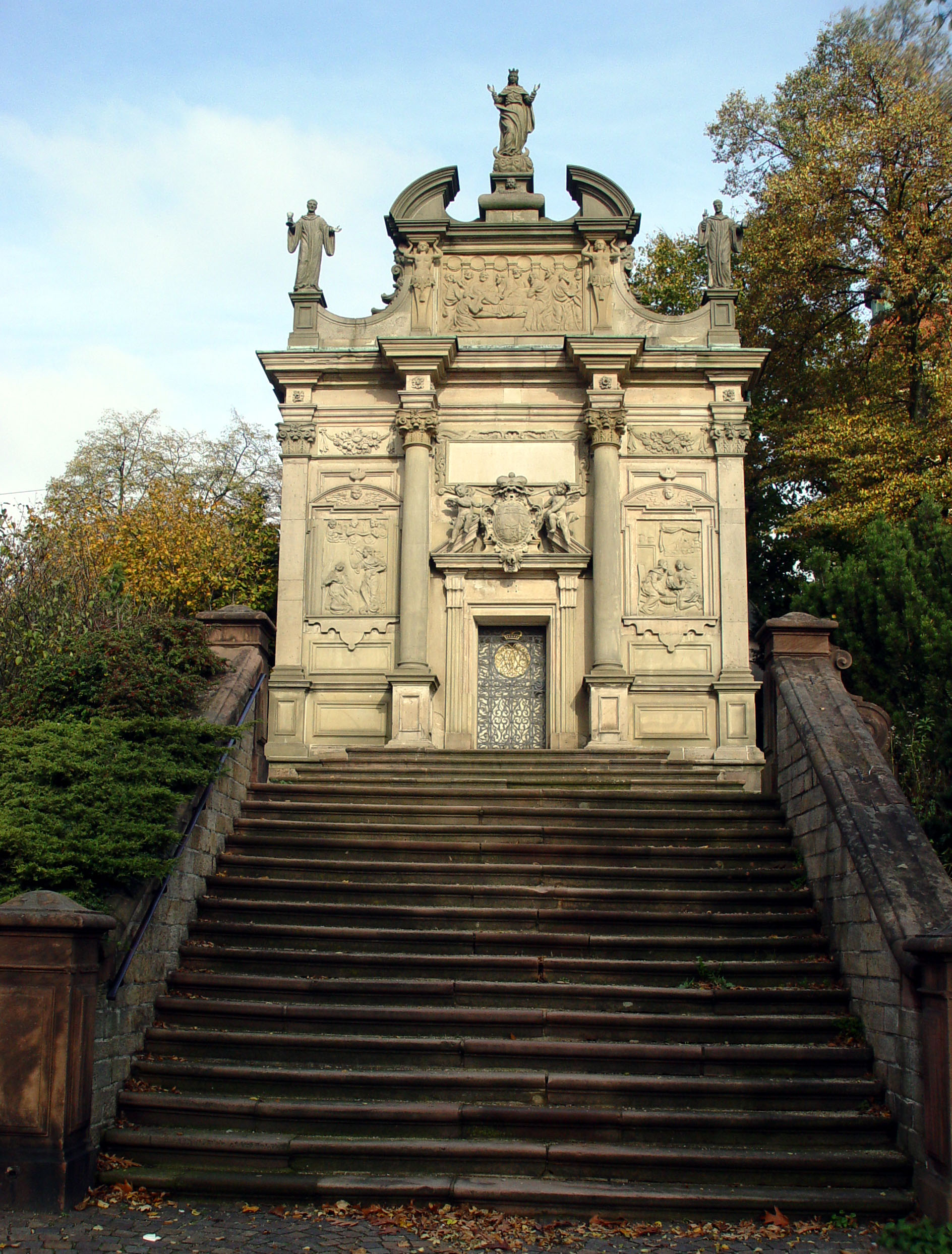
Einsideln Chapel, Rastatt

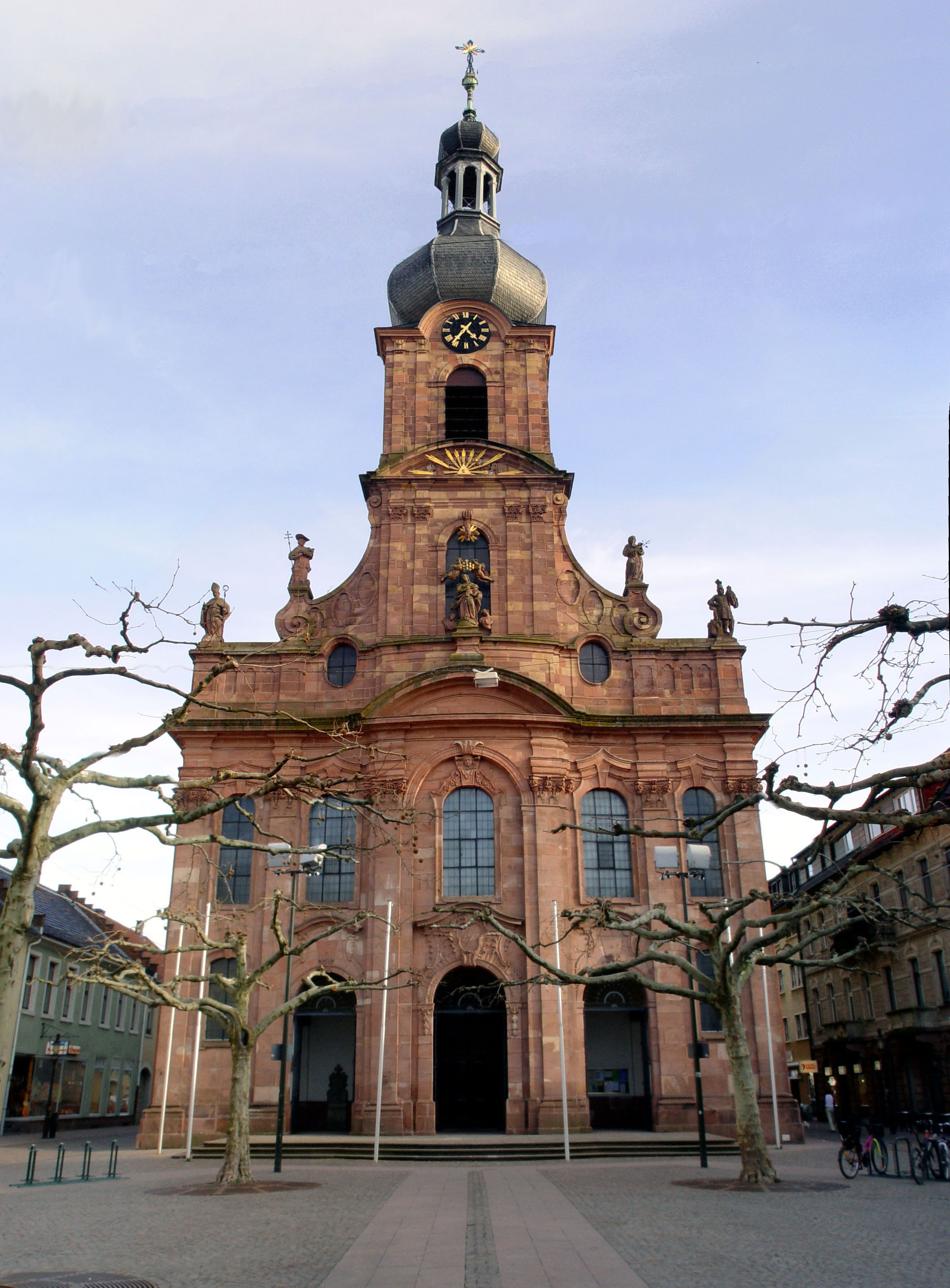
St. Alexander's, the main Catholic church of Rastatt

After William took power in 1622, Baden-Baden was re-catholicised through repressive measures with the aid of the Jesuits and Capuchins. William gave his subjects until Christmas 1624 to either convert to Catholicism or leave the Margraviate. The former mayor of Baden, Johann Häußler, initially went into exile. When he later returned to the city and begged to be allowed to stay on account of his age and previous service, he was given a heavy fine and again presented with the choice of converting or leaving. A townswoman, Anna Weinhag, who had written to William begging that she not be required to convert, was charged with witchcraft and was tortured for several days in December 1627. Since she had not confessed under torture, she was allowed to go, on condition that she paid the costs of the investigation, remained inside her house, and did not talk about details of the torture. In total, Margrave William indicted 244 people in the Margraviate for witchcraft between 1626 and 1631, of whom more than three quarters were women. 231 were convicted and executed. In the 1630s, the Counter-Reformation was institutionally grounded in Baden-Baden through the establishment of Capuchin monasteries and Jesuit colleges.

=== Baroque piety ===
Sibylle von Saxe-Lauenberg had been educated in her youth by Piarists and became a remarkably religious woman. After the death of her husband, Louis William, her religiosity became increasingly fanatical under the influence of the Jesuit priest Joseph Mayer. In 1717, Mayer organised a penetential procession, in which participants wore crowns of thorns and whipped themselves. The influence of Damian Hugo Philipp von Schönborn later encouraged her piety in more worldly directions. She undertook a total of eight pilgrimages to Einsiedeln Abbey. Her young son Louis George, who had previously seemed to be mute, began to speak on one of these journeys, which she considered to be a miracle. Her piety also manifested in her building programme. She stated her wish to make the interior of the palace chapel at Schloss Rastatt "especially beautiful." She also had the Einsiedeln Chapel built for herself in Rastatt and a hermitage in the gardens of Schloss Favorite, where she went frequently to pray and confess.

The piety of the regent also affected the Margraviate. The clergy expanded their considerable influence in the court at Rastatt during her regency and this continued in the reign of her son Louis George. Characteristic of the period, is the construction of the Alexius fountain in 1739, which was meant to protect the citizens of Rastatt from earthquakes. This protective function was publicly considered more important than the function as part of the supply of drinking water, which was only added in 1770. The efforts to beatify Bernhard II, which met with success in 1769, are also typical. While he was particularly honoured by the Margravial family, he was also considered a patron of the Margraviate as a whole after his beatification.

The pilgrimages to Bickesheim and Moosbronn also played an important role. The church at Bickesheim received a new interior during the baroque period. The church at Bietigheim, on the way from Rastatt to Bickesheim, was also renovated, in 1748. In Moosbronn, a new church was built in 1749 to replace the wooden chapel built in 1683. Shortly after this, the church at Michelbach, on the route of the pilgrimage from Rastatt, was also renovated.

=== Judaism ===
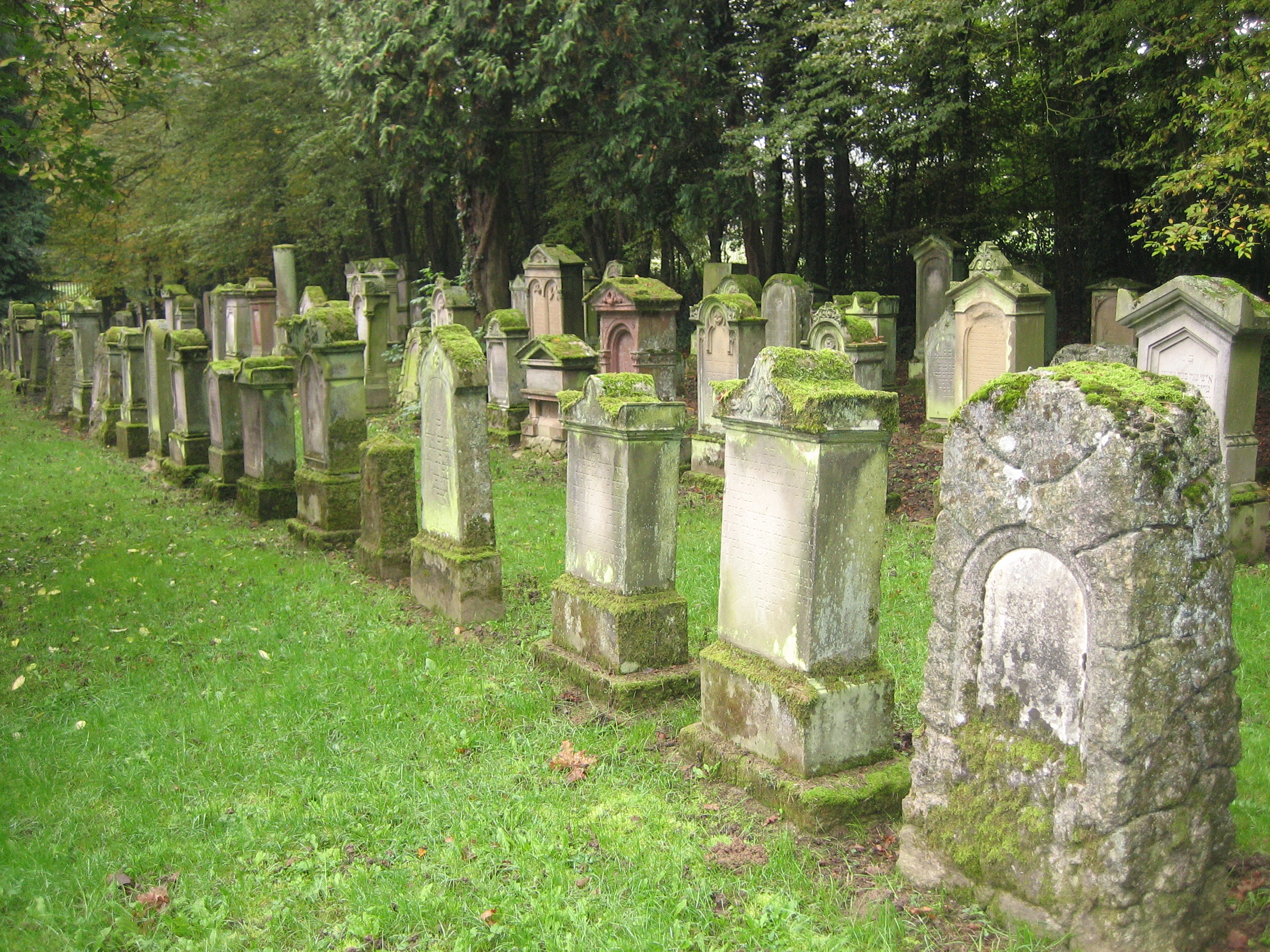
Jewish Cemetery, Kuppenheim

Numerous Jews lived in the Margraviate from the 1580s at the latest. Most of them worked as merchants or moneylenders. The Margraves of Baden possessed the Judenregal - the right to exact special protection taxes from resident Jews - from 1382. In the Margraviate of Baden-Baden, Jews could only get temporary residence permits (Schutzbriefe), which were certified by individual protection letters issued in the name of the specific Jew. The Jewish ordinance issued by Sibylle von Saxe-Lauenburg in 1714 specified that the residence permits lasted only three years and that resident Jews had to pay an annual tax of 700 guilders.

In 1579, Philip II established bureaux de change in Baden and Ettlingen and entrusted these to Jews. In Bühl, there were eleven Jews (a total of ninety people) in 1698. By 1721, that had increased to seventeen families and from 1723 at the latest, the Jewish community had a prayer hall in a private house. In Kuppenheim, there was a Jewish cemetery from at least 1694, which provided a burial place not just to the Jews of the core region of Baden-Baden, but also to Jews in the part of the Hanauerland right of the Rhine. The size of the burial fee paid to the landowners depended on the gender of the deceased and whether the Jew had lived within the Margraviate or not. For local, male Jews in 1765, the charge was four and a half guilder.

== Economy and society ==
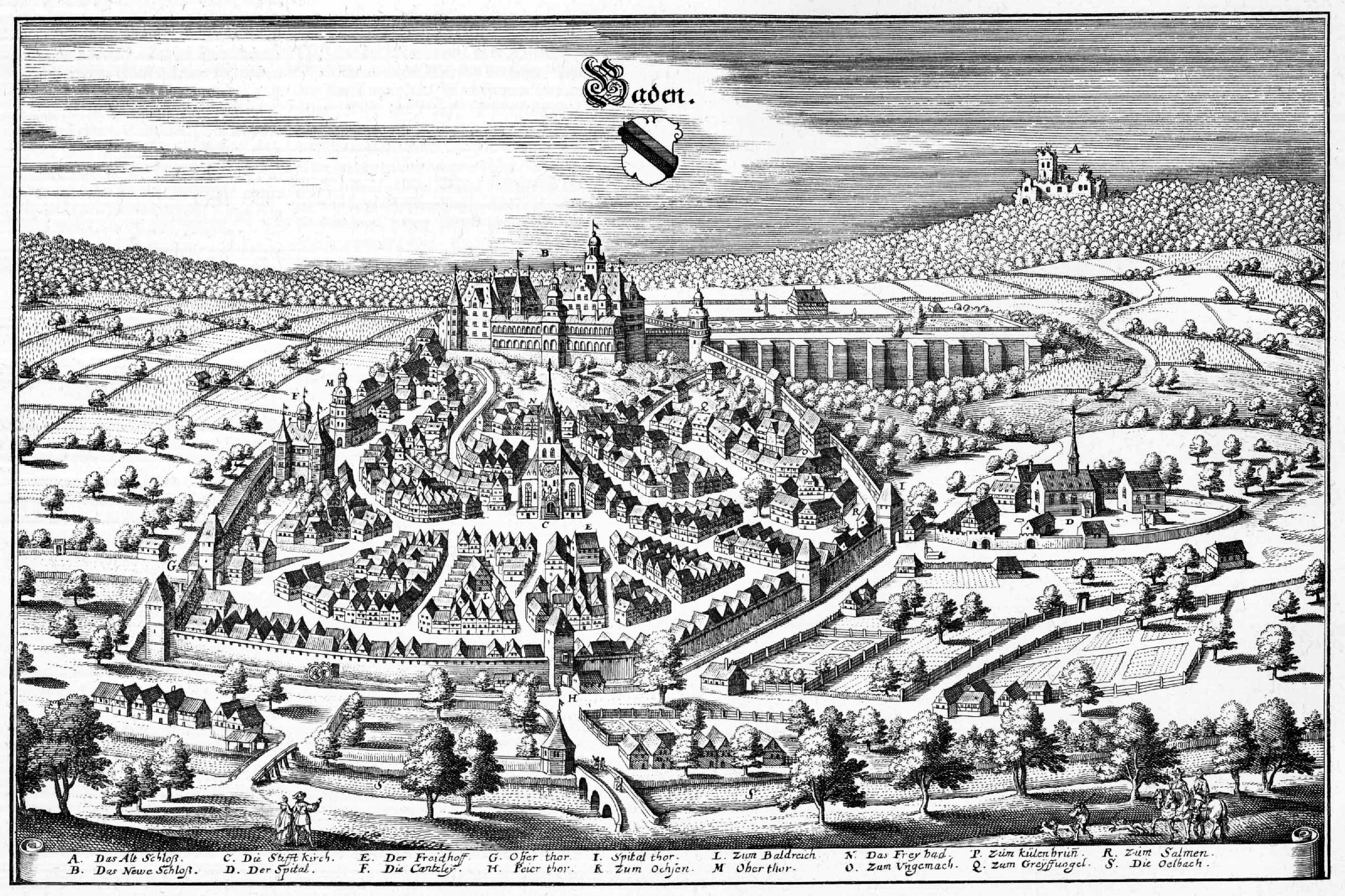
The city of Baden in the mid-17th century (from Matthäus Merian, Topographia Germaniae

=== Social structure ===
In the Margraviate of Baden-Baden, there were no large urban centres. Cities like Kuppenheim and Stollhofen were market towns and differed minimally from the surrounding regions in social structure. The capital city, Baden, was a very manageable size. The lower nobility played only a minor role, since the lordship of individual locations was often held by the Margrave directly. The region suffered significant depopulation in the 17th century, as a result of the Thirty Years' War and Nine Years' War. This was followed by a period of immigration in the 18th century after Margrave Louis William invited Bohemian farmers to settle in the Upper Rhine in 1697. However, the distinction between classes remained fairly weak - aside from the ruling family.

The social distance between members of the margravial family and their subjects was particularly dramatic in the 18th century. As an Imperial general, Louis William received a large income and his wife Sibylle von Saxe-Lauenburg brought a substantial fortune into the marriage. They had claims on more than two million guilder from the Emperor. In 1721, Sibylle personally travelled to Vienna to press her claims to financial support with Emperor Charles VI. She came to an understanding with him and received 750,000 guilder. In the 18th century, the Margravial court mainly used her extensive wealth for court functions, like the erection of government buildings and churches. This created work and led to the creation of a new town at Rastatt. Sustained investment in infrastructure did not occur; Louis William's interest in developing the economy in a mercantilist direction was not continued by his wife and sons. The Court Treasurer Dürrfeld wrote in 1765 that there were open latrines in Baden city and "no princely guest could step foot outside without being surrounded and accosted by a gang of beggars or followed by them on his journey."

=== Economy ===
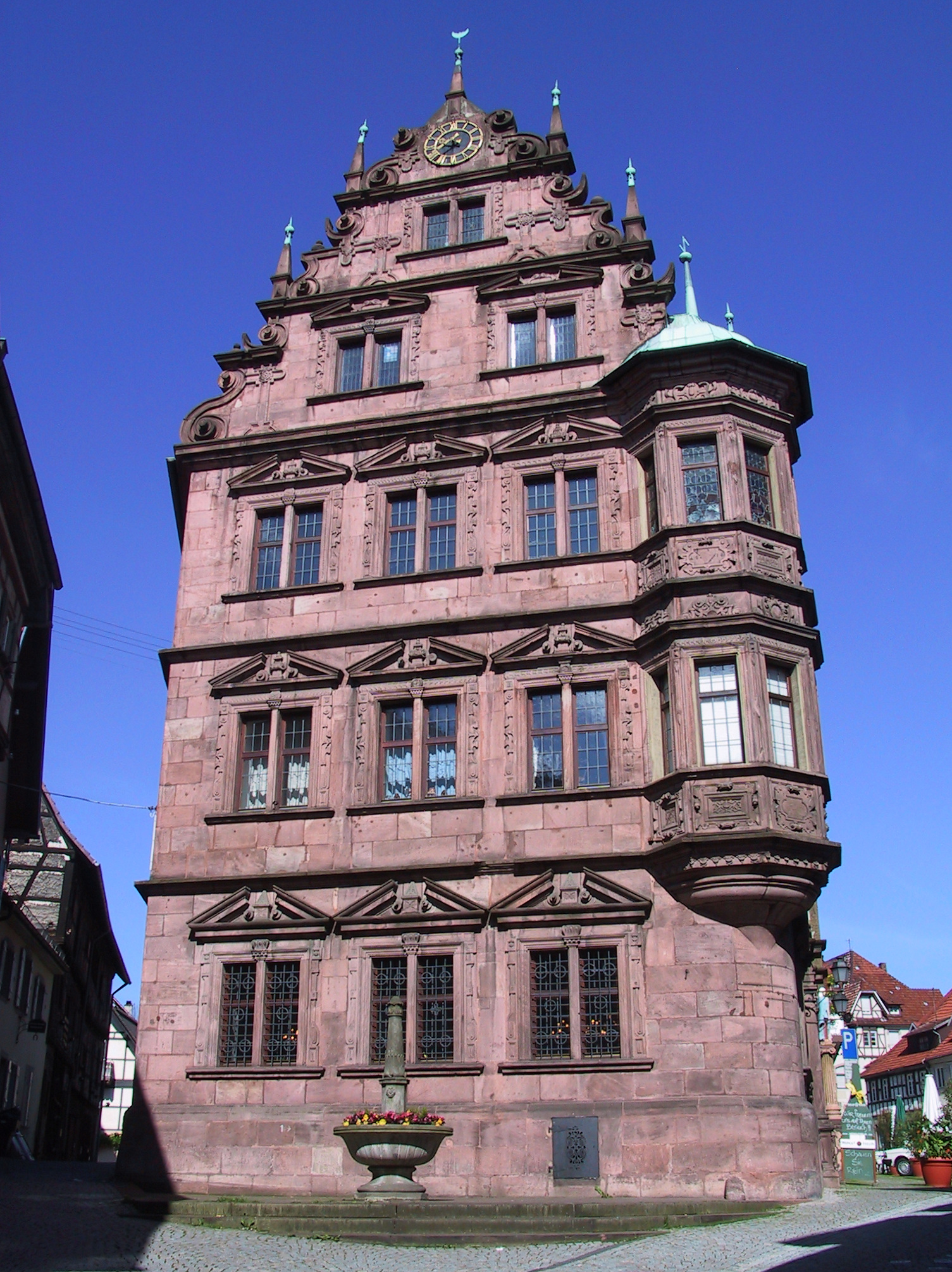
Old Rathaus, Gernsbach, built as a residence for Johann Jakob Kast

The population made their living primarily from agriculture. The main crops were rye, oats, spelt, and barley, then peas, lentils, beans, and fruit, and finally flax for linen. In the 18th century, potatoes, alfalfa, clover, squash, and tobacco were added as well. Wineries were established in the foothills of the Black Forest, in the Murg river valley and along its tributaries. People also kept horses, cattle, pigs, goats, and sheep, which usually graved in silvopasture. By the Rhine, people also made their livings from fishing, smuggling, and the manufacture of wooden shoes from poplar, willow, and alder wood.

The most important group of artisans were the rope-makers and weavers of cloth and wool, whose products were sold throughout the wider region. Other products were produced only for local populations. Weavers, millers, smiths, builders, carpenters, and shoe-makers were found throughout the whole Margraviate. Extensive commercial regulations, intended to prevent social inequality from getting larger, controlled many details. Until the Upper Baden Occupation, guilds were banned.

In the Murg valley, timber and timber rafting played an important economic role. Jakob Kast, a merchant and Murgschiffer from Hörden, who had become rich from a state monopoly could afford to lend George Frederick 27,000 guilder to finance his military expansion programme in 1611. On his death in 1615, Kast left an estate worth around 480,000 guilder, consisting mainly of investments in various farms, cities, monasteries, and private individuals. One piece of evidence of the family's prosperity that is still visible today is the Old Rathaus in Gernsbach, which Kast's son Johann Jakob Kast had built in 1618 in the mannerist style.

In the city of Baden, the government was an important employer. The bathing resorts, "Zum Salmen," "Baldreit," and "Hirsch" (which still exists today), had around fifty rooms in total and over a hundred bathing rooms at the beginning of the 17th century.

The most important income source for the Margraves was taxation of their subjects' economic activity. They also received income from tolls and mining. The margraves were also enriched by a station at Hügelsheim for exacting the Rheinzoll, which was operated jointly by Söllingen and Hügelsheim. The margraves held the Geleitrecht for the section of the road from Basel to Frankfurt which ran through the Margraviate and profited from this as well. Mining was carried out in the Murg Valley and in the Lordship of Rodemachern. There were mercantilist initiatives under Margrave Louis William, who established a hammermill in Gaggenau in 1681 and a glassworks at Mittelberg in Moosbronn in 1697.

=== Coinage and minting ===
From 1362 at the latest, the Margraves of Baden possessed the right to mint coinage. Mints were established in Pforzheim and Baden. After the division of the Margraviate in 1535, Ernst and Bernhard agreed that henceforth Baden-Durlach and Baden-Baden would mint coinage independently of one another. In the recess issued at Speyer in 1570, it was stated that each Imperial Circle could have a maximum of four mints. This meant that Baden-Durlach and Baden-Baden could no longer maintain separate mints. They later agreed to exercise the minting right alternately for a few years each.

In the 1580s, Margrave Philip II had coinage minted. Because it was underweight, he faced criticism from the Swabian Circle. He was not fazed by this, however, and his successor, Edward Fortunatus also had coinage minted at the same low weight. In 1595, Ernest Frederick of Baden-Durlach accused him of producing counterfeit coinage, after expelling him from the Margraviate at the start of the Upper Baden Occupation, and shifted Baden's mint to Durlach.

In Baden-Baden, coinage was minted again in the 1620s and 1630s by Margrave William, until the mint was destroyed towards the end of the Thirty Years' War. The small amount of coinage minted under Louis William and Sibylle von Saxe-Lauenberg was produced at a foreign mint. Efforts by Louis George to revive coin production in Baden-Baden were unsuccessful.

The Reichsmünzordnung (Imperial Minting Ordinance) of 1559, which regulated the exchange rate of the guilder, the batzen, and the kreutzer, only came into effect in Baden-Baden in the 17th century. Previously, a gold guilder had been worth 168 Baden silver pennies.

=== Weights and measures ===
There was no attempt to unify the various systems of measurement used in Baden-Baden. For historic reasons there were various regional systems in use. For example, Bühl, which historically had belonged to the territory of Ortenau, had different measurements from those used in Rastatt and Baden, which had been part of Ufgau in the High Middle Ages. Even units with the same names differed from one another, since they were based on the measures in use in their respective provincial centres.

The shoe served as the unit of length. One shoe measured:

- 30.37 cm in Baden-Baden;
- 30.466 cm in Gernsbach;
- 27.628 cm in Bühl.

The morgen was the unit of area. One morgen measured:

- 0.3801 hectares in Baden-Baden and Gernsbach,
- 0.3170 ha in Rastatt,
- 0.3126 ha in Bühl.

The size of vineyards was measured in steckhaufen, with twelve steckhaufen equalling a morgen.

There were various units of volume. The viertal and sester were used in Ortenau, while the malter was used in Ufgau. One malter measured:

- 129.6 Litres in Baden-Baden,
- 130.616 L in Gernsbach,
- 165.3 L in Kuppenheim,
- 145.381 L in Rastatt.

Wine was measured with fuders. One fuder measured:

- 1172.966 L in Bühl,
- 1109.952 L in Baden-Baden and Rastatt,
- 1130.4 L in Kuppenheim,
- 1143.696 L in Gernsbach.

The fuder was divided as follows:

- in Bühl: 24 Ohm, 96 Viertel, 576 Maß and 2304 Schoppen,
- in Baden-Baden and Rastatt: 24 Ohm, 96 Viertel, 384 Maß and 1536 Schoppen,
- in Kuppenheim: 10 Ohm, 120 Viertel, 480 Maß and 1920 Schoppen.

The zentner was the unit of weight. It was divided into 104 pounds, 416 vierlings, and 3328 lots. One Zentner measured:

- 48.553 kg in Bühl
- 48.586 kg in Baden
- 48.648 kg in Rastatt
- 48.823 kg in Gernsbach.

== See also ==
- Baden
- List of rulers of Baden

== Bibliography ==
- Kurt Andermann, in: Der Landkreis Rastatt, Band 1. Stuttgart 2002, ISBN 3-7995-1364-7.
- Armin Kohnle: Kleine Geschichte der Markgrafschaft Baden. Verlag G. Braun, Karlsruhe 2007, ISBN 978-3-7650-8346-4.
- Dagmar Kicherer: Kleine Geschichte der Stadt Baden-Baden. Verlag G. Braun, Karlsruhe 2008, ISBN 978-3-7650-8376-1.
- Staatsanzeiger-Verlag (Hrsg.): Sibylla Augusta. Ein barockes Schicksal, Stuttgart 2008, ISBN 978-3-929981-73-5.
- Gerhard Friedrich Linder: Die jüdische Gemeinde in Kuppenheim. Verlag Regionalkultur, Ubstadt-Weiher 1999, ISBN 3-89735-110-2.
- Landesarchivdirektion Baden-Württemberg (Hrsg.): Der Landkreis Rastatt (Band 1). Jan Thorbecke Verlag, Stuttgart 2002, ISBN 3-7995-1364-7.
- Friedrich Wielandt: Badische Münz- und Geldgeschichte. Verlag G. Braun, Karlsruhe 1979, ISBN 3-7650-9014-X.
