= Moncalieri Town Hall =

Town hall in Moncalieri, Italy

- Palazzo Comunale di Moncalieri
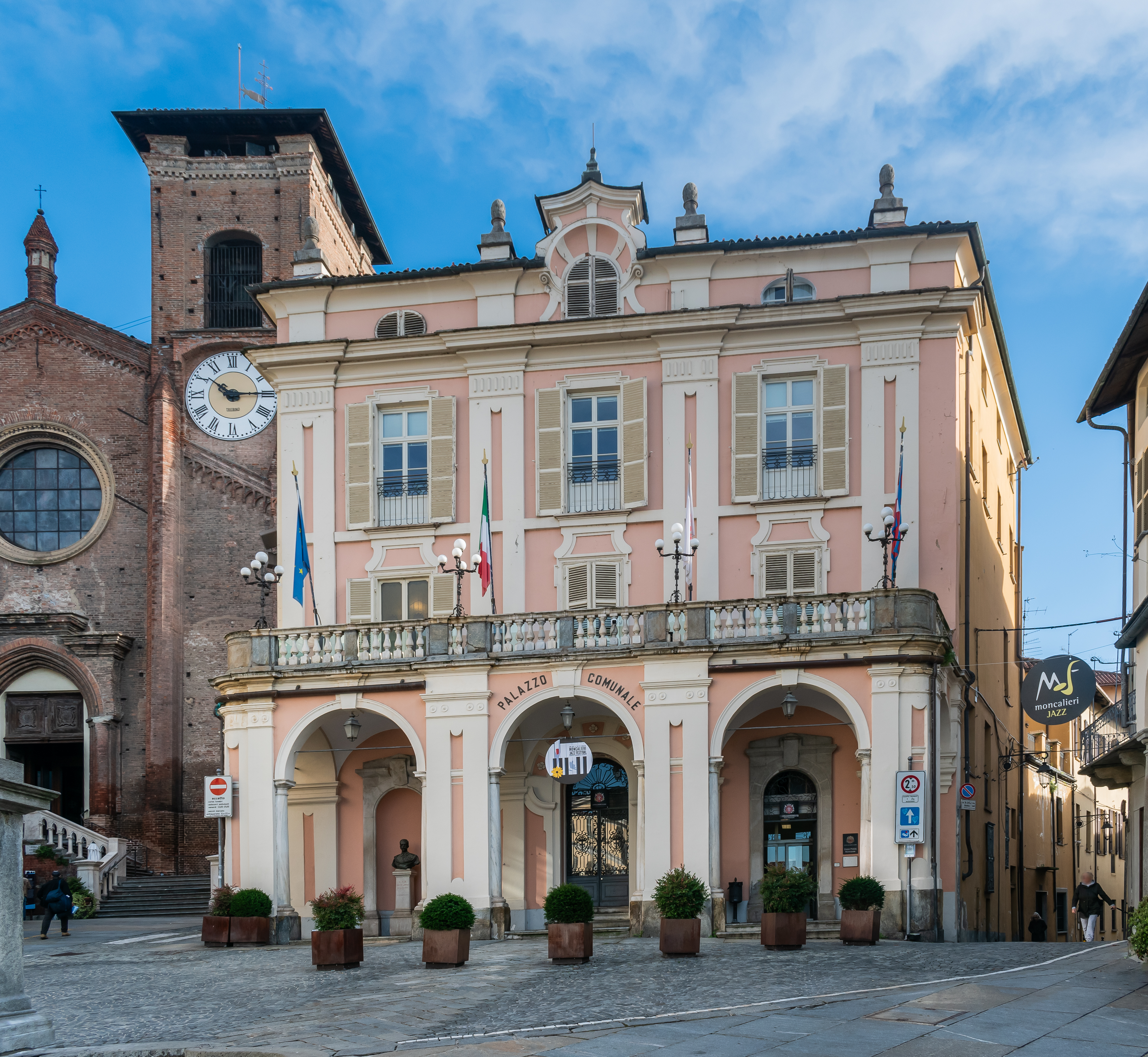
- Moncalieri Town Hall in 2023
- Click on the map for a fullscreen view

General information
- Location: Moncalieri, Italy
- Coordinates: 45°00′03.74″N 7°41′07.3″E

Moncalieri Town Hall (Italian: Palazzo Comunale di Moncalieri) is a historic town hall located in Moncalieri in Piedmont, Italy.

== History ==
The building was fully refurbished in 1778 according to a design by architect Pietro Mosso d'Andorno. Although his plans also included a grand staircase, this was not constructed until 1888, by the architect Enrico Mottura, who also carried out work on the façade.

== Description ==
The building is located in Piazza Vittorio Emanuele II, in the centre of Moncalieri, next to the Collegiate Church of Santa Maria della Scala. The façade is characterised by a large portico with three arches, separated by paired lesenes and topped by a terrace. The two upper floors feature large windows decorated with mouldings and are flanked by paired pilasters which, on the top floor, merge to form a single pier connected to the projecting cornice. The roofline is enlivened by a central dormer window, flanked by four decorative pinnacles. The main entrance, which leads to the grand staircase, is located at the centre of the portico.
