= Bernhard II of Baden-Baden =

Bernard II, Margrave of Baden
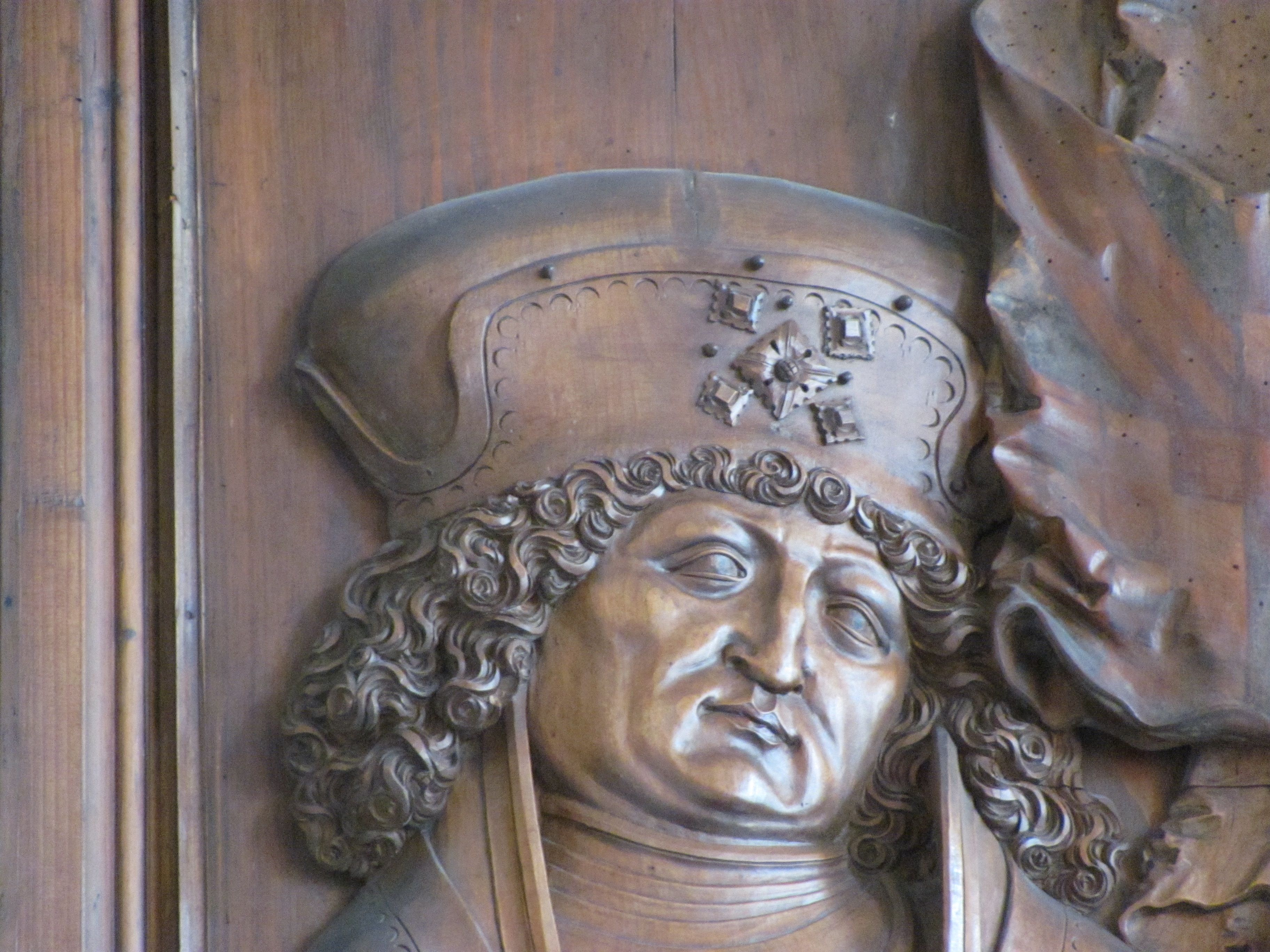
- Bernard II of Baden, depicted on the altar of the church in Babenhausen
- Born: 1428 or 1429; Hohenbaden Castle, Baden-Baden
- Died: 15 July 1458 (aged 29 or 30); Moncalieri, near Turin
- Buried: St. Mary's Church in Moncalieri
- Noble family: House of Zähringen
- Father: Jacob, Margrave of Baden-Baden
- Mother: Catherine of Lorraine

Bernhard II of Baden (1428 or 1429 at Hohenbaden Castle in Baden-Baden – 15 July 1458 in Moncalieri, Turin), was the second son of Margrave Jacob of Baden and his wife, Catherine of Lorraine. He was born in the late 1420s at Hohenbaden Castle in Baden-Baden. His exact birth date is unknown. He was beatified by the Catholic Church in 1769.

== Life ==
Bernard II of Baden grew up in a deeply religious family. His father, for example, founded Fremersberg Abbey and expanded the Collegiate Church in Baden-Baden.

Bernard II received a careful education, which would prepare him for his later role as a sovereign. The intent was that he would be Margrave of Pforzheim, Eberstein, Besigheim and several districts in the northern part of the Margraviate.

Bernard II was related to the Habsburg dynasty via his older brother Karl I, who had married Catherine of Austria, a sister of Emperor Frederick III. This relationship should give Bernard access to the imperial court. But first, he assisted his uncle René of Anjou in an armed conflict in northern Italy. According to contemporary sources, he fought bravely. After his father's death in 1453, he returned to Baden, where he agreed with his brother to give up his claim to part of the margraviate. Instead, he became Frederick III's personal envoy, despite his young age.

Bernard II saw a number of disgraceful situations and tried to alleviate hardship and poverty wherever he could. He spent most of his income assisting the poor and those in need. Even during his lifetime he impressed his contemporaries with his unusual piety.

Under pressure, after the fall of Constantinople to the Turks in 1453, the imperial Habsburg family began preparing a crusade against the expanding Ottoman Empire. Bernard II was sent to the European princely houses to promote this project. He died of the plague during one of these visits, on 15 July 1458 in Moncalieri in northern Italy. Bernardo, as they call him, is revered to this day by many people in this region.

Blessed Bernhard II of Baden
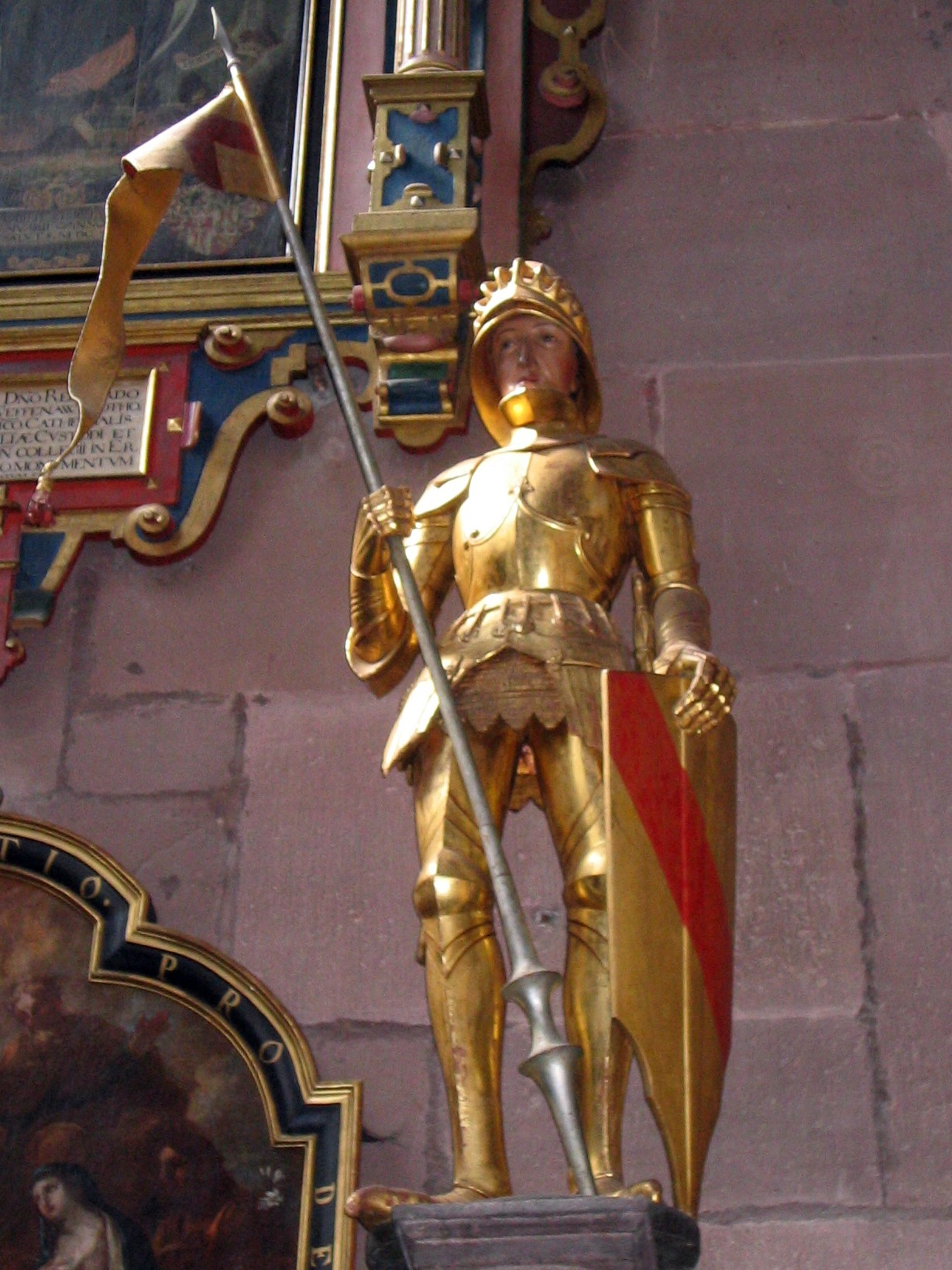
- Fountain sculpture in Freiburg Cathedral in honor of his patronage of the Archdiocese of Freiburg

Layman, Margrave of Baden-Baden
- Born: 1428 or 1429; Hohenbaden Castle, Baden-Baden
- Died: 15 July 1458 (aged 29 or 30); Moncalieri, near Turin
- Honored in: Catholic Church
- Beatified: 16 September 1769, Rome by Pope Clement XIV
- Major shrine: St. Mary's Church in Moncalieri
- Feast: 15 July
- Attributes: Armor, Shield, Flag
- Patronage: Archdiocese of Freiburg

== Aftermath ==
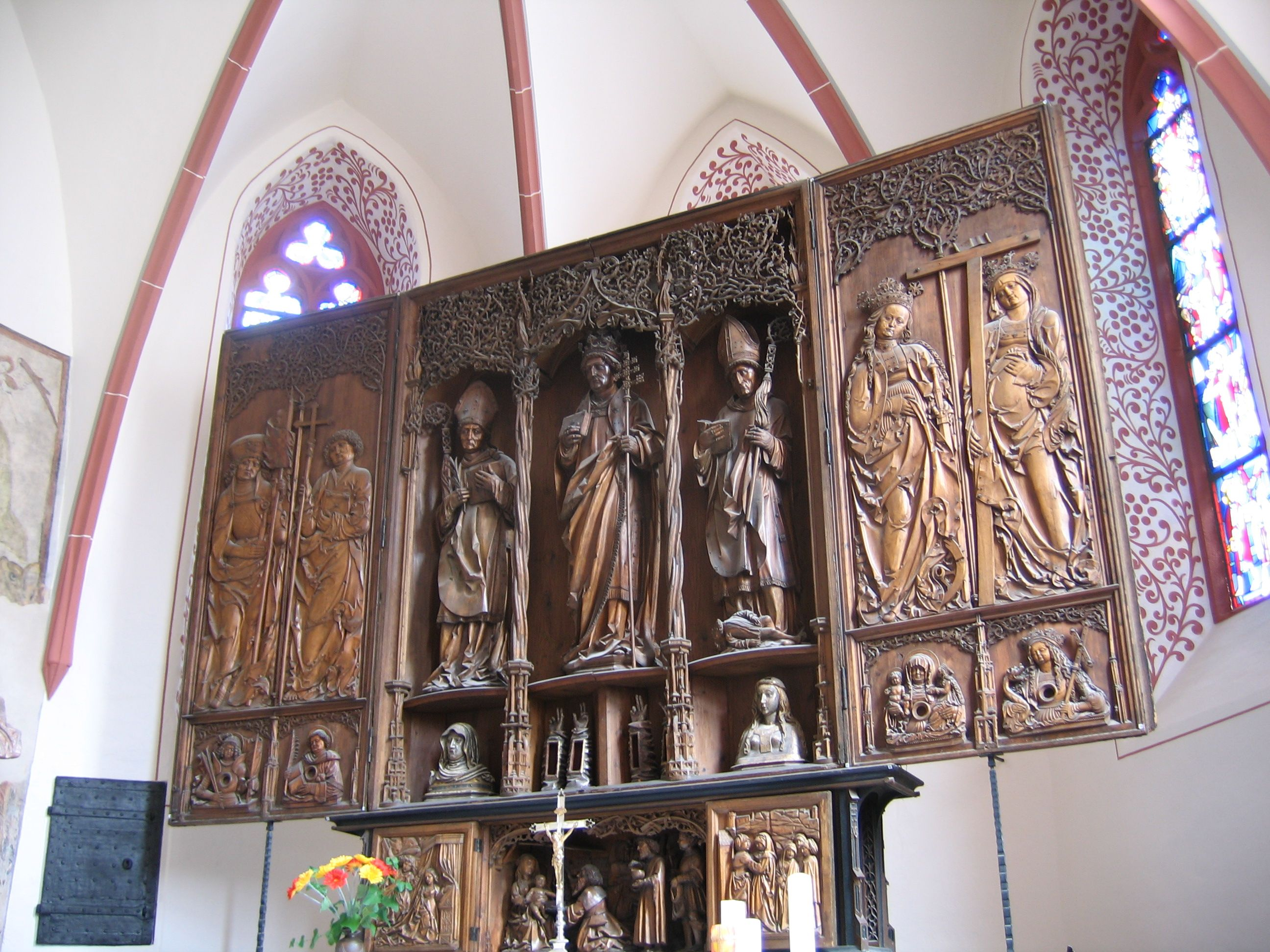
High altar in the church in Babenhausen, donated by Sibylle of Baden. Bernhard II of Baden is on the left wing on the inside

His grave in the St. Mary's Church in Moncalieri quickly became the destination of pilgrimages by devout Christians. Allegedly, many miraculous healings occurred at his grave. He was beatified in 1769. On the occasion of Bernard's beatification, Margrave August Georg Simpert constructed the Bernhardus fountain in Rastatt. Allegedly, having Bernhard canonized was considered too expensive.

After his beatification, the Catholic Margraviate of Baden-Baden chose him as its patron saint and celebrated this event on 24 July 1770; the Archdiocese of Freiburg still reveres him today as its patron. At least one miracle is said to have taken place in Freiburg. His feast day is 15 July.

His great-niece, Sibylle of Baden, who was married to Count Philipp III of Hanau-Lichtenberg, founded a high altar in the St. Nicholas church in Babenhausen on which Bernhard is shown on its left wing on the inside.

=== Beatification ===
His canonization is still being pursued. On 16 May 2011, Archbishop Robert Zollitsch of Freiburg published a public appeal in the official journal of his archdiocese. Public discussion started on 17 June 2011. On 8 November 2017 Pope Francis authorized the Congregation for the Causes of Saints to issue a decree recognising Bernhard's heroic virtue.

== Bibliography ==
- Christine Schmitt: Der selige Bernhard von Baden in Text und Kontext 1858–1958. Hagiographie als engagierte Geschichtsdeutung = Schriften zur südwestdeutschen Landeskunde, issue 46, DRW-Verlag, Leinfelden-Echterdingen, 2002, ISBN 3-7995-5246-4
- Friedrich von Weech (1875). "Bernhard II. (Markgraf von Baden)" . Allgemeine Deutsche Biographie (in German). Vol. 2. Leipzig: Duncker & Humblot. p. 416.
- H. Dietrich Siebert (1955). "Bernhard II.". Neue Deutsche Biographie (in German). Vol. 2. Berlin: Duncker & Humblot. pp. 109–109.

Bernhard II of Baden-Baden House of Zähringen Born: 1428 or 1429 Died: 15 July 1458
Preceded by Jacob	Margrave of Baden-Baden; 1453–1458; With: Karl I	Succeeded by Karl I
