= Cornelia von Loga =

German politician (born 1979)

Member of the Landtag of Baden-Württemberg
- Incumbent
- Assumed office 1 December 2023
- Preceded by: Tobias Wald
- Constituency: Baden-Baden

Personal details
- Born: 8 April 1979 (age 47)
- Party: Christian Democratic Union

Cornelia von Loga (born 8 April 1979) is a German politician serving as a member of the Landtag of Baden-Württemberg since 2023. She has served as state secretary for the interior, digitalisation and European affairs since 2026.
