= Moncalieri =

Moncalieri Moncalé (Piedmontese)
- Comune
- Città di Moncalieri
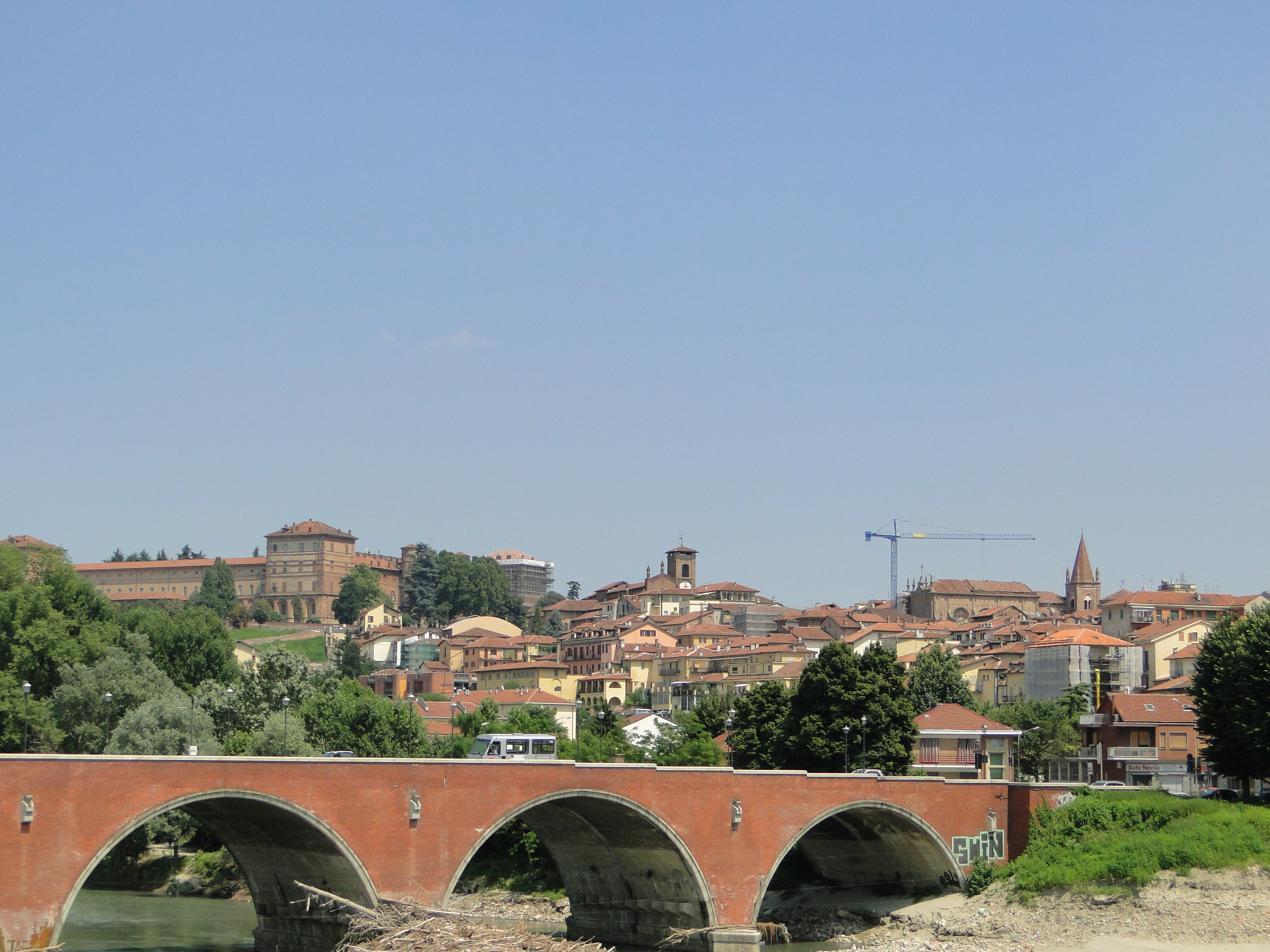
- View of Moncalieri

- Flag Coat of arms

- Location of Moncalieri in Italy Moncalieri (Piedmont)
- Coordinates: 45°0′N 07°41′E
- Country: Italy
- Region: Piedmont
- Metropolitan city: Turin (TO)
- Frazioni: Bauducchi, Barauda, Boccia d'Oro, Borgata Palera, Borgata Santa Maria, Borgo Aje, Borgo Mercato, Borgo Navile, Borgo San Pietro, Borgo Vittoria, La Gorra, La Rotta, Moriondo, Revigliasco, Rossi, San Bartolomeo, Sanda-Vadò, Tagliaferro, Testona, Tetti Piatti, Tetti Rolle, Tetti Sapini, Zona Carpice, Zona Nasi

Government
  - Mayor: Paolo Montagna (PD)

Area
  - Total: 47.53 km^{2} (18.35 sq mi)
- Elevation: 260 m (850 ft)

Population (2026)
  - Total: 55,442
  - Density: 1,166/km^{2} (3,021/sq mi)
- Demonym: Moncalierese(i)
- Time zone: UTC+1 (CET)
  - Summer (DST): UTC+2 (CEST)
- Postal code: 10024
- Dialing code: 011
- Patron saint: Beato Bernardo
- Saint day: July 15
- Website: Official website

Moncalieri (Italian: [moŋkaˈljɛːri]; Piedmontese: Moncalé [mʊŋkaˈle]) is a comune (municipality) about 8 kilometres (5 mi) directly south of the center of Turin (to whose Metropolitan City it belongs), in the region of Piedmont in northern Italy. With a population of 55,442, it is the most populous suburb of Turin.

It is notable for its castle, built in the 12th century and enlarged in the 15th century, which later became the favorite residence of King Victor Emmanuel II of Italy and of his daughter Princess Maria Clotilde of Savoy. It is part of the World Heritage Site Residences of the Royal House of Savoy.

== History ==
Moncalieri was founded in 1228 by some inhabitants of Testona (now a frazione of the comune of Moncalieri) as a refuge from the assaults from Chieri. The easy access to the Po River and the bridge (a Templar possession for a long time) that it commanded granted a certain flourishing to the city, which became a free comune and housed a number of monastic institutions.

In the 17th century it was acquired by the House of Savoy, whose members often lived in their castle here during the summer. During the unification of Italy it was the site of the famous Proclamation of Moncalieri. Having maintained its tradition as a summer resort, today Moncalieri is also home to many high technology companies.

== Demographics ==
As of 2026, the population is 55,442, of which 48.7% are male, and 51.3% are female. Minors make up 14.3% of the population, and seniors make up 27%.

Historical population

Year	Pop.	±%
1861	10,680	—
1871	10,926	+2.3%
1881	11,983	+9.7%
1901	12,267	+2.4%
1911	13,535	+10.3%
1921	15,566	+15.0%
1931	21,018	+35.0%
1936	21,181	+0.8%

Year	Pop.	±%
1951	26,039	+22.9%
1961	34,857	+33.9%
1971	56,115	+61.0%
1981	64,035	+14.1%
1991	59,700	−6.8%
2001	53,350	−10.6%
2011	55,875	+4.7%
2021	56,193	+0.6%

Source: ISTAT

=== Immigration ===
As of 2025, of the known countries of birth of 54,837 residents, the most numerous are: Italy (48,934 – 89.2%), Romania (2,171 – 4%), Morocco (560 – 1%), Albania (498 – 0.9%).

== Main sights ==
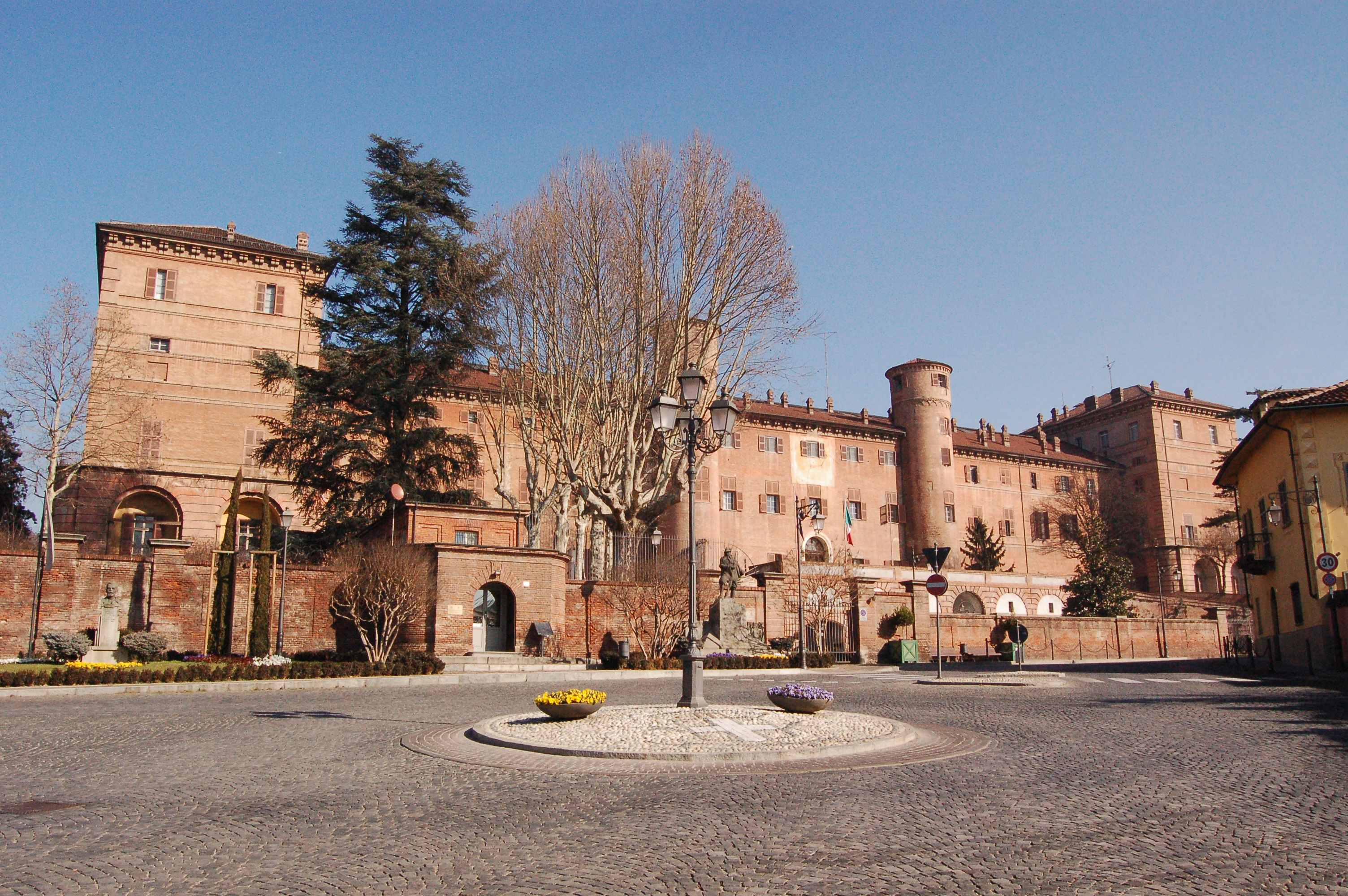
Moncalieri castle.

The castle is one of the Savoy Residences listed as a World Heritage Site. It hosts since 1919 a prestigious carabinieri school.

Close to the castle, the descending square of Piazza Vittorio Emanuele II was in the past the major centre for the Moncalieri activities. Its cobbled pavement was built back in 1825, and a sculpture-fountain of Neptune (Il Saturnio) can be found in the top part of it. For aesthetic as well as practical reasons, the Neptune fountain was several times moved back and forth. A small passage connects this square to the prestigious Real Collegio Carlo Alberto, school aimed for aristocratic descendants. Nowadays, the Collegio Carlo Alberto is managed by a joint initiative of the Compagnia di San Paolo and the University of Turin; their mission is to foster research and teaching in law, economics, finance and political science.

The Gothic church of Santa Maria della Scala houses the remains of the local patron. Other churches of interest are the later San Francesco, Sant'Egidio and the Chiesa del Gesù.

== Culture ==
Moncalieri is devoted to Beato Bernardo: around the day dedicated to him (July 12), a historical reconstruction of his arrival in Moncalieri from Baden-Baden in 1458 is held.

Libraries and Research Centers

- Biblioteca Europea di Cultura "Victor Del Litto"
- C.I.R.V.I. (Centro Interuniversitario di Ricerche sul Viaggio in Italia)

== Notable people ==
- Lorenzo Lucca (born 2000), footballer
- Carlo Pinsoglio (born 1990), goalkeeper
- Pietro Canonica (1869 – 1959), sculptor and senator for life
- Luca Frigo (born 1993), ice hockey player
- Gabriele Ponte (born 1982), DJ and producer

== International relations ==
=== Twin towns – Sister cities ===
Moncalieri is twinned with:

- Baden-Baden, Germany
- Argyroupoli, Greece
