= Stollhofen =

Town in Baden-Württemberg, Germany

Coordinates: 48.766034°N 8.049202°E

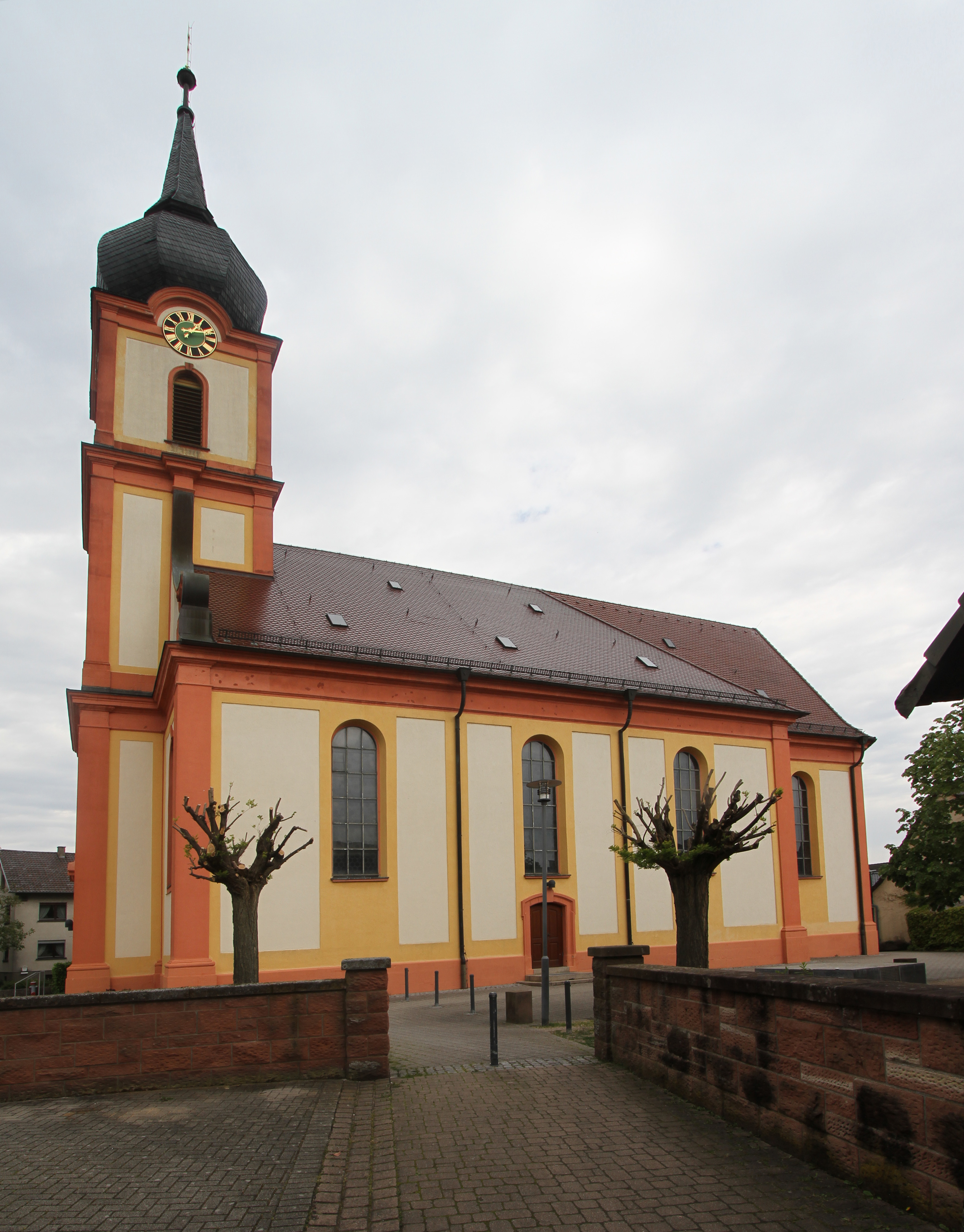
St Erhard's church, Stollhofen

Stollhofen is a town in the Rheinmünster municipality, Rastatt district, Baden-Württemberg, Germany. It lies on the river Sulzbach, and was first mentioned in documents in 1154 and given city status in the 13th century.

It gives its name to the Lines of Stollhofen, a 10-mile defensive line between Stollhofen and Bühl constructed in 1703 during the War of the Spanish Succession. The town was captured in 1707 and its fortifications demolished.
