= Rheinmünster =

- Municipality
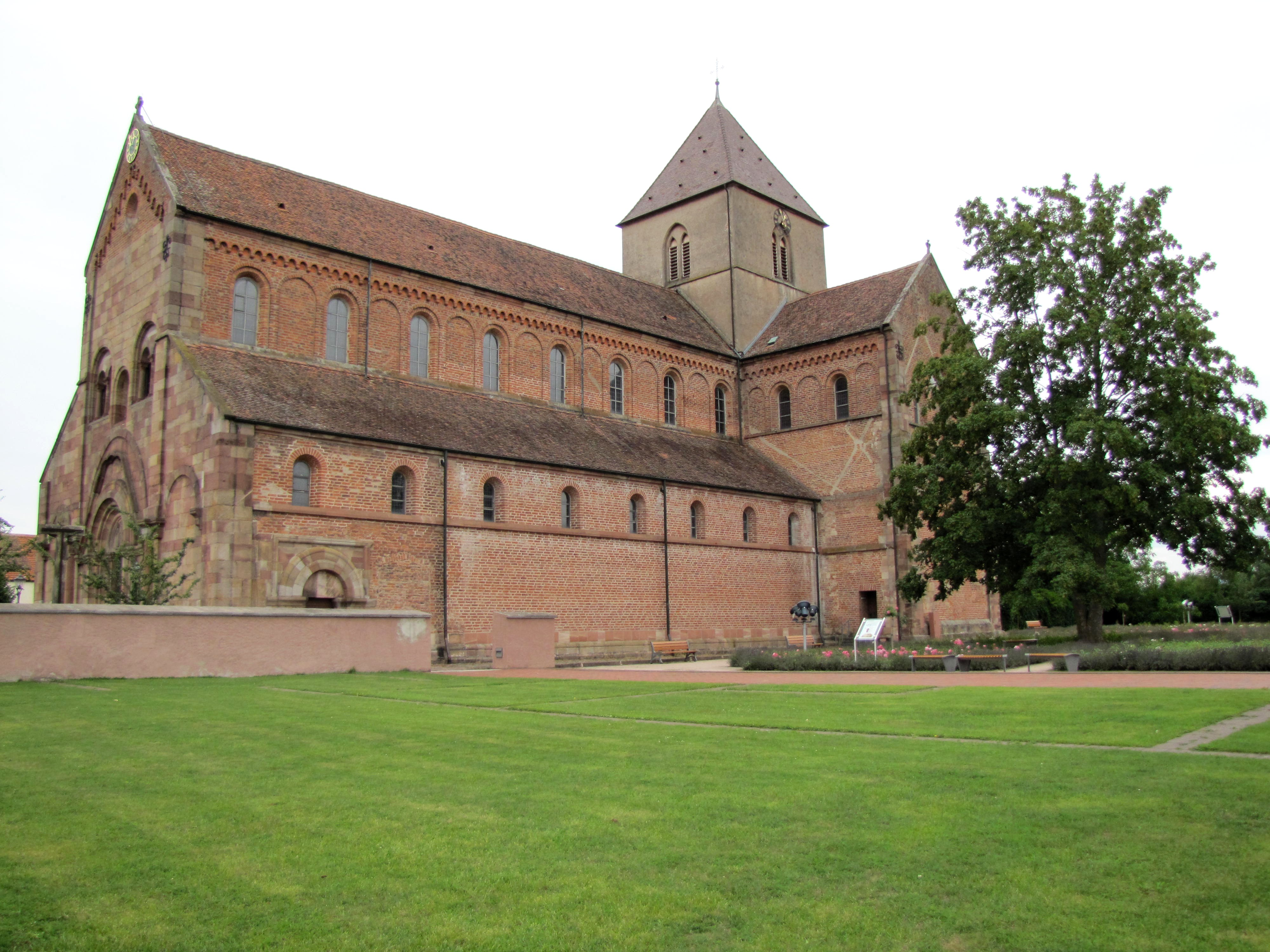
- Schwarzach Monastery, Church of Saints Peter and Paul

- Coat of arms

- Location of Rheinmünster within Rastatt district
- Interactive map of Rheinmünster
- Location within Germany Location within Baden-Württemberg
- Coordinates: 48°45′55″N 08°02′58″E
- Country: Germany
- State: Baden-Württemberg
- Admin. region: Karlsruhe
- District: Rastatt

Government
  - Mayor (2022–30): Thomas Lachnicht (CDU)

Area
  - Total: 42.47 km^{2} (16.40 sq mi)
- Elevation: 132 m (433 ft)

Population (2025-12-31)
  - Total: 6,433
  - Density: 151.5/km^{2} (392.3/sq mi)
- Time zone: UTC+01:00 (CET)
  - Summer (DST): UTC+02:00 (CEST)
- Postal codes: 77836
- Dialling codes: 07227
- Vehicle registration: RA
- Website: www.rheinmuenster.de

Rheinmünster is a municipality in the district of Rastatt in Baden-Württemberg in Germany. Formed in 1974, the town is an amalgamation of the former independent councils of Greffern, Schwarzach, Soellingen and Stollhofen. The name comes from the Rhine (Rhein), the river neighbouring the town and the cathedral (Münster), a Benedictine abbey that fell to secularisation in 1803.
