= Breistroff-la-Grande =

- Commune
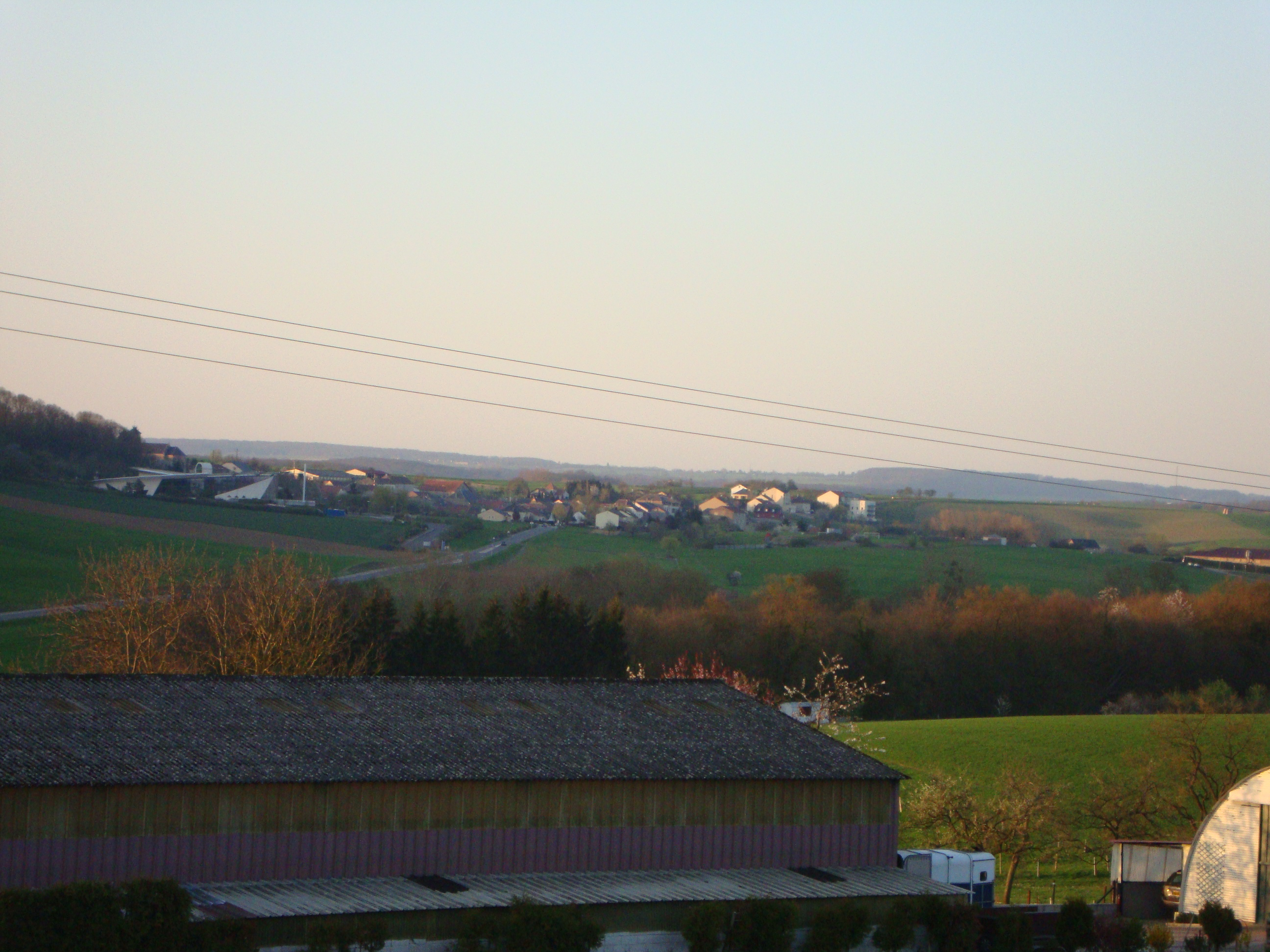
- A general view of Breistroff-la-Grande

- Coat of arms
- Location of Breistroff-la-Grande
- Location within France Location within Grand Est
- Coordinates: 49°27′27″N 6°13′08″E
- Country: France
- Region: Grand Est
- Department: Moselle
- Arrondissement: Thionville
- Canton: Yutz
- Intercommunality: Cattenom et environs

Government
  - Mayor (2022–2026): Michel Schmitt
- Area^{1}: 10.63 km^{2} (4.10 sq mi)
- Elevation: 200 m (660 ft)
- Highest elevation: 242 m (794 ft)
- Lowest elevation: 157 m (515 ft)
- Population (2023): 876
  - Density: 82.4/km^{2} (213/sq mi)
- Time zone: UTC+01:00 (CET)
  - Summer (DST): UTC+02:00 (CEST)
- INSEE/Postal code: 57109 /57570
- ^{1} French Land Register data, which excludes lakes, ponds, glaciers > 1 km^{2} (0.386 sq mi or 247 acres) and river estuaries.

Breistroff-la-Grande (German: Breisdorf) is a commune in the Moselle department in Grand Est in northeastern France.

The localities of Boler (German: Boler) and Évange (German: Ewingen) are incorporated in the commune.

Breistroff-la-Grande is located between Thionville and Luxembourg (Frisange and Mondorf-les-Bains), between Rodemack, Boust, Dodenom/Roussy-le-Bourg, behind the Cattenom Nuclear Power Plant.

- Coat of Arms: Per pale, six bars or and azure, and or a bear rampant sable, collared gules.

To the right, the arms of Rodemack, to the left, the bear of the Saint Maximin Abbey, both of which were lords of the place.

== Geography ==
Breistroff-la-Grande offers a panorama composed of forests, fields, and meadows that are ideal for exploration and walks. The municipality is located a few kilometers from the Franco-Luxembourg border, in the canton of Cattenom.

Hydrography

The municipality is located within the Rhine watershed, part of the Rhine-Meuse basin. It is drained by the Boler stream, the Breistroff stream, the Weihergraben stream, and the Klingenbach stream.

The Boler, with a total length of 22.5 km, originates in the municipality of Zoufftgen and flows into the Moselle at Gavisse, after passing through eight municipalities.

The water quality of the main watercourses in the municipality, especially the Boler stream, can be checked on a dedicated website managed by water agencies and the French Agency for Biodiversity.

== Urbanism ==
Typology

Breistroff-la-Grande is a rural municipality, as it is part of sparsely populated or very sparsely populated municipalities, according to the INSEE municipal density grid

Furthermore, the municipality is part of the attraction area of Luxembourg (French part), of which it is a crown municipality. This area, which includes 115 municipalities, is categorized in areas with 700,000 inhabitants or more (excluding Paris)

Land Use

The land use in the municipality, as indicated by the European land cover database (Corine Land Cover - CLC), is characterized by the importance of agricultural territories (84.5% in 2018), a proportion nearly equivalent to that of 1990 (85.7%). The detailed breakdown in 2018 is as follows: arable land (45%), meadows (32.7%), forests (11.8%), heterogeneous agricultural areas (6.8%), urbanized areas (3.6%). The evolution of land use in the municipality and its infrastructure can be observed on various cartographic representations of the territory: the Cassini map (18th century), the state-major map (1820-1866), and the IGN aerial maps or photos for the current period (1950 to today).

== Toponymy ==
Bistorff (1450), Bresdorff (17th century), Breystroff (1606), Breistorff (1616), Breisdorff (1681), Brestroff (1735), Brensdorff and Brenstorff (1740), Breistroff la Grande (1793), Braistroff (Cassini map).

In Lorraine Franconian: Grouss-Breeschtrëf and Grouss-Breeschdrëf. In German: Breisdorf (1871-1918).

Evange: Effingen (1450), Elfingen (1572), Ewinges and Euwingen (1681), Eving (1756), Ewingen-sous-Breisdorf. Ewingen in German. Iewéngen and Iewéng in Lorraine Franconian.

Boler: Boler (1606), Boulers/Boullers (1681), Bollers (18th century). Bouler in Lorraine Franconian.

Linguistic

The Francic dialect of Rodemack differs very little from that spoken in Esing, Faulbach, Semming, Fixem, Évange, Boler, Basse-Parthe, Haute-Parthe, and Boust. These ten localities have nearly the same vowel system and the same number of diphthongs (Rodemack's dialect has 10), forming a small linguistic area where only a few words differ within this area.

Furthermore, the diphthong [ëu] present in Évange corresponds to the long vowel [ö] present in Breistroff-la-Grande. In other words, the diphthong [ëu] exists in the dialect of Évange but does not exist in the dialect of Breistroff-la-Grande.

== History ==
1. Prehistoric Stone Tools: Discoveries of prehistoric stone tools dating from the Middle Paleolithic to the Neolithic periods.

2. Protohistoric Silo: Unearthing of a protohistoric silo, fragments of ceramics, and a grain millstone from the Iron Age.

3. Roman Road: Identification of a Roman road connecting Metz to the imperial city of Trier.

4. Gallo-Roman Sites: Several sites with evidence of Gallo-Roman habitation, including ceramics and Gallo-Roman tiles.

5. Gallo-Roman Villa Remains: Remnants of a Gallo-Roman villa cellar, along with a nearby well that was filled in during the early Middle Ages (carinated vase).

6. Historical Dependence: The village was part of the former county and later duchy of Luxembourg, and it had dependencies on the seigniories of Cattenom and Rodemack.

Through the western part of the territory runs in a straight line a 3,460-meter-long Roman road to the Luxembourg border.

The village once belonged to the Diocese of Metz.

In 1769, it was annexed by France. In 1810, the two villages of Boler and Évange (Ewingen) were incorporated.

By the Treaty of Frankfurt of 10 May 1871 the village was returned to Germany, where it was assigned to the district of Lorraine in the Reichsland Alsace-Lorraine. After World War I, the region had to be ceded to France in 1919 under the provisions of the Treaty of Versailles. During World War II, the region was occupied by the German Wehrmacht.

== Politics and administration ==
List of successive mayors for the specified period:

- March 1989 to March 1995: Jean-Paul Jacquot
- March 1995 to March 2001: Gérard Theis
- March 2001 to 2002: Jean-Pierre Marx
- March 2003 to 2022: Gérard Theis
- 2022 to Present: Gérard Michel Schmitt

== Demography ==
Historical population
Year	Pop.	±% p.a.
1968	277	—
1975	281	+0.21%
1982	320	+1.87%
1990	338	+0.69%
1999	416	+2.33%
2007	551	+3.58%
2012	608	+1.99%
2017	698	+2.80%
2023	876	+3.86%
Source: INSEE

== Local culture and heritage ==
Civil Buildings

1. Moulin de Boler: Reconstructed in 1787, with the date inscribed on the lintel of the pedestrian door. It is already mentioned on a map from the first half of the 18th century.

2. Moulin de Mausmühl (Mausmühl Mill).

Religious Buildings

1. Église Sainte-Catherine (Saint Catherine's Church): Built in 1514 on a rocky promontory, on the foundations of an old chapel. The original chapel was constructed by the Templars between 1100 and 1300.

2. Chapelle Sainte-Barbe (Saint Barbara's Chapel) in Boler: Founded in the 15th century, it has housed sculptures by the sculptor Nicolas Greff since 1707.

3. Calvaire (Calvary) in the hamlet of Évange: Dating back to 1540, it features fleur-de-lis motifs at its ends, a feature missing in most similar calvaries.

4. Cross on the path to Boler: Connected to the legend of crows pecking out the eyes of a wolf.

5. Monument aux morts (War Memorial).

== See also ==
Communes of the Moselle department
