= Philip III of Baden-Rodemachern =

Philip III, Margrave of Baden-Rodemachern
- Born: 15 August 1567; Rodemachern
- Died: 6 November 1620 (aged 53); Hochburg Castle in Emmendingen
- Noble family: House of Zähringen
- Father: Christopher II, Margrave of Baden-Rodemachern
- Mother: Princess Cecilia of Sweden

Philip III, Margrave of Baden-Rodemachern (15 August 1567 in Rodemachern – 6 November 1620 at Hochburg Castle in Emmendingen) was Margrave of Baden-Rodemachern from 1588 until his death.

== Life ==
Philip III was the second son of Christopher II and Princess Cecilia of Sweden.

He inherited Baden-Rodemachern after the death of his brother Edward Fortunatus in 1600, and took up residence at Ettlingen Castle.

In 1605, Philip enlisted soldiers to liberate Baden-Baden, which had been occupied by Baden-Durlach since 1594. The attempt failed, and Philip's cousin George Frederick took him prisoner. Philip was held in Durlach, and later at Hochburg Castle, where he died childless in 1620.

== Ancestors ==
Ancestors of Philip III of Baden-Rodemachern

16. Charles I, Margrave of Baden-Baden
8. Christopher I, Margrave of Baden-Baden
17. Catherine of Austria
4. Bernhard III, Margrave of Baden-Baden
18. Philip II of Katzenelnbogen
9. Ottilie of Katzenelnbogen
19. Ottilie of Nassau-Siegen
2. Christopher II, Margrave of Baden-Rodemachern
20. Anthony I, Count of Ligny
10. Charles I, Count of Ligny
21. Françoise de Croÿ-Chimay
5. Françoise of Luxemburg-Brienne
22. Jaques d'Estouteville
11. Charlotte d'Estouteville
23. Gilette de Coetivy
1. Philip III, Margrave of Baden-Rodemachern
24. Johan Kristersson Vasa
12. Erik Johansson Vasa
25. Birgitta Gustafsdotter Sture
6. Gustav I of Sweden
26. Måns Karlsson Eka
13. Cecilia Månsdotter
27. Sigrid Eskilsdotter (Banér)
3. Princess Cecilia of Sweden
28. Abraham Kristiernsson Leijonhuvud
14. Erik Abrahamsson Leijonhufvud
29. Birgitta Månsdotter
7. Margareta Leijonhufvud
30. Erik Karlsson Vasa
15. Ebba Eriksdotter Vasa
31. Anna Karlsdotter Vinstorpa

== Footnotes ==
Philip III of Baden-Rodemachern House of Zähringen Born: 15 August 1567 Died: 6 November 1620
Preceded by Edward Fortunatus	Margrave of Baden-Rodemachern; 1600–1620	Succeeded by Herman Fortunatus
