= Christopher II of Baden-Rodemachern =

Christopher II, Margrave of Baden-Rodemachern
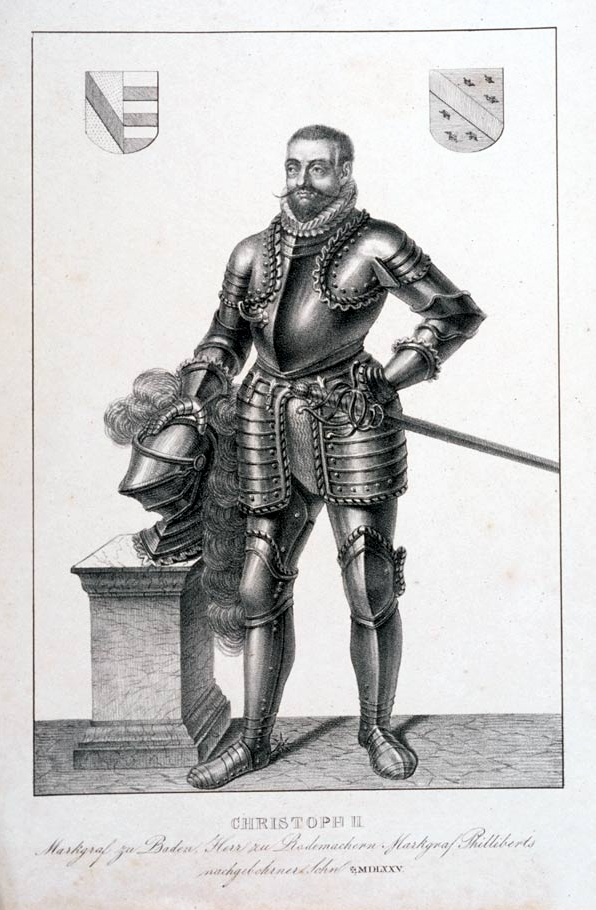
- Margrave Christopher II of Baden-Rodemachern
- Born: 26 February 1537
- Died: 2 August 1575 (aged 38); Rodemachern
- Noble family: House of Zähringen
- Spouse: Princess Cecilia of Sweden
- Issue: Edward Fortunatus; Christopher Gustav; Philip III; Charles; Bernhard; John Charles
- Father: Bernhard III, Margrave of Baden-Baden
- Mother: Franziska of Brienne and Luxemburg

Christoph II of Baden-Rodemachern (26 February 1537 – 2 August 1575, Rodemachern) was the first Margrave of Baden-Rodemachern. He was the second son of Bernhard III of Baden-Baden and his wife Countess Franziska of Brienne and Luxembourg.

== Life ==
=== Early life ===
When Christopher II came of age in 1556, he renounced his right to a part of Baden-Baden to his older brother Philibert in exchange for an annual allowance of 4000 guilders. He also received Rodemachern as an apanage, making him the founder of the elder Baden-Rodemachern line.

=== Extensive excursions ===
He started travelling excessively. From 1557 to 1561, he was in the Netherlands, where he joined the campaigns of the Spanish Army. He went to Sweden in 1564, where he married a sister of King Eric XIV of Sweden. He then returned to Rodemachern, where he built himself a palace and led a wasteful life. In 1565, he travelled to London, where Queen Elizabeth I received him honorably. However, he heaped debt upon debt and when he tried to leave in 1566, he found he couldn't leave the country until the Queen had provided surety. Also in 1566, he inherited the Lordships of Useldange, Pettingen and Roußzy.

He continued to spend too much, and his country suffered from religious unrest. His debts mounted. He went to Sweden, where he served in the army and fought against Denmark. His brother-in-law King John III of Sweden enfeoffed him with the island of Ösel.

=== Death ===
After several years in Sweden, he returned to Rodemachern, where he died in 1575. He was succeeded by his son Edward Fortunatus who was a minor at the time.

== Marriage and issue ==
Margrave Christoph II married on 11 November 1564 Princess Cecilia of Sweden (born: 6 November 1540; died: 27 January 1627), the daughter of King Gustav I of Sweden. They had the following children:

- Edward Fortunatus (born: 17 September 1565; died: 18 June 1600), Margrave of Baden-Rodemachern and later of Baden-Baden
- Christopher Gustav (born: 13 August 1566; died: 18 January 1609)
- Philip III (born: 15 August 1567; died: 6 November 1620, Margrave of Baden-Rodemachern
- Charles (born: 7 March 1569; died: 1590)
- Bernhard (born: December 1570; died: February 1571)
- John Charles (born: 1572, died: 29 January 1599), joined the Knights Hospitaller

== Ancestors ==
Ancestors of Christopher II of Baden-Rodemachern

16. Jacob, Margrave of Baden-Baden
8. Charles I, Margrave of Baden-Baden
17. Catherine de Lorraine
4. Christopher I, Margrave of Baden-Baden
18. Ernest, Duke of Austria
9. Catherine of Austria
19. Cymburgis of Masovia
2. Bernhard III, Margrave of Baden-Baden
20. Philip I, Count of Katzenelnbogen
10. Philip II of Katzenelnbogen
21. Anne of Württemberg
5. Ottilie of Katzenelnbogen
22. Henry II, Count of Nassau-Siegen
11. Ottilie of Nassau-Siegen
23. Genoveva of Virneburg
1. Christopher II, Margrave of Baden-Rodemachern
24. Louis de Luxembourg, Count of Saint-Pol
12. Anthony I, Count of Ligny
25. Jeanne de Bar, Countess of Marle and Soissons
6. Charles I, Count of Ligny
26. Philip I of Croÿ-Chimay
13. Françoise de Croÿ-Chimay
27. Walburga of Moers-Saarwerden
3. Françoise of Luxembourg-Brienne
28. Robert d'Estouteville, Seigneur de Beynes
14. Jaques d'Estouteville
29. Ambroise de Loré, dame d'Ivry
7. Charlotte d'Estouteville
30. Olivier de Coëtivy, Count of Taillebourg
15. Gilette de Coëtivy
31. Marie de Valois

== References and sources ==
- Johann Christian Sachs: Einleitung in die Geschichte der Marggravschaft und des marggrävlichen altfürstlichen Hauses Baden, Karlsruhe, 1769, part 3 at Google Books

Christopher II of Baden-Rodemachern House of Zähringen Born: 26 February 1537 Died: 2 August 1575
Preceded by Philibert as Margrave of Baden-Baden	Margrave of Baden-Rodemachern; 1556-1575	Succeeded by Edward Fortunatus
