= Princess Cecilia of Sweden =

Margravine consort of Baden-Rodemachern (1540–1627)

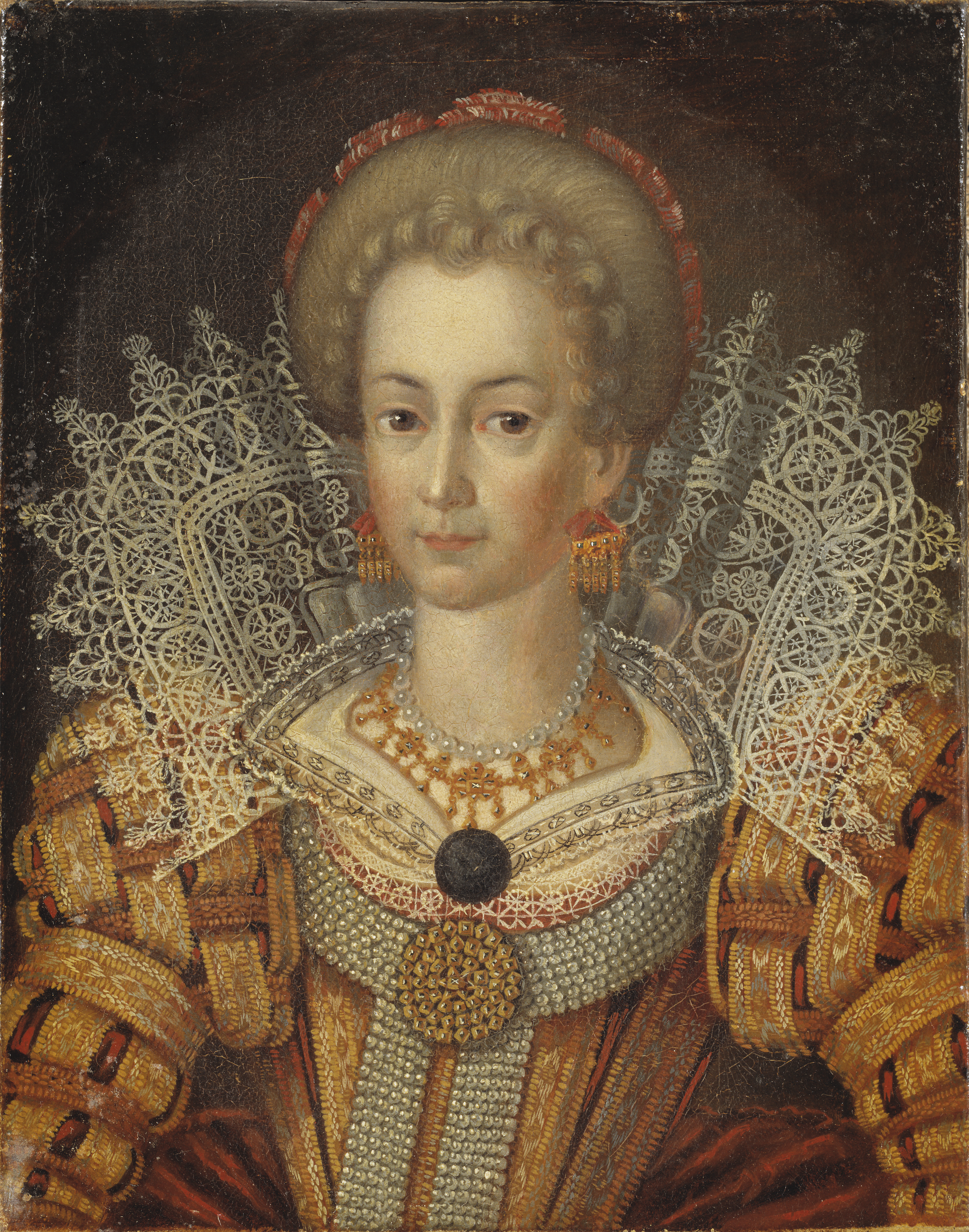
- Portrait of Princess Cecilia, c. 1625

Margravine consort of Baden-Rodemachern
- Tenure: 1564–1575
- Born: 16 November 1540; Stockholm
- Died: 27 January 1627 (aged 86); Brussels
- Spouse: Christopher II, Margrave of Baden-Rodemachern (m. 1559)
- House: Vasa
- Father: Gustav I of Sweden
- Mother: Margareta Leijonhufvud

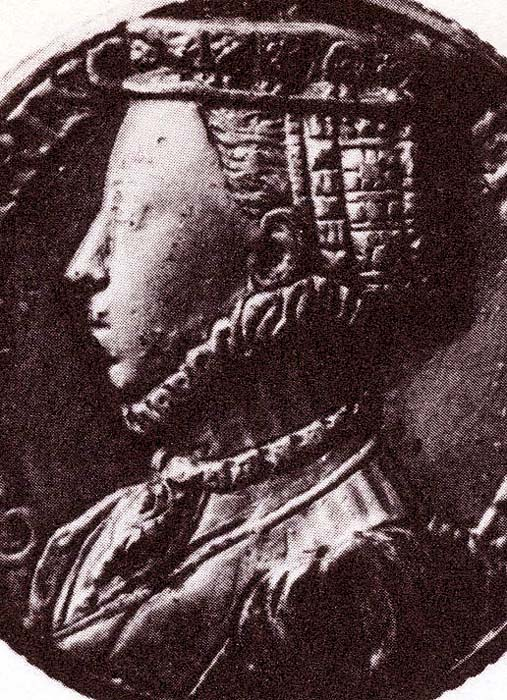
Princess Cecilia of Sweden

Cecilia of Sweden (Swedish: Cecilia Gustavsdotter Vasa; 16 November 1540 – 27 January 1627), was Princess of Sweden as the daughter of King Gustav I and his second wife, Margaret Leijonhufvud, and Margravine of Baden-Rodemachern as the wife of Christopher II, Margrave of Baden-Rodemachern. She is the most famous daughter of Gustav I, known for a courtship scandal in connection with a sister's wedding and for a lengthy stay in England under Elizabeth I where her first child was born.

== Biography ==
=== Early life ===
Cecilia was described as the most beautiful of the daughters of Gustav I, and was frequently mentioned because of her beauty. She has been referred to as somewhat of a Black Sheep of the family, because of the scandals she was involved in. During her early childhood, she, as well as her siblings in the royal nursery, were primarily under the care of her mother's trusted nurse, Brigitta Lars Anderssons, her mother's cousin Lady Margareta and the noble widow Ingrid Amundsdotter. After the death of her mother in 1551, she as well as her siblings were placed in the care of Christina Gyllenstierna and then under her aunts Brita and Martha Leijonhufvud before her father's marriage to Catherine Stenbock. They were then under the responsibility of their stepmother and, more precisely, the head lady-in-waiting Anna Hogenskild.

In 1556, she and her sisters were given a dowry of 100.000 daler, had their portraits painted and their personal qualities described in Latin by the court poet Henricus Mollerus and presented on the dynastic marriage market. The same year, her father presented Ostfriesland (East Frisia) with a trading treaty and a marriage alliance. Ostfriesland was chosen because it was strategically placed toward Denmark, and because the Calvinistic Emden was a rival to Lubeck and a treaty could break the domination of the Hanseatic league in Sweden. In 1557, the trading treaty was completed, and in 1558, Edzard II, ruler of East Frisia visited Sweden to meet Cecilia and her sister Catherine Vasa and chose one of them to complete the marriage treaty, and Edzard chose Catherine.

The wedding between Catherine and Edzard took place in Stockholm 1 October 1559. In November, Catherine and Edzard left for Ostfriesland. Upon their journey through Sweden, they were accompanied by Cecilia and the brother of Edzard, John II of Ostfriesland. While staying at the residence of Prince Magnus in Vadstena Castle on the way, a great scandal erupted when John was discovered in Cecilia's chamber without his trousers. The scandal became famous under the name Vadstenabullret (Vadstena Rumble). The king had been reluctant to let Cecilia follow, as there were at the time negotiations of a marriage between her and George John of Palatine Veldenz, and asked for her to return early: he also asked Catherine and Edzard to remain in Sweden for the winter, so he asked Magnus to delay their departure.

Several nights in a row, the palace guards observed a man climbing in through the window of Cecilia's bedroom. After this had happened four times a row, they informed her brother Prince Eric, who asked his brother Magnus and his courtiers to advise him. They decided to keep Cecilia's window under guard, so that the man in question could not be in a position to deny the matter if he was caught. When the same thing happened the night of 13–14 December, Eric sent Charles de Mornay with some guards to arrest the man, and when they entered Cecilia's bedroom, they found the brother of the groom, John II of Ostfriesland, in Cecilia's bedroom without any hose (pants) on. Eric had John imprisoned, held interrogations then sent John to the king, who imprisoned him in Örbyhus Castle. The 17 December, Catherine and Edzard were sent to Västerås Castle and placed under house arrest, while Eric and Cecilia were both recalled to Stockholm.

Cecilia accused her father of having beaten her and ripped her hair off. The king is said to have cried when he told the story to his wife. He accused Catherine and Erik for not having restrained Cecilia as they should, he had Charles de Mornay arrested and reprimanded Erik for having caused the scandal by his way of handling the whole affair by not having dealt with it in secret but instead exposed it in public. Catherine was allowed to see the king in June 1560: she acted as mediator and tried to issue John's, her own and her consort's release, protested against the confiscation of Cecilia's jewelry and asked the queen, Catherine Stenbock to speak for her, which it seems as the queen did. The mother of John had several foreign powers send ambassadors to Sweden to speak for John's release. Erik suggested that Cecilia and John be forced to marry each other, but the king did not like the idea and it is unknown whether the suggestion was ever presented to the two. In the summer of 1560, John was released after having been forced to swear before the monarch and the royal council that nothing sexual had taken place between him and Cecilia. The brothers of Cecilia stamped a coin which pictured her as Susanna in the bath, indicating that she was as innocent as the legendary Susanna of the Bible.

In 1563, Eric XIV discovered Cecilia and her sister having a party in their rooms in the middle of the night. This led to an argument between Cecilia and Eric. It is presumed that it was because of this incident, as well as the Vadstena scandal, that Eric issued a new protocol for the royal court, in which his sisters were to be placed under more a strict observation to prevent them from damaging their reputation, such as leaving the palace at night or early morning or accepting guests at night or letters without permission. This was particularly in regard to Cecilia, as Eric accused her of mixing with questionable people. The rules also banned the princesses from receiving supplicants and meddle in politics on their behalf, or to in any way interfere in affairs of state: the same year, Cecilia, Anna and Sophia had sent a letter of protest to Eric regarding his imprisonment of their brother John, something he had a very negative reaction to. Cecilia had protested openly toward these regulations.

Cecilia and her sister Anna were long supposed to be married to Louis of Palatine-Simmern, George John of Palatine-Veldenz or Poppo of Henneberg. The purpose was to make the Vasa Dynasty related to the more influential German families. The negotiation with Georg John was advanced when he chose Anna over her after the Vadstena scandal. In 1561, she was proposed to by Henry, the earl of Arundel. She was willing to accept, but Eric does not seem to have given it much consideration. In 1561 Polish magnate count Jan Tęczyński, who was sent by the Polish king on a diplomatic mission to Sweden and Finland. While at the Swedish court, he fell in love with Cecilia and began courting her. Eric liked the idea, and according to Cecilia, he forced her to agree. After obtaining preliminary consent for the marriage, Jan Tęczyński returned to Poland. In September 1563, he set out by sea with his cousin, also Jan, Tęczyński (the starost of Rohatyn) and their accompanying retinue to finalize his efforts to win Cecilia’s hand. However, the wedding never took place. On their way to Sweden, Tęczyński was imprisoned by the Danes, who were then at war with the Swedes, and died in December 1563 in a prison in Copenhagen.

Cecilia married Christopher II, Margrave of Baden-Rodemachern (1537–1575), in June 1564 in Stockholm. It is noted that the wedding was far less luxurious than that of her sister Anna, and that it seem to have taken place without much negotiation: the first contract had been signed as late as March the same year. Neither does there seem to have been any political purpose behind the marriage.

=== English journey ===
Immediately after the wedding, she traveled to England on an official state visit. She arrived in the autumn of 1565 after traveling some 400 miles by water and 750 miles on ice and snow. Cecilia had been engaged in a correspondence with Elizabeth for several years and seems to have felt admiration for her on a personal level. She successfully asked Elizabeth for an invitation to England already in 1562, and learned to speak English from English people in Sweden. Cecilia traveled to England through Estonia, Prussia, Poland and Germany (without visiting the home of her consort) to Antwerp in the Spanish Netherlands. She managed to meet her imprisoned brother John before her departure, and when she arrived in Swedish Estonia, Eric asked his governor in Reval to keep her under supervision, as he suspected her to be more loyal to their brother John than to him. In the Duchy of Prussia, she successfully asked the duke to work with the Danish monarch to free her brother John. During her stay with her sister Catherine in East Frisia, she is believed to have discussed the imprisonment of John, as Catherine soon after sent Eric a furious letter about his imprisonment of John.

Cecilia left for England from Calais in September 1565. She was given Bedford House in London as her residence, where she was welcomed by the Countess of Sussex and the wife of William Cecil. After a couple of days rest, Cecilia made her formal entrance to London on 11 September, dressed in black velvet trimmed with silver and surrounded by her ladies-in-waiting dressed in red. After this, Elizabeth visited Cecilia in Bedford House. According to the Spanish ambassador to England, Cecilia and Elizabeth got along very nicely. They visited weddings and dinners together, at Christmas 1565, Cecilia received communion directly after Elizabeth, and her consort was given an allowance as long as he allowed Cecilia to remain in England. While there she delivered her first child, Edward, who was carried to his christening by Elizabeth. One of her maids-of-honor was Helena Snakenborg (later Marchioness of Northampton), who was to stay at the English court when Cecilia left in May 1566.

Cecilia's visit to England was part of an attempt to convince Queen Elizabeth I to marry her half-brother King Eric XIV. She was also to recruit English pirates to attack hostile Danish, German and Polish ships on the Baltic Sea. In January 1566, Eric also gave her the task of negotiating an alliance between Sweden and England to assist Sweden in its attempt to have peace in the war between Sweden and Denmark. There are conflicting reports as to how she managed these negotiations. As for the marriage question, some reports claim that she tried to go through the Earl of Leicester. However, Cecilia had her own agenda, and also tried to make Elizabeth interfere in the matter of her brother John's imprisonment, and in October, Elizabeth wrote to Eric and asked him to release John. She upheld a contact with the Duke of Prussia regarding her attempts to free John. She was also in close contact with the Spanish ambassador at the English court, because the lands of her consort were partially placed in Spanish Luxembourg.

The relationship between Cecilia and Elizabeth was damaged because of Cecilia's close contact with the Spanish ambassador, and because of the scandals caused by her debts. Cecilia acquired enormous debts because of the style she felt was necessary to live according to her status at court. In November 1566, her consort was forced to leave for Germany in an attempt to borrow money for her. Her greatest creditors were George North and John Diamond (also called Dymoch): she also used the doctor Cornelius Alnetanus who borrowed her money and pawned things for her. Alnetanus was previously exiled from court by Elizabeth for trying to convince her that he could make gold, and Elizabeth imprisoned him after he violated her order not to have anything to do with Cecilia. In March, Christopher returned to England in secret and tried to abduct Cecilia from her creditors, but was discovered and put in prison by his creditors. Elizabeth had him freed, but this definitely ended the friendship between Cecilia and the queen. In April 1566, Cecilia pawned her jewelry and wardrobe to finance their trip to Baden. In Dover, however, they were stopped and most of their luggage was confiscated in the names of their creditors North and Diamond. However, not only was Cecilia's and Christopher's luggage confiscated, but also that of Cecilia's Swedish ladies-in-waiting (who had no debts), and Cecilia and her courtiers regarded themselves to have been subjected to theft. She was pregnant at this point, and when she finally reached Rodemachern (now Rodemack) her son was born handicapped, for which she blamed her creditors for the rest of her life.

=== Countess of Arboga ===
In August 1566, Cecilia arrived to Baden-Rodemachern, where she stayed for five years. The religious war in the Netherlands was ongoing and the troops of the Duke of Alba moved around the territory of her residence and occupied her dower lands, which caused her economic distress. In 1569, the second half of Baden, Baden-Baden, was inherited by the underage nephew of her consort and placed under the rule of his Catholic relative Albert V of Bavaria, who treated the Protestants with brutality. Cecilia wrote to her brother John III of Sweden and stated that she feared for their safety, and asked for permission to return to Sweden.

Upon their arrival in Kalmar in Sweden in 1571, she was informed of the arrival of an English merchant, John Dymosh (also called John Diamond), with a fleet of 50 ships. This was her former creditor, who had confiscated her property in lieu of debts upon her departure. Cecilia was given permission from John to arrest Dymosh, whose fleet was confiscated – he was to spend five years in prison. Christopher left Sweden soon after to fulfill his promise to John in exchange for his permission to live in Sweden: to provide Sweden with mercenaries upon the ongoing war with Russia. He never returned.

In Sweden, Cecilia was granted the city of Arboga as her personal fief, and styled herself Countess of Arboga. Cecilia had the authority to manage the trading policy and the legal system and see to it that the royal laws were respected, and she also managed certain taxation on import and export. In addition to earning income on mining and farming, Cecilia was also active within piracy. One of her missions in Sweden was to have her dowry finally paid to her. John III could not afford to do so. Cecilia was given a fleet of ships from John as partial payment of her dowry, and used this fleet to attack ships on the Baltic Sea. John had several licences issued to pirates on the Baltic Sea with permission to attack ships on their way to Russia, often English and Dutch, to disturb Russian trade during the war between Sweden and Russia. Cecilia, however, also came in conflict with John because she violated her permission by also attacking ships from friendly nations, such as Danish, which created tension between Sweden and Denmark.

In the autumn of 1573, the Mornay plot was prepared to assassinate John III. The plot was led by Charles de Mornay, who was in contact with Christina of Denmark and the French ambassador in Copenhagen Charles Dancay. John III was to be killed during a swords dance performed by Scottish mercenaries at the party which was to be given in October that year before the Scottish mercenaries departure to the Baltic. After the assassination, Duke Charles was to be placed upon the throne. Charles de Mornay, who had previously been the favorite of Eric XIV, promised that he knew the location of Eric's alleged hidden gold reserve, which he would reveal after the coup in exchange for better conditions for Eric in prison. However, the plot did not materialize because at the party, de Mornay never dared to give the sign to the mercenaries to take action. In September 1574, the plot was revealed and Charles de Mornay was arrested, interrogated and executed. It was never made clear who participated in the plot. However, it is noted, that the suspected conspirators Hogenskild Bielke, Gustaf Banér and Pontus De la Gardie often gathered at meetings in the apartment of Princess Elizabeth, meetings where Princess Cecilia had also frequently been seen, and the two sisters and their brother Charles were somewhat compromised though they were never accused. It seem that John III suspected her to have prepared a rebellion against him: in 1573, he gave order that Cecilia was not to be allowed in the Stockholm Castle during his absence, and in 1574, after the plot had been exposed, he gave orders to the governors in Östergötland to keep Cecilia under watch and not to let her have access to any royal castle.

On 2 August 1575, her absent consort Christopher died, and her under age son Edvard Fortunatus formally succeeded him as Margrave of Baden-Rodemarchern, albeit in his absence with her in Sweden. According to the marriage contract, Cecilia was secured the right to be regent should her son succeed while still minor. However, upon the death of Christopher, her former in-laws had the documents which secured her rights confiscated and took control over her dower lands as well as the rule of the entire Baden-Rodemarchern officially as the guardians and regents of her son. When Cecilia sent representatives to Baden to secure her rights in 1576, they were turned away and her authority as regent was not acknowledged. Cecilia converted to Catholicism as a way to secure her and her sons rights to the domains of her late spouse. Her conversion likely took place in connection to the visit of the papal legate Antonio Possevino to Sweden in 1577.

In the summer of 1578, a Spanish ambassador, Francisco de Eraso, arrived to Sweden. John III wished to make an alliance with Spain to prevent Denmark and Poland to interfere with the Swedish war against Russia. He also wished Spanish assistance to secure the Italian lands which he had the right to after his mother-in-law Bona Sforza. John III suggested that Cecilia, being a Catholic, could be made governor in one of the Spanish lands in Europe, preferably Luxembourg. Cecilia invited Eraso to Arboga and issued her own negotiations with him. She supported the plans of making her Spanish governor and offered her own pirate fleet to serve in the Spanish war in the Netherlands. This caused a conflict with her Protestant brother Charles, who begun to attack her fleet with his own. According to Eraso's reports, Cecilia acted as a valuable informer to Spain. When John's negotiations with Spain failed, he became suspicious of Cecilia's dealings with Eraso. John had Eraso placed in house arrest and banned him from any contact with Cecilia. In the night of 17–18 June 1579, Cecilia bribed her way in to Stockholm in secret and attempted to see Eraso. The alarm rang, and Cecilia and her retinue was captured by the guard and brought to John, which caused a great scene between the siblings. Shortly after, Cecilia returned to Germany, followed by the exiled Francisco de Eraso.

=== Baden ===
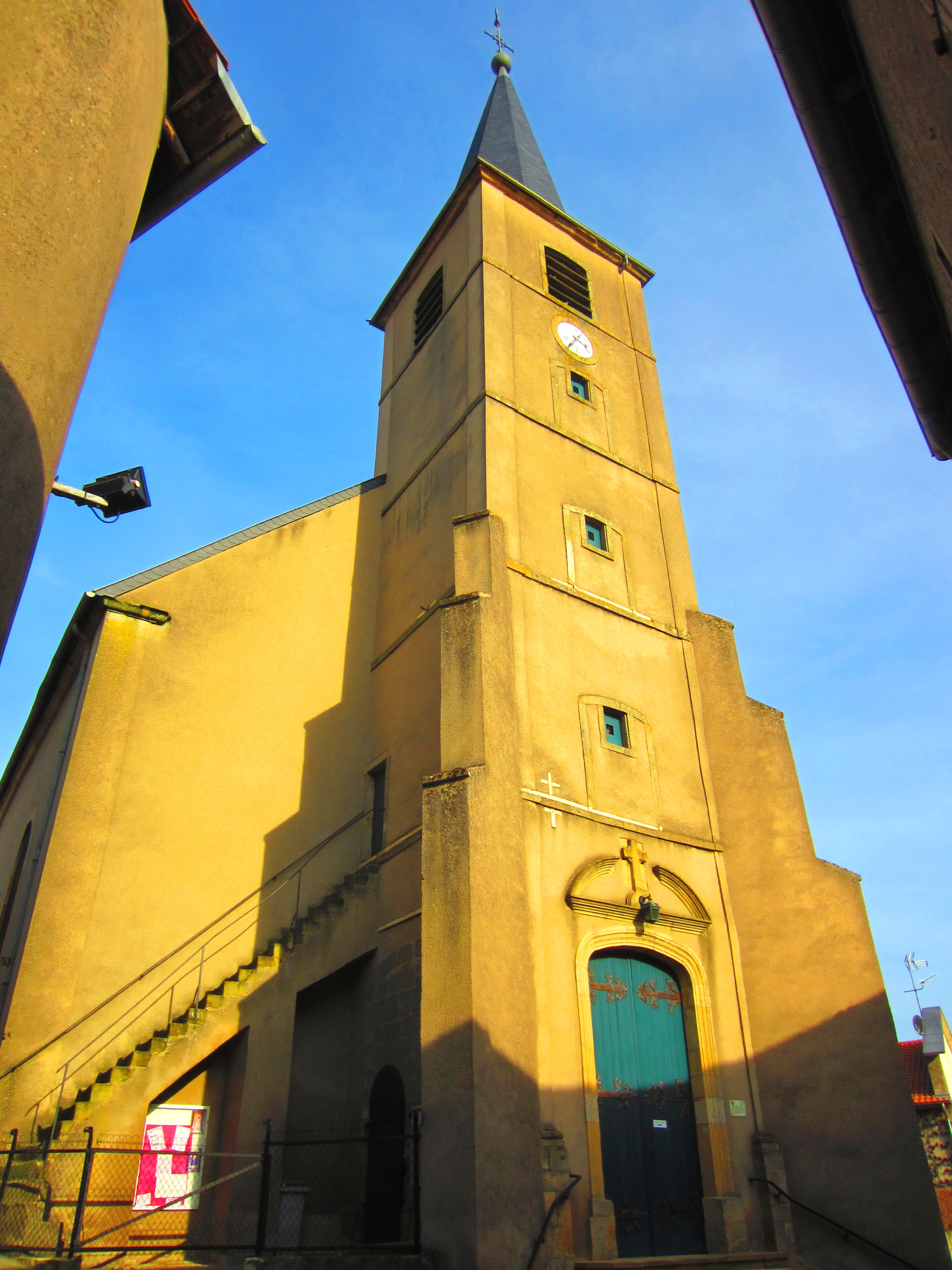
Church of Saint Nicholas in Rodemack, France, where Cecilia's remains rest.

Upon her return to Baden in 1579, Cecilia sought to take control over her dower lands and of Baden-Rodemachen from the relatives of her late consort in name of her son. Francisco de Eraso and Cecilia lived together in Baden for a time before Eraso continued on his way to Spain. During this time, she gave birth to a daughter, which caused a scandal as she had by that time been a widow for four years. The daughter, who was fathered by Eraso, was placed in the convent of Liethentahl by Edvard Fortunatus against Cecilia's will, and she was not allowed to see her again until 1622: she took the vows as an adult and is known only by her name as a nun, Charitas.

In her struggle against the family of her late consort, she was supported by the papal legate Antonio Possevino, Eraso and John III: her other brother Charles IX, however, broke with her after the birth of Charitas. She also had her sons placed in care of the Jesuits. Her alliance with Spain, however, eventually made her lose the support of John as well, who in 1581 refused her to return to Sweden. Cecilia lived on the income of her Swedish estate, but this was confiscated by John in 1585 after her opposition to his marriage with Gunilla Bielke.

In 1588, her son Edvard Fortunatus took control of Baden-Rodemachen. He confiscated Cecilia's dower lands, and as both he and Cecilia amounted huge debts. Cecilia became a known diplomat when she courted various Catholic power holders on behalf of herself and her son in economical and political matters on constant journeys. This became even more necessary in 1596, when her son was deposed by the Protestant line of the Baden dynasty after his unequal 1593 marriage to Maria van Eicken. She is described as a talented diplomat with a great wit and verbal talent. She courted her nephew the Polish monarch, the German Roman Emperor and the Pope. As margravine within the Holy Roman Empire, she had the right to a seat at the empirical German-Roman assembly, a right she also used: in 1613, she addressed the Imperial German Roman Assembly in Regensburg in favor of her second son, who had been imprisoned by the Protestant line of Baden. She was often successful as she secured favorable sentences in her favor at the Imperial Court, but as the sentences could not be carried out in territories which was de jure but not de facto controlled by the Emperor, they were of little practical value. Cecilia was a target of Protestant propaganda for her conversion to Catholicism and political activity. The perhaps most known slander against her was a story by Everhard van Reyd: he claimed that she hosted a brothel in Antwerp, and that her son had to drag her from it in her hair (1590). She was also compared to Empress Messalina.

Cecilia lived in a difficult situation, as she was forced to support herself by loans due to her lack of income and was often hunted by her creditors. In 1618, her estate was taken and she fled by carriage to make contact with the archbishop of Trier in Luxembourg: to escape her persecutors, she was forced to abandon her carriage and jump over the border to Lorraine. Upon the outbreak of the Thirty Years' War, the Protestant line of the Baden dynasty was deposed by the Imperial army and her grandson was as a Catholic allowed to take control over the entire territory of Baden. Cecilia was able to return to her estate in Rodemachen and spend her last years in comfort.

Cecilia Gustavsdotter died in Brussels on January 27, 1627 at the age of 86 and is buried beneath the floor of the church in Rodemack.

== Issue ==
- Edward Fortunatus, Margrave of Baden-Rodemachern (1565–1600)
- Kristoffer Gustav of Baden-Rodemachern (1566–1609)
- Philip III, Margrave of Baden-Rodemachern (1567–1620)
- Karl of Baden-Rodemachern (1569–1590)
- Bernhard of Baden-Rodemachern (1570–1571)
- Johann Karl of Baden-Rodemachern (1572–1599) in the Knights Hospitaller
- Charitas Cecilia (1579–1629), illegitimate daughter, placed in a convent.

== Ancestors ==
Ancestors of Princess Cecilia of Sweden

Johan Kristiersson (Vasa)
Erik Johansson (Vasa)
Birgitta Gustafsdotter (Sture)
Gustav I of Sweden (Vasa)
Måns Karlsson (Eka)
Cecilia Månsdotter (Eka)
Sigrid Eskilsdotter (Banér)
Cecilia of Sweden (Vasa)
Abraham Kristiernsson (Leijonhuvud)
Erik Abrahamsson (Leijonhufvud)
Birgitta Månsdotter (Natt och Dag)
Margareta Leijonhufvud
Erik Karlsson (Vasa)
Ebba Eriksdotter (Vasa)
Anna Karlsdotter (Vinstorpa)

Vacant Title last held by Mechthild of Bavaria	Margravine consort of Baden-Rodemachen; 1564–1575	Vacant Title next held by Maria van Eicken
