= Philip III =

Philip III may refer to:

- Philip III of Macedon (c. 359–317 BC)
- Philip III of France (1245–1285)
- Philip III of Navarre (1328–1342)
- Philip III of Taranto, Prince of Achaea (1364–1373)
- Philip III, Duke of Burgundy (1419–1467)
- Philip III, Margrave of Baden-Rodemachern (1567–1620)
- Philip III of Spain (1578–1621)
- Philip III of Portugal (1605–1665)

== See also ==
- Felipe III (disambiguation)
