= Puttelange =

Puttelange may refer to:

== France ==
- Puttelange-aux-Lacs, a commune in the Moselle department
- Puttelange-lès-Thionville, a commune in the Moselle department

== Germany ==
- Puttelange-lès-Sarrelouis, French exonym for a town in Saarland
