= Mondorff =

- Commune
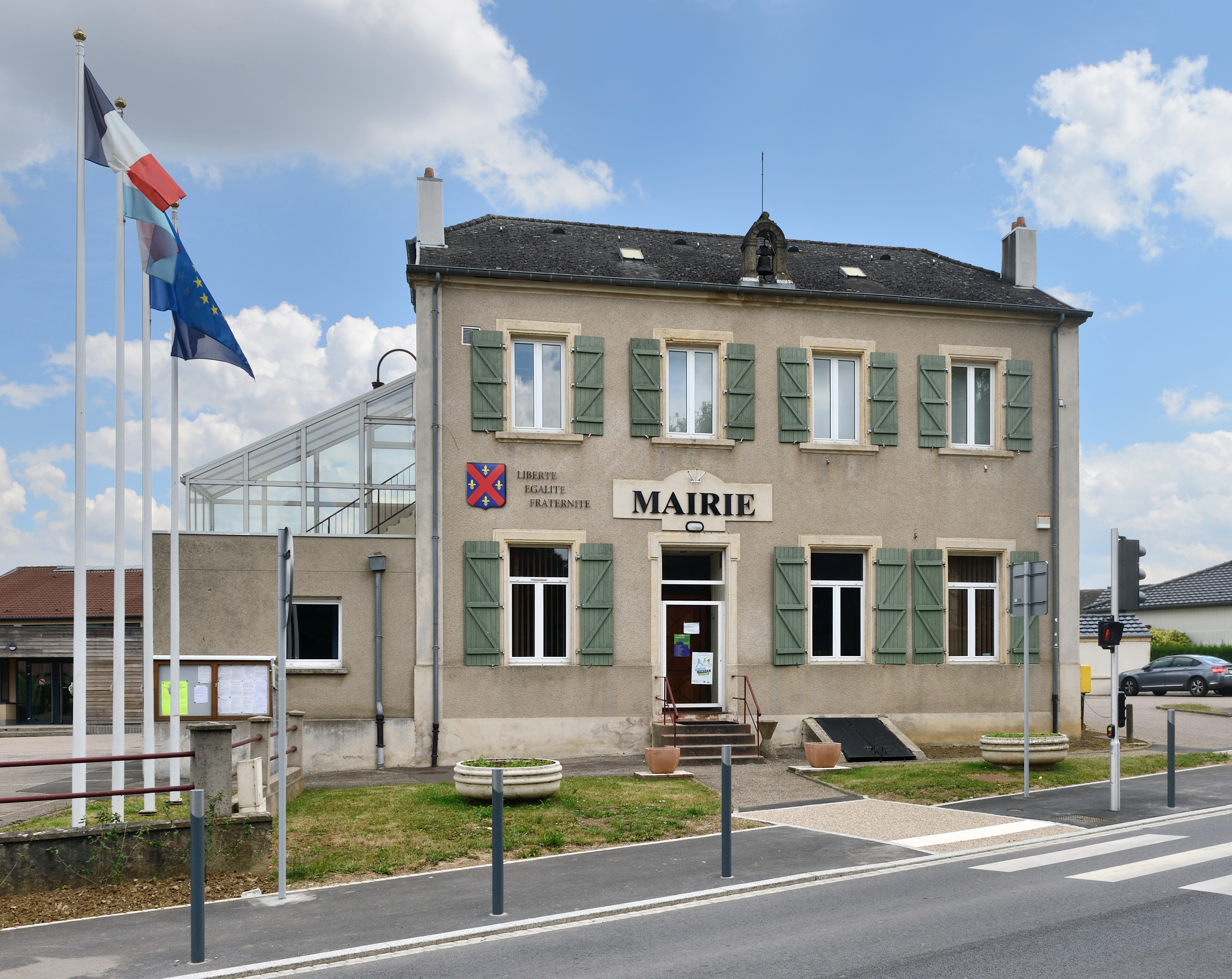
- The town hall in Mondorff

- Coat of arms
- Location of Mondorff
- Location within France Location within Grand Est
- Coordinates: 49°30′14″N 6°16′18″E
- Country: France
- Region: Grand Est
- Department: Moselle
- Arrondissement: Thionville
- Canton: Yutz
- Intercommunality: Cattenom et Environs

Government
  - Mayor (2020–2026): Rachel Zirovnik
- Area^{1}: 3.84 km^{2} (1.48 sq mi)
- Elevation: 192 m (630 ft)
- Highest elevation: 263 m (863 ft)
- Lowest elevation: 187 m (614 ft)
- Population (2023): 609
  - Density: 159/km^{2} (411/sq mi)
- Time zone: UTC+01:00 (CET)
  - Summer (DST): UTC+02:00 (CEST)
- INSEE/Postal code: 57475 /57570
- ^{1} French Land Register data, which excludes lakes, ponds, glaciers > 1 km^{2} (0.386 sq mi or 247 acres) and river estuaries.

Mondorff (French pronunciation: [mɔ̃dɔʁf]; German: Mondorf; Lorraine Franconian: Munnerëf) is a commune in the Moselle department in Grand Est in north-eastern France.

== Proximity of border with Luxembourg ==
It lies on the border with Luxembourg. The town in neighbouring Luxembourg to which it lies adjacent is Mondorf-les-Bains.

A former border control station is now disused.

== Spelling ==
The name of the French commune is notably spelt with a double 'ff' (in contrast with the single 'f' in the French name of the adjacent Luxembourg commune: Mondorf-les-Bains).

== See also ==
- Communes of the Moselle department
