= Entrange =

- Commune
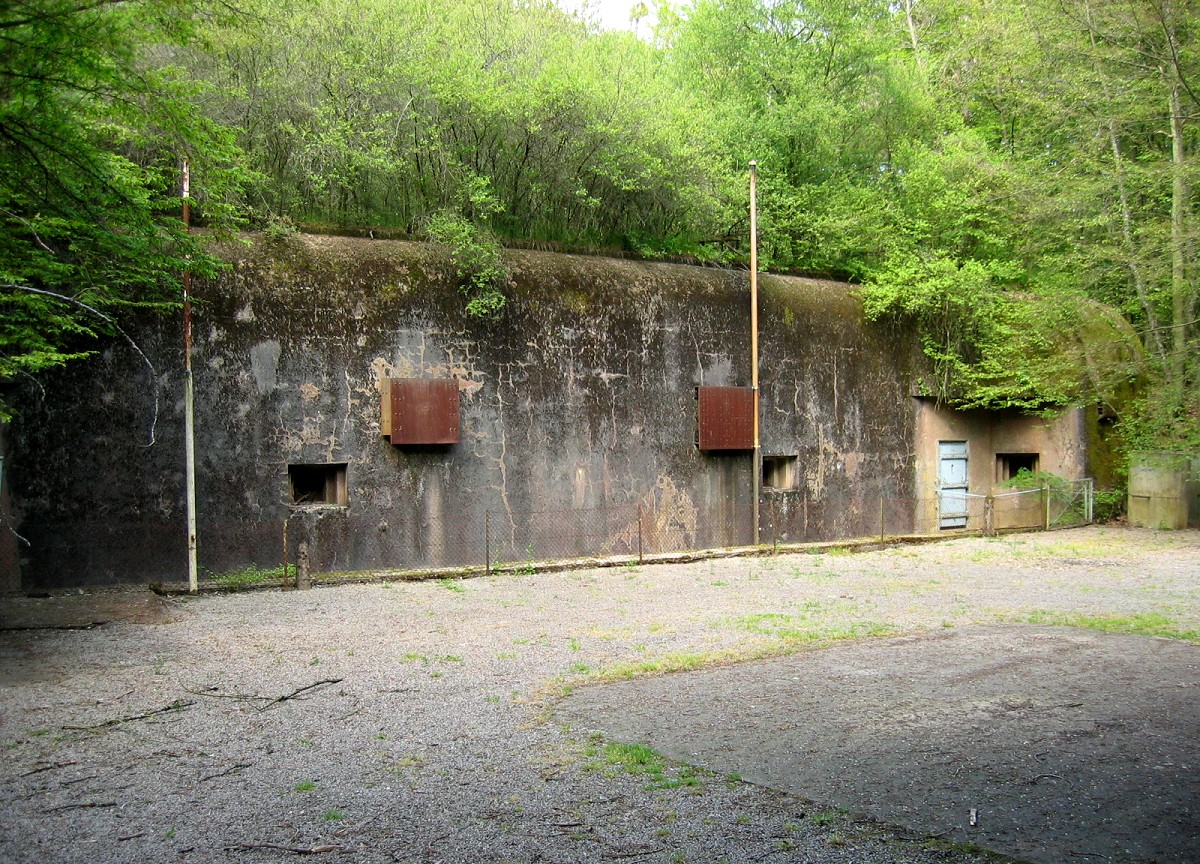
- The Maginot Line at Entrange

- Coat of arms
- Location of Entrange
- Location within France Location within Grand Est
- Coordinates: 49°24′48″N 6°06′18″E
- Country: France
- Region: Grand Est
- Department: Moselle
- Arrondissement: Thionville
- Canton: Yutz
- Intercommunality: CC de Cattenom et Environs

Government
  - Mayor (2020–2026): Michel Hergat
- Area^{1}: 3.99 km^{2} (1.54 sq mi)
- Elevation: 260 m (850 ft)
- Highest elevation: 416 m (1,365 ft)
- Lowest elevation: 186 m (610 ft)
- Population (2023): 1,218
  - Density: 305/km^{2} (791/sq mi)
- Time zone: UTC+01:00 (CET)
  - Summer (DST): UTC+02:00 (CEST)
- INSEE/Postal code: 57194 /57330
- ^{1} French Land Register data, which excludes lakes, ponds, glaciers > 1 km^{2} (0.386 sq mi or 247 acres) and river estuaries.

Entrange (French pronunciation: [ɑ̃tʁɑ̃ʒ]; German: Entringen) is a commune in the Moselle department in Grand Est in north-eastern France.

== See also ==
- Communes of the Moselle department
