= Hagen, Moselle =

Hagen
- Commune
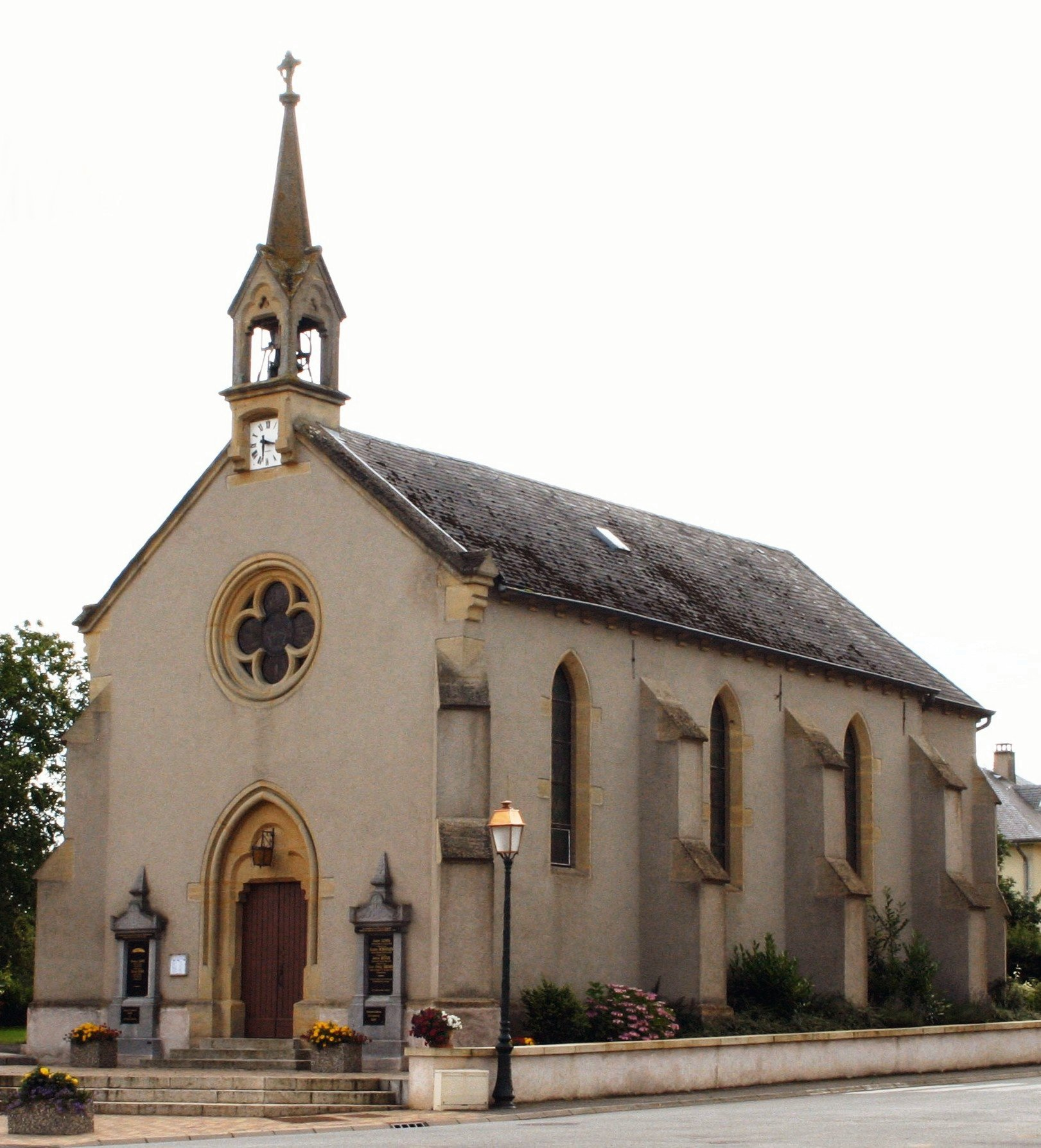
- The church in Hagen

- Coat of arms
- Location of Hagen
- Location within France Location within Grand Est
- Coordinates: 49°29′55″N 6°10′21″E
- Country: France
- Region: Grand Est
- Department: Moselle
- Arrondissement: Thionville
- Canton: Yutz
- Intercommunality: CC de Cattenom et Environs

Government
  - Mayor (2022–2026): Marie-Pierre Lagarde
- Area^{1}: 3.51 km^{2} (1.36 sq mi)
- Elevation: 272 m (892 ft)
- Highest elevation: 290 m (950 ft)
- Lowest elevation: 238 m (781 ft)
- Population (2023): 387
  - Density: 110/km^{2} (286/sq mi)
- Time zone: UTC+01:00 (CET)
  - Summer (DST): UTC+02:00 (CEST)
- INSEE/Postal code: 57282 /57570
- ^{1} French Land Register data, which excludes lakes, ponds, glaciers > 1 km^{2} (0.386 sq mi or 247 acres) and river estuaries.

Hagen (French pronunciation: [aɡən]; Lorraine Franconian: Hoën; German: Hagen) is a commune in the Moselle department in Grand Est in north-eastern France.

== See also ==
- Communes of the Moselle department
