= Berg-sur-Moselle =

Berg-sur-Moselle Bierg
- Commune
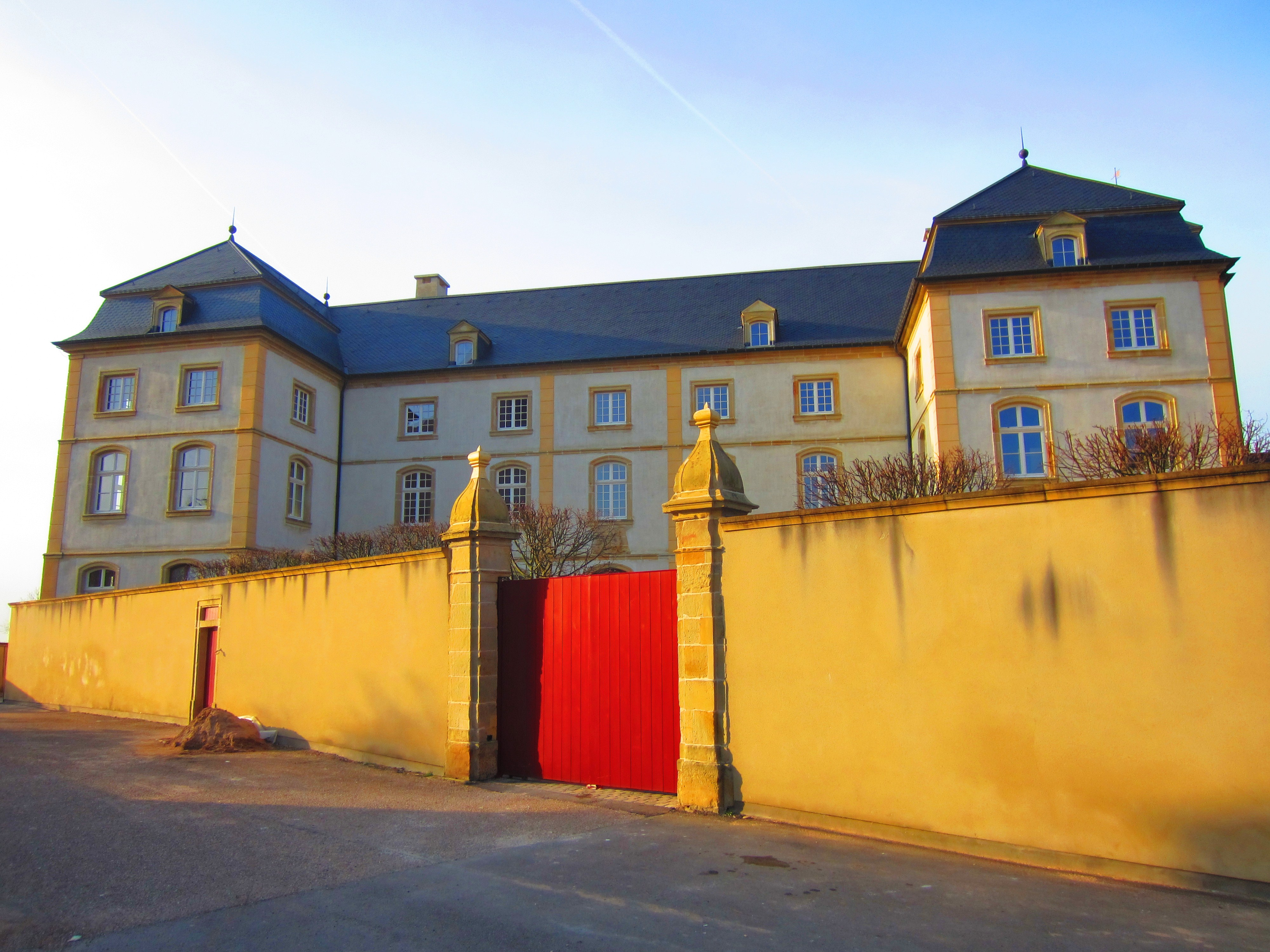
- The chateau in Berg-sur-Moselle

- Coat of arms
- Location of Berg-sur-Moselle
- Location within France Location within Grand Est
- Coordinates: 49°25′52″N 6°18′43″E
- Country: France
- Region: Grand Est
- Department: Moselle
- Arrondissement: Thionville
- Canton: Yutz
- Intercommunality: Cattenom et environs

Government
  - Mayor (2020–2026): Denis Nousse
- Area^{1}: 2.91 km^{2} (1.12 sq mi)
- Elevation: 185 m (607 ft)
- Highest elevation: 227 m (745 ft)
- Lowest elevation: 145 m (476 ft)
- Population (2023): 461
  - Density: 158/km^{2} (410/sq mi)
- Time zone: UTC+01:00 (CET)
  - Summer (DST): UTC+02:00 (CEST)
- INSEE/Postal code: 57062 /57570
- ^{1} French Land Register data, which excludes lakes, ponds, glaciers > 1 km^{2} (0.386 sq mi or 247 acres) and river estuaries.

Berg-sur-Moselle (French pronunciation: [bɛʁɡ syʁ mɔzɛl], literally Berg on Moselle; German: Berg) is a commune in the Moselle department in Grand Est in northeastern France.

== Population ==
Historical population
Year	Pop.	±% p.a.
1968	185	—
1975	198	+0.97%
1982	224	+1.78%
1990	261	+1.93%
1999	373	+4.05%
2007	413	+1.28%
2012	435	+1.04%
2017	430	−0.23%
2023	461	+1.17%
Source: INSEE

== See also ==
- Communes of the Moselle department
