= Escherange =

- Commune
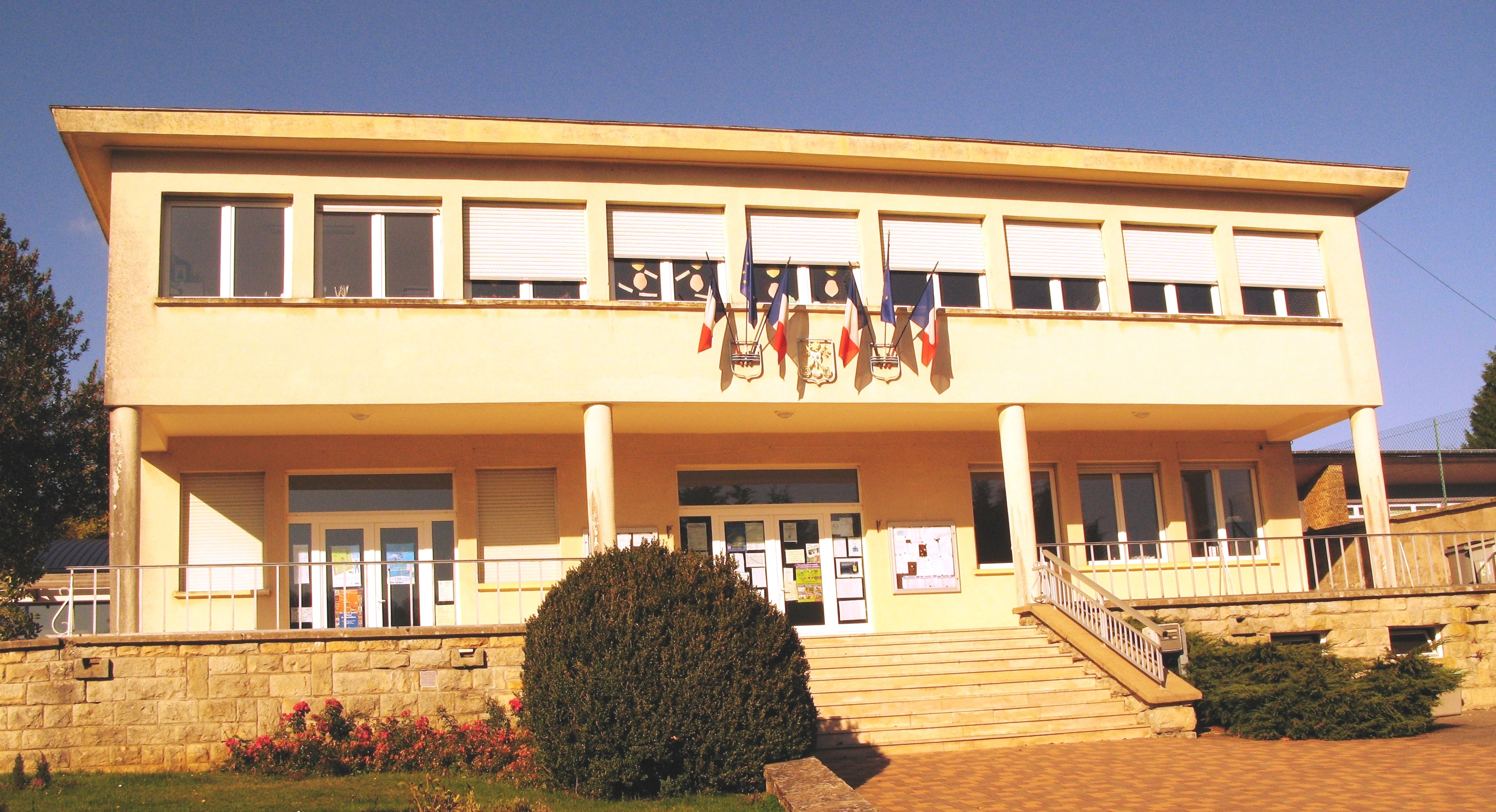
- The town hall in Escherange

- Coat of arms
- Location of Escherange
- Location within France Location within Grand Est
- Coordinates: 49°25′01″N 6°04′15″E
- Country: France
- Region: Grand Est
- Department: Moselle
- Arrondissement: Thionville
- Canton: Yutz
- Intercommunality: CC de Cattenom et Environs

Government
  - Mayor (2020–2026): Bertrand Mathieu
- Area^{1}: 13.18 km^{2} (5.09 sq mi)
- Elevation: 403 m (1,322 ft)
- Highest elevation: 428 m (1,404 ft)
- Lowest elevation: 313 m (1,027 ft)
- Population (2023): 693
  - Density: 52.6/km^{2} (136/sq mi)
- Time zone: UTC+01:00 (CET)
  - Summer (DST): UTC+02:00 (CEST)
- INSEE/Postal code: 57199 /57330
- ^{1} French Land Register data, which excludes lakes, ponds, glaciers > 1 km^{2} (0.386 sq mi or 247 acres) and river estuaries.

Escherange (French pronunciation: [ɛʃʁɑ̃ʒ]; German: Escheringen) is a commune in the Moselle department in Grand Est in north-eastern France.

Localities of the commune: Molvange (German: Molvingen).

== See also ==
- Communes of the Moselle department
