= Pierre Hemmer (entrepreneur) =

Swiss businessman (1950–2013)

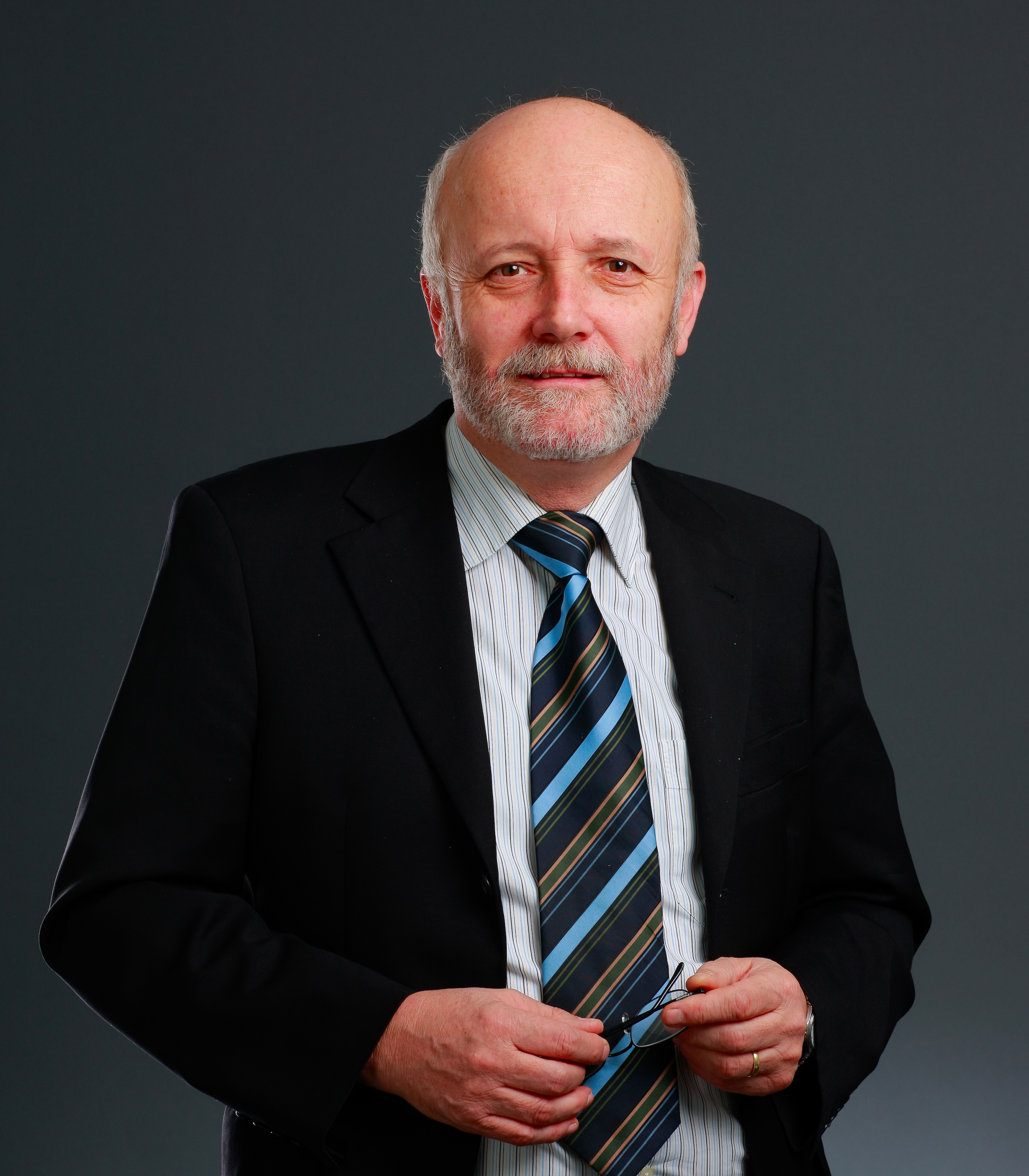
- Pierre Hemmer, Head of Development of eGovernment Services at the State Secretariat for Economic Affairs (SECO) of the Swiss Confederation (2008)
- Born: Pierre Marie François Hemmer; 8 March 1950; Fribourg, Canton of Fribourg, Switzerland
- Died: 26 June 2013 (aged 63); Mons (Var), France
- Education: College of Saint Michael (Fribourg)
- Alma mater: School of Engineering and Architecture Fribourg
- Occupations: Founder and director of MC Management et Communications SA (M&C net)
- Spouse: Rose-Marie Hemmer (-Sallin)

Pierre Hemmer (March 8, 1950 in Fribourg-June 26, 2013 was a Swiss business leader and executive of the Swiss Confederation, active in particular in the field of the Internet. In 1995, he was, with his firm M&Cnet, the only public service provider in the Canton of Fribourg and many other parts of Switzerland.

He spoke widely at conferences and in the media on the projected impact on society, health, education, economics, management, transport, and communication from the advent of new information and communications technology.

== Biography ==
Pierre Hemmer was an electronics and computer ETS engineer. In 1975, he worked for Brown, Boveri & Cie. From 1976 to 1979, he was employed by Landis+Gyr (Zug, Switzerland and California, US) then from 1979 to 1988 by Falma-Control Buser AG, as technical director and project manager.

From 1988 to 1990, going independent, he participated in the creation of the CIM Centre of Western Switzerland (CCSO). He became technical director.

On 3 January 1995 Pierre Hemmer founded MC Management et Communications SA (M&Cnet)., a company resulting from the privatization of the telecommunications and information management activities of the Swiss CIM Action Program This company provides internet access to the general public, mainly in the Canton of Fribourg and in neighboring regions.

After joining the American group Via Net.Works (today Interoute) in October 1999, in 2001, MC Management and Communications SA became Via Net.Works Switzerland SA and extended its coverage.

In 2001, Pierre Hemmer founded the firm hemmer.ch SA in Fribourg; he managed it until 2005.

Engaged in May 2006 by the Federal Chancellery as Head of Development, and then from April 2008 by the State Secretariat for Economic Affairs as Head of eGovernment Services Development, Pierre Hemmer was responsible for initiating a first harmonization of Internet-based government services to all cantons and communes of Switzerland.

== Projects and initiatives ==
In December 1991, Hemmer organized with the CIM Center of Western Switzerland a meeting of international scientific experts regarding cooperation on new production technologies, as part of an Intelligent Manufacturing Systems research program, aiming to "combine resources from Western countries to jointly develop the most advanced production techniques".

In May 1995, he launched three initiatives: to create a regional communications network in the canton of Fribourg, with new lines in the field; to create a regional platform for the exchange of marketing information and interactive advertising on the Internet; and to create a training program and didactic support.

On 27 June 1995 Hemmer and his company M&Cnet brought on-line the first cyber cafe in French-speaking Switzerland.

On 24 January 1997 he and Didier Bordon created Formation-Conseil SA, a company dedicated to training unemployed people.

In October 1997, Hemmer and his company M&Cnet connected the Services industriels bullois cable network to the Internet, offering the public on-line services via their televisions, including live radio reception on the web and Internet-based home automation applications.

In September 2000, as director of M&Cnet, Hemmer signed a partnership agreement with three other companies - the Entreprises électriques fribourgeoises (EEF), Business Computer Dimension (BCD) in Givisiez, and the Centre informatique des sociétés électriques romandes (CISEL) - aimed at offering their customers a global solution in the fields of telecommunications, Internet and business networks.

In October 2000, Hemmer handed over to the State of Fribourg the domain names fribourg.ch, sarine.ch, gruyere.ch, singine.ch, glane.ch, broye.ch and veveyse.ch (names of the canton and of six districts).

== Family ==
Pierre Hemmer's family was from Rodemack, Lorraine (France), but acquired Swiss nationality, and citizenship of Romont, in the canton of Fribourg, in 1923. He is the tenth child of François Marie Pierre Hemmer, regent in Orsonnens and Fribourg and teacher at the boys' secondary school in Fribourg, and Madeleine Marie Jambé (1910-1990), born in Châtel-St-Denis (Fribourg), housewife.

On 24 July 1976 Pierre Hemmer married Rose-Marie Hemmer, née Sallin, a secretary and housewife, with whom he had four children. She is the sister of the theater director Gisèle Sallin.
