= Canton of Yutz =

Coordinates: 49.36°N 6.19°E

The canton of Yutz is an administrative division of the Moselle department, northeastern France. Its borders were modified at the French canton reorganisation which came into effect in March 2015. Its seat is in Yutz.

It consists of the following communes:

1. Basse-Rentgen
2. Berg-sur-Moselle
3. Beyren-lès-Sierck
4. Boust
5. Breistroff-la-Grande
6. Cattenom
7. Entrange
8. Escherange
9. Évrange
10. Fixem
11. Gavisse
12. Hagen
13. Hettange-Grande
14. Illange
15. Kanfen
16. Manom
17. Mondorff
18. Puttelange-lès-Thionville
19. Rodemack
20. Roussy-le-Village
21. Thionville (partly)
22. Volmerange-les-Mines
23. Yutz
24. Zoufftgen
