= Basse-Rentgen =

- Commune
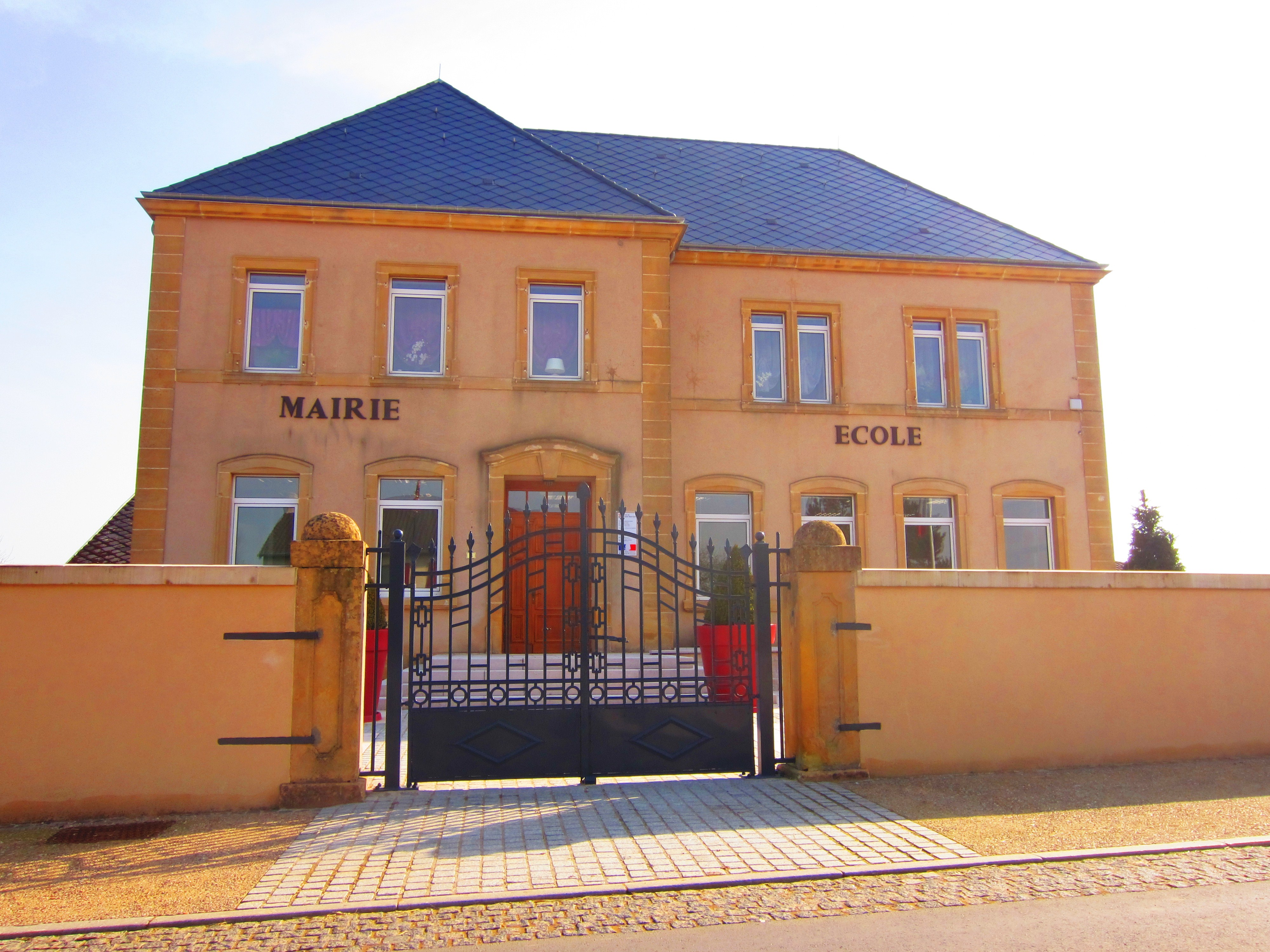
- The town hall in Basse-Rentgen

- Coat of arms
- Location of Basse-Rentgen
- Location within France Location within Grand Est
- Coordinates: 49°29′01″N 6°12′14″E
- Country: France
- Region: Grand Est
- Department: Moselle
- Arrondissement: Thionville
- Canton: Yutz
- Intercommunality: Cattenom et environs

Government
  - Mayor (2020–2026): Eric Gonand
- Area^{1}: 10.46 km^{2} (4.04 sq mi)
- Elevation: 200 m (660 ft)
- Highest elevation: 267 m (876 ft)
- Lowest elevation: 209 m (686 ft)
- Population (2023): 524
  - Density: 50.1/km^{2} (130/sq mi)
- Time zone: UTC+01:00 (CET)
  - Summer (DST): UTC+02:00 (CEST)
- INSEE/Postal code: 57574 /57570
- ^{1} French Land Register data, which excludes lakes, ponds, glaciers > 1 km^{2} (0.386 sq mi or 247 acres) and river estuaries.

Basse-Rentgen (German: Nieder-Rentgen) is a commune in the Moselle department in Grand Est in northeastern France.

== Population ==
Historical population
Year	Pop.	±% p.a.
1968	254	—
1975	230	−1.41%
1982	213	−1.09%
1990	289	+3.89%
1999	306	+0.64%
2007	329	+0.91%
2012	401	+4.04%
2017	491	+4.13%
2023	524	+1.09%
Source: INSEE

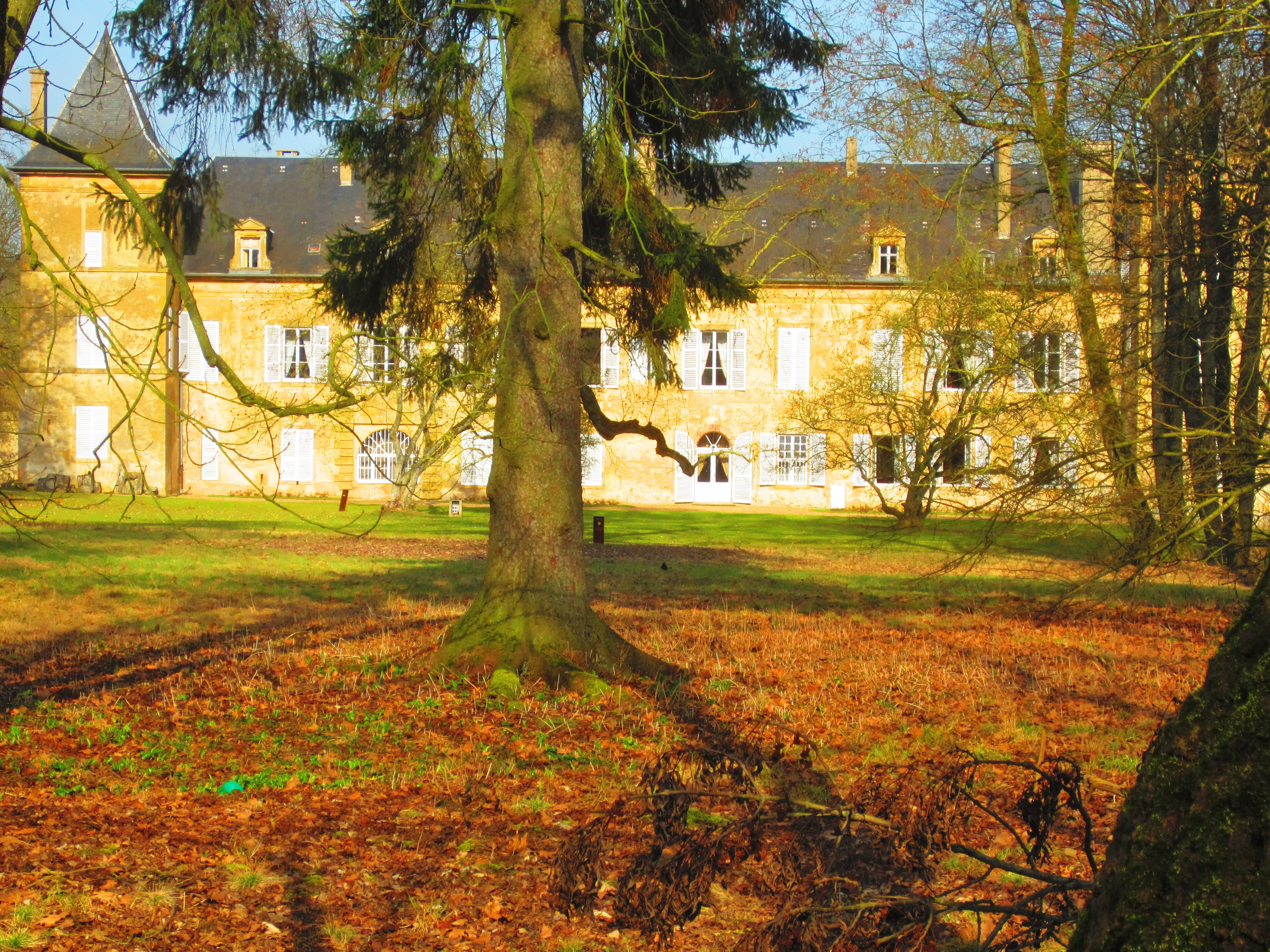
Preich Castle

== See also ==
- Communes of the Moselle department
