= Felipe III =

Felipe III is the name of two Spanish kings who also ruled over Portugal:

- Philip III of Spain (II of Portugal)
- Philip III of Portugal (IV of Spain)

== See also ==
- Philip III (disambiguation)
