= Kanfen =

- Commune
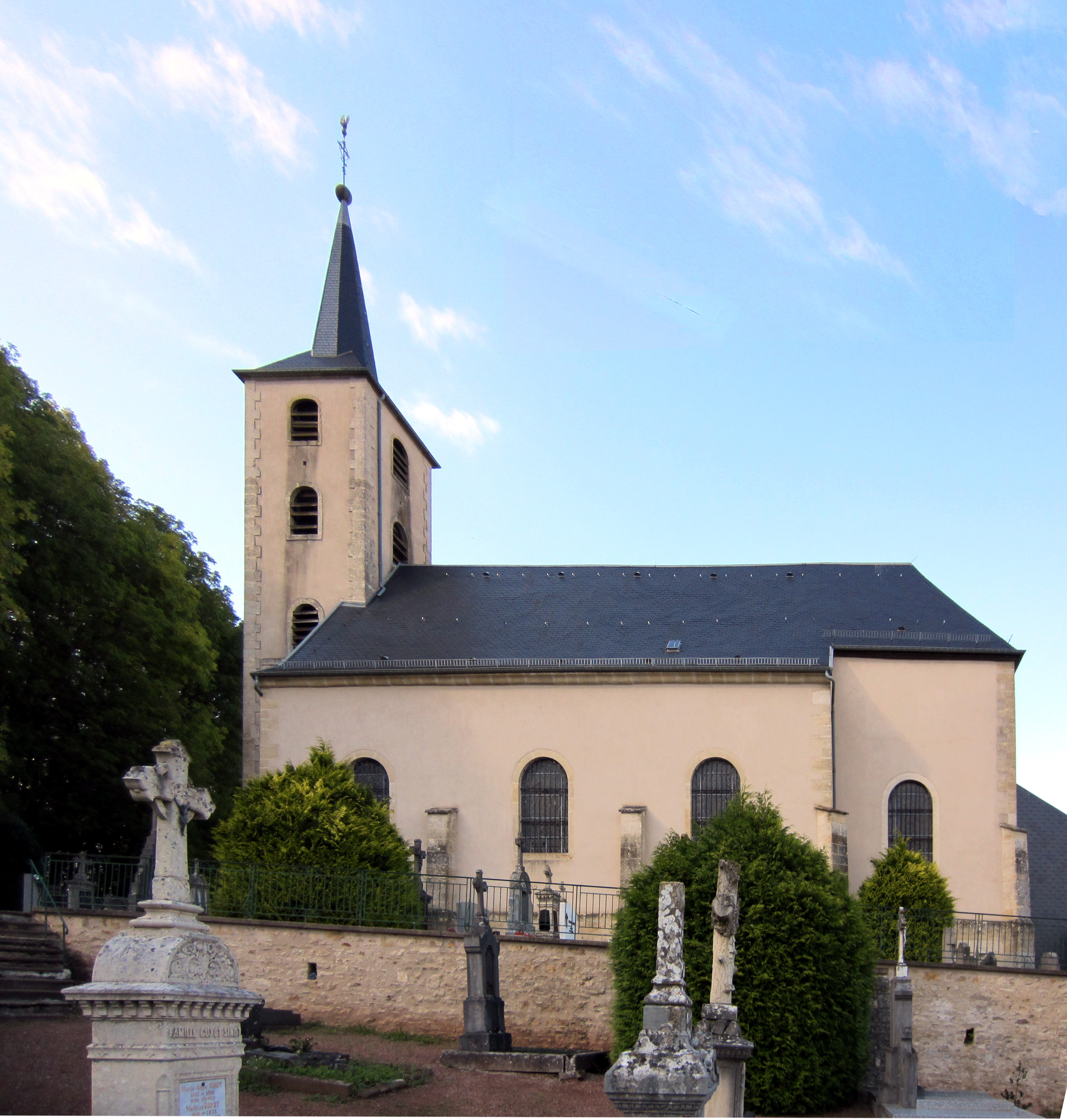
- The church in Kanfen

- Coat of arms
- Location of Kanfen
- Location within France Location within Grand Est
- Coordinates: 49°26′24″N 6°06′37″E
- Country: France
- Region: Grand Est
- Department: Moselle
- Arrondissement: Thionville
- Canton: Yutz
- Intercommunality: Cattenom et Environs

Government
  - Mayor (2020–2026): Denis Baur
- Area^{1}: 8.5 km^{2} (3.3 sq mi)
- Highest elevation: 400 m (1,300 ft)
- Lowest elevation: 198 m (650 ft)
- Population (2023): 1,235
  - Density: 150/km^{2} (380/sq mi)
- Time zone: UTC+01:00 (CET)
  - Summer (DST): UTC+02:00 (CEST)
- INSEE/Postal code: 57356 /57330
- ^{1} French Land Register data, which excludes lakes, ponds, glaciers > 1 km^{2} (0.386 sq mi or 247 acres) and river estuaries.

Kanfen (French pronunciation: [kanfən]; German: Kanfen) is a commune in the Moselle department in Grand Est in north-eastern France.

== Population ==
Historical population
Year	Pop.	±% p.a.
1968	483	—
1975	469	−0.42%
1982	615	+3.95%
1990	722	+2.03%
1999	776	+0.80%
2007	982	+2.99%
2012	1,087	+2.05%
2017	1,174	+1.55%
2023	1,235	+0.85%
Source: INSEE

== See also ==
- Communes of the Moselle department
