= Gavisse =

- Commune
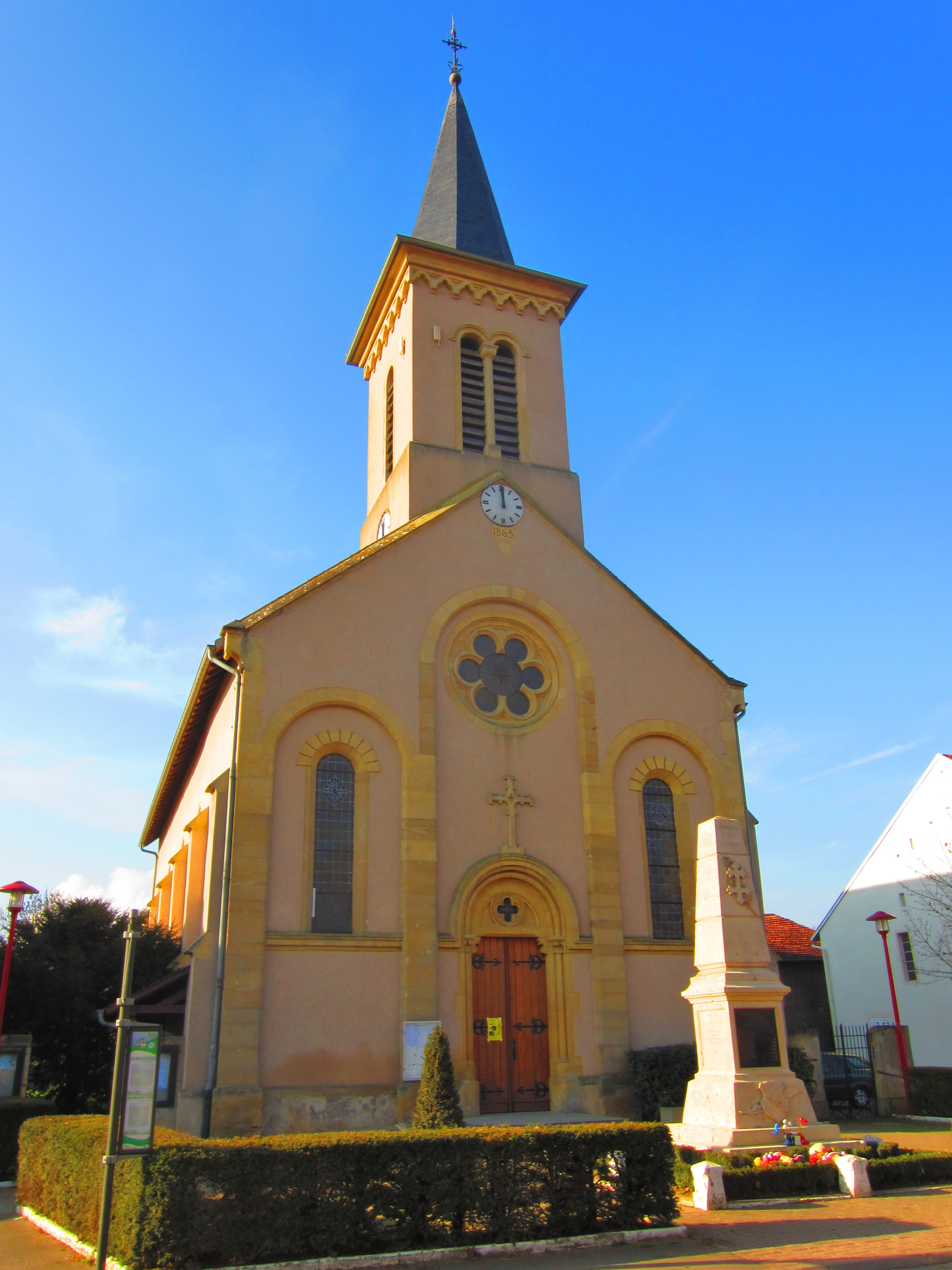
- The church in Gavisse

- Coat of arms
- Location of Gavisse
- Location within France Location within Grand Est
- Coordinates: 49°25′58″N 6°17′16″E
- Country: France
- Region: Grand Est
- Department: Moselle
- Arrondissement: Thionville
- Canton: Yutz
- Intercommunality: CC de Cattenom et Environs

Government
  - Mayor (2020–2026): Alain Redinge
- Area^{1}: 4.15 km^{2} (1.60 sq mi)
- Elevation: 130 m (430 ft)
- Highest elevation: 180 m (590 ft)
- Lowest elevation: 148 m (486 ft)
- Population (2023): 602
  - Density: 145/km^{2} (376/sq mi)
- Time zone: UTC+01:00 (CET)
  - Summer (DST): UTC+02:00 (CEST)
- INSEE/Postal code: 57245 /57570
- ^{1} French Land Register data, which excludes lakes, ponds, glaciers > 1 km^{2} (0.386 sq mi or 247 acres) and river estuaries.

Gavisse (French pronunciation: [ɡavis]; German: Gauwies; Lorraine Franconian: Gawiss) is a commune in the Moselle department in Grand Est in north-eastern France.

== See also ==
- Communes of the Moselle department
