= Puttelange-lès-Thionville =

- Commune
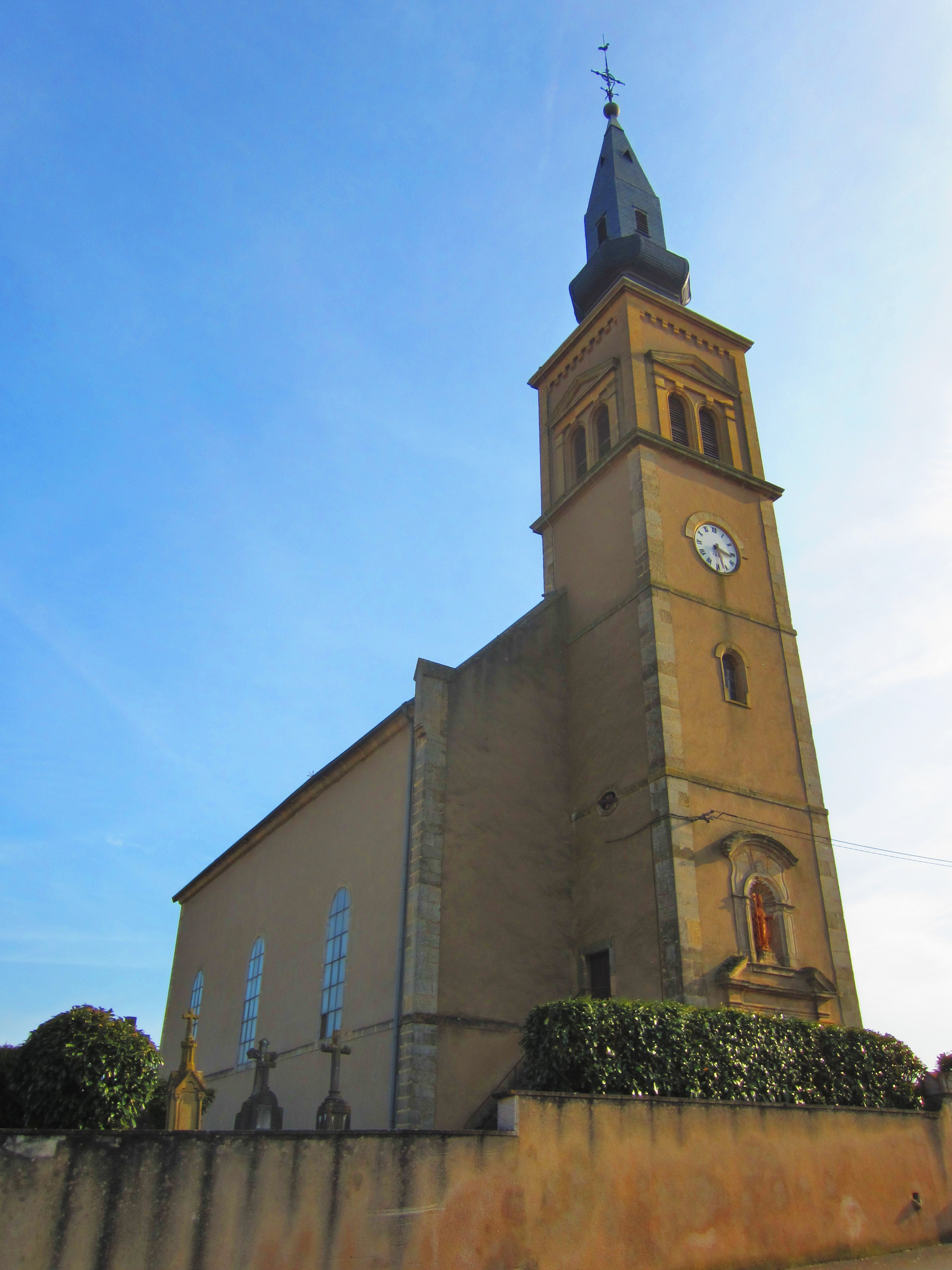
- The church in Puttelange-lès-Thionville

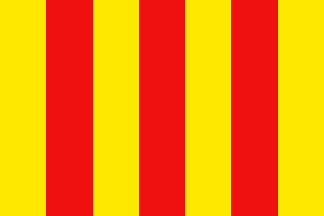
- Flag Coat of arms
- Location of Puttelange-lès-Thionville
- Location within France Location within Grand Est
- Coordinates: 49°29′08″N 6°16′04″E
- Country: France
- Region: Grand Est
- Department: Moselle
- Arrondissement: Thionville
- Canton: Yutz
- Intercommunality: CC de Cattenom et Environs

Government
  - Mayor (2020–2026): Joseph Ghamo
- Area^{1}: 10.67 km^{2} (4.12 sq mi)
- Elevation: 120 m (390 ft)
- Highest elevation: 258 m (846 ft)
- Lowest elevation: 165 m (541 ft)
- Population (2023): 1,029
  - Density: 96.44/km^{2} (249.8/sq mi)
- Time zone: UTC+01:00 (CET)
  - Summer (DST): UTC+02:00 (CEST)
- INSEE/Postal code: 57557 /57570
- ^{1} French Land Register data, which excludes lakes, ponds, glaciers > 1 km^{2} (0.386 sq mi or 247 acres) and river estuaries.

Puttelange-lès-Thionville (French pronunciation: [pytlɑ̃ʒ lɛ tjɔ̃vil], literally Puttelange near Thionville) is a commune in the Moselle department in Grand Est in north-eastern France.

== See also ==
- Communes of the Moselle department
