= Fixem =

- Commune
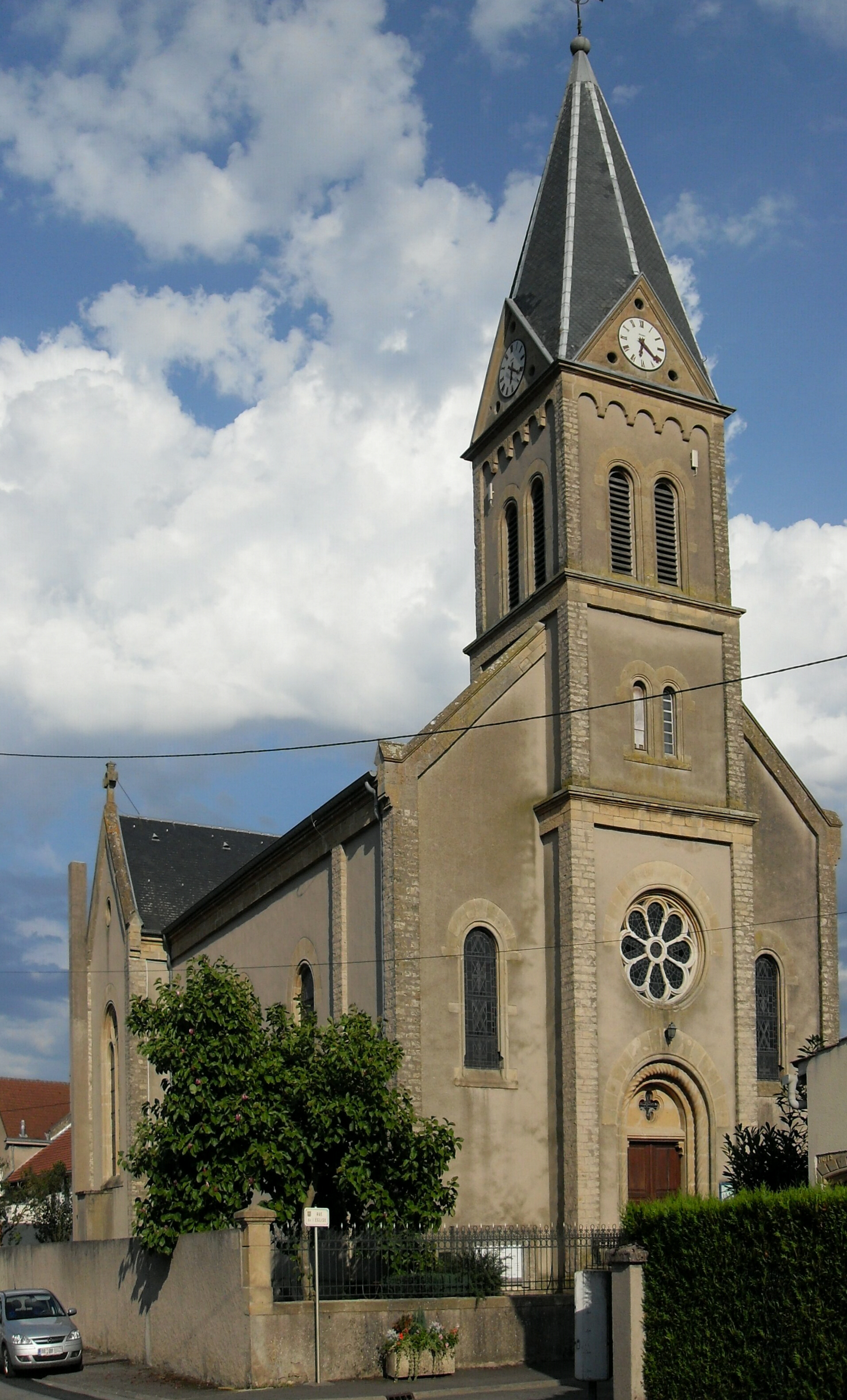
- L'église Saint-Sébastien

- Coat of arms
- Location of Fixem
- Location within France Location within Grand Est
- Coordinates: 49°26′37″N 6°16′32″E
- Country: France
- Region: Grand Est
- Department: Moselle
- Arrondissement: Thionville
- Canton: Yutz
- Intercommunality: CC de Cattenom et Environs

Government
  - Mayor (2020–2026): Marie-Marthe Dutta Gupta
- Area^{1}: 3.53 km^{2} (1.36 sq mi)
- Elevation: 172 m (564 ft)
- Highest elevation: 215 m (705 ft)
- Lowest elevation: 150 m (490 ft)
- Population (2023): 397
  - Density: 112/km^{2} (291/sq mi)
- Time zone: UTC+01:00 (CET)
  - Summer (DST): UTC+02:00 (CEST)
- INSEE/Postal code: 57214 /57570
- ^{1} French Land Register data, which excludes lakes, ponds, glaciers > 1 km^{2} (0.386 sq mi or 247 acres) and river estuaries.

Fixem (French pronunciation: [fiksɛm]; German: Fixheim) is a commune in the Moselle department in Grand Est in north-eastern France.

Was named Fuckinsheim in the year 781

== See also ==
- Communes of the Moselle department
