= Boust =

- Commune
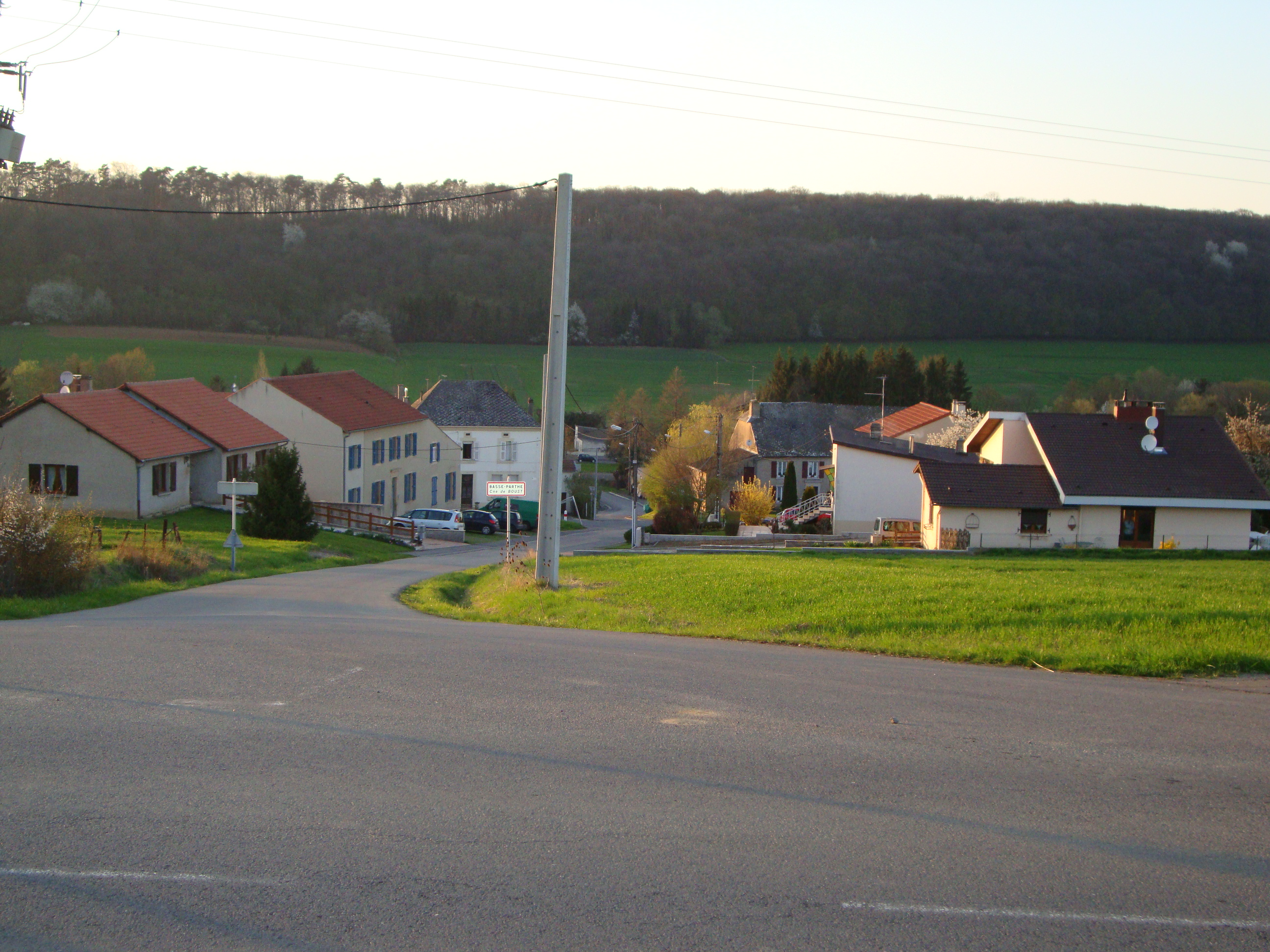
- Basse Parthe

- Coat of arms
- Location of Boust
- Location within France Location within Grand Est
- Coordinates: 49°26′05″N 6°11′25″E
- Country: France
- Region: Grand Est
- Department: Moselle
- Arrondissement: Thionville
- Canton: Yutz
- Intercommunality: Cattenom et environs

Government
  - Mayor (2020–2026): Guy Kremer
- Area^{1}: 7.01 km^{2} (2.71 sq mi)
- Elevation: 230 m (750 ft)
- Highest elevation: 259 m (850 ft)
- Lowest elevation: 166 m (545 ft)
- Population (2023): 1,157
  - Density: 165/km^{2} (427/sq mi)
- Time zone: UTC+01:00 (CET)
  - Summer (DST): UTC+02:00 (CEST)
- INSEE/Postal code: 57104 /57570
- ^{1} French Land Register data, which excludes lakes, ponds, glaciers > 1 km^{2} (0.386 sq mi or 247 acres) and river estuaries.

Boust (French pronunciation: [bust]; German: Bust) is a commune in the Moselle department in Grand Est in northeastern France.

The localities of Basse Parthe (German: Niederparth), Haute Parthe (German: Oberparth) and Usselskirch (German: Usselskirch) are incorporated in the commune.

== Population ==
Historical population
Year	Pop.	±% p.a.
1968	482	—
1975	530	+1.37%
1982	685	+3.73%
1990	738	+0.94%
1999	717	−0.32%
2007	988	+4.09%
2012	1,147	+3.03%
2017	1,228	+1.37%
2023	1,157	−0.99%
Source: INSEE

== See also ==
- Communes of the Moselle department
