= Cecilia Månsdotter =

Swedish noblewoman

Cecilia Månsdotter Eka
- Born: c. 1475; Eka, now in Örebro County
- Died: 1523; Stockholm
- Noble family: Eka
- Spouse: Erik Johansson Vasa
- Father: Magnus Karlsson Eka
- Mother: Sigrid Eskilsdotter Banér

Cecilia Månsdotter Eka (c. 1476–1523) also called Cecilia of Eka, was a Swedish noblewoman. She was the spouse of Erik Johansson Vasa and mother of King Gustav I of Sweden.

== Biography ==
Cecilia was born around 1476 in Eka, Lillkyrka, which is now known as Eka, Örebro County in Sweden. She was the oldest of the two children from the nobles Sigrid Eskilsdotter Banér and Magnus Karlsson Eka. Her mother later remarried, and became the mother of the famous Christina Gyllenstierna in her second marriage, who was thereby Cecilia's half sister. Cecilia Månsdotter married the noble Erik Johansson Vasa before 1495 and with him had eight children.

In 1520, Cecilia's half sister Christina defended Stockholm from the Danish invasion, but was forced to surrender. Cecilia became a widow when her husband was executed at the Stockholm Bloodbath in 1520. She, as well as her half sister Christina Gyllenstierna, her mother and her daughters, belonged to the Swedish noblewomen taken as prisoners by the Danes. They were taken to Denmark in 1521 and imprisoned in the infamous Blaatornet (Blue Tower) in Copenhagen Castle - where she died of the plague in 1523, along with her two younger daughters Martha and Emerentia.

Cecilia was promised her freedom by King Christian, if she convinced her son Gustav to submit to him. She agreed and did enter in negotiations with her son and wrote to him, but failed to convince him. Cecilia died the same year her son Gustav became king of the newly independent Sweden, which he had liberated from Denmark.

According to legend, she was in fact executed by the King of Denmark. As an act of revenge after her son proclaimed himself King of Sweden, the King of Denmark forced her to sew a sack. After she was finished, he allegedly had her placed in the sack and have it thrown in the sea, where she drowned. There is no confirmation that this legend is true, however, though the women were said to have been badly treated in the prison by the cold air, harsh treatment and starvation. The way of execution was the same method by which her mother was nearly executed during the Stockholm Bloodbath. In reality, it is believed that she died of the plague along with her two youngest daughters.

Her mother, her half sister Christina, and her eldest daughter Margareta were eventually released and returned to Sweden.

== Family ==
Cecilia Månsdotter married Erik Johansson Vasa and with him had eight children. Their children were:

1. Gustav Eriksson Vasa (12 May 1495 – 29 September 1560) who became King of Sweden in 1523
2. Margareta Eriksdotter Vasa (1497 – 31 December 1536)
3. Johan Eriksson (b. 1499, d. young)
4. Magnus Eriksson (1501–1529)
5. Anna Eriksdotter (1503–1545), nun at Vadstena Abbey
6. Birgitta Eriksdotter (b. 1505, d. young)
7. Marta Eriksdotter (1507–1523)
8. Emerentia Eriksdotter (1507–1523)

Their children were born in either Orkesta or Rydboholm Castle or Lindholmen, Vallentuna all in today's county of Stockholm (Swedish: Stockholms Län), in southeastern Sweden.
