= Roussy-le-Village =

- Commune
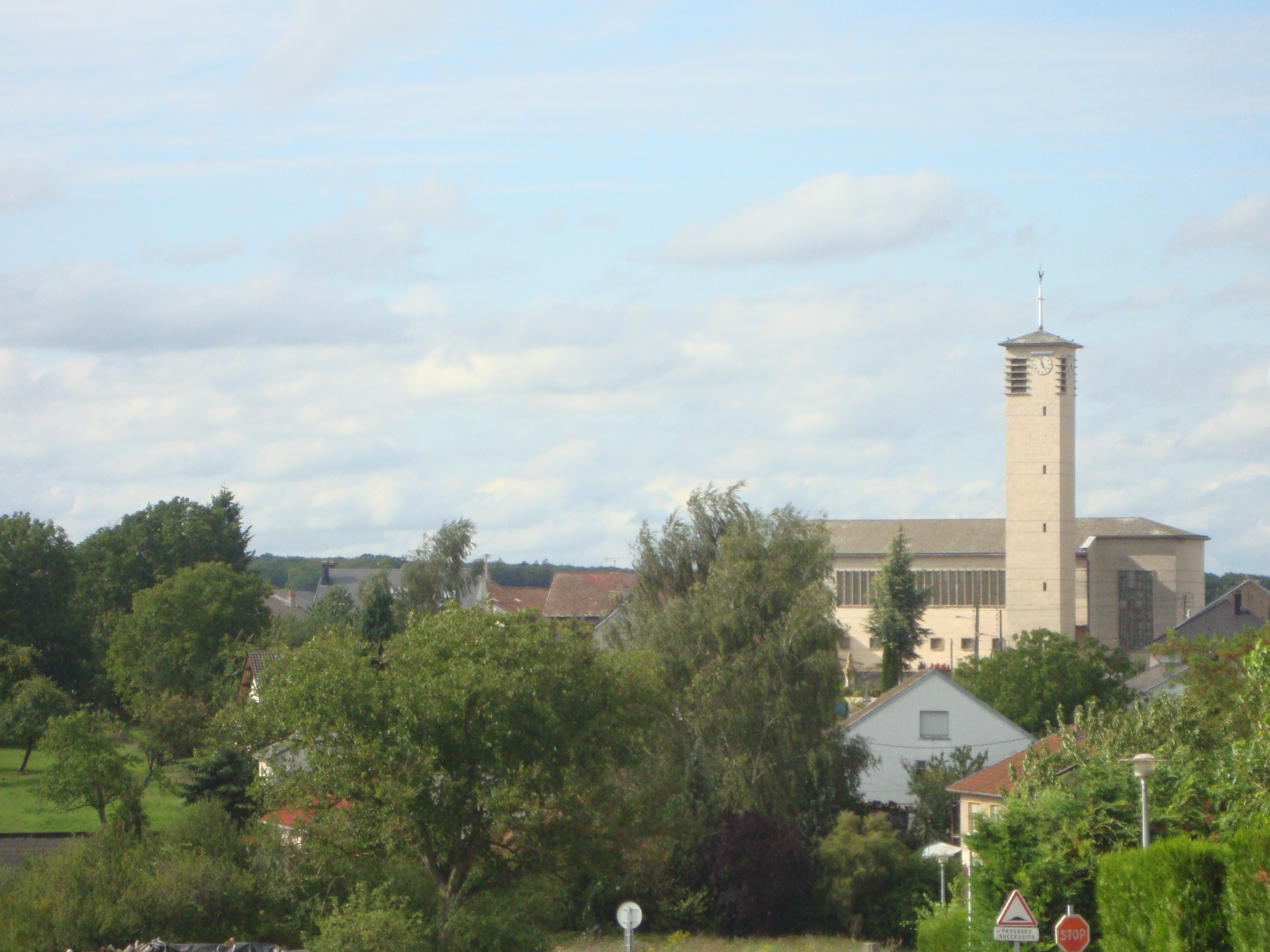
- A view of the village and church

- Coat of arms
- Location of Roussy-le-Village
- Location within France Location within Grand Est
- Coordinates: 49°27′27″N 6°10′28″E
- Country: France
- Region: Grand Est
- Department: Moselle
- Arrondissement: Thionville
- Canton: Yutz
- Intercommunality: CC de Cattenom et Environs

Government
  - Mayor (2023–2026): Joël Immer
- Area^{1}: 12.5 km^{2} (4.8 sq mi)
- Elevation: 200 m (660 ft)
- Highest elevation: 259 m (850 ft)
- Lowest elevation: 190 m (620 ft)
- Population (2023): 1,592
  - Density: 127/km^{2} (330/sq mi)
- Time zone: UTC+01:00 (CET)
  - Summer (DST): UTC+02:00 (CEST)
- INSEE/Postal code: 57600 /57330
- ^{1} French Land Register data, which excludes lakes, ponds, glaciers > 1 km^{2} (0.386 sq mi or 247 acres) and river estuaries.

Roussy-le-Village (French pronunciation: [ʁusi lə vilaʒ]; German: Rüttgen) is a commune in the Moselle department in Grand Est in north-eastern France.

== See also ==
- Communes of the Moselle department
