= Erik Johansson Vasa =

Father of King Gustav I of Sweden

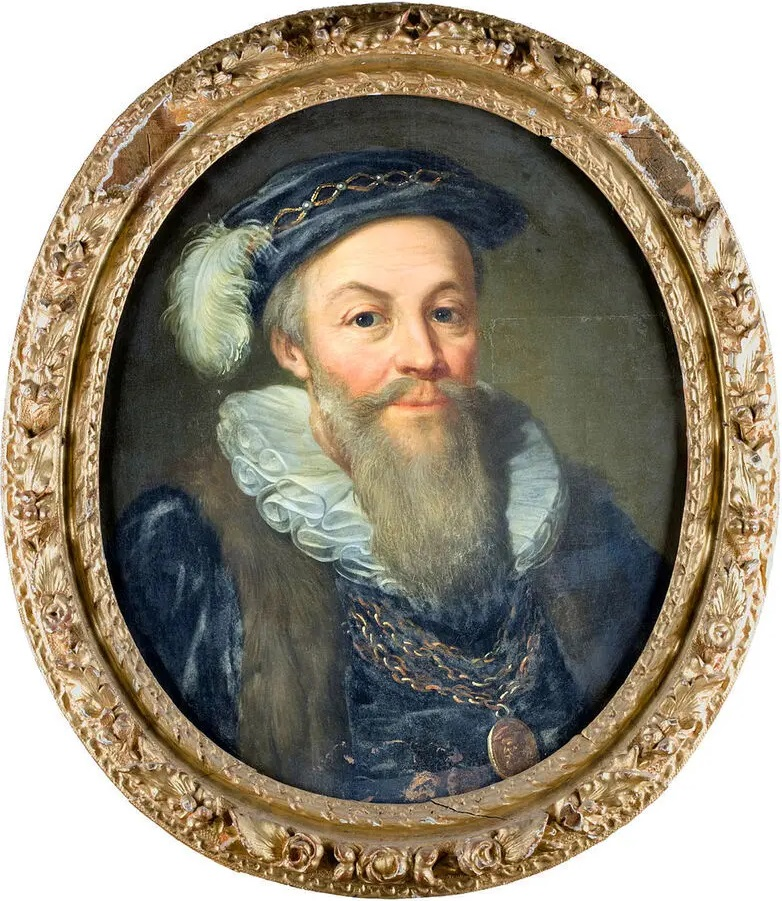
- Erik Johansson Vasa as portrayed by Lorens Pasch the Younger in 1782 (likeness is questionable)
- Born: c. 1470; Örbyhus
- Died: 8 November 1520; Stockholm
- Noble family: Vasa
- Spouse: Cecilia Månsdotter Eka
- Father: Johan Kristiernsson Vasa
- Mother: Birgitta Gustafsdotter Sture

Erik Johansson Vasa (c. 1470 – 8 November 1520) was a Swedish noble and the Lord of Rydboholm Castle in Roslagen. His son would rule as King Gustav Vasa from 1523–1560.

== Biography ==
He was born around the year 1470 to Johan Kristiernsson Vasa and Birgitta Gustafsdotter Sture at Örbyhus Castle in the province of Uppland, Sweden. He was one of four children from Johan and Birgitta. His father Johan was a first cousin of Knut Tordsson (Bonde), father of King Charles VIII of Sweden. His mother Birgitta was a sister of Sten Sture the Elder.

Erik Johansson Vasa was a faithful adherent of the Stures, a powerful and influential family in Sweden from the late 15th century to the early 16th century, and was notorious for his irritable and arbitrary temper. He assisted the Stures in fighting against the Danes, who controlled most of Sweden during the early 16th century. When the Danes, led by King Christian II of Denmark, conquered Sweden and seized the capital city Stockholm in 1520, several members of the Sture party were executed in the Stockholm Bloodbath in November of that year. Among those executed was Erik Johansson Vasa on 8 November 1520.

His first son, Gustav Eriksson Vasa, had escaped from Denmark some time before this event, and survived. He became King Gustav I of Sweden from 1523 until his death in 1560 and founder of the House of Vasa. His reign marked the final secession of Sweden from the Danish dominated Kalmar Union which had dated from 1397.

== Personal life ==
He married Cecilia Månsdotter Eka (c. 1476–1523) and had eight children with her. All of their children were born in either Orkesta or Rydboholm Castle in the present-day county of Stockholm.

Their children were:

- Gustav Eriksson Vasa (12 May 1496 – 29 September 1560) would become King Gustav I of Sweden in 1523.
- Margareta Eriksdotter Vasa (1497 – 31 December 1536)
- Johan Eriksson (b. 1499, died young)
- Magnus Eriksson (1501–1529)
- Anna Eriksdotter (1503–1545), nun at Vadstena Abbey
- Birgitta Eriksdotter (b. 1505, died young)
- Märta Eriksdotter (1507–1523)
- Emerentia Eriksdotter (1507–1523)

== See also ==
- Foundation of modern Sweden
- Kalmar Union
- Line of succession to the Swedish Throne
