= Rodemack =

- Commune
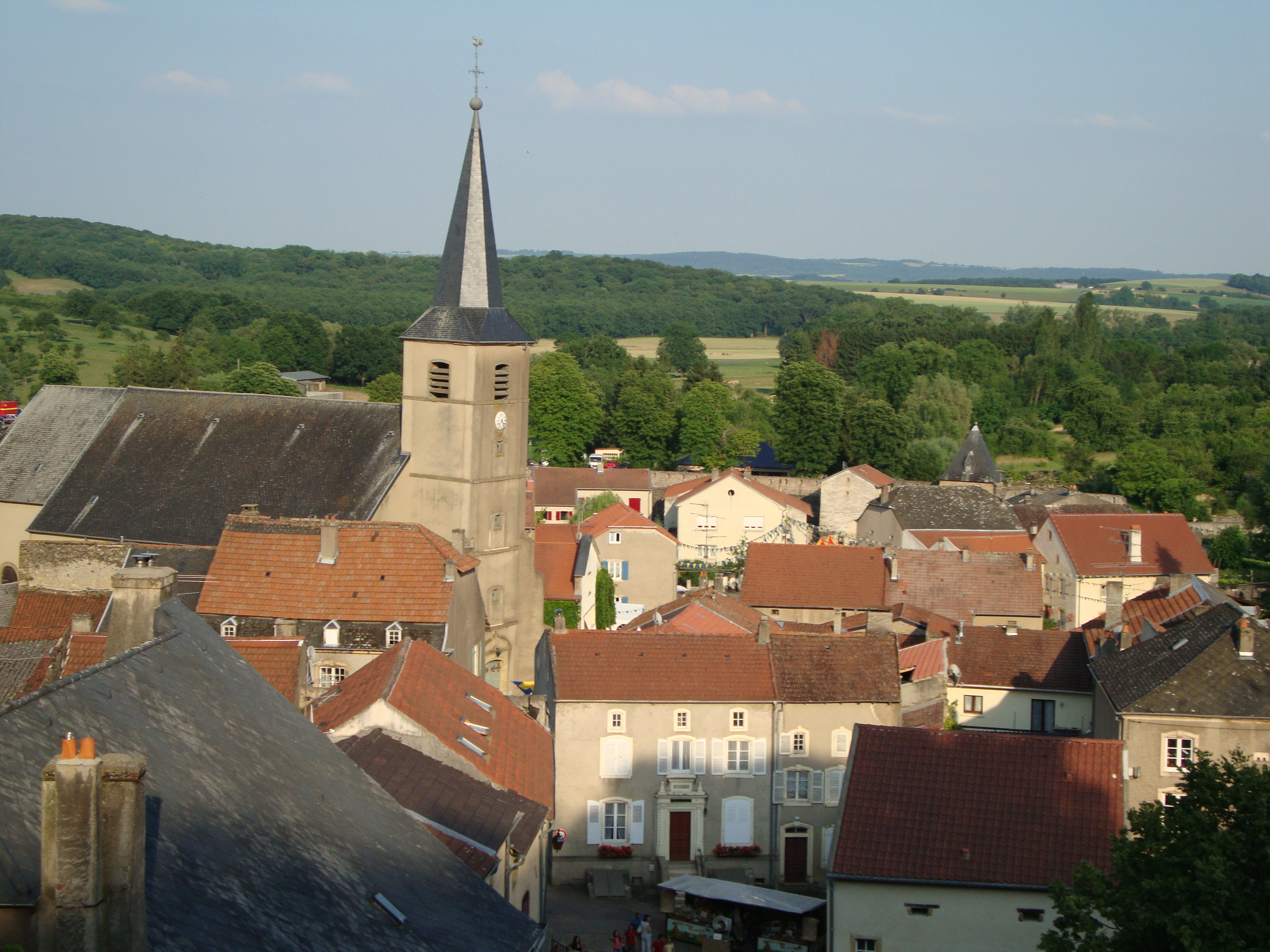
- The church and surroundings in Rodemack

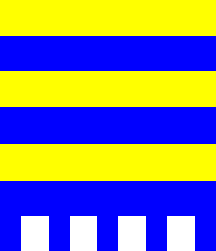
- Flag Coat of arms
- Location of Rodemack
- Location within France Location within Grand Est
- Coordinates: 49°28′11″N 6°14′13″E
- Country: France
- Region: Grand Est
- Department: Moselle
- Arrondissement: Thionville
- Canton: Yutz
- Intercommunality: CC de Cattenom et Environs

Government
  - Mayor (2020–2026): Olivier Kormann
- Area^{1}: 9.96 km^{2} (3.85 sq mi)
- Elevation: 180 m (590 ft)
- Highest elevation: 242 m (794 ft)
- Lowest elevation: 154 m (505 ft)
- Population (2023): 1,277
  - Density: 128/km^{2} (332/sq mi)
- Time zone: UTC+01:00 (CET)
  - Summer (DST): UTC+02:00 (CEST)
- INSEE/Postal code: 57588 /57570
- ^{1} French Land Register data, which excludes lakes, ponds, glaciers > 1 km^{2} (0.386 sq mi or 247 acres) and river estuaries.

Rodemack (French pronunciation: [ʁɔdmak]; German: Rodemachern [ˈʁoːdəmaxɐn]; Lorraine Franconian/Luxembourgish: Roudemaacher [ˈʀəʊ̯dəmaːχɐ], Ruedemaacher) is a commune in the Moselle department in Grand Est in northeastern France. It is a member of Les Plus Beaux Villages de France (The Most Beautiful Villages of France) Association.

Localities of the commune: Esing, Faulbach, Semming.

== Personalities related to the municipality ==
- Jean-Marie Pelt (1933-2015), French botanist-ecologist, founder of the European Institute of Ecology (Metz).
- The barons of Rodemack, lineage of the nobility of the Holy Roman Empire, which has its roots in Rodemack.
- Pierre Hemmer (1950-2013), one of the Internet pioneers in Switzerland.
- Princess Cecilia of Sweden

== See also ==
- Communes of the Moselle department
