= List of monarchs of Baden =

Monarchy of Baden
- State
- Grand Ducal coat of arms

- Last to reign: Frederick II; 28 September 1907 – 22 November 1918

Details
- Style: His Royal Highness (for Grand Dukes)
- First monarch: Berthold I (as Count)
- Last monarch: Frederick II (as Grand Duke)
- Formed: 962
- Abolished: 22 November 1918
- Appointer: Hereditary
- Pretender: Bernhard (as Margrave)

The following is a list of monarchs during the history of Baden.

Baden was an Imperial Estate of the Holy Roman Empire and later one of the German states along the frontier with France, primarily consisting of territory along the right bank of the Rhine, opposite Alsace and the Palatinate.

== History ==
The territory evolved out of the Breisgau, an early medieval county in the Duchy of Swabia. A continuous sequence of counts is known since 962; the counts belong to the House of Zähringen. In 1061, the counts first acquired the additional title of Margrave of Verona. Even though they lost the March of Verona soon thereafter, they kept the title of margrave. In 1112, the title of Margrave of Baden was first used.

For most of the early modern period, the Margraviate of Baden was divided into two parts, one ruled by the Catholic Margraves of Baden-Baden, and the other by the Protestant Margraves of Baden-Durlach. In 1771, the main Baden-Baden line became extinct, and all of the Baden lands came under the rule of the Baden-Durlach line. The reunited margraviate existed until 1803.

During the Napoleonic era, in the imperial reorganisation of 1803, Baden gained a great deal of additional territory, and its ruler was promoted to become one of the few prince-electors of the Holy Roman Empire. However, this situation lasted only for three years until the crushing Battle of Austerlitz at the hands of Napoleon's armies, which caused the Holy Roman Empire to be declared dissolved eight months later, in August 1806.

By definition the Electorate of Baden then ceased to exist as such. Just as the former Holy Roman Emperor now assumed the title of Emperor of Austria, so the ruler of Baden assumed that of Grand Duke of Baden. The Grand Duchy of Baden, with increased additional territory, continued in existence approximately within its 1806 borders until the fall of the German monarchies in 1918, when it became the Republic of Baden.

== Counts in Breisgau ==
- Berthold I, before 962–982
- Berthold II, 982–1005/06
- Berthold III, 1005/06–1024
- Berthold IV, 1024–1073
- Herman I of Baden, 1040–1074

== The Margraviate of Baden ==
During the 11th century, the Duchy of Swabia lacked a powerful central authority and was under the control of various comital dynasties, the strongest of them being the House of Hohenstaufen, the House of Welf, the Habsburgs and the House of Zähringen. Emperor Henry III had promised the ducal throne to the Zähringen scion Berthold, however, upon Henry's death in 1056, his widow Agnes of Poitou appointed Rudolf of Rheinfelden as Duke of Swabia. Berthold renounced his rights and was compensated with the Duchy of Carinthia and the March of Verona in Italy. Not able to establish himself, he finally lost both territories, when he was deposed by King Henry IV of Germany during the Investiture Controversy in 1077. Berthold retired to his Swabian home territory, where he died the next year. The Veronese margravial title was nevertheless retained by his eldest son, Herman I.

Herman II, son of Herman I and grandson of Berthold, had concluded an agreement with the rival Hohenstaufen dynasty, and about 1098 was enfeoffed with immediate territory by Emperor Henry IV. He chose to establish his residence in Germany, as he had been born and raised there. His lordship of choice was Baden (present-day Baden-Baden), where his father had gained the right to rule by marrying the heiress, Judit von Backnang-Sulichgau, Countess of Eberstein-Calw. In Baden, Herman II had Hohenbaden Castle built. Construction began about 1100, and when it was completed in 1112, he marked the occasion by adopting the title of Margrave of Baden.

=== House of Zähringen ===
==== Partitions of Baden under Zähringen rule ====
Margraviate of Baden (1161–1515) (Pforzheim line from 1348)	Margraviate of Hachberg (1190–1415)	Margraviate of Sausenberg (1290–1503)
Margraviate of Pforzheim (1291–1348)	Margraviate of Eberstein (1288–1353)
(In 1515 new divisions were made)
Margraviate of Baden (Rodemachern line from 1588) (1515–1771)	Margraviate of Rodemachern (1536–1666)	Margraviate of Hachberg (1577–1591)	Margraviate of Durlach (1515–1771)
Margraviate of Baden (Durlach line) (1771–1803)

==== Table of monarchs ====
(Note: Between 1190 and 1515 there were three main numberings of monarchs in Baden: the Baden numbering, valid for all divisions of Baden with exception of Hachberg; the Hachberg numbering, valid in the namesake territory; and the Hachberg-Sausenberg, division of the previous, which also adopted an independent numbering for its monarchs. With the reunion of Baden in 1503, Baden original numbering ended up prevailing over the others.)

Monarch		Born	Reign	Ruling part	Consort	Death	Notes
Herman II		c.1060 Son of Herman I and Judith of Backnang-Sulichgau	1074 – 7 October 1130	Margraviate of Baden	Judith of Hohenberg c.1105 two children	7 October 1130 aged 69–70	He was the first to use the title of "Margrave of Baden" (in 1112). Also Margrave of Verona.
Herman III the Great		c.1105 Son of Herman II and Judith of Hohenberg	7 October 1130 – 16 January 1160	Margraviate of Baden	Bertha of Lorraine; 1134 two children Maria of Bohemia; After 1141 no children	16 January 1160 aged 54–55	In 1151, the margraviate of Verona was taken from Ottokar III of Styria and conferred on Herman III. Took part in the Second Crusade.
Herman IV		c.1135 Son of Herman III and Bertha of Lorraine	16 January 1160 – 13 September 1190	Margraviate of Baden	Bertha of Tübingen; 1162 seven children	13 September 1190	Took part in various battles at the side of the German Emperor, and also joined on the Third Crusade.
Regency of Bertha of Tübingen (1190–1194)							Children of Herman IV, divided the inheritance.
Herman V		c.1180 First son of Herman IV and Bertha of Tübingen	13 September 1190 – 16 January 1243	Margraviate of Baden	Irmengard of the Palatinate; 1217 four children	16 January 1243 aged 62–63	Children of Herman IV, divided the inheritance.
Henry I		c.1180 Second son of Herman IV and Bertha of Tübingen	13 September 1190 – 2 July 1231	Margraviate of Hachberg	Agnes of Urach c.1220? three children	2 July 1231 aged 50–51	Children of Herman IV, divided the inheritance.
Regency of Agnes of Urach (1231–c.1234?)							Abdicated in 1289, and joined the Teutonic Knights.
Henry II		c.1220? Son of Henry I and Agnes of Urach	2 July 1231 – 1289	Margraviate of Hachberg	Anna of Üsingen-Ketzingen c.1240? eight children	1297 or 1298 aged 77–78?	Abdicated in 1289, and joined the Teutonic Knights.
Herman VI		c.1226 First son of Herman V and Irmengard of the Palatinate	16 January 1243 – 4 October 1250	Margraviate of Baden	Gertrude of Austria; 1248 two children	4 October 1250 aged 23–24	Children of Herman V, divided their inheritance. Through Matilda's inheritance, Stuttgart was inherited by the House of Württemberg. Herman fought in the Austrian War of Succession in 1246, claiming the title "Duke of Austria" from 1248.
Matilda		c.1225 Daughter of Herman V and Irmengard of the Palatinate	16 January 1243 – c.1260	Margraviate of Baden (at Stuttgart)	Ulrich I, Count of Württemberg; 1251 three children	c.1260 aged 34–35	Children of Herman V, divided their inheritance. Through Matilda's inheritance, Stuttgart was inherited by the House of Württemberg. Herman fought in the Austrian War of Succession in 1246, claiming the title "Duke of Austria" from 1248.
Regency of Rudolph of Baden (1250–1267)							Frederick accompanied King Conradin in his battles and was beheaded with him in 1268.
Frederick I		1249; Alland; Son of Herman VI and Gertrude of Austria	4 October 1250 – 29 October 1268	Margraviate of Baden	Unmarried	29 October 1268; Naples aged 18–19	Frederick accompanied King Conradin in his battles and was beheaded with him in 1268.
Rudolph I		c.1230 Second son of Herman V and Irmengard of the Palatinate	29 October 1268 – 19 November 1288	Margraviate of Baden	Kunigunde of Eberstein (1230 – 12 April 1284/1290); 20 May 1257 eight children	19 November 1288 aged 57–58	Held regency for his nephew Frederick, and then ended up succeeding him, after his childless death.
Herman VII the Rouser		c.1266 First son of Rudolph I and Kunigunde of Eberstein	19 November 1288 – 12 July 1291	Margraviate of Eberstein	Agnes of Truhendingen; Before 6 October 1278 four children	12 July 1291 aged 24–25	Children of Rudolph I, ruled jointly. From 1290 the brothers shared land with the sons of Herman VII.
Rudolph II the Elder		c.1266 Second son of Rudolph I and Kunigunde of Eberstein	19 November 1288 – 14 February 1295	Margraviate of Baden (at Baden proper)	Adelaide of Ochsenstein; 2 May 1285 three children	14 February 1295 aged 28–29	Children of Rudolph I, ruled jointly. From 1290 the brothers shared land with the sons of Herman VII.
Rudolph III the Younger		c.1266 Third son of Rudolph I and Kunigunde of Eberstein	19 November 1288 – 2 February 1332	Margraviate of Baden (at Baden proper)	Jutta of Strassberg; 1306 no children	2 February 1332 aged 65–66	Children of Rudolph I, ruled jointly. From 1290 the brothers shared land with the sons of Herman VII.
Hesso		c.1268 Fourth son of Rudolph I and Kunigunde of Eberstein	19 November 1288 – 13 February 1297	Margraviate of Baden (at Baden proper)	Clara of Klingen; Before 1291 one child? Irmengard of Württemberg; Before 1295 no children Adelaide of Rieneck; Before 1299 one child	13 February 1297 aged 28–29	Children of Rudolph I, ruled jointly. From 1290 the brothers shared land with the sons of Herman VII.
Rudolph I		c.1250? First son of Henry II and Anna of Üsingen-Ketzingen	1289–1313	Margraviate of Sausenberg	Agnes of Rötteln; 1298 or 1299 three children	1313 aged 69–70?	Children of Henry II, split their inheritance.
Henry III		c.1260? Second son of Henry II and Anna of Üsingen-Ketzingen	1289–1330	Margraviate of Hachberg	Agnes of Hohenberg c.1305 three children	1330 aged 69–70?	Children of Henry II, split their inheritance.
Frederick II		c.1275 First son of Herman VII and Agnes of Truhendingen	12 July 1291 – 22 June 1333	Margraviate of Eberstein	Agnes of Weinsberg before 16 October 1312 one child Margaret of Vaihingen; Before 1333 four children	22 June 1333 aged 57–58	Children of Herman VII, divided the inheritance. After Herman VIII's childless death, another brother, Rudolph (who was already co-ruling with him), took over Pforzheim.
Herman VIII		c.1275 Second son of Herman VII and Agnes of Truhendingen	12 July 1291 – 1300	Margraviate of Pforzheim	Unmarried	1300 aged 24–25	Children of Herman VII, divided the inheritance. After Herman VIII's childless death, another brother, Rudolph (who was already co-ruling with him), took over Pforzheim.
Rudolph Hesso		c.1290 Son of Hesso and Adelaide of Rieneck	2 February 1332 – 17 August 1335 (co-ruling since 13 February 1297)	Margraviate of Baden	Joanna of Burgundy; Before 1335 two children	17 August 1335 aged 44–45	With no male heirs, Baden-Baden was inherited after his death by his cousin, Rudolf IV, Margrave of Baden-Pforzheim.
Rudolph IV		c.1275 Third son of Herman VII and Agnes of Truhendingen	1300 – 17 August 1335 (co-ruling since 12 July 1291)	Margraviate of Pforzheim	Liutgard of Bolanden (d.1325); 28 February 1318 no children Maria of Oettingen (d.10 June 1369); 18 February 1326 two children	25 June 1348 aged c.72-73?	Ruled Pforzheim with his brother Herman VIII until 1300, when he became sole ruler. Rudolph inherited Baden in 1335, after the death of his cousin Rudolph Hesso. Secured this inheritance by marrying the eldest of Rudolph Hesso's daughters to his own son.
Rudolph IV		c.1275 Third son of Herman VII and Agnes of Truhendingen	17 August 1335 – 25 June 1348	Margraviate of Baden	Liutgard of Bolanden (d.1325); 28 February 1318 no children Maria of Oettingen (d.10 June 1369); 18 February 1326 two children	25 June 1348 aged c.72-73?	Ruled Pforzheim with his brother Herman VIII until 1300, when he became sole ruler. Rudolph inherited Baden in 1335, after the death of his cousin Rudolph Hesso. Secured this inheritance by marrying the eldest of Rudolph Hesso's daughters to his own son.
Regency of Agnes of Rötteln (1313–1315)							
Henry		1300; First son of Rudolph I and Agnes of Rötteln	1313–1318	Margraviate of Sausenberg	Unmarried	1318 aged 17–18	
Henry IV		c.1305 Son of Henry III and Agnes of Hohenberg	1318–1369	Margraviate of Hachberg	Anna of Usenberg; Before 1369 four children	1369	
Rudolph II		1301; Second son of Rudolph I and Agnes of Rötteln	1318–1352	Margraviate of Sausenberg	Catherine of Thierstein c.1343 two children	1352 aged 50–51	Brothers of Henry, inherited Sausenberg jointly.
Otto		1302; Third son of Rudolph I and Agnes of Rötteln	1318–1384	Margraviate of Sausenberg	Catherine of Grandson no children Elisabeth of Strasbourg; Before 1352 no children	1384 aged 81–82	Brothers of Henry, inherited Sausenberg jointly.
Herman IX		c.1315 Son of Frederick II and Agnes of Weinsber	22 June 1333 – 13 April 1353	Margraviate of Eberstein	Matilda of Vaihingen c.3 June 1341 one child	13 April 1353 aged 37–38	Had a son, who predeceased him. At his death Eberstein returned to Baden.
Eberstein annexed to Baden
Frederick III the Peaceful		1327; First son of Rudolph IV and Maria of Oettingen	25 June 1348 – 2 September 1353	Margraviate of Baden	Margaret of Baden (d.1 September 1367); 1345 two children	2 September 1353 aged 25–26	Sons of Rudolph V, divided their inheritance. Frederick married his cousin Margaret, daughter of Rudolph Hesso. After Rudolph V's death without children, Pforzheim returned again to Baden-Baden, to the hands of his nephew Rudolph VI.
Rudolph V the Rouser		1328? Second son of Rudolph IV and Maria of Oettingen	25 June 1348 – 28 August 1361	Margraviate of Pforzheim	Adelaide of Belfort; 26 August 1347 no children	28 August 1361 aged 33–34?	Sons of Rudolph V, divided their inheritance. Frederick married his cousin Margaret, daughter of Rudolph Hesso. After Rudolph V's death without children, Pforzheim returned again to Baden-Baden, to the hands of his nephew Rudolph VI.
Pforzheim annexed to Baden
Regency of Margaret of Baden (1353–1359)							Inherited Pforzheim from his uncle, Rudolph V, in 1361, reuniting it with Baden. Under his rule, the Margraves of Baden were recognized for the first time as princeps regni(Reichsfürst).
Rudolph VI the Tall		c.1345 Son of Frederick III and Margaret of Baden	2 September 1353 – 21 March 1372	Margraviate of Baden	Matilda of Sponheim; 1356 three children	21 March 1372 aged 26–27	Inherited Pforzheim from his uncle, Rudolph V, in 1361, reuniting it with Baden. Under his rule, the Margraves of Baden were recognized for the first time as princeps regni(Reichsfürst).
Otto I		c.1330? First son of Henry IV and Anna of Usenberg	1369 – 9 July 1386	Margraviate of Hachberg	Unmarried	9 July 1386; Sempach aged 55–56?	Died at the Battle of Sempach, against the Swiss.
Regency of Matilda of Sponheim (1372–1378)							Children of Rudolph VI, divided the inheritance, which was reunited after Rudolph VII's childless death. In 1415 Bernard annexed the lands of Hachberg.
Bernard I		1364; First son of Rudolph VI and Matilda of Sponheim	21 March 1372 – 5 April 1431	Margraviate of Baden (at Durlach and Pforzheim)	Margaret of Hohenberg; 1 September 1384 (annulled 1391) no children Anna of Oettingen; 27 March 1398 ten children	5 April 1431; Baden aged 66–67	Children of Rudolph VI, divided the inheritance, which was reunited after Rudolph VII's childless death. In 1415 Bernard annexed the lands of Hachberg.
Rudolph VII		c.1365 Second son of Rudolph VI and Matilda of Sponheim	21 March 1372 – 1391	Margraviate of Baden (at Ettlingen, Rastatt and Baden)	Unmarried	1391 aged 25–26	Children of Rudolph VI, divided the inheritance, which was reunited after Rudolph VII's childless death. In 1415 Bernard annexed the lands of Hachberg.
Regencies of Otto, Margrave of Sausenberg (1352–1358) and Waleran II, Count of Thierstein (1358–1364)							
Rudolph III		1343; Son of Rudolph II and Catherine of Thierstein	1384 – 8 February 1428 (co-ruling since 1352)	Margraviate of Sausenberg	Adelaide of Lichtenberg; 1373 no children Anna of Freiburg; 1387 thirteen children	8 February 1428 aged 84–85	
John		c.1330? Second son of Henry IV and Anna of Usenberg	9 July 1386 – 1409	Margraviate of Hachberg	Unmarried	1409 aged c.78-79?	Brothers of Otto I, ruled jointly.
Hesso		c.1330? Third son of Henry IV and Anna of Usenberg	9 July 1386 – 1410	Margraviate of Hachberg	Anna of Geroldseck c.1350? three children Margaret of Tübingen; 1381 one child	1410 aged c.79-80?	Brothers of Otto I, ruled jointly.
Otto II		c.1350? Son of Hesso and Anna of Geroldseck	1410–1415	Margraviate of Hachberg	Unmarried	1418 aged c.77-78?	In 1415, possibly in debt, sold Hachberg to his cousin Bernard I of Baden-Baden.
Hachberg annexed to Baden
William		11 July 1406; Son of Rudolph III and Anne of Freiburg-Neuchâtel	8 February 1428 – 21 June 1441	Margraviate of Sausenberg	Elisabeth, Countess of Montfort-Bregenz; 1425 (annulled 1436) three children	15 August 1482; Môtiers aged 76	Abdicated in 1441 for his sons.
James I		15 March 1407; Hachberg; Son of Bernard I and Anna of Oettingen	5 April 1431 – 13 October 1453	Margraviate of Baden	Catherine of Lorraine; 25 July 1422 seven children	13 October 1453; Mühlburg aged 47	
Regency of John, Count of Freiburg and Neuchâtel (1441–1444)							Sons of Wiliam I, ruled jointly. In 1458, Rudolph inherited the Swiss county of Neuchâtel.
Rudolph IV		1426/27; Rötteln; First son of William and Elisabeth, Countess of Montfort-Bregenz	21 June 1441 – 12 April 1487	12 April 1487; Rötteln aged 59–61	Margraviate of Sausenberg	Margaret of Vienne c.1450 two children	Sons of Wiliam I, ruled jointly. In 1458, Rudolph inherited the Swiss county of Neuchâtel.
Hugo		c.1430 Rötteln; Second son of William and Elisabeth, Countess of Montfort-Bregenz	21 June 1441 – 1444	1444	Margraviate of Sausenberg	Unmarried	Sons of Wiliam I, ruled jointly. In 1458, Rudolph inherited the Swiss county of Neuchâtel.
Charles I the Warrior		1427; Pforzheim; First son of James I and Catherine of Lorraine	13 October 1453 – 24 February 1475	Margraviate of Baden	Catherine of Austria; 1 July 1447 six children	24 February 1475; Pforzheim aged 47–48	Children of James, ruled jointly. Bernard spent most of his income assisting the poor and those in need.
Bernard II		1428; Baden; Second son of James I and Catherine of Lorraine	13 October 1453 – 15 July 1458	Margraviate of Baden	Unmarried	15 July 1458; Moncalieri aged 29–30	Children of James, ruled jointly. Bernard spent most of his income assisting the poor and those in need.
Christopher I		13 November 1453; Baden; First son of Charles I and Catherine of Austria	24 February 1475 – 1515	Margraviate of Baden	Ottilie of Katzenelnbogen; 30 January 1469 fifteen children	19 April 1527; Baden aged 73	Children of Charles, divided the inheritance. In 1503 Christopher annexed Sausenberg. From 1488, Christopher ruled an unified Baden, but abdicated for his sons, who divided Baden again.
Albert		1456; Hachberg; Second son of Charles I and Catherine of Austria	24 February 1475 – 1488	Margraviate of Baden (at Hachberg)	Unmarried	1488; Damme aged 31–32	Children of Charles, divided the inheritance. In 1503 Christopher annexed Sausenberg. From 1488, Christopher ruled an unified Baden, but abdicated for his sons, who divided Baden again.
Philip		1454; Neuchâtel; Son of Rudolph IV and Margaret of Vienne	12 April 1487 – 9 September 1503	Margraviate of Sausenberg	Maria of Savoy; October 1478 one child	9 September 1503; Montpellier aged 48–49	Also count of Neuchâtel. Didn't have male heirs and Baden-Hachberg Sausenberg was incorporated in Baden-Baden. However, his possessions in Neuchâtel passed to his daughter Joanna.
Sausenberg annexed to Baden
Joanna		1485; Neuchâtel; Daughter of Philip and Maria of Savoy	9 September 1503 – 23 September 1543	Margraviate of Sausenberg (at Neuchâtel only)	Louis I d'Orléans, duke of Longueville; 1504 four children	23 September 1543; Époisses aged 57–58	Inherited her father's county of Neuchâtel.
Neuchâtel inherited by the House of Orléans
Bernard III		7 October 1474; Baden; First son of Christopher I and Ottilie of Katzenelnbogen	1515 – 19 June 1536	Margraviate of Baden	Franziska of Luxembourg-Ligny; 1535 two children	29 June 1536; Baden aged 61	Children of Christopher, divided their inheritance. After Bernard's death his lands were divided again between his sons, then still minors. Philip had no sons, and his part reverted to Baden. Ernest abdicated for his son.
Philip I		6 November 1479; Baden; Second son of Christopher I and Ottilie of Katzenelnbogen	1515 – 17 September 1533	Margraviate of Baden (at Sponheim)	Elisabeth of the Palatinate; 3 January 1503; Heidelberg six children	17 September 1533 aged 53	Children of Christopher, divided their inheritance. After Bernard's death his lands were divided again between his sons, then still minors. Philip had no sons, and his part reverted to Baden. Ernest abdicated for his son.
Ernest I		7 October 1482; Pforzheim; Third son of Christopher I and Ottilie of Katzenelnbogen	1515 – 26 September 1552	Margraviate of Durlach	Elisabeth of Brandenburg-Ansbach-Kulmbach; 29 September 1510 seven children Ursula of Rosenfeld; 1518 (morganatic) three children Anna Bombast of Hohenheim; 1 March 1544 (morganatic) no children	6 February 1553; Sulzburg aged 70	Children of Christopher, divided their inheritance. After Bernard's death his lands were divided again between his sons, then still minors. Philip had no sons, and his part reverted to Baden. Ernest abdicated for his son.
Regency of Franziska of Luxembourg-Ligny (1536–1554)							Children of Bernard III, divided their inheritance.
Philibert I	´	22 January 1536; Baden; First son of Bernard III and Franziska of Luxembourg-Ligny	19 June 1536 – 3 October 1569	Margraviate of Baden	Matilda of Bavaria; 17 January 1557 four children	3 October 1569; Moncontour aged 33	Children of Bernard III, divided their inheritance.
Christopher II		26 February 1537; Baden; Second (posthumous) son of Bernard III and Franziska of Luxembourg-Ligny	26 February 1537 – 2 August 1575	Margraviate of Rodemarchern	Cecilia of Sweden; 11 November 1564; Stockholm six children	2 August 1575; Rodemachern aged 38	Children of Bernard III, divided their inheritance.
Bernard IV the Younger		1517; Pforzheim; Son of Ernest and Elisabeth of Brandenburg-Kulmbach	26 September 1552 – 20 January 1553	Margraviate of Durlach	Unmarried	20 January 1553; Pforzheim aged 35–36	Left no heirs. The land goes to his brother, Charles II.
Charles II		24 July 1529; Pforzheim; Son of Ernest and Ursula of Rosenfeld	20 January 1553 – 23 March 1577	Margraviate of Durlach	Kunigunde of Brandenburg-Kulmbach; 10 March 1551 two children Anna of the Palatinate-Veldenz; 1 August 1558; Heidelberg six children	23 March 1577; Durlach aged 47	After his death Baden-Durlach was divided between his three minor sons.
Regency of Albert V, Duke of Bavaria (1569–1577)							The Catholic rite was reintroduced on Baden. Left no descendants. Baden-Baden is inherited by his cousin Edward Fortunatus, of the branch of Baden-Rodemachern.
Philip II		19 February 1559; Baden; Son of Philibert I and Matilda of Bavaria	3 October 1569 – 7 June 1588	Margraviate of Baden	Unmarried	7 June 1588; Baden aged 29	The Catholic rite was reintroduced on Baden. Left no descendants. Baden-Baden is inherited by his cousin Edward Fortunatus, of the branch of Baden-Rodemachern.
Regency of William V, Duke of Bavaria (1575–1579)							Inherited Baden-Baden in 1588 from his cousin Philip III. In the same year he abdicated of Baden-Baden-Rodemachern to his younger brother Philip IV. In 1594 Baden was occupied by Durlach.
Edward Fortunatus		17 September 1565; London; First son of Christopher II and Cecilia of Sweden	2 August 1575 – 8 June 1600	Margraviate of Rodemachern	Maria van Eicken; 13 March 1591; Brussels four children	8 June 1600; Kastellaun aged 34	Inherited Baden-Baden in 1588 from his cousin Philip III. In the same year he abdicated of Baden-Baden-Rodemachern to his younger brother Philip IV. In 1594 Baden was occupied by Durlach.
Edward Fortunatus		17 September 1565; London; First son of Christopher II and Cecilia of Sweden	7 June 1588 – 1594	Margraviate of Baden	Maria van Eicken; 13 March 1591; Brussels four children	8 June 1600; Kastellaun aged 34	Inherited Baden-Baden in 1588 from his cousin Philip III. In the same year he abdicated of Baden-Baden-Rodemachern to his younger brother Philip IV. In 1594 Baden was occupied by Durlach.
Regency of Anna of the Palatinate-Veldenz, Louis III, Duke of Württemberg and Louis VI, Elector Palatine (1577–1584)							Children of Charles II. The oldest son, Ernest Frederick, received the remaining Baden-Durlach and occupied the main margraviate of Baden, but left no descendants, which meant that his lands were inherited by his brother George Frederick, who then ruled at Sausenberg. James III received Hachberg, and passed it to his minor son, a minority in which Ernest Frederick took the opportunity to merge with his domains. George Frederick was the inheritor of Ernest Frederick, but was defeated by his kinsman William II, son of Edward Fortunatus, and abdicated.
Ernest Frederick		17 October 1560; Durlach; First son of Charles II, Margrave of Baden-Durlach and Anna of the Palatinate-Veldenz	23 March 1577 – 14 April 1604	Margraviate of Durlach	Anne of East Frisia; 21 December 1585 no children	14 April 1604; Remchingen aged 43	
Ernest Frederick		17 October 1560; Durlach; First son of Charles II, Margrave of Baden-Durlach and Anna of the Palatinate-Veldenz	1594 – 14 April 1604	Margraviate of Baden	Anne of East Frisia; 21 December 1585 no children	14 April 1604; Remchingen aged 43	
James III		26 May 1562; Pforzheim; Second son of Charles II, Margrave of Baden-Durlach and Anna of the Palatinate-Veldenz	23 March 1577 – 17 August 1590	Margraviate of Hachberg	Elisabeth of Culemborg-Pallandt; 6 September 1584 four children	17 August 1590; Emmendingen aged 28	
George Frederick		30 January 1573; Baden; Third son of Charles II, Margrave of Baden-Durlach and Anna of the Palatinate-Veldenz	23 March 1577 – 26 August 1622	Margraviate of Durlach (at Sausenberg 1577–1604; in Durlach proper 1604–1622)	Juliana Ursula of Salm-Neuviller; 2 July 1592 fifteen children Agatha of Erbach-Breuberg; 23 October 1614 three children Elizabeth Stolz; 29 July 1621 (morganatic) no children	24 September 1638; Strasbourg aged 65	
George Frederick		30 January 1573; Baden; Third son of Charles II, Margrave of Baden-Durlach and Anna of the Palatinate-Veldenz	14 April 1604 – 26 August 1622	Margraviate of Baden	Juliana Ursula of Salm-Neuviller; 2 July 1592 fifteen children Agatha of Erbach-Breuberg; 23 October 1614 three children Elizabeth Stolz; 29 July 1621 (morganatic) no children	24 September 1638; Strasbourg aged 65	
Regency of Ernest Frederick, Margrave of Baden-Durlach (1590–1591)							Died in infancy, under the illegal regency of his uncle, who also annexed his margraviate.
Ernest James		24 August 1590; Posthumous son of James III and Elisabeth of Culemborg-Pallandt	24 August 1590 – 29 May 1591	Margraviate of Hachberg	Unmarried	29 May 1591 aged 0	Died in infancy, under the illegal regency of his uncle, who also annexed his margraviate.
Hachberg annexed to Baden
Philip III		15 August 1567; Rodemachern; Second son of Christopher II and Cecilia of Sweden	8 June 1600 – 6 November 1620	Margraviate of Rodemarchern	Unmarried	6 November 1620; Emmendingen aged 53	Inherited Baden-Baden-Rodemachern in 1588 from his older brother Edward Fortunatus, who abdicated on him. After his death Rodemachern passed to his nephew and second son of Edward Fortunatus, Herman.
Herman Fortunatus		23 January 1595; Rastatt; Second son of Edward Fortunatus and Maria van Eicken	6 November 1620 – 4 January 1665	Margraviate of Rodemarchern	Antonia Elisabeth of Criechingen; 18 April 1627 three children Maria Sidonia of Daun-Falkenstein; After 1635 two children	4 January 1665; Kastellaun aged 69	Children of Edward Fortunatus, inherited different margraviates. Herman inherited from rodemachern his uncle Philip, while William was invested with the main margraviate of Baden.
William		30 July 1593; Baden; First son of Edward Fortunatus and Maria van Eicken	26 August 1622 – 22 May 1677	Margraviate of Baden	Catherine Ursula of Hohenzollern-Hechingen; 13 October 1624 fourteen children Maria Magdalena of Oettingen-Baldern; 1650; Vienna five children	22 May 1677; Baden aged 69	Children of Edward Fortunatus, inherited different margraviates. Herman inherited from rodemachern his uncle Philip, while William was invested with the main margraviate of Baden.
Frederick V the Kinsman		6 July 1594; Sulzburg; Son of George Frederick and Juliana Ursula of Salm-Neuviller	26 August 1622 – 8 September 1659	Margraviate of Durlach	Barbara of Württemberg; 21 December 1616 seven children Eleonore of Solms-Laubach; 8 October 1627 three children Maria Elisabeth of Waldeck-Eisenberg; 21 January 1634 no children Anna Maria von Hohen-Geroldseck; 13 February 1644 no children Eusebia Elisabeth of Fürstenberg; 20 May 1650 no children	8 September 1659; Durlach aged 65	
Frederick VI the Turkish		16 November 1617; Durlach; Son of Frederick V and Barbara of Württemberg	8 September 1659 – 31 January 1677	Margraviate of Durlach	Christina Magdalena of the Palatinate-Kleeburg; 30 November 1642; Stockholm eight children Johanna Bayer; After 1662 (morganatic) two children	31 January 1677; Durlach aged 59	
Charles William		December 1627; Son of Herman Fortunatus and Antonia Elisabeth of Criechingen	4 January 1665 – 4 November 1666	Margraviate of Rodemarchern	Unmarried	4 November 1666 aged 38	Died without descendants and his lands reverted to Baden.
Rodemachern annexed to Baden
Louis William the Turkish		8 April 1655; Paris; Son of Ferdinand Maximilian, Hereditary Prince of Baden and Louise Christine of Savoy	22 May 1677 – 4 January 1707	Margraviate of Baden	Sibylle of Saxe-Lauenburg; 27 March 1690; Ostrov ten children	4 January 1707; Rastatt aged 51	Grandson of William. Made war with France.
Frederick VII Magnus		23 September 1647; Ueckermünde; Son of Frederick VI and Christina Magdalena of the Palatinate-Kleeburg	31 January 1677 – 25 June 1709	Margraviate of Durlach	Augusta Marie of Holstein-Gottorp; 15 May 1670; Husum eleven children	25 June 1709; Durlach aged 61	
Regency of Sibylle of Saxe-Lauenburg (1707–1727)							Sibylle has been credited with the reconstruction of Baden-Baden, which had been ravaged greatly by the French during various wars.
Louis George the Hunter		7 June 1702; Ettlingen; Third son of Louis William and Sibylle of Saxe-Lauenburg	4 January 1707 – 22 October 1761	Margraviate of Baden	Maria Anna of Schwarzenberg; 8 April 1721; Český Krumlov four children Maria Anna Josepha of Bavaria; 20 July 1755; Ettlingen no children	22 October 1761; Rastatt aged 59	Sibylle has been credited with the reconstruction of Baden-Baden, which had been ravaged greatly by the French during various wars.
Charles III William		27 January 1679; Durlach; Son of Frederick VII Magnus and Augusta Marie of Holstein-Gottorp	25 June 1709 – 12 May 1738	Margraviate of Durlach	Magdalena Wilhelmine of Württemberg; 27 June 1697 (separated 1715) three children	12 May 1738; Karlsruhe aged 59	
August George		14 January 1706; Rastatt; Fifth son of Louis William and Sibylle of Saxe-Lauenburg	22 October 1761 – 21 October 1771	Margraviate of Baden	Maria Victoria of Arenberg; 7 December 1735; Rastatt no children	21 October 1771; Rastatt aged 65	Last male member of the Baden-Baden line, after his death without heirs Baden-Baden fell to the Baden-Durlach line, who reunited all Baden.
Regencies of Magdalena Wilhelmine of Württemberg (1738–1742) and Charles August of Baden-Durlach (1738–1746)							Grandson of Charles III William. In 1746 attained majority. In 1771 inherited the Baden-Baden lands and reunified the margraviate of Baden.In 1803 became Elector.
Charles Frederick		22 November 1728; Karlsruhe; Son of Frederick, Hereditary Prince of Baden-Durlach and Amalia of Nassau-Dietz	12 May 1738 – 21 October 1771	Margraviate of Durlach	Caroline Louise of Hesse-Darmstadt; 28 January 1751 five children Louise Caroline of Hochberg; 24 November 1787 (morganatic) five children	10 June 1811; Karlsruhe aged 82	Grandson of Charles III William. In 1746 attained majority. In 1771 inherited the Baden-Baden lands and reunified the margraviate of Baden.In 1803 became Elector.
Charles Frederick		22 November 1728; Karlsruhe; Son of Frederick, Hereditary Prince of Baden-Durlach and Amalia of Nassau-Dietz	21 October 1771 – 27 April 1803	Margraviate of Baden	Caroline Louise of Hesse-Darmstadt; 28 January 1751 five children Louise Caroline of Hochberg; 24 November 1787 (morganatic) five children	10 June 1811; Karlsruhe aged 82	Grandson of Charles III William. In 1746 attained majority. In 1771 inherited the Baden-Baden lands and reunified the margraviate of Baden.In 1803 became Elector.
Durlach annexed to Baden

== Elector of Baden, 1803–1806 ==
Elector of Baden
Baden Dynasty
Image	Name (Birth–Death)	Began	Ended	Notes
	Charles Frederick; Karl Friedrich (1728–1811)	27 April 1803	25 July 1806	The first and only Elector of Baden. Became Grand Duke of Baden.

== Grand Dukes of Baden, 1806–1918 ==
Grand Dukes of Baden
Baden Dynasty
Image	Name (Birth–Death)	Began	Ended	Notes
	Charles Frederick; Karl Friedrich (1728–1811)	25 July 1806	10 June 1811	
	Charles I Karl I (1786–1818)	10 June 1811	8 December 1818	Grandson of Charles Frederick.
	Louis I Ludwig I (1763–1830)	8 December 1818	30 March 1830	Uncle of Charles.
	Leopold I Leopold I (1790–1852)	30 March 1830	24 April 1852	Half-brother of Louis I.
	Louis II; Ludwig II (1824–1858)	24 April 1852	22 January 1858	Son of Leopold I. Ruled under the regency of his brother Frederick.
	Frederick I Friedrich I (1826–1907)	22 January 1858	28 September 1907	Brother of Louis II. Served as regent 1852–1858. Took the title of Grand Duke in 1856. Became a subordinate ruler in the German Empire after the Unification of Germany in 1871.
	Frederick II; Friedrich II (1857–1928)	28 September 1907	22 November 1918	Son of Frederick I. The last Grand Duke of Baden. Abdicated in the German Revolution of 1918–1919.

== See also ==
- List of consorts of rulers of Baden
- List of presidents of Baden (1918–1945)
- House of Zähringen
- History of Baden-Württemberg
- Coat of arms of Baden
