= Margraviate of Baden-Hachberg =

Territory of the Holy Roman Empire

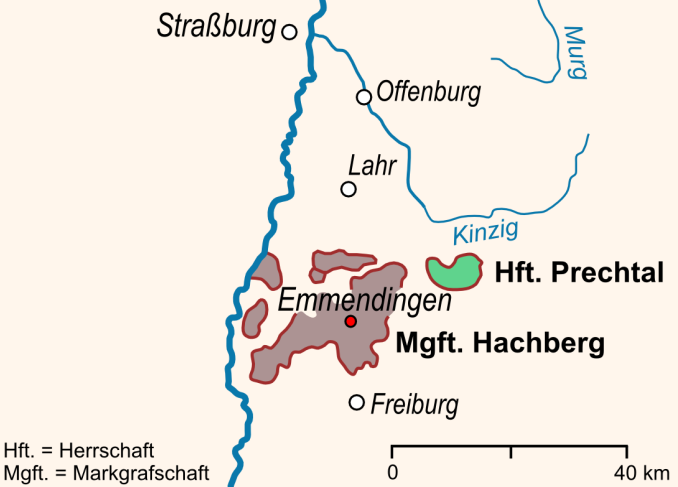
location in Baden

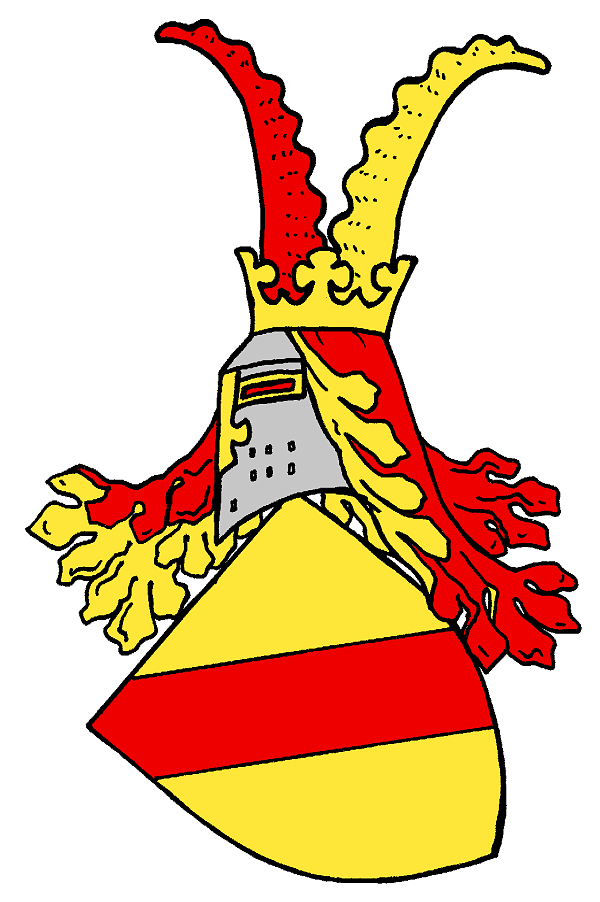
Arms of Baden-Hachberg

The Margraviate of Baden-Hachberg was a territory of the Holy Roman Empire, in the upper Rhine valley, which existed from 1212 to 1415.

== History ==
The Margraviate came into being around 1212 by splitting off from the Margraviate of Baden. Henry I, Margrave of Baden-Hachberg and his brother Herman V, Margrave of Baden-Baden shared the inheritance of their father Herman IV, Margrave of Baden, who had died in 1190. The center of the Margraviate was the stronghold on the Hochburg (Hachberg) near Emmendingen. In the course of the 13th century, the Hachberg line was able to assert itself against the competition from the Counts of Freiburg in the area between the Black Forest and the Rhine (Breisgau). The Margraviate of Baden-Hachberg existed as an independent territory until 1415, when Otto II von Hachberg sold his property to Bernard I, Margrave of Baden-Baden.

The Margraviate of Baden-Hachberg was briefly recreated between 1584 and 1590, when it was separated from Margraviate of Baden-Durlach and ruled by the Margrave's second son James III, Margrave of Baden-Hachberg until his death in 1590, after which it was reunited with Baden-Durlach.

== List of Margraves of Baden-Hachberg ==
- Henry I (1212–1231)
- Henry II (1232–1290)
- Henry III (1290–1330), allows new side-line of Baden-Hachberg-Sausenberg
- Henry IV (1330–1369)
- Otto I (1369–1386), killed in the Battle of Sempach against the Swiss.
- John I (1386–1409)
- Hesso (1386–1410), ruled jointly with John I
- Otto II (1410–1415)

== Sources ==
- Hachberg Library
- de:Markgrafschaft Baden-Hachberg German Wikipedia
