= Hochburg =

Castle ruin in SW Germany

Coordinates: 48°07′00″N 7°54′02″E

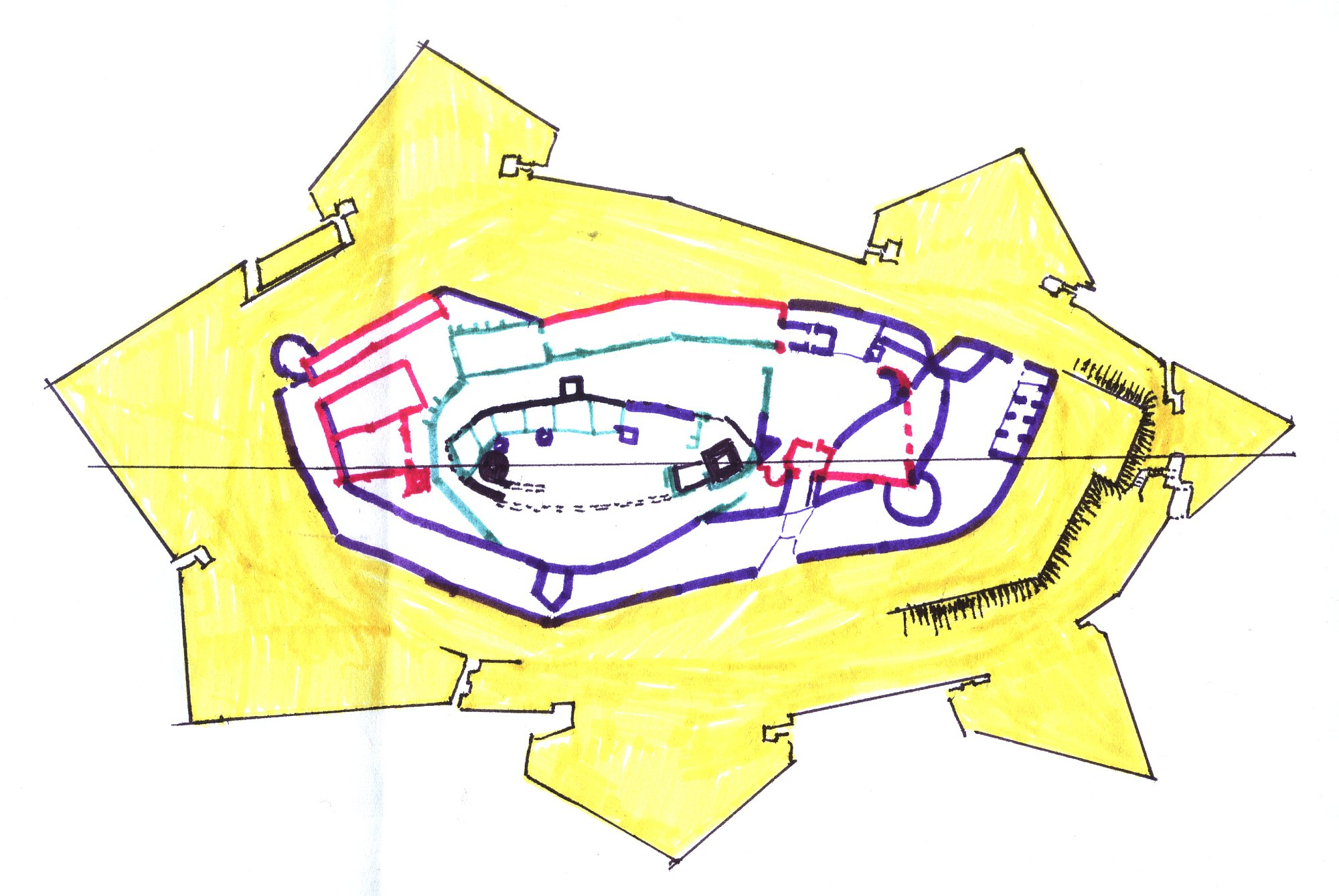
Hochburg Layout

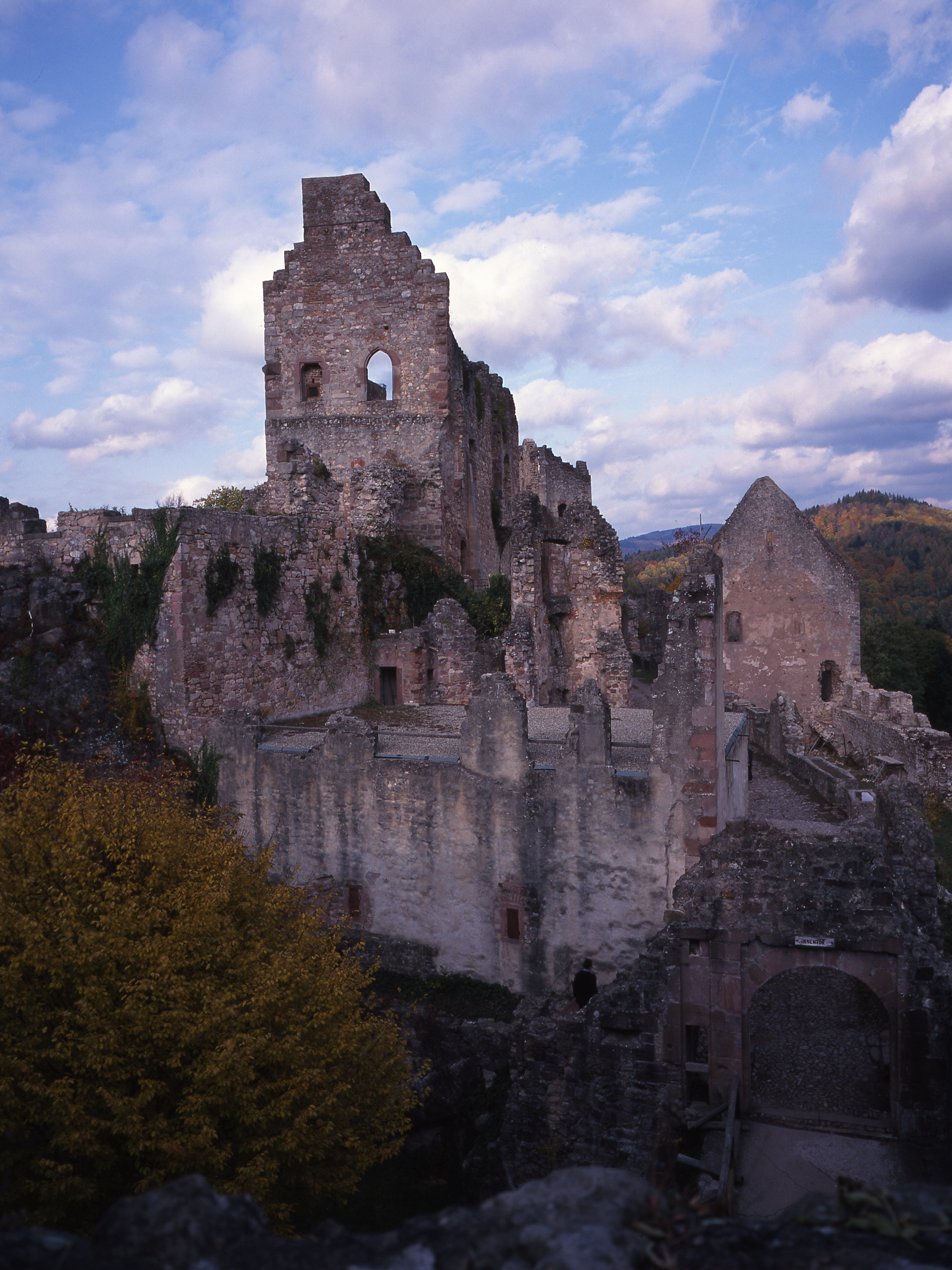
Detail

The Hochburg ("high castle") is a castle ruin situated between the city of Emmendingen and the village of Sexau in the region of Baden, located in the southwest of Germany. It was presumably built in the 11th century and was originally known as castle Hachberg. The line of nobles known as the Margraves of Baden-Hachberg most likely derive their name from this castle and before it was razed by the French it was the second largest fortification in Baden.

== The name ==
Historians are uncertain about where the name Hachberg comes from. One theory is that an estate in the region was given to a man referred to as Hacho who was a part of Charlemagnes retinue. This hypothesis is also supported by an engraved plaque added to the castle by Karl II and a document dating back to 1161 mentions it as Castro Hahberc. In any case, whoever the true builder of the castle is most likely chose its name for their lineage, resulting in the family sidebranch of the house of Baden known as Baden-Hachberg.

The first mention of a transition from Hachberg to Hochberg can be found in French sources concerned with members of the lineage of Hachberg-Sausenberg, who were the counts of Neuenburg as well.

The name Hochberg sees its German revival as late as 1787, when Margrave Karl Friedrich, as second husband, married Luise Karoline Freiin Geyer von Geyersberg and made her the Imperial Countess of Hochberg.

== History ==
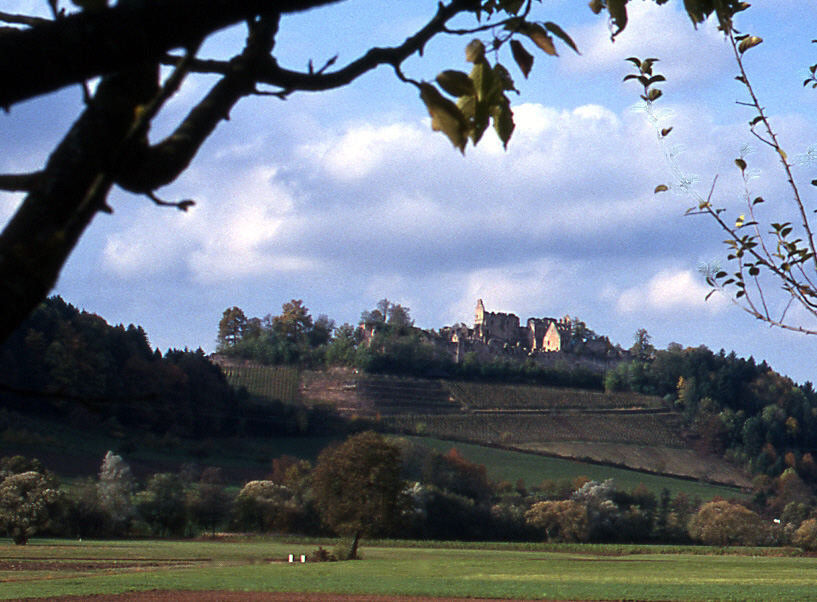
Hochburg Today

=== The Lords of Hachberg ===
Dietrich von Emmendingen (who later called himself von Hachberg) most likely founded the castle to harvest the forests surrounding it for lumber. Its first mention dates back to a document from 1127. The further development of later property documents suggests that Erkenbold von Hachberg, the last of his name, gave his holdings to the Zähringer to finance his participation in the crusades (1147–1149).

=== The Margraves of Baden 1161–1212 ===
A document on the talks about the founding of the monastery Tennenbach from 1161 implies that Hermann IV von Baden was the reigning lord of castle Hachberg at the time. When his sons Hermann V and Henrich I divided the margraviate among each other in 1212 the castle became the centre of power for the margraves of Baden-Hachberg.

=== The Margraves of Baden-Hachberg 1212–1415 ===
The Margraves of Baden-Hachberg ruled from the Hochburg for two centuries, until Margrave Bernhard I, of the main family of Baden, acquired the castle in 1415 from the highly indebted Otto II, last Margrave of Baden-Hachberg.

=== The Margraves of Baden 1415-1535 ===
The castle survived the war of the Oberrheinischer Städtebund versus Bernhard I in 1424 and even withstood siege during the German Peasant's War in 1525.

=== The Margraves of Baden-Durlach 1535–1771 ===
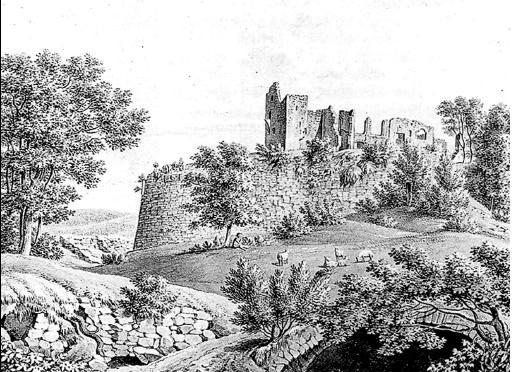
Hochburg 1770

Karl II greatly enhanced the castle's defences in 1553 and turned it into a more modern, renaissance style fortification.

Margrave Georg Friedrich added 7 bastions around the castle's perimeter and gave some the names of Hachbergs sister castles in Baden all of which laid in the realm of Margraves of Baden-Durlach. (Bastion Rötteln; Bastion Sausenberg; Bastion Badenweiler)

The castle was besieged for two years during the Thirty Years' War in 1634 and was slighted for the first time after surrendering to the attackers. However, in 1660 Margrave Friedrich VI induced the reconstruction of the castle.

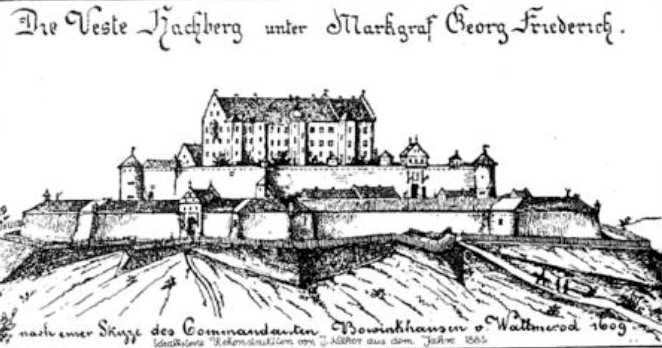
Hochburg 1609

==== Demolition ====
In 1681 the defences were destroyed voluntarily by the French after they had taken many of the holdings in Baden through the Treaty of peace of Nijmegen and a manned castle Hachberg could have posed a sizable threat to their new territory. Only three years later peasants caused a fire which destroyed the remaining living quarters. And in 1688 French troops destroyed what little remained of the fortification, turning it into a ruin.

=== Preservation of the ruin ===
The first steps at preserving the ruin were taken towards the end of the 19th century and still persist to this day. Work was only temporarily halted during the two world wars. The Society for the conservation of the Hochburg has been taking care of the ruin on voluntary work since 1971 and in 2007 they bought the tenancy of the castle.

== Today ==
The Hochburg can be visited by anyone free of charge. It is part of the program for the state preservation of castles and gardens in Baden-Württemberg and in 1991 a small museum was added in the cellar. The castle has been depicted in several paintings and has many mythical tales surrounding it, speaking of hidden treasure and restless knights, waiting to return.
