= Henry II of Baden-Hachberg =

Henry II, Margrave of Baden-Hachberg
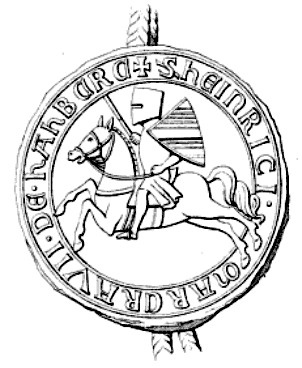
- + S[IGILLUM] HEINRICI MARGRAVII DE HAHBERG
- Born: before 1231
- Died: c. 1297/1298
- Noble family: House of Zähringen
- Spouse: Anne of Üsingen-Ketzingen
- Issue: Rudolf I, Margrave of Hachberg-Sausenberg
- Father: Henry I, Margrave of Baden-Hachberg
- Mother: Agnes of Urach

Henry II, Margrave of Baden-Hachberg (before 1231 – c. 1297/1298) was the ruling Margrave of Baden-Hachberg from 1231 to 1289.

== Life ==
Henry II was the eldest son of Margrave Henry I of Baden-Hachberg and his wife, Agnes, a daughter of Count Egino IV of Urach. In 1231, he succeeded his father as Margrave of Baden-Hachberg. Since he was a minor at the time, he initially stood under the guardianship of his mother. He was the first in his line of the House of Zähringen to style himself Margrave of Hachberg. In 1232, he purchased the Lordship of Sausenburg from St. Blaise Abbey. Soon afterwards, he built Sausenburg Castle, which was first mentioned in 1246.

He had disputes with the spiritual rulers in the area and with the Counts of Freiburg about the entangled rights and privileges they had (or claimed to have) on each other's possessions. In 1250, some imperial and Hohenstaufen possessions became available for the taking after Emperor Frederick II had died. Henry II grabbed some of these land and managed round off his territory.

For several years, he supported Count Rudolph of Habsburg in his disputes against the bishops of Basel and Strasbourg. In 1273, he supported Rudolph in his bid to become King of the Romans. He also supported Rudolph in his dispute against the main line of the Margraves of Baden. During the war against Bohemia, Henry II fought on the imperial side in the decisive Battle on the Marchfeld.

He was a patron of the monasteries Tennenbach and Adelhausen.

Henry II abdicated in 1289, and joined the Teutonic Knights.

== Marriage and issue ==
Henry II was married to Anne, a daughter of Count Rudolph II of Üsingen-Ketzingen. They had the following children:

- Henry III, his successor as Margrave of Baden-Hachberg
- Rudolf I, the first Margrave of Hachberg-Sausenberg
- Frederick, who also joined the Teutonic Knights
- Verena, married Egino I, Count of Fürstenberg
- Herman I, joined the Knights Hospitaller
- Kunigunde, a nun at Adelhausen
- Agnes, married Walter of Reichenberg
- Elisabeth, also a nun at Adelhausen

== Footnotes ==
Henry II of Baden-Hachberg House of Zähringen Born: before 1231 Died: c. 1297/1298
Preceded by Henry I	Margrave of Baden-Hachberg; 1231-1289	Succeeded by Henry III in Hachberg; Rudolf I in Sausenberg
