= Henry III of Baden-Hachberg =

Henry III, Margrave of Baden-Hachberg
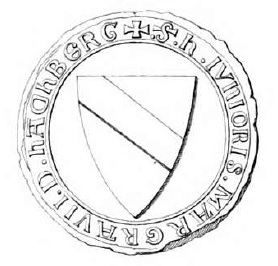
- Seal of Margrave Henry III of Baden-Hachberg from 1300
- Born: c. 1260
- Died: 1330
- Noble family: House of Baden
- Spouse: Agnes of Hohenberg
- Issue: Henry IV, Margrave of Baden-Hachberg
- Father: Henry II, Margrave of Baden-Hachberg
- Mother: Anna of Üsenberg

Henry III of Baden-Hachberg (c. 1260 – 1330) was the Margrave of Hachberg and Lord of Kenzingen from 1289 to 1330.

== Life ==
Henry was the second son of Margrave Henry II of Baden-Hachberg and his wife, Anna of Üsenberg (d. 1286).

After his father's abdicated in 1289, Henry initially took over the rule of all Baden-Hachberg, which he jointly ruled with his brother Rudolf. In 1297 they jointly confirmed their father's donation of the city of Heitersheim to the Order of St. John, which their late father had requested.

In 1306, the brothers divided their land, with Henry receiving the town of Emmendingen, its ancestral seat of Hochburg and the possessions in the lower Breisgau, while Rudolf received Sausenburg castle, Saint Blaise Abbey and the possessions in the upper Breisgau. Henry thus continued the Baden-Hachberg (Note: Sometimes also called Hachberg-Hachberg) line, while Rudolf founded the Hachberg-Sausenberg branch.

== Marriage and issue ==
Henry married Agnes of Hohenberg (d. April 14, 1310) and had three children with her:

- Henry IV, Margrave of Baden-Hachberg;
- Rodolphe (d. 1343), Commander of the Order of St. John;
- Herman (d. 1356), Master of the German Knights of St. John.

== Notes ==
Henry III of Baden-Hachberg House of Baden Born: c. 1260 Died: 1330
Preceded by Henry II	Margrave of Baden-Hachberg; 1289-1330	Succeeded by Henry IV
