= Coat of arms of Baden =

Coat of arms of the Margraves and Grand Dukes of Baden
- Adopted: 1243
- Crest: Issuant from a crest coronet a peacock plume proper between two ostrich feathers the dexter or and the sinister gules
- Shield: Or a bend gules
- Supporters: Two griffins rampant regardant argent
- Other elements: Mantling: gules doubled or

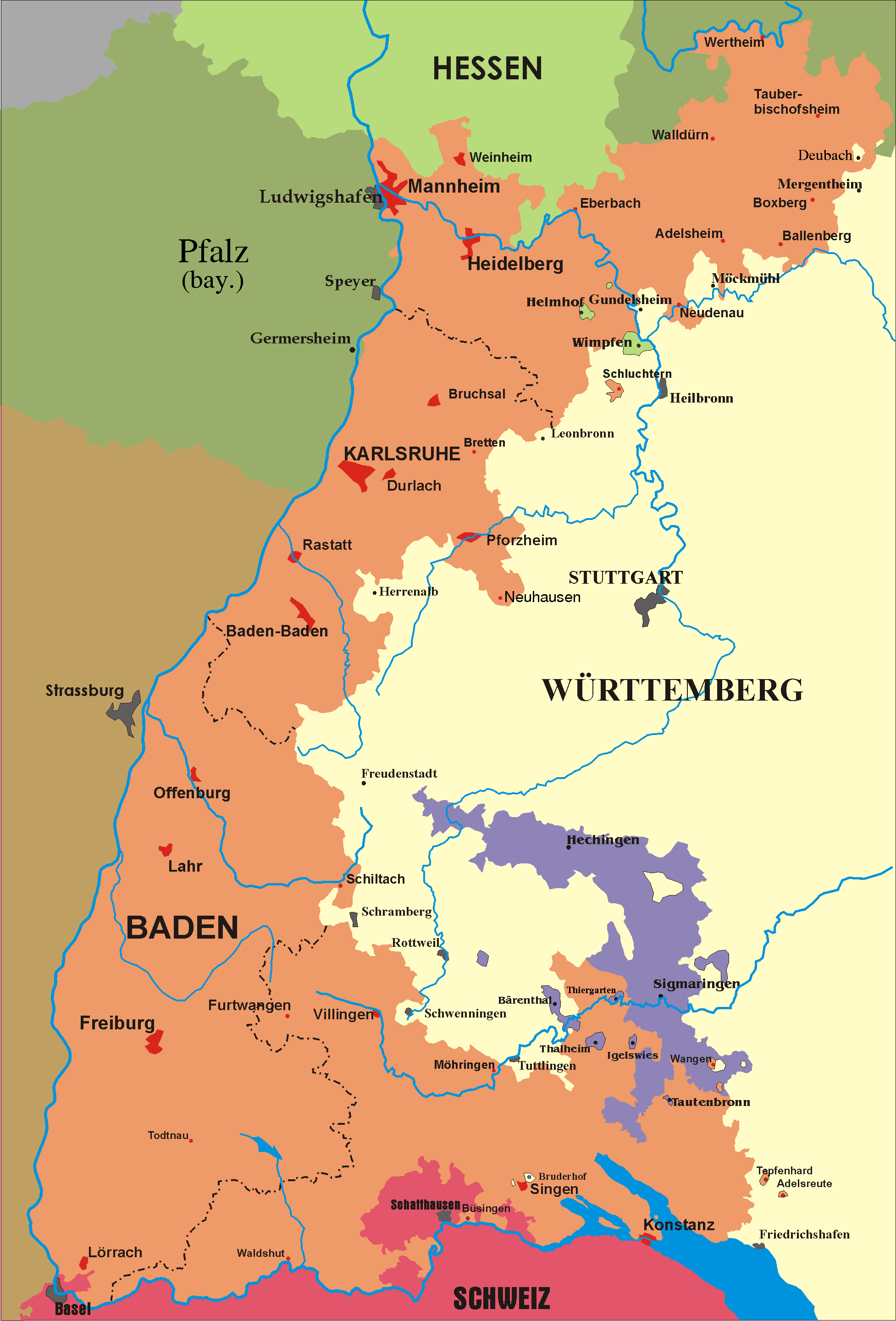
The historical state of Baden, in present-day Baden-Württemberg, Germany

The coat of arms of Baden comes from the personal arms of the Margraves and Grand Dukes of Baden, the traditional rulers of the region. Following the revolution and abolition of the Grand Duchy in 1918, the arms and griffin supporters were usurped from the Grand Dukes by the new republic to represent the people and country.

Baden entered as a state of the Weimar Republic the year following the revolution, and subsequently went through several changes and redistricting after World War II. Baden is today part of the federal state of Baden-Württemberg in Germany, where one can still see the arms of Baden represented in the coat of arms of Baden-Württemberg, as a badge atop the modern federal state's arms.

== History ==
The House of Baden is a junior branch of the House of Zähringen, which itself is related to the Hohenstaufen family, and was founded by Hermann I of Baden, The Margrave of Verona, son of Berthold I, The Duke of Carinthia, in the eleventh century. The arms of the house of Zähringen share the same tinctures with its junior branch, though they display a red eagle on a yellow shield. The first picture of the coat of arms with the bend dates from the year 1243, but it may have already been in use before this. The Wijnbergen Armorial, compiled from the years 1265 to 1270, lists the arms of "le margreue de badene" as "d'or à la bande de gueules." The supporting griffins were later added by margrave Phillip I in 1528.

== Gallery ==
Small arms of Baden used in various ways since 1243

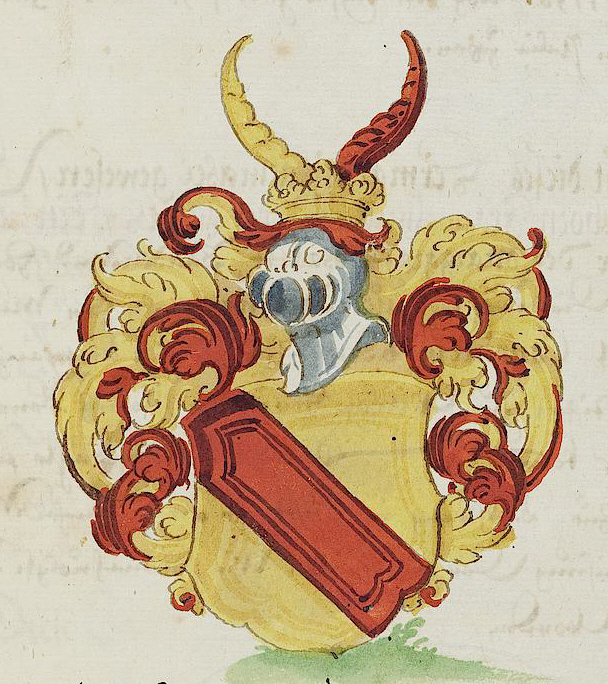
Arms of the Margraviate of Baden with a crest from 1591

Arms of Margraviate of Baden-Baden

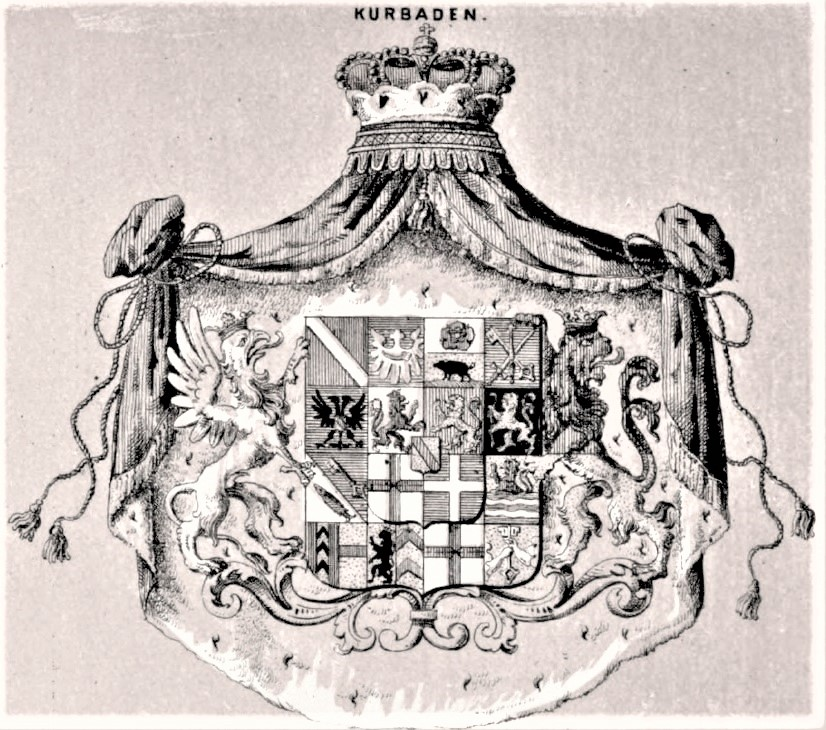
Short-lived Electorate of Baden 1803–1806

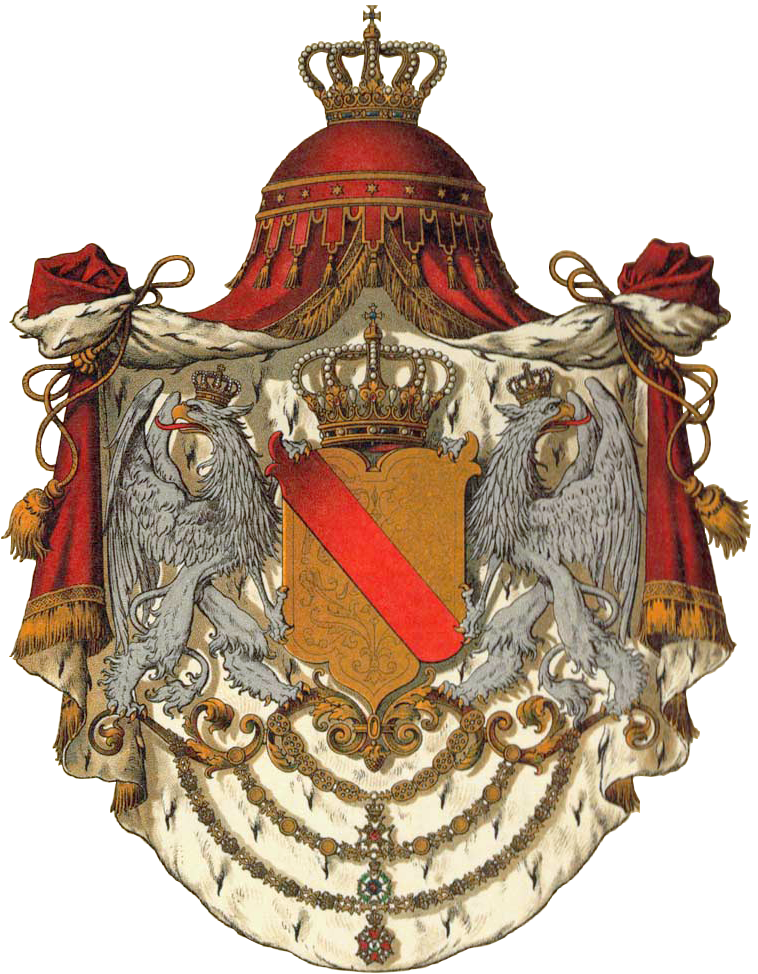
Grand Dukes of Baden 1877–1918

Republic of Baden 1918–1945

(South) Baden 1945–1952

Württemberg-Baden 1945–1952

Baden-Württemberg 1954–present

== See also ==
- Baden, for the pre-19th century state
- Baden-Württemberg, for the modern German federal state
- History of Baden
- Origin of the coats of arms of German federal states
- Grand Duchy of Baden, for the state that existed from 1808–1918
- Republic of Baden, for the state that existed from 1918–1945
- Rulers of Baden, for a list of sovereigns and presidents
- Coat of arms
- Heraldry
