= Herrenalb Abbey =

Coordinates: 48°47′46″N 8°26′13″E

Imperial Abbey of Herrenalb Reichskloster Herrenalb
- 1148–1497
- Coat of arms

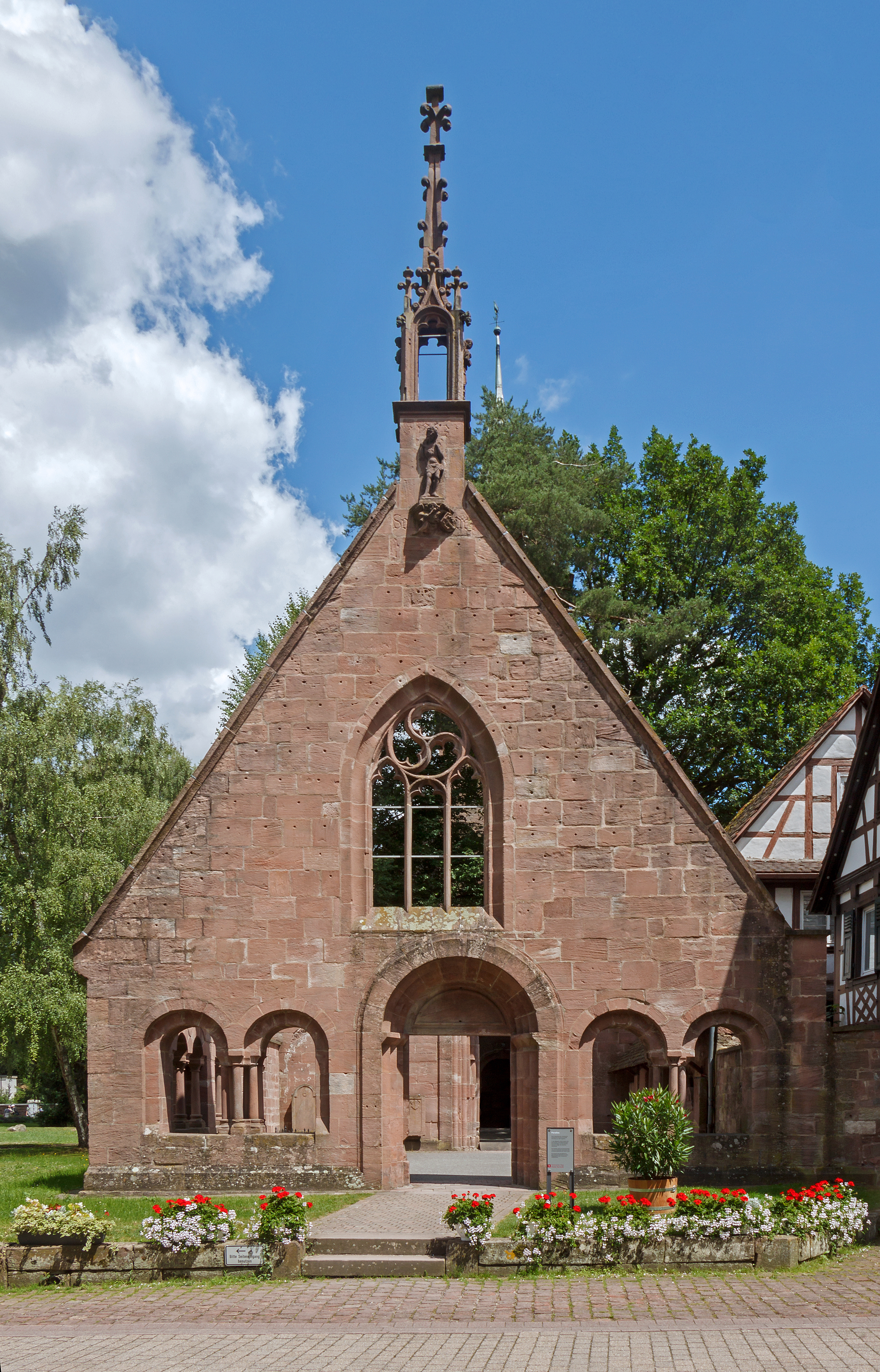
- Herrenalb Abbey: entrance porch of the ruined abbey church, ca 1900
- Status: Imperial Abbey
- Capital: Herrenalb Abbey
- Government: Theocracy
- Historical era: Middle Ages
  - Founded by Cty Eberstein: ca 1148
  - Gained Imperial immediacy: 1275
  - Under Vogtei of Mgvt Baden: 1289
  - Under Vogtei of the county of Württemberg: 1338
  - Divided between the Vögte: 1497
  - Abandoned after Ulrich introduced Reformation to Württemberg: 1536
Preceded by	Succeeded by
County of Eberstein	Margraviate of Baden; Duchy of Württemberg
- Today part of: Germany

Herrenalb Abbey (German: Kloster Herrenalb; Latin: Alba dominorum) is a former Cistercian monastery in the present Bad Herrenalb in Baden-Württemberg, Germany.

== History ==
The monastery was founded, probably in 1147 or 1148, by Count Berthold of Eberstein as a family monastery, although the foundation charter only survives in a corrupt copy of 1270. The new monastery was settled by monks from Neubourg Abbey in Alsace.

The Vogtei (advocacy or protective lordship) was the property of the founder and his family, but the abbey had the concession that within those limits it was able to choose which individual it wanted for the role. In 1289 the Margrave of Baden became Vogt and in 1338 the Count of Württemberg, who thenceforward retained the office despite continuing efforts of the Margraves of Baden.

The abbey owned scattered estates in the Alb valley in the northern Black Forest and round the communities of Ottersweier, Malsch (acquired 1318), Bruchsal, Oberderdingen, Vaihingen an der Enz and Merklingen (acquired 1296), among others. The abbey was however never able to concentrate its lands so as to maximise their economic potential, and never became particularly wealthy. The abbey at some stage received Reichsfreiheit as an Imperial abbey, but appears to have lost this status in 1497, with the abbey's territory being secularised to Württemberg, with Baden gaining some of the outlying villages.

It was laid waste in the German Peasants' War of 1525. After Duke Ulrich introduced the Reformation to Württemberg in 1534, the monks were forced to leave the abbey in 1536. A school was set up in the buildings in 1556 but was closed again in 1595.

Some buildings still remain of the original monastic complex, among them what appear to be the abbot's lodgings and the infirmary, besides ruins of the cloisters. The Romanesque tithe barn also still survives. Of the abbey church there are substantial remains of the Romanesque paradise (entrance porch). The Gothic choir was converted for use as a Lutheran church in 1739 and still contains many relics of its former use, including a monument to Bernard I, Margrave of Baden-Baden (died 1435, but not buried here). An impressive sculptured panel of the Crucifixion from the abbey was removed from Bad Herrenalb to Schloss Eberstein in the Murg valley in the 19th century.

== List of Rulers ==
Abbots Prior to Immediacy Loss

- Dietrich 1148
- Ulrich 1177
- Albrecht 1186
- Siger 1216
- Walther I 1227
- Eberhard I 1240
- Walther II 1256
- Konrad I von Eberstein 1262
- Matthias 1284
- Marquard I 1292
- Heinrich I 1313
- Rudger 1317
- Berthold 1326
- Eberhard II 1329
- Heinrich II 1335
- Ruprecht 1344
- Marquard II 1366
- Heinrich III 1400
- Konrad II 1406
- Heinrich IV von Magstatt 1427
- Johann I von Derdingen 1454
- Johann II von Horba 1466
- Johann III von Udenheim 1468
- Nikolaus von Obernrode 1471
- Bartholomeus von Richtenberg 1486

(1497 Imperial Immediacy revoked)

== References and external links ==
- Rückert, Peter; Schwarzmaier, Hansmartin: 850 Jahre Kloster Herrenalb. Stuttgart 2001, ISBN 3-7995-7819-6
- (in German) Herrenalb Abbey in the database of Abbeys of Baden-Württemberg in the State Archives of Baden-Württemberg
- (in German) Account of the abbey on the website of the Lutheran parish of Bad Herrenalb
- (in German) Abbey history on the website of the Roman Catholic parish of Bad Herrenalb
