= Coat of arms of Baden-Württemberg =

Coat of arms of the German state of Baden-Württemberg

Versions
- Lesser coat of arms
- Armiger: Government of Baden-Württemberg
- Adopted: 1954
- Crest: Six escutcheons of Franconia, Hohenzollern, Baden, Württemberg, Electorate of the Palatinate and Further Austria
- Shield: Or three lions passant sable pale, langued gules
- Supporters: Dexter a stag, sinister a griffin.
- Compartment: A pedestal sable and or
- Predecessor(s): Coat of arms of Württemberg-Baden, Coat of arms of Württemberg-Hohenzollern, Coat of arms of Baden
- Use: The great coat of arms is only used by higher authorities, i.e. the state premier, the government, the ministries, the state's representation to the Federation and to the EU, the Supreme State Court and higher courts, the audit court and the Administrative Districts.

The coat of arms of the German state of Baden-Württemberg features a greater and a lesser version.

== History ==
The coat of arms of Baden-Württemberg was determined after the merging of the former German states Baden, Württemberg-Baden and Württemberg-Hohenzollern, that were divided due to different occupying forces after World War II, in 1952. The creation of the state was not without controversies and thus only the state colours black and gold were determined in 1952, but not yet the arms. The latter were only regulated in the Gesetz über das Wappen des Landes Baden-Württemberg (Law on the Coat of Arms of Baden-Württemberg) of 3 May 1954. Its use is moreover regulated by an order dated 2 August 1954. It was designed by Fritz Reinhardt.

On base of article 24 clause 2 of the constitution, on April 28. 1954, the parliament has decided the following law, which is hereby proclaimed:

1. The coat of arms of the state of Baden-Württemberg shows in a golden shield three pacing black lions with red tongues. It is used as the greater and the smaller coat of arms.
2. In the greater coat of arms of the state, on the shield rests a crown with badges of the historical coats of arms of Baden, Württemberg, Hohenzollern, Palatinate, Franconia and Further Austria. The shield is held by a golden deer and a golden griffon, which are armored in red.
3. At the smaller coat of arms of the state, on the shield rests a crown of leaves (people's crown).

— The government of the state of Baden-Württemberg: Dr. Gebhard Müller Fr. Ulrich Simpfendörfer Dr. Frank Leibfried Hohlwegler Fiedler Farny Dichtel Dr. Werber, Law concerning the coat of arms of the state of Baden-Württemberg of May 3, 1954

The shield shows three black lions with red tongues on a golden background. The arms refer to the coat of arms of the Duke of Swabia whose House of Hohenstaufen had used these arms. The name of Suabia had long been discussed for use with the newly created state but it failed to be adopted due to resistance from parts of Baden.

Electoral Palatinate

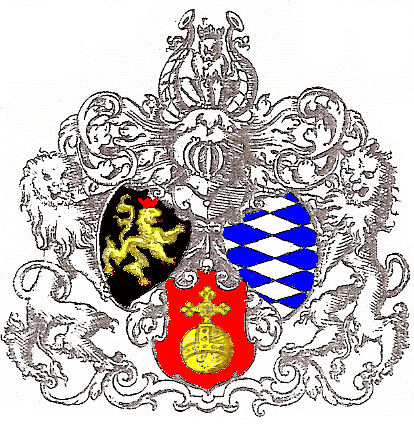
Electoral Palatinate 1703

County of Württemberg 1083–1495

Duchy of Württemberg 1495–1803

Electorate of Württemberg 1803–1806

Margraviate of Baden 1112–1806

Hohenzollern-Hechingen 1576–1850

Principality of Leyen 1806–1814

Grand Duchy of Baden 1877-1918

Kingdom of Württemberg 1805–1918

Province of Hohenzollern 1850–1946

Free People's State of Württemberg 1918–1945

Republic of Baden 1918–1945

South Baden 1947-1952

Württemberg-Hohenzollern 1945–1952

Württemberg-Baden 1945–1952

== Greater coat of arms ==
The six small coat of arms at the top stand for the origins of parts of Baden-Württemberg. They are from left to right:

- Coat of arms of Franconia for former Franconian regions in the northeast:

It shows the coat of arms of Franconia, called the Fränkischer Rechen (Franconian rake). This field represents Tauber Franconia, the region around the river Tauber in the northeastern part of Baden-Württemberg. It was part of the Duchy of Franconia. While the main part of Franconia became part of Bavaria, this area became separated and part of Baden-Württemberg. The coat of arms features a field divided per fess dancetty gules and argent, i.e. it is divided into an upper red band and a lower white band by a three-pointed zig-zag line. This was the coat of arms of the prince-bishops of Würzburg, who were also dukes of Franconia.

- Coat of arms of the House of Hohenzollern for the Province of Hohenzollern:

The second shield shows the coat of arms of the House of Hohenzollern (party per cross argent and sable). It represents a region north of lake Constance around Hohenzollern Castle, the ancestral seat of the House of Hohenzollern. The coat of arms of Hohenzollern is parted per cross; the first and third field are argent (white/silver), the second and fourth shield are sable (black).

- Coat of arms of Baden for Baden:

The third shield shows the coat of arms of Baden, a red diagonal band on a golden shield (or, a bend gules). This represents the former Margraviate and Grand Duchy of Baden, the western and south-western part of Baden-Württemberg. As one of the two biggest predecessors of Baden-Württemberg, also part of the state's name, this shield is about 10 percent bigger than the others.

- Coat of arms of Württemberg for Württemberg:

The fourth shield shows the coat of arms of Württemberg. On a golden shield, there are three superposed deer antlers. This shield represents the Region of Württemberg, the other main part of the state, which lies in the central and eastern part. For the same reasons, it is the same size as the coat of arms of Baden.

- Coat of arms of the Electorate of the Palatinate for the region around Mannheim and Heidelberg:

The fifth shield shows the coat of arms of the Elector Palatine. This field represents those parts of former Electorate of the Palatinate, on the right side of river Rhine. The black field is charged with a yellow lion rampant with red claws, tongue and crown (sable, a lion rampant or armed langued and crowned gules).

- Coat of arms of Austria for Further Austria in the south:

The sixth shield shows the coat of arms of Further Austria: a white horizontal band on a red field (gules, a fess argent). This shield represents the former possessions of the house of Habsburg, the family of the former Austrian Emperors.

Thereby the arms of Baden and Württemberg are slightly elevated. The supporters are a stag to the left representing Württemberg and a griffin to the right representing Baden. The supporters are those used in the arms of the pre-war states of Baden and Württemberg. They are positioned on a pedestal of black and gold which is not further mentioned in the law about the arms.

The great coat of arms is only used by higher authorities, i.e. the state premier, the government, the ministries, the state's representation to the Federation and to the EU, the Supreme State Court and higher courts, the audit court and the Administrative Districts.

== Lesser arms ==
The lesser coat of arms features the shield topped with crown-styled leaves that symbolises the people's sovereignty after the abolishment of monarchy in Germany. The lesser arms are used by all state authorities that do not employ the great coat of arms, as well as by those notaries that are civil servants.

== See also ==
- Origin of the coats of arms of German federal states.
