= Counts of Freiburg =

Coat of arms of the Counts of Freiburg from the Urach line

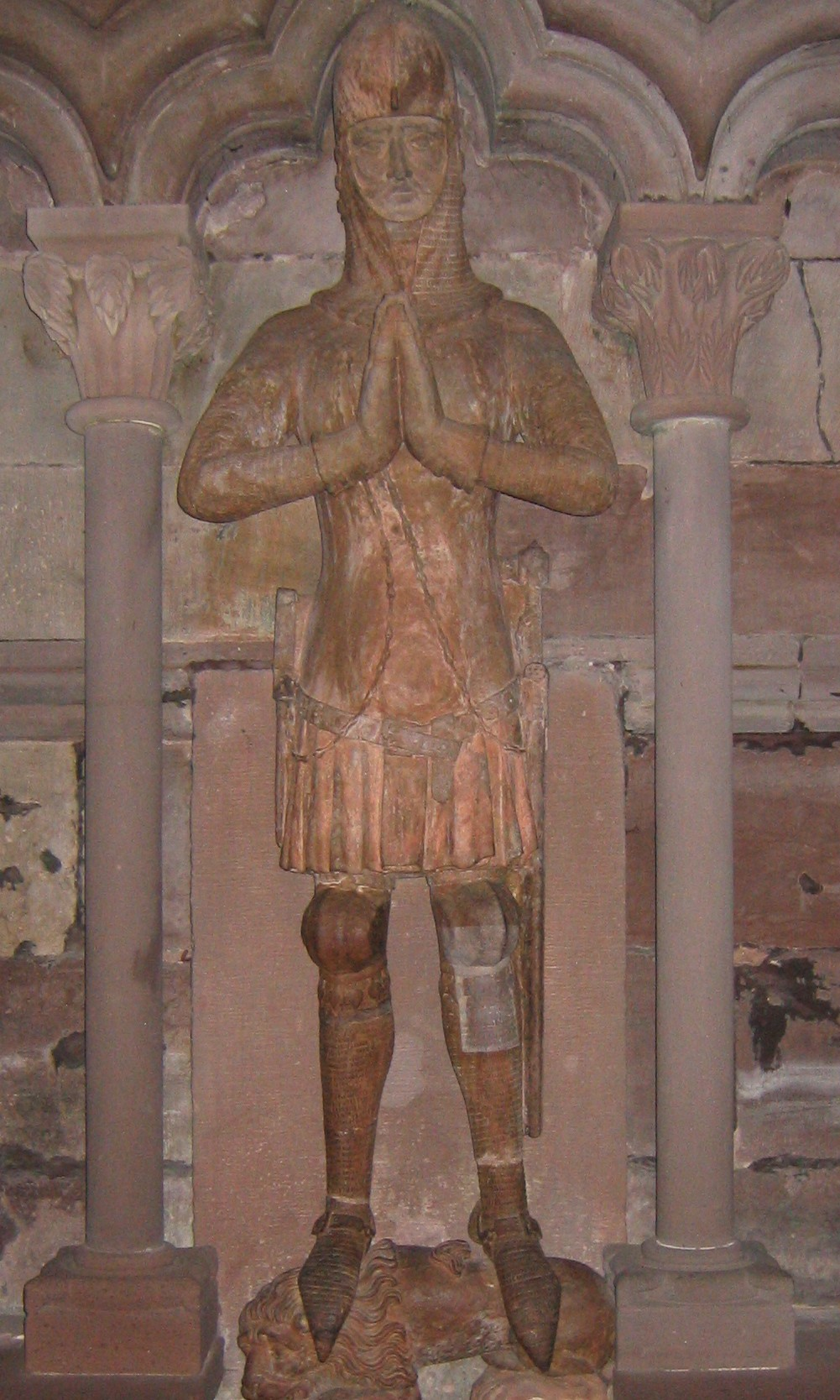
Probable tomb effigy of Friedrich, count of Freiburg (d. 1356).

The Counts of Freiburg were the descendants of Count Egino of Urach (d. 1236/7). They ruled over the city of Freiburg and the Breisgau (within the Margraviate of Baden) between approximately 1245 and 1368.

== History ==
The Margraviate of Baden had detached itself from the Duchy of Swabia in the 12th century under the House of Zähringen. The Zähringer were extinct in 1218, with the death of Berthold V, Duke of Zähringen, to the benefit of the House of Baden, represented by Herman V, Margrave of Baden-Baden (r. 1190–1243).

The Counts of Freiburg were the descendants of Count Egino of Urach (1168-1237) who was the son of Agnes of Zähringen and a potential heir to the Zähringer estates and fortunes. His son was Konrad I (1236-1272), under whose reign a division of the estate with the princely house of Fürstenberg took place, sometime before 1245.

In 1272 a son of Egino II's, Heinrich, received the southern territories, which included Badenweiler. By 1303, the counts from Heinrich's line had died out without leaving any male descendants. Their territory became the property of the Counts of Straßberg, who had married into their line. In 1385, under the rule of Konrad III, the property was given back to the descendants of the Counts of Freiburg. In 1368, the town Freiburg came under the dominion of the House of Habsburg.

Until 1368, this family of counts reigned over Freiburg, though their reign was never undisputed. In 1368, the city councillors of Freiburg ransomed themselves. The city of Freiburg, being the Habsburg territorial city in the Austrian Forelands, then acquired territory itself. It acquired the monastery St. Märgen in the Black Forest with its bailiwick, as well as the appertaining village principalities and properties.

After 1368, the Counts of Freiburg only reigned over their estates around Castle Neuenstein in Badenweiler located south of Freiburg. Johann, the last Count of Freiburg, bequeathed his estate, Badenweiler, to the sons of his nephew, the Margrave Wilhelm of Hachberg-Sausenberg, in 1444. His sons, Rudolf and Hugo, united the baronies, Rötteln, Sausenberg, and Badenweiler to form the Markgräflerland.

== List of counts of Freiburg ==
List shows reign, not lifespan.

- Egino I. (as Count of Urach Egino V.) (until 1236 or 1237)
- Konrad I. (1237–1271)
- Egino II. (1271–1316)
- Konrad II. (1316–1350)
- Friedrich (1350–1356)
- Klara (1356–1358)
- Egino III. (1358–1368)

Lords of Badenweiler:

- Konrad III. (1385–1424)
- Johann (1424–1444)

== See also ==
- Zähringer
