= Irmengard of the Rhine =

Margravine consort of Baden (d. 1260)

Countess Palatine Irmengard of the Rhine
- Born: c. 1200
- Died: 24 February 1260
- Noble family: House of Guelph
- Spouse: Herman V, Margrave of Baden-Baden
- Issue: Herman, Duke of Austria; Rudolf I, Margrave of Baden-Baden; Mechtild; Elisabeth
- Father: Henry V, Count Palatine of the Rhine
- Mother: Agnes of Hohenstaufen

Countess Palatine Irmengard of the Rhine, also known as Irmengard of Baden (c. 1200 – 24 February 1260) was Margravine of Baden by her marriage to Herman V, Margrave of Baden-Baden. She is known as the founder of the Lichtenthal Abbey, a Cistercian nunnery that has operated without interruption since 1245.

She brought the city of Pforzheim into the marriage. She was the daughter of Henry V, Count Palatine of the Rhine, who was also duke of Brunswick, and his wife Agnes of Hohenstaufen. Her paternal grandfather was Henry the Lion.

She and her husband are known as patrons of the monasteries in Maulbronn, Tennenbach, Herrenalb, Selz, Salem and Backnang Abbey. In 1245, Irmengard founded Lichtenthal Abbey in Lichtental (now part of Baden-Baden, where later the Margraves of Baden would be buried. However, the construction of this abbey exceeded her financial resources and she had to request assistance from her sons. In March 1245, she was given several manors and rights.

The brothers Herman and Rudolf, gave their mother Irmengard, who had begun the construction of a Cistercian monastery at Beuren, near Baden, for the salvation of her late husband, the Margrave of Baden, and for the reduction of her sins, but had insufficient means, the Jus patronatus of the churches in Ettlingen and Baden, the tithes in Iffezheim (deciman, que nobis cedit aqud Vffinshein), the villages of Winden and Beuren with all lands belonging thereto, two manors in Oos and one in Eberstein, and twelve pounds of coins from Strasbourg from their interest in Selz

— General State Archive in Karlsruhe

In this case, the brothers gave away more than they owned, because they had earlier enfeoffed Louis of Liebenzell with two parts of the tithes. This led to a lengthy dispute.

== Marriage and issue ==
Around 1217, Irmengard married Herman V, Margrave of Baden-Baden. They had the following children:

- Herman VI (1225 – 4 October 1250), Margrave of Baden
- Rudolf I (1230 – 19 November 1288), Margrave of Baden
- Mechtild (died 1258) married on April 4, 1251 to Ulrich I, Count of Württemberg (c. 1222 – 25 February 1265)
- Elisabeth, who married firstly Count Eberhard of Eberstein, and secondly Louis II of Lichtenberg

In 1248, Irmengard transferred her husband's body from Backnang Abbey to Lichtenthal Abbey.
