= Bertha of Tübingen =

Margravine of Baden and Verona

Bertha of Tübingen (c. 1140 – 24 February 1169) was a Margravine of Baden and Verona, as the wife of Herman IV, Margrave of Baden. She was the mother of Herman V, Margrave of Baden-Baden and Henry I, Margrave of Baden-Hachberg. She was the daughter of Ludwig, Count Palatine of Tübingen.
