= Henry I of Baden-Hachberg =

Margrave of Baden-Hachberg

Henry I, Margrave of Baden-Hachberg
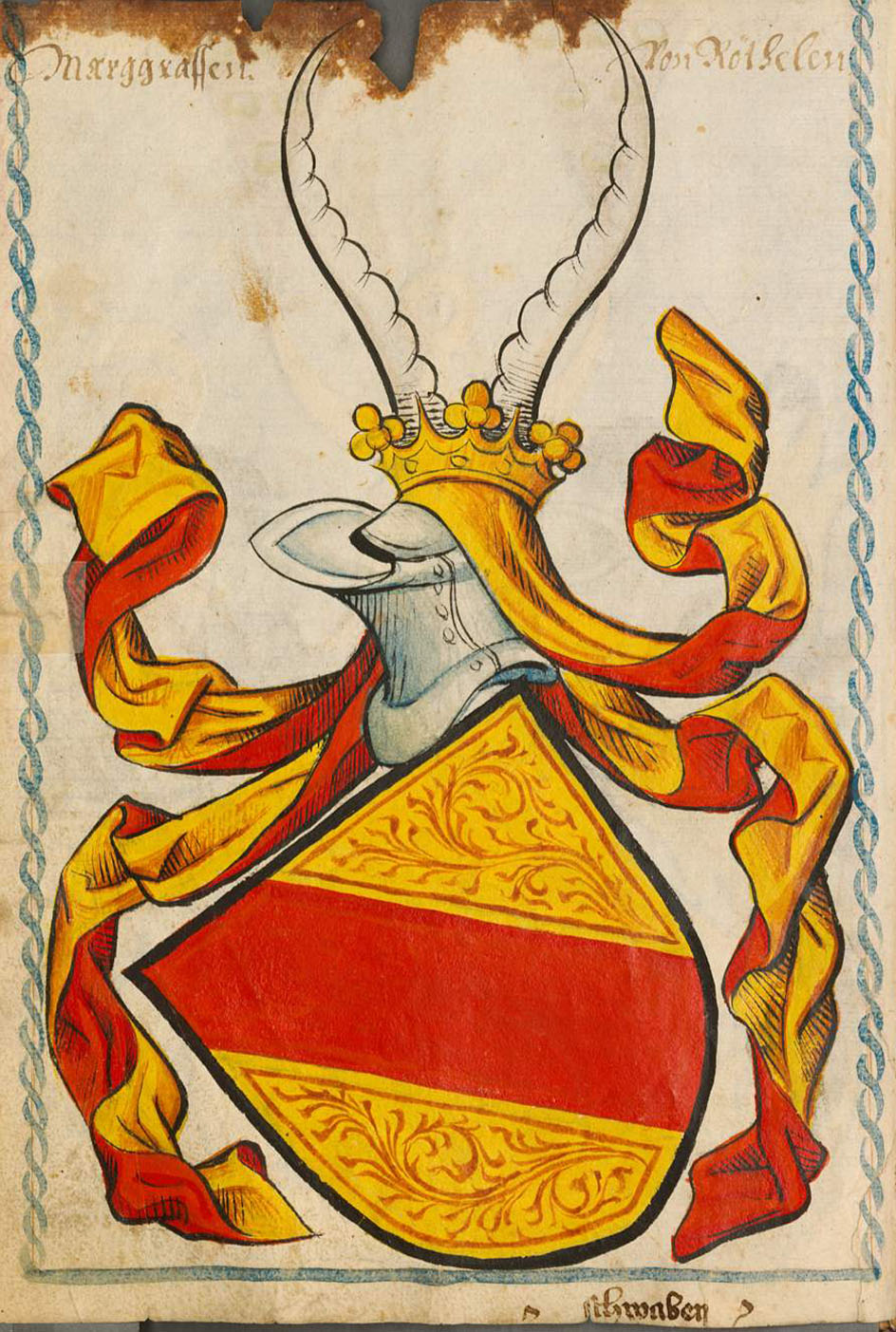
- Coat-of-arms of Baden-Hachberg

Margraviate of Baden-Hachberg
- Reign: 1190 – 1231
- Born: after 1180
- Died: 2 July 1231
- Noble family: House of Zähringen
- Spouse: Agnes of Urach
- Issue: Henry II; Herman
- Father: Hermann IV
- Mother: Bertha of Tübingen

Henry I, German: Heinrich I (after 1180 – 2 July 1231) from the House of Zähringen was margrave of Baden-Hachberg. He was the founder of the Baden-Hachenberg branch.

== Life ==
He was the second son of Herman IV, Margrave of Baden and Bertha of Tübingen, daughter of Ludwig, Count Palatine of Tübingen. His elder brother was Herman V, Margrave of Baden-Baden (born c. 1180). Younger siblings were Friedrich (c. 1187 - 1217), Jutta and Bertha.

His father joined Frederick I in his Italian campaigns and in the Third Crusade. He travelled through Asia Minor to Antioch, where he died in camp from disease in 1190. Herman V succeeded him in Baden-Baden, while Henry I received Baden-Hachberg. Herman V followed Frederick II in Italy, in Egypt (where he went into captivity), and in the Fifth and Sixth Crusade.

Henry I was the first in his line of the House of Zähringen to style himself Margrave of Hachberg. He died in 1231 and succeeded by his son Henry II who was a minor at the time. Henry II initially stood under the guardianship of his mother. In 1232, he purchased the Lordship of Sausenburg from St. Blaise Abbey and soon afterwards, he built Sausenburg Castle, which was first mentioned in 1246.

== Family ==
He married Agnes of Urach, daughter of Egino IV, Count of Urach, and had issue:

- Henry II, Margrave of Baden-Hachberg & Sausenberg (before 1231-c.1297/98), married to Anne of Üsingen-Ketzingen.
- Hermann, margrave of Hachberg (ruled 1232–1239).

== Sources ==
- Johann Christian Sachs (1764), Einleitung in die Geschichte der Marggravschaft und des marggrävlichen altfürstlichen Hauses Baden, vol. 1, Frankfurt and Leipzig, pp. 398–414, Online at Google Books
- genealogie-mittelalter.de (in German)
- (in German) Worldroots

== Footnotes ==
Henry I of Baden-Hachberg House of Zähringen Born: c. 1180 Died: c. 1231
Preceded by new creation	Margrave of Baden-Hachberg; 1190-1231	Succeeded by Henry II
