= Bernard I of Baden-Baden =

Bernard I of Baden
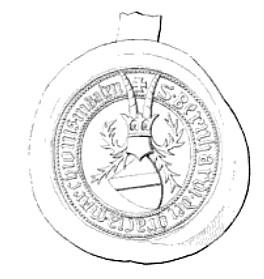
- Seal (sigillum) of Bernard I.
- Born: 1364
- Died: 5 April 1431; Baden
- Noble family: House of Zähringen
- Spouses: Margarete of Hohenberg (m. 1384 – div. 1391); Anna of Oettingen (m. 1398 – his death)
- Issue: Anna; Beatrix; Matilde; Margarete; Jacob; Agnes; Ursula; Bernard; Brigitte; Rudolph: illegitimate Bernhard Anna
- Father: Rudolf VI, Margrave of Baden-Baden
- Mother: Matilda of Sponheim

Bernard I of Baden (1364 – 5 April 1431, Baden) was Margrave of the Margraviate of Baden from 1391 to 1431.

== Life ==
He was the elder son of Rudolf VI and Matilda of Sponheim. He and his brother Rudolf VII concluded an inheritance contract in 1380, according to which the margraviate might be divided only among male descendants for two generations. Rudolf VII afterwards received the southern areas from Ettlingen via Rastatt to Baden-Baden, Bernard himself the areas around Durlach and Pforzheim.

He had his family seat in the fortress of Hohenbaden high above the thermal baths of the town of Baden. During his reign he extended the castle from the underlying Gothic structure. On 25 July 1415 for 80000 Rhenish guilders, he purchased Hachberg, Höhingen, Ober-Usenberg and the town of Sulzburg in Upper Baden from Otto II, the last margrave of the eponymous collateral line. During this time he had many disputes with the towns of Strasbourg, Speyer and with king Ruprecht I. His successor Jacob I further expanded the castle into a fortress.

== Family and children ==
On 22 June 1368, Bernard I was betrothed to Margarete of Hohenberg, the only daughter and heiress of Count Rudolph III of Hohenberg. The formal marriage took place sixteen years later, on 1 September 1384. They had no children and finally divorced in 1391.

On 15 September 1397, a Papal dispensation was granted to Bernard I and Anna, daughter of Count Louis XI of Oettingen, because they were related in the prohibited 4th degree of consanguinity. The marriage took place on 27 March 1398, and the dispensation was renewed some months later, on 27 August. They had ten children:

1. Anna (15 March 1399 – after 6 December 1421), married 11 May 1409 Louis IV of Lichtenberg.
2. Beatrix (24 June 1400 – 1452), married 11 July 1411 Count Emich VI of Leiningen-Hartenburg.
3. Matilde (11 December 1401 – 18 April 1402).
4. Margarete (25 January 1404 – 7 November 1442), married 1 March 1418 Count Adolph II of Nassau-Wiesbaden-Idstein.
5. Jacob (15 March 1407, Hachberg – 13 October 1453, Mühlburg), Margrave of Baden-Baden.
6. Agnes (25 March 1408 – January 1473, Ebersteinburg), married firstly 2 June 1432 Count Gerhard VII of Holstein-Rendsburg and secondly (secretly on 2 June 1436) Hans von Löwen.
7. Ursula (24 October 1409 – 24 March 1429), married firstly 20 December 1422 Count Gottfried IX of Ziegenhain and secondly 16 April 1426 Duke [Ulrich II of Teck.
8. Bernard (31 October 1412 – 27 July 1424).
9. Brigitte (1 January 1416 – after 24 July 1441), a nun.
10. Rudolph (13 July 1417 – August 1424).

He also had two illegitimate children:

- Bernhard, Priest at Besigheim (between 1422 and 1439) and Canon at Basel Cathedral in 1439.
- Anna (d. before 12 May 1449), married before 1439 Paul Lutran von Ertrin, Vogt of Pforzheim in 1453.

== See also ==
- List of rulers of Baden

This article is translated from the German Wikipedia

Bernard I of Baden-Baden House of Zähringen Born: 1364 Died: 5 April 1431
Preceded by Rudolf VI	Margrave of Baden-Pforzheim; 1372–1431	Succeeded by Jacob I
Preceded by Rudolf VII	Margrave of Baden-Baden; 1391–1431	Succeeded by Jacob I
Preceded by Otto II	Margrave of Baden-Hachberg; 1415–1431	Succeeded by Jacob I
