= Herman IV of Baden =

Margrave of Baden (1160-1190)

Margraviate of Baden
- Reign: 1160 – 1190
- Born: 1135
- Died: 13 September 1190
- Noble family: House of Zähringen
- Spouse: Bertha of Tübingen
- Issue: Hermann V Heinrich I Friedrich; Jutta; Bertha
- Father: Hermann III
- Mother: Bertha of Lorraine

Hermann IV of Baden (1135 – September 13, 1190) was titular Margrave of Verona and Margrave of Baden from 1160.

He was the son of Hermann III and Bertha of Lorraine, daughter of Simon I of Lorraine. Around 1162 he was married to Bertha (died February 24, 1169), the daughter of Count Palatine Ludwig of Tübingen.

Together with Emperor Frederick I, Hermann took part in the siege and destruction of Milan. From 1176 to 1178 he was a member of Frederick's Italian campaign, and was a participant in the battle of Legnano in 1176. Hermann was a guarantor in the peace of Constance in 1183, in which the cities of Lombardy became independent.

Hermann fought under the Emperor during the Third Crusade, traversing Anatolia en route to the Siege of Acre. Frederick's death in June of 1190 caused thousands of German soldiers to leave the force and return home through the Cilician and Syrian ports. The joint German-Hungarian army continued southward but was struck with disease near Antioch, weakening it further. Hermann died in camp on 13 Sep 1190. Only a remnant of the original army arrived at the siege.

== Children ==
- Hermann V, Margrave of Baden (died January 16, 1243)
- Heinrich I, Margrave of Baden-Sausenberg and later Baden-Hachberg (died July 2, 1231). He married Agnes
- Friedrich (1161–1217) Regent
- Jutta
- Bertha

Preceded by Hermann III of Baden	Margrave of Baden; 1160–1190	Succeeded by Hermann V of Baden
