= Herman I of Baden =

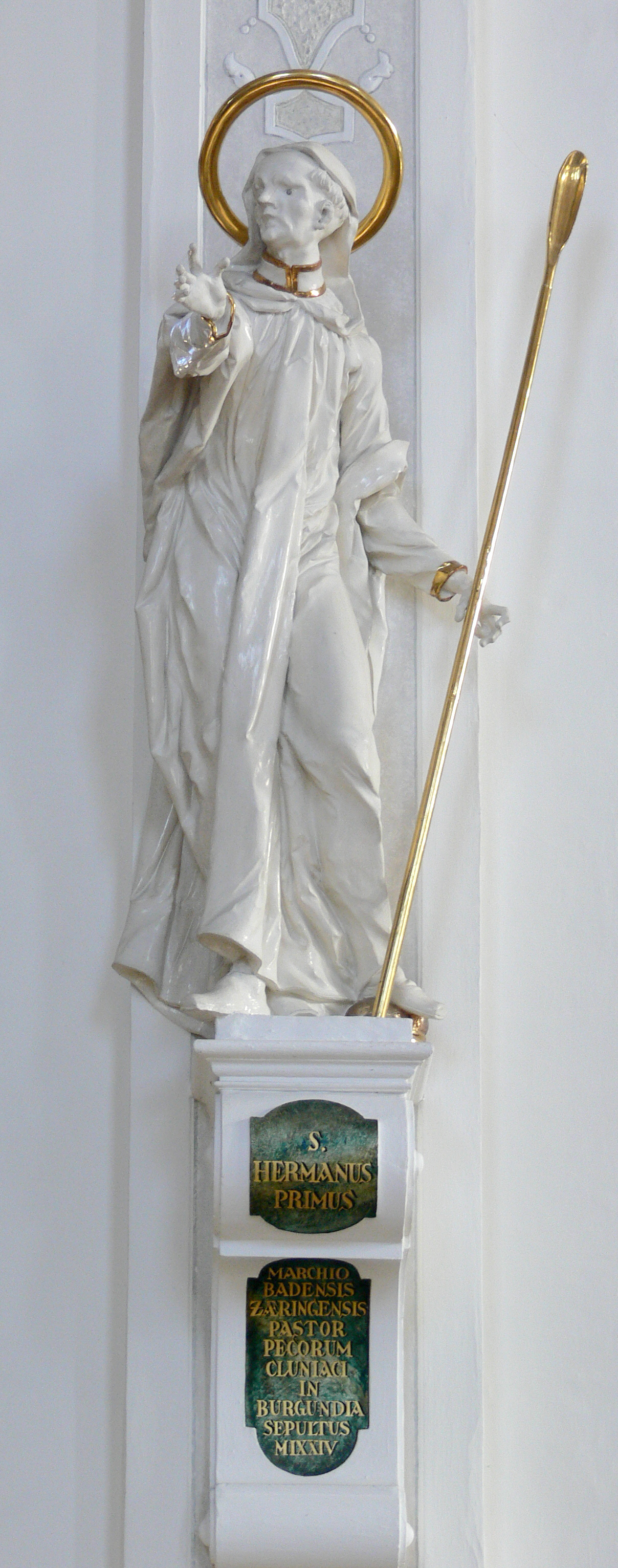
Commemorative statue of Herman at the Abbey of Saint Peter in the Black Forest

Herman I of Baden (c. 1040 – April 25, 1074 in Cluny) was the titular Margrave of Verona and the agnatic ancestor of the Margraves of Baden.

== Life and family ==
Herman was born in Freiburg im Breisgau as the eldest son of Berthold I of Zähringen. When the latter became Duke of Carinthia in 1061, Herman received the courtesy title of Margrave of Verona. Although he never ruled in Verona, a dependency of Carinthia, the margravial title was to remain with his descendants. He was also Count of the Breisgau.

In 1073, Herman separated from his wife Judith, took monastic vows and became a lay brother at Cluny Abbey, where he died in 1074. He is celebrated in the Catholic Church on April 25.

Herman and his wife had the following children:

- Herman II
- Luitgard

== Sources ==
- Oexle, Otto Gerhard. "Hermann I." Deutsche Biographie (in German). Neue Deutsche Biographie (NDB).
