= Herman V of Baden-Baden =

Margrave of Baden (d. 1243)

Herman V, Margrave of Baden
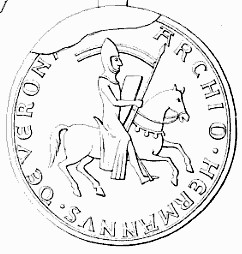
- Seal (sigillum) of Herman V.
- Born: 1180
- Died: 17 January 1243
- Noble family: House of Zähringen
- Spouse: Countess Palatine Irmengard of the Rhine
- Issue: Herman VI, Margrave of Baden; Rudolf I, Margrave of Baden-Baden; Mechtild; Elisabeth
- Father: Herman IV, Margrave of Baden
- Mother: Bertha of Tübingen

Herman V, Margrave of Baden (c. 1180 – 17 January 1243) ruled Verona and Baden from 1190 until his death.

He was the son of Herman IV and his wife Bertha of Tübingen. He married in 1217 to Irmengard, Countess Palatine by the Rhine (born 1200, died February 25, 1260); their marriage lasted until Herman V's death.

In the German throne dispute of 1198, Hermann was on the side of King Philip, and from 1208–1211 on the side of Emperor Otto IV. He was a devout follower of Emperor Frederick II. Hermann also founded the cities of Backnang, Pforzheim, and Stuttgart. In 1219 Pforzheim became the seat of power for the Margravate of Baden.

In 1218 he abandoned claims to titles in Zähringen, and in 1227 gave up claims in Braunschweig as well. Herman was then made Count of Ortenau and Breisgau. In the entourage of Emperor Frederick II, he traveled through much of Germany and Italy, and in 1221 went into captivity in Egypt. He took part in the Fifth Crusade and the Sixth Crusade in 1228 with Frederick II and his brother. The Margrave counselled Henry VII until he was thrown out. Hermann also took part in the defensive struggle against the Mongols at Liegnitz.

He founded or supported several important monasteries: Maulbronn Abbey, Tennenbach Abbey, Herrenalb Abbey, Selz Abbey, Salem Abbey and Backnang Abbey. His wife Irmengard founded Lichtenthal Abbey in Baden-Baden in 1245, which later became the burial place of the margraves.

Hermann was buried in Backnang, until his widow reinterred his remains at Lichtenthal in 1248.

== Family ==
The Margrave and his wife had the following children:

- Herman VI (born 1225, died October 4, 1250)
- Rudolf I (born 1230, died November 19, 1288)
- Mechtild (died 1258) married on April 4, 1251 to Ulrich I, Count of Württemberg (born in 1222, died on February 25, 1265)
- Elisabeth, who married firstly Count Eberhard of Eberstein, and secondly Ludwig II of Lichtenberg.

Herman V of Baden-Baden House of Zähringen Died: 16 January 1243
Preceded by Herman IV of Baden	Margrave of Baden; 1190–1243	Succeeded by Herman VI
