= Breisgau =

Area in southwest Germany

Coordinates: 47°56′N 7°49′E

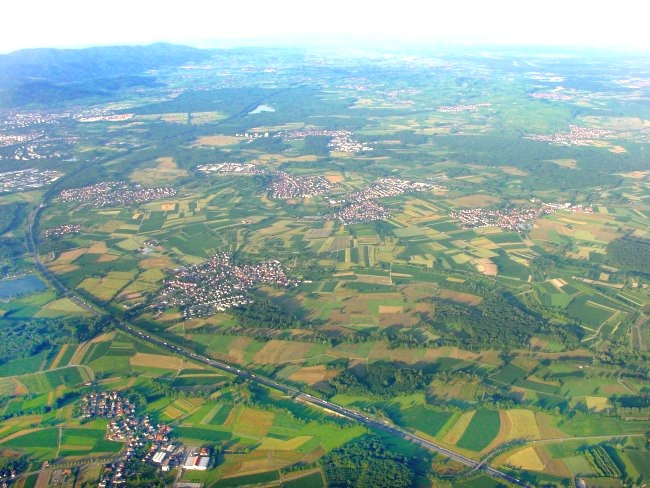
Aerial view of the Breisgau

The Breisgau (German pronunciation: [ˈbʁaɪsɡaʊ]) is an area in southwest Germany extending along the Rhine River and enveloping portions of the Black Forest. Part of the state of Baden-Württemberg, it centers on the city of Freiburg im Breisgau. The district of Breisgau-Hochschwarzwald, which partly consists of the Breisgau, is named after the Black Forest area. Parts of the Breisgau are also situated in the political districts of Freiburg im Breisgau and Emmendingen.

== History ==
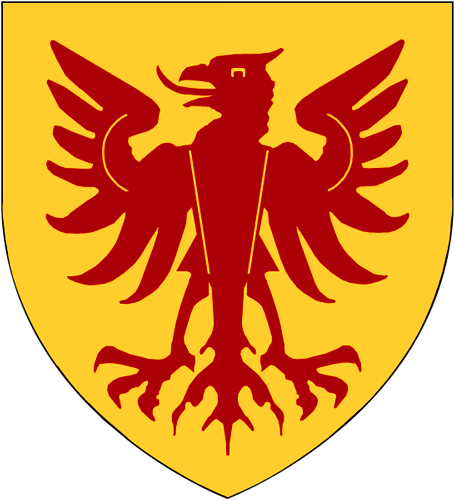
Arms of the House of Zähringen

The earliest historically attested inhabitants were Celts. In Roman times, the area was part of the province of Germania Superior, but after the rupture of the limes Germanicus in 260, the area was settled by the Alemanni. It remained a part of Alemannia throughout the Early Middle Ages and was a buffer zone between the central Alemannic lands and Alsace, which was less strongly colonized by the Alemanni.

The name of the region goes back to Carolingian times, when most of modern Germany was divided into Gaue, territorial divisions similar to shires or counties. The Breisgau was then known as Breisachgau, meaning the Gau around the town of Breisach on the east bank of the Rhine. In the mid-9th century, it was a march-like territory guarding the frontier with southern Lotharingia and Alsace. In 859, it was bestowed on Charles the Fat, the son of King Louis I, a sign of its importance.

In the 10th century, the Breisgau was within the Duchy of Swabia and ruled by the Zähringen family. In 1092 the Zähringer Berthold II claimed the Swabian ducal title but had to relinquish it to the Staufer Frederick I in 1098; Berthold and his heirs would instead be known as the Dukes of Zähringen. In the Breisgau, the dukes of Zähringen founded Freiburg, which became their chief city. In 1218 the ducal Zähringen line died out and the Breisgau passed to the House of Baden, another Zähringer line (descended from Berthold II's brother Herman) who had also detached themselves from Swabia in the 12th century as the Margraviate of Baden. Within Baden Freiburg was ruled by the Counts of Freiburg from the mid-13th century until 1368.

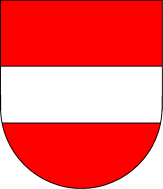
Arms of Further Austria (Vorderösterreich)

From the 13th/14th century, the area was part of Further Austria (the Vorlande), the area in southwest Germany ruled by the Austrian Habsburgs. In 1797 the Breisgau, along with the rest of the Vorlande, was ceded to Ercole III d'Este, Duke of Modena and Reggio, as compensation for his losses to the French Cispadane Republic (Cisalpine Republic from 1797); it passed to his heir Ferdinand Karl of Austria-Este following his death in 1803. In 1805, by the Treaty of Pressburg, the area was ceded to the Electorate of Baden (the Grand Duchy of Baden from 1806).

== Borders and area ==
The Breisgau includes the flat area around river Rhine, the foothills of the Black Forest and the western faces of the southern Black Forest mountains and the Kaiserstuhl hills.

In the south, the Breisgau borders onto the Markgräflerland, in the west onto the Sundgau (Alsace, France), in the east onto the Black Forest, and in the north onto the Ortenau area.

== Climate ==
The climate of the Breisgau is warm; in fact, it is the warmest region in Germany. The average annual temperature is 11 degrees Celsius (52 degrees Fahrenheit), the average rainfall is 900 mm (36").

== Agriculture ==
The Breisgau is known for its wine and used for fruit tree orchards and grain.

== Places in the Breisgau ==
The biggest city by far in the Breisgau region is Freiburg. Other notable cities and towns are Bad Krozingen, Breisach, Emmendingen, Endingen, Kenzingen, Neuenburg, Staufen and Waldkirch.

A prominent mountain is the Schauinsland (1,284 m).
