= Margraviate of Baden =

Border state of the Holy Roman Empire (1112–1803)

Margraviate of Baden Markgrafschaft Baden (German)
- 1112–1803
- Flag Coat of arms

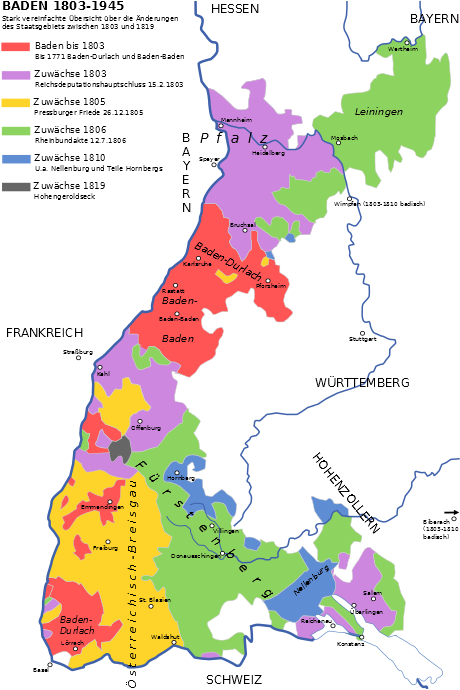
- In red, the Margraviate in 1801; later gains as Grand Duchy in other colours
- Status: Margraviate
- Capital: Baden-Baden (12th century); Karlsruhe (1715–1803)
- Government: Feudal monarchy
- Margrave of Baden
  - 1112–1130: Herman II
  - 1250–1268: Frederick I
  - 1453–1458: Bernard II
  - 1475–1515: Christopher I
  - 1771–1803: Charles Frederick
- History
  - Margraviate est.: 1112
  - Territory partitioned ^{b}: 1190–1771
  - Elevated to Electorate: 1803

Population
  - 1794: 195,000
Preceded by	Succeeded by
Duchy of Swabia	Electorate of Baden
- Today part of: Germany
- a: Charles Frederick was the Margrave of Baden-Durlach until 1771, when he inherited Baden-Baden and became the margrave of unified Baden. In 1803, his support of Napoleon rewarded him with the rank of prince-elector. In 1806, he was raised to the rank of Grand Duke, when he joined the Confederation of the Rhine. b: Baden was partitioned in the years between 1190–1503, 1515–1620 and 1622–1771.

The Margraviate of Baden (German: Markgrafschaft Baden) was a historical territory of the Holy Roman Empire. Spread along the right banks of the Upper Rhine in south-western Germany, it was named a margraviate in 1112 and existed until 1535, when it was split into the two margraviates of Baden-Durlach and Baden-Baden. The two parts were reunited in 1771 under Margrave Charles Frederick, even if the three parts of the state maintained their distinct seats to the Reichstag. The restored Margraviate of Baden was elevated to the status of electorate in 1803. In 1806, the Electorate of Baden, receiving territorial additions, became the Grand Duchy of Baden. The rulers of Baden, known as the House of Baden, were a line of the Swabian House of Zähringen.

== History ==
During the 11th century, the Duchy of Swabia lacked a powerful central authority and was under the control of various comital dynasties, the strongest of them being the House of Hohenstaufen, the House of Welf, the Habsburgs and the House of Zähringen. Emperor Henry III had promised the ducal throne to the Zähringen scion Berthold, however, upon Henry's death in 1056 his widow Agnes of Poitou appointed Rudolf of Rheinfelden Duke of Swabia. Berthold renounced his rights and was compensated with the Duchy of Carinthia and the March of Verona in Italy. Not able to establish himself, he finally lost both territories, when he was deposed by King Henry IV of Germany during the Investiture Controversy in 1077. Berthold retired to his Swabian home territory, where he died the next year. The Veronese margravial title was nevertheless retained by his eldest son Herman I

Herman II, son of Herman I and grandson of Berthold II, had concluded an agreement with the rivalling Hohenstaufen dynasty, and about 1098 was enfeoffed with immediate territory by Emperor Henry IV. Like his father, Herman II insisted on his margravial title. He chose to establish his residence in Germany, as he had been born and raised there. His lordship of choice was Baden (present-day Baden-Baden), where his father had gained the right to rule by marrying the heiress, Judit von Backnang-Sulichgau, Countess of Eberstein-Calw. In Baden, Herman II had Hohenbaden Castle built. Construction began about 1100, and when completed in 1112, he marked the occasion by adopting the title of a Margrave of Baden.

=== Growth ===
Because Baden was the capital, the new margraviate was also known as Baden. Herman II would continue to be margrave until his death in 1130. His son and grandson, Hermann III (reigned 1130–1160) and Herman IV (reigned 1160–1190), added to their territories. Around 1200, these lands were divided for the first time. Two lines, Baden-Baden and Baden-Hochberg, were founded. The latter was divided about a hundred years later to create the third line – Baden-Sausenberg.

In the 12th and 13th centuries Baden was a loyal and steadfast supporter of the House of Hohenstaufen, even against its own relatives from Zähringen-Swabia. In return for its services, it was permitted to spread its rule throughout southwestern Germany, west across the Rhine river into Alsace, east to the edges of the Black Forest, north to the Murg river and south to the Breisgau. The fourth margrave of Baden-Baden, Herman V, Margrave of Baden-Baden (reigned 1190–1243), founded the cities of Backnang, Durlach, Stuttgart, Ettlingen, and Pforzheim and several monasteries, including the Lichtenthal Abbey, which became the burial place of his descendants. In 1219 he moved his seat of power to Pforzheim. He had to abandon his claims to Zähringen and Braunschweig, but he gained the title of Graf [Count] von Ortenau and Breisgau, named for the two valleys in southern Baden. His son and grandson, Herman VI, Margrave of Baden (reigned 1243–1250) and Frederick I, Margrave of Baden (reigned 1250–1268), claimed the ducal titles of Austria and Styria. The Austrians rejected them as they did not want to be ruled by outsiders.

=== Consolidation ===
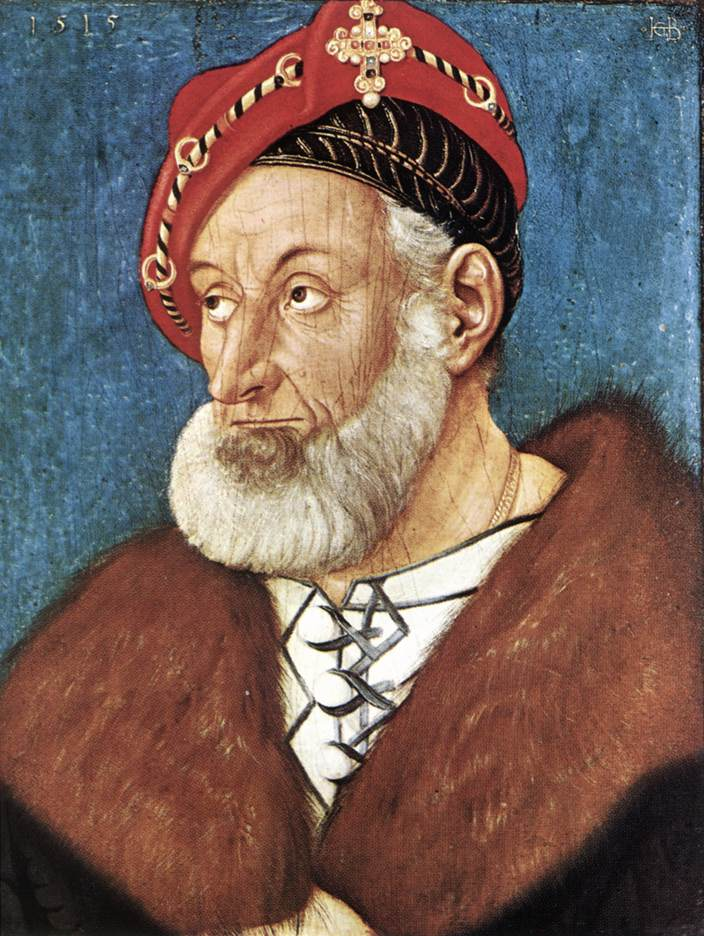
Christopher I of Baden, by Hans Baldung Grien, 1515

Bernard I, Margrave of Baden-Baden (reigned 1391–1431) united all of the acquisitions in 1391. A soldier of some renown, Bernard continued the mission of his predecessors, and gained several more districts, including Baden-Pforzheim and Baden-Hochberg. Since 1291, Baden-Pforzheim had its own margraviate, but in 1361 it ran out of heirs, falling back to the House of Baden-Baden. Baden-Hochberg fared little better. Founded in 1190, it lasted until 1418, when it too died with no male heirs. Bernard, being the closest heir, claimed Baden-Hochberg. Baden-Sausenberg continued its own margraviate until 1503, when the lack of its own heirs sent it back to the House of Baden-Baden.

The consolidation of the margraviate came in 1442. In that year, one-half of the dominions of Lahr and Mahlberg was brought into the fold, creating the link between the two main areas, the Breisgau in the south and Baden-Baden in the north. Throughout the Late Middle Ages, Baden grew its administration, finances and armies until it became one of the biggest and strongest states of the Holy Roman Empire in southwestern Germany, especially after it gained the Habsburg possessions in the rest of the Ortenau and the Breisgau.

=== Tribulations ===
In 1462 the dispute over the election of the new Archbishop of Mainz sent Charles I (reigned 1453–1475) to fight the war against Frederick I, Elector Palatine. Known as the "Mainz Archbishops' Feud", it was brief, lasting only a few months, but the effects were ruinous for the loser – Charles. He had to surrender several of his territories to the Electoral Palatinate and its allies. These territories were recovered by his son and successor, Christoph I (reigned 1475–1515). He tried to keep them united under one of his sons, Philip, but his efforts were foiled by the king of France, Louis XII. In 1479, the seat of the Margraviate of Baden was moved from Hohenbaden Castle to New Castle (Neues Schloss) of Baden-Baden, built by Christoph I. In 1503, the Baden-Sausenberg died without male heirs and all the Badener lands were united by Christoph himself. Before his death, Christoph divided the margraviate between his three sons. Philip succeeded him in 1515 but died childless in 1533, and his share went to his brothers, Bernard and Ernest. In 1535, they made a fresh division of their inheritance. It would be the first of several partitions, establishing the two main lines of the House of Baden – Baden-Baden and Baden-Durlach (Baden-Pforzheim until 1565) – which would last until 1771. However, the relations between the two lines were not peaceful and the constant partitioning did not help.

During the Reformation, several branches, led by Baden-Baden, remained on the side of the Catholics, the others joining with Baden-Durlach on the Protestant side. The Thirty Years' War made matters worse for all the branches. Many of them were exiled to other countries. Baden suffered severely during the war. The 1648 Treaty of Westphalia restored the branches and their churches to their own lands. Gradually the rivalry subsided. During the wars of Louis XIV, the "Sun King" of France, the two margraviates were ravaged by the French troops. The forces of the Holy Roman Empire, led by the Margrave of Baden-Baden, "Turkish Louis" William (reigned 1677–1707) fought against France.

=== Reunification ===
In 1771, Augustus George became the last Margrave of Baden-Baden when he died without sons. All his territories passed to his 6th cousin twice removed and nearest heir – the Margrave of Baden-Durlach, Charles Frederick (reigned 1738–1811). For the third and last time, all the Badener lands became united under a single ruler.

Although Baden was finally united, its domains were fragmented and widespread on both sides of the Upper Rhine river, with the total area of 1,350 sq mi (3,500 km^{2}). When Charles Frederick became the margrave in 1738, he made it his personal mission to fill the gaps in his territories. His first opportunity came in 1792, when the War of the First Coalition broke out between France and Austria. The Badeners fought for Austria, leaving Baden devastated when they lost. Charles Frederick had to pay an indemnity and cede his territories on the left bank of the Rhine to France. He had his second chance a few years later, as an enemy of Napoleon, on the side of Alexander I of Russia. In 1803, because of the efforts of the tsar, the margrave gained the Prince-Bishopric of Constance, parts of the Rhenish Palatinate, and several other smaller districts, thereby gaining the dignity of a prince-elector.

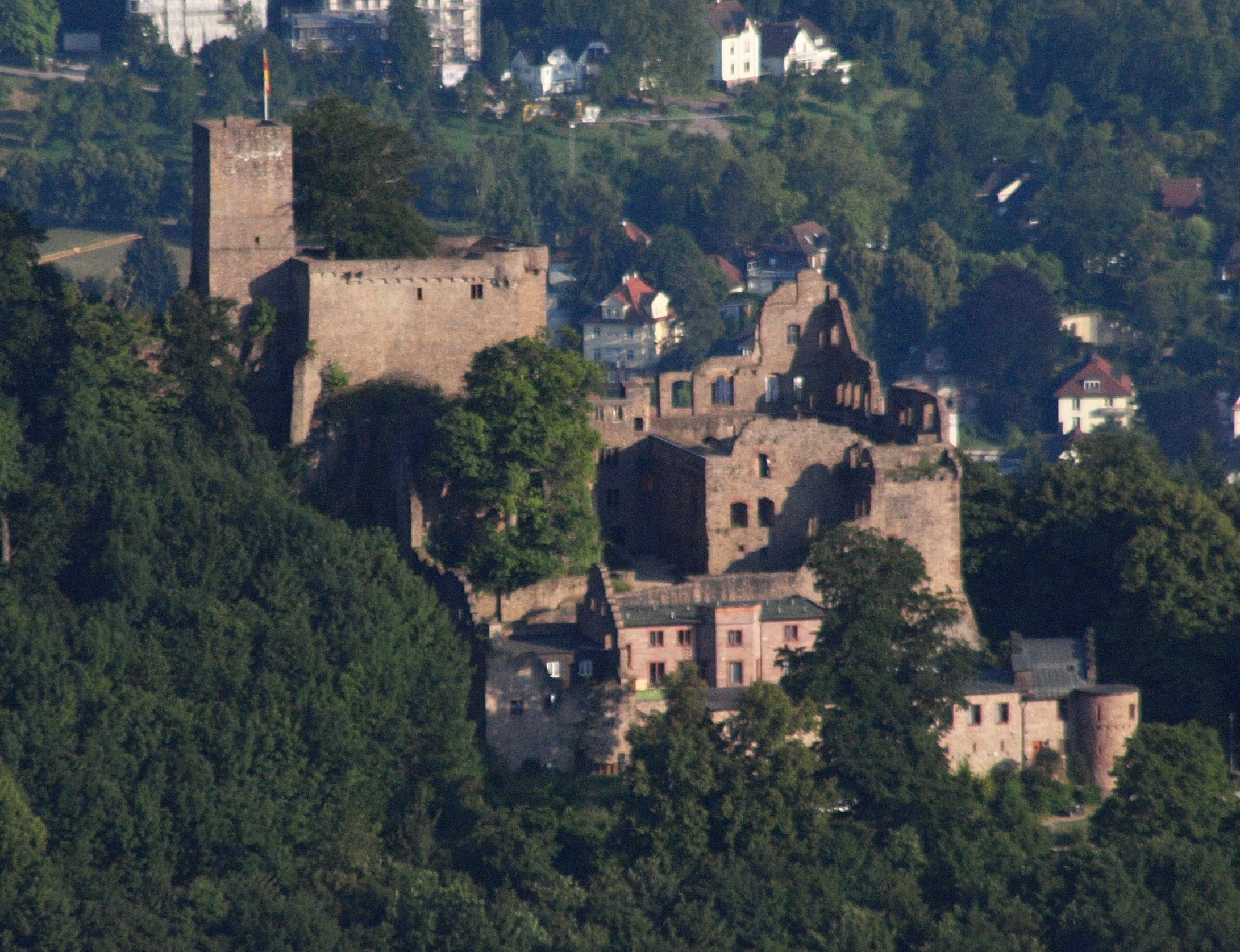
Ruins of Hohenbaden Castle in Baden-Baden

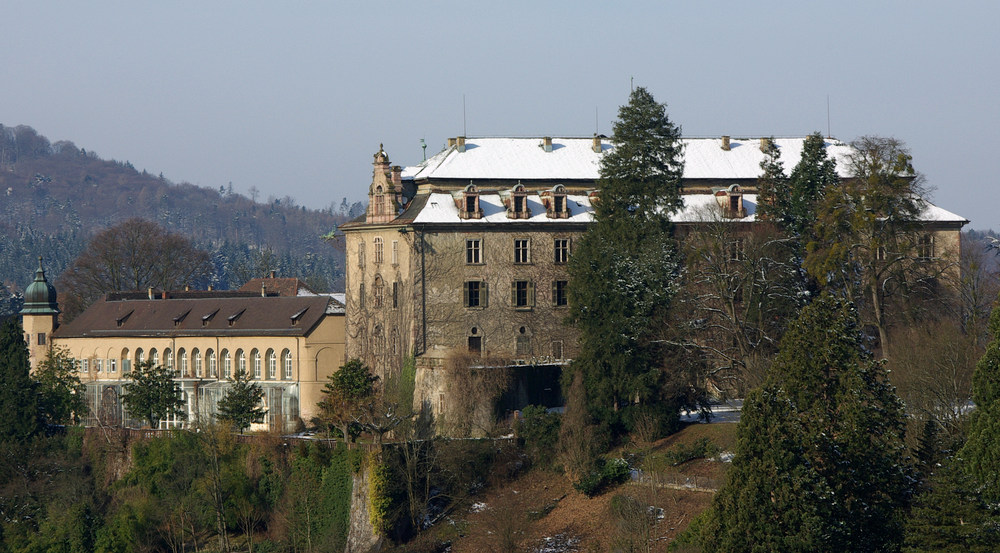
The New Castle of Baden-Baden

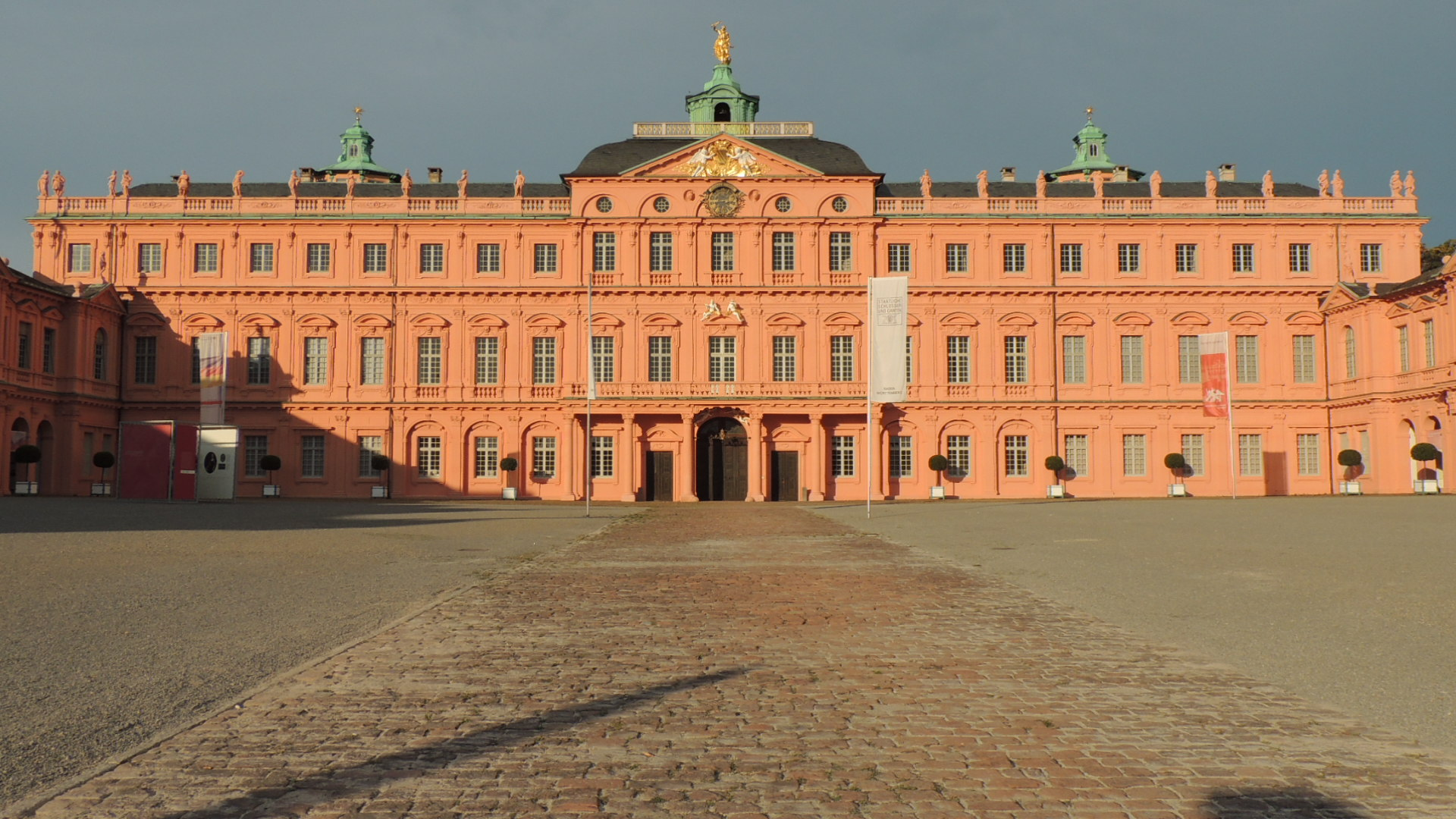
Schloss Rastatt, from 1705 residence of the Margraves of Baden-Baden

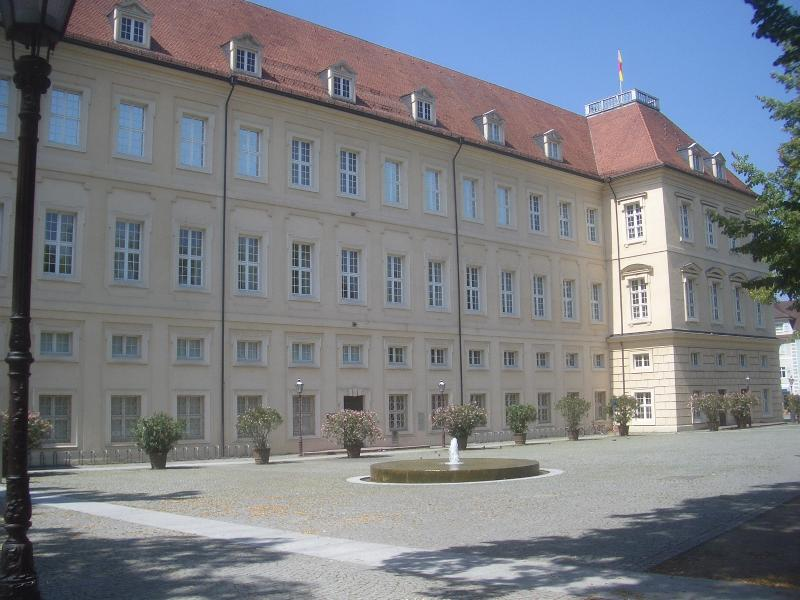
Karlsburg Castle in Durlach, from 1565 residence of the Margraves of Baden-Durlach

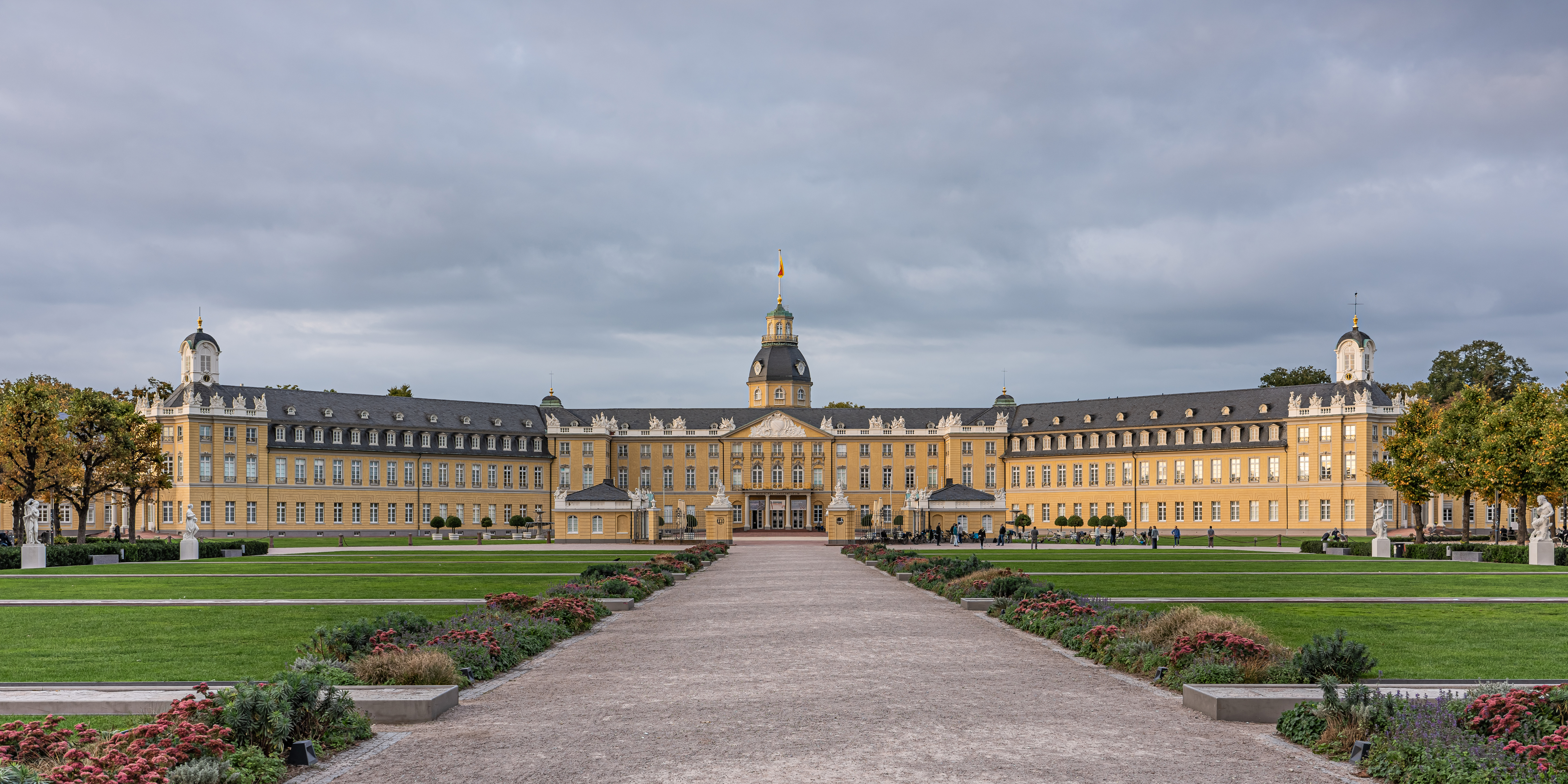
Karlsruhe Palace, from 1718 residence of the Margraves of Baden-Durlach, from 1806 of the Grand Duchy of Baden

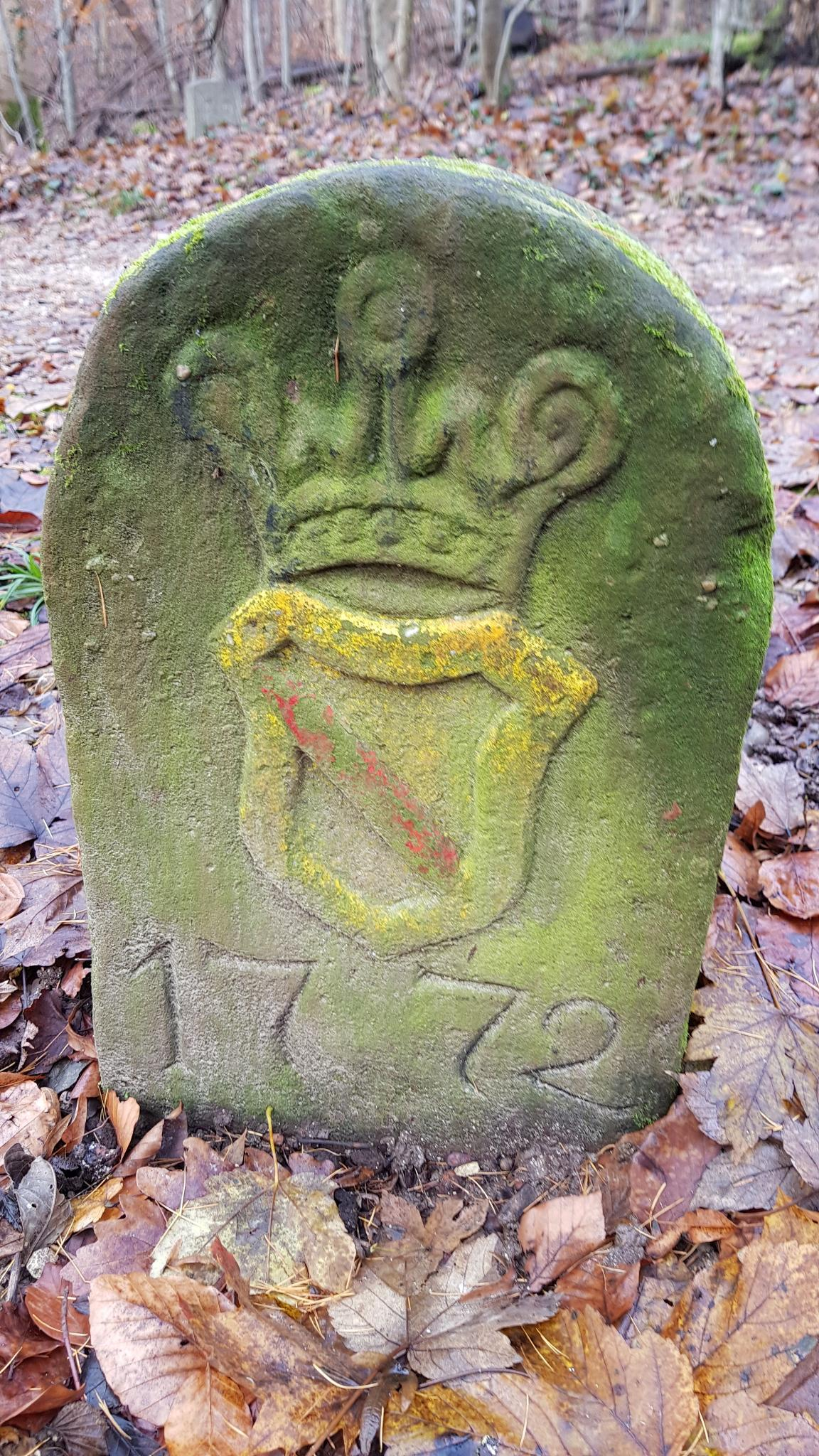
1772 Border stone between Basel and contemporary Baden-Württemberg
