= House of Rötteln =

Medieval noble family from Southern Germany and Switzerland

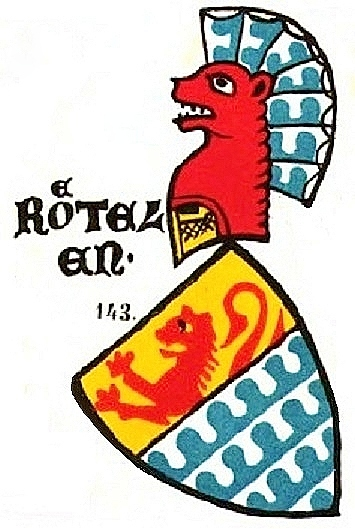
Coat of arms of the House of Rötteln in the Zürich Roll of Arms

The House of Rötteln was a noble family based in the Basel area that can be documented between 1102/3 and 1316. The family, whose castle was located near Lörrach, had large estates in southern Breisgau, particularly in the Wiesental, where a member of the family elevated Schopfheim to the status of a town. Around the middle of the 13th century, the family was at the height of its power, the Röttlers Walther and Lüthold I became bishops of Basel, Lüthold II was about to become provost of the cathedral and bishop elect. With him, the family died out in the male line in 1316 and was inherited by the Margraves of Hachberg-Sausenberg. The Röttler inheritance was an important step in forming the later Markgräflerland.

== History ==
=== The time of Dietrichs ===
The Lords of Rötteln are first mentioned in 1102/3, when the Bishop of Basel, Burkhard von Fenis, appointed a Sir T. von Rötteln as bailiff over the possessions of the monastery of Saint Alban on the right bank of the Rhine. The "T." is unanimously regarded in the literature as "Dietrich" (Theodericum). The areas governed by Dietrich von Rötteln included the churches of Lörrach, Hauingen and Kandern as well as property in Rheinweiler and Ambringen. In the following years, Saint Alban's possessions on the right bank of the Rhine continued to expand, with a certain concentration in the area around Lörrach.

In the first half of the 12th century, only family members with the name Dietrich appear. As there are no further characterisations, it is difficult to provide a more precise name or genealogy. A family tree attempted by Otto Konrad Roller distinguishes Dietrich I (named until 1123) from Dietrich II (named between 1135 and 1147). From 1147 onwards, the family remained completely silent for almost three decades, with a Dietrich von Rötteln not appearing again until 1175. One possible explanation is that the Dietrich (II) mentioned before 1147 died quite young, possibly on the Second Crusade. His widow probably married a lord of Tegerfelden. This also explains why Dietrich III, mentioned from 1175 onwards, referred to the cleric Konrad von Tegerfelden as his brother. Conversely, Konrad later also donated a death anniversary memorialization for the salvation of his "brother" Dietrich von Rötteln, among others. The connection with Tegerfelden also seems to have influenced the naming of the Röttler family, as Dietrich III's children include the names of his presumed half-brother and stepfather, Konrad and Lüthold. Dietrich III no longer appears in the documents after 1187. In 1204, his half-brother Konrad von Tegerfelden donated a bereavement ceremony for him and other relatives.

Dietrich III probably also died relatively young, and it is assumed that his half-brother Konrad von Tegerfelden, who was already a canon of Constance at this time, took care of Dietrich's children. With them, the four brothers Walter/Walther, Lüthold, Konrad and Dietrich (IV), the family became more clearly recognisable and reached a peak of power and development.

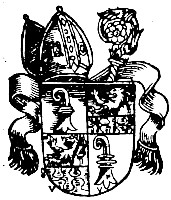
The coat of arms of Bishop Lüthold II with the Röttler coat of arms and the crosier of Basel

=== Bishops Walther and Lüthold ===
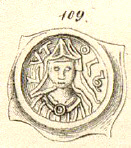
Coin (bracteate) with image of Lüthold von Rötteln

Dietrich III's two presumably eldest sons embarked on an ecclesiastical path. Walther von Rötteln joined the cathedral chapter of Constance as a canon in 1209 or before. Apparently encouraged by his step-uncle Konrad von Tegerfelden, who had meanwhile risen to become Bishop of Constance, Walther became provost of the cathedral in 1211 against the opposition of a faction of the cathedral chapter. The defeated faction took the matter to the Pope, but was defeated. In 1213, he was elected Bishop of Basel and subsequently appears in the documents surrounding King Frederick II. However, complaints soon arose against him that he had squandered church property, and he was deposed in 1215. Walther returned to the diocese of Constance. He had renounced his position as provost of the cathedral after his election as bishop, so that he was initially only a simple canon, but later became archpriest of Constance, archdeacon of Burgundy and cathedral scholastic of Constance.

Walther's brother Lüthold had also joined the cathedral chapter of Constance in the meantime, appearing in documents as a canon from 1215. In the years that followed, Walther and Lüthold often appeared together as witnesses in diocesan documents before Walther died in 1231 or 1232. Lüthold held the offices of Archdeacon of Breisgau and Archdeacon of Burgundy in Constance before he was elected Bishop of Basel in 1238. As such, he is Lüthold II. In the dispute between Emperor Frederick II and the Pope, he proved to be very loyal to the Pope and therefore came into conflict with the city's more pro-imperial burghers: in 1247 he was expelled from Basel and the bishop's palace was stormed and destroyed. Lüthold resigned as bishop in 1248 and died in 1249.

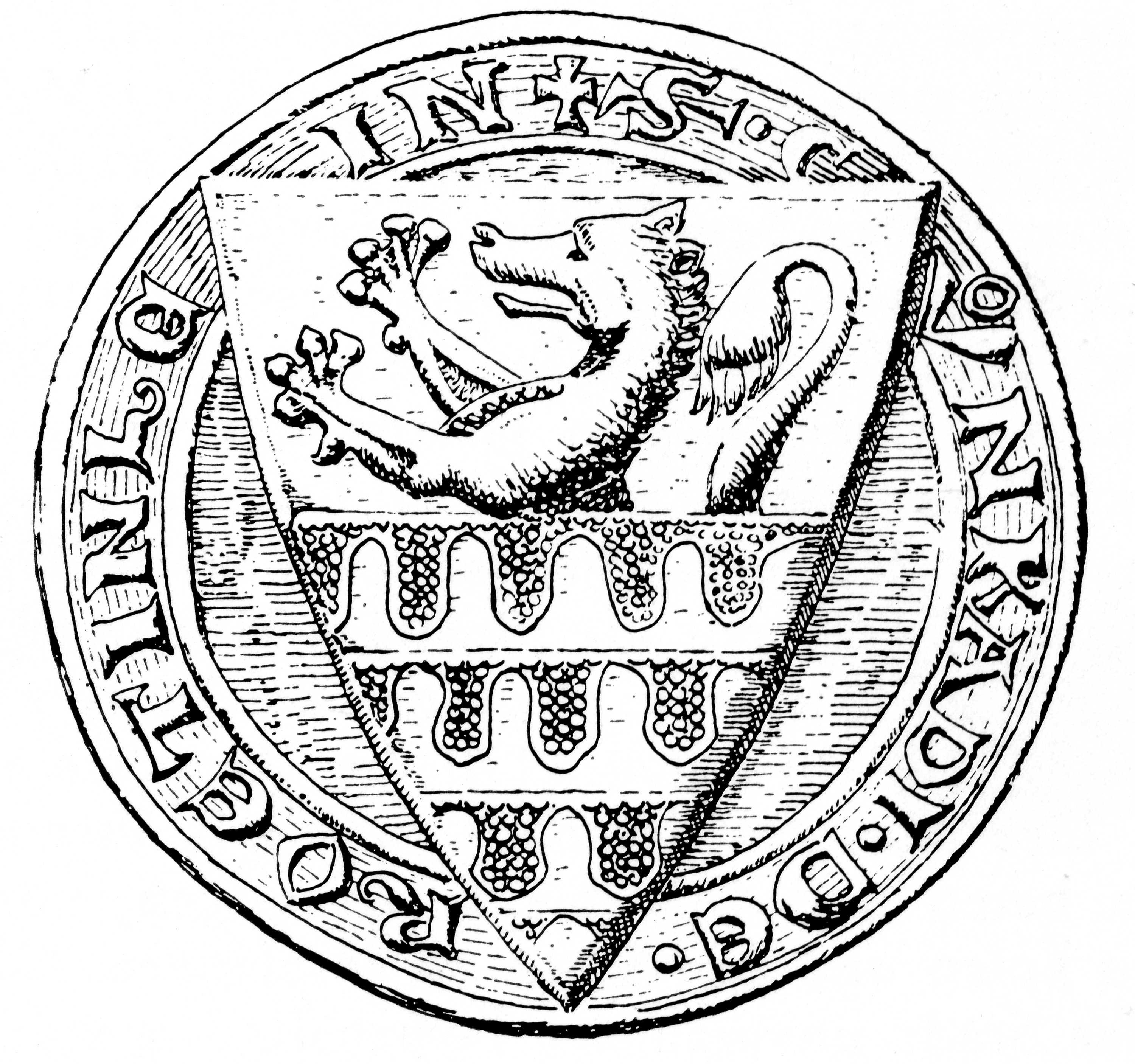
Seal of Konrad von Rötteln

=== Secular Lords of Rötteln ===
The two remaining brothers Konrad and Dietrich IV probably administered the Rötteln estate jointly at first, and only later does there appear to have been a division: Konrad kept Rötteln Castle, Dietrich moved to Rotenburg Castle near Wieslet and founded the secondary branch of the Rotenberg family. However, some possessions continued to be administered jointly, such as the feudal lordship over the vassals. The name of Rotenburg Castle and the collateral branch named after it was probably chosen because of the similarity in sound to the name and castle of the main branch. Dietrich IV died before 1248 and Konrad, who was married to a daughter of Count Ulrich von Neuenburg, apparently took over the guardianship of Dietrich's children Dietrich (V), Konrad and Walter. It was probably during Konrad's time that Schopfheim was elevated to a town and a deep castle was built there; as Konrad was also buried in the parish church of Saint Michael in Schopfheim, he is regarded as the founder of Schopfheim. Konrad von Rötteln had three sons: Walter (II), Otto and Lüthold. Lüthold embarked on a clerical career (see more on this below), Walter and Otto managed the estate together. However, Walter apparently died relatively early and without heirs. After this, Otto took care of the administration of the Röttler dominion and also took part in several feuds. In the disputes between the Psitticher and Sterner knights' unions of Basel, the lords of Rötteln are identified as being on the side of the Psitticher. After the reconciliation of the two parties, Otto also appears to have moved closer to the Habsburgs and received the offices of Burgrave of Rheinfelden and Imperial Bailiff of Basel from King Albrecht.

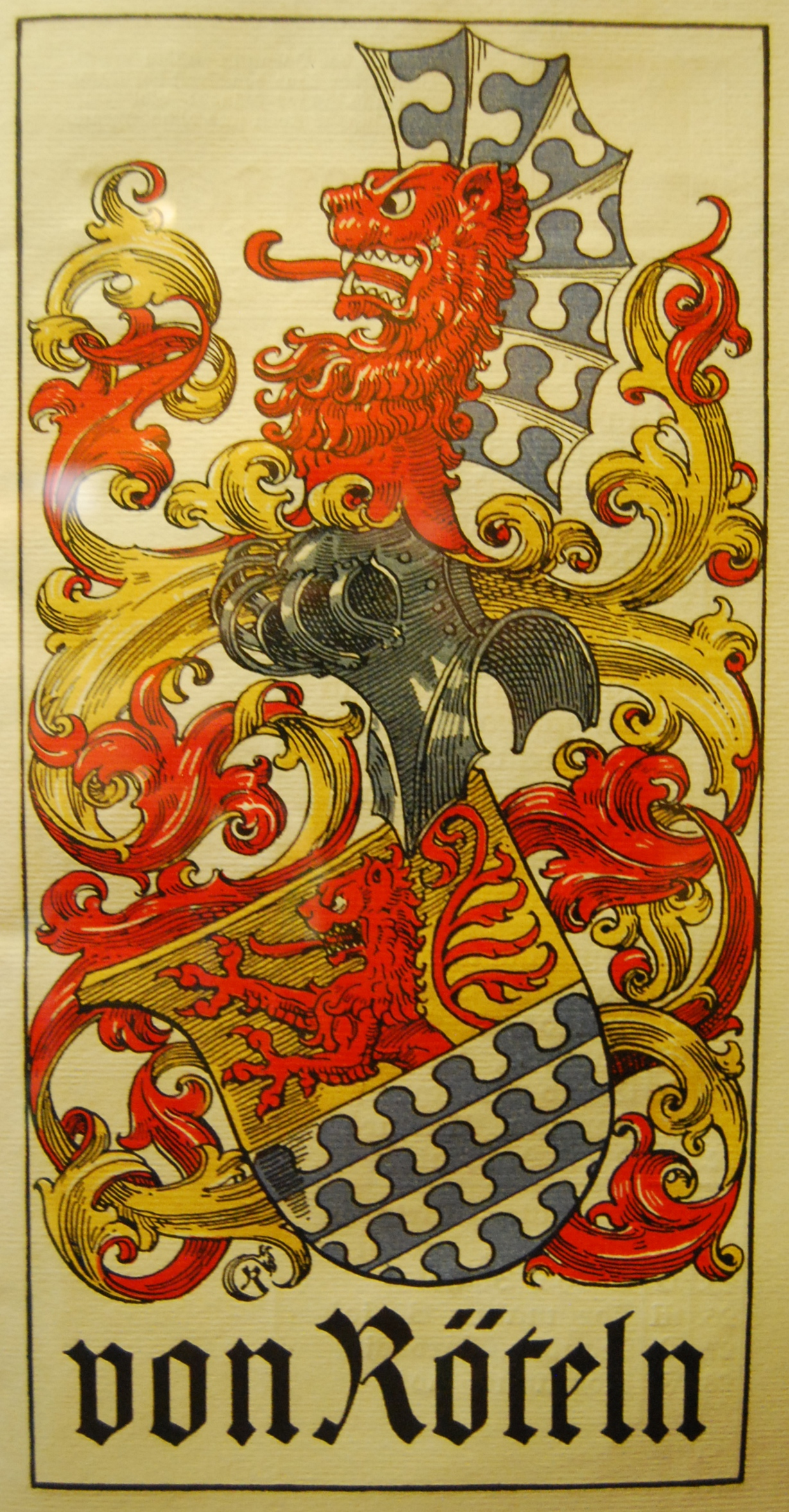

The relationship between the Röttlers and the Rotenbergers apparently deteriorated: when the childless Dietrich V von Rotenberg settled his inheritance in 1278, he gave his property to the monastery of Saint Blaise with the condition that a community of heirs from five families be enfeoffed with it - his Röttler cousins were not among the enfeoffed. Two months before this will, Dietrich had already agreed with the Basel cathedral chapter that the fiefs he held from the monastery would revert to the latter if he died without male heirs. In 1279, the Colmar annals mention a feud between the Bishop of Basel and Otto von Rötteln. According to Otto Roller, the Rotenberg inheritance withheld from the Röttelns was the subject of this feud, in which Otto was ultimately victorious. In any case, the main line seems to have regained possession of the Rotenberg inheritance, albeit possibly via detours.

At the end of the 13th century, there are signs that the financial situation of the Röttlers was no longer so good; Otto von Rötteln sold estates near Schwand to the monastery of Saint Blaise in 1289 to pay off a debt, and in the following years he and his son Walter also renounced further income and sold other estates. The family's entitlement to high ecclesiastical offices may have been one reason for the financial problems: This necessitated an appropriate, expensive lifestyle with marriages befitting their status, in which the daughters had to be endowed with property accordingly. Together with the division of property between Röttler and Rotenberger in the middle of the 13th century, this may have led to a drain on financial resources. It is striking that Otto's debts became acute in 1289, around a year after his brother Lüthold had become Basel's cathedral provost (see below).

Otto von Rötteln became Burgrave of Rheinfelden in 1302 and probably died around 1305. His family is listed in the deed of sale of 1289 and included his wife Richenza, his son Walter and his two daughters Agnes and Benedicta, one of whom was married to Margrave Rudolf von Hachberg-Sausenberg.

=== Lüthold II von Rötteln ===
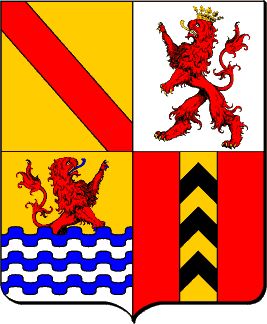
The coat of arms of the Margraviate of Baden after 1444; top right the Lordship of Sausenburg, bottom left the coat of arms of the Lords of Rötteln

In the meantime, Otto's brother Lüthold II von Rötteln, like Walther and Lüthold I before him, had embarked on an ecclesiastical life. He became canon of Basel and is also mentioned in 1275 as the parish priest of eleven churches in the Lordship of Rötteln. In 1289, he became provost of Basel Cathedral and was elected bishop of Basel in a double election in 1296. He and his opponent Berthold von Rüti appealed to the Pope, who asked them both to renounce and made Peter of Aspelt bishop instead. In 1309, after the death of Otto von Grandson, the 82-year-old Lüthold was re-elected bishop, but this time the Pope also decided in favour of another candidate, Gerhard von Wippingen. The cathedral chapter backed Lüthold, however, and the bishop's dispute in Basel lasted several years, at the end of which Lüthold and his supporters in the cathedral chapter had to give in. At the same time, Lüthold was also given the task of settling the Röttler succession. Otto's son Walter (III) had already died on 25 September 1310 or 1311, and with him the last secular lord of Rötteln. Lüthold therefore initially took over the administration of the lordship of Rötteln, albeit with his niece's husband, Margrave Rudolf von Sausenberg, as his new co-ruler. A number of difficulties had to be overcome in the transfer of the Rötteln estate to this next of kin: in 1311, disputes arose again in connection with the Rotenberg inheritance, which were resolved by an arbitration award and the payment of a total of 600 marks of silver to two of the Rotenberg heirs. In 1313, Rudolf von Sausenberg also died, leaving behind three underage sons, so Lüthold once again became the sole ruler of Rötteln. In December 1315, he drew up a will in which he bequeathed his entire estate to his great-nephew, Rudolf's son Heinrich, and on 19 May 1316 he died as the last male member of the Lords of Rötteln. For the Sausenberg margraves, whose possessions dated back to a division of the margraves of Baden-Hachberg in 1306, the Rötteln inheritance meant a significant increase in power, which probably tripled their domain. In the long term, the unification of Rötteln and Sausenberg was the first step in the creation of the later Markgräflerland.

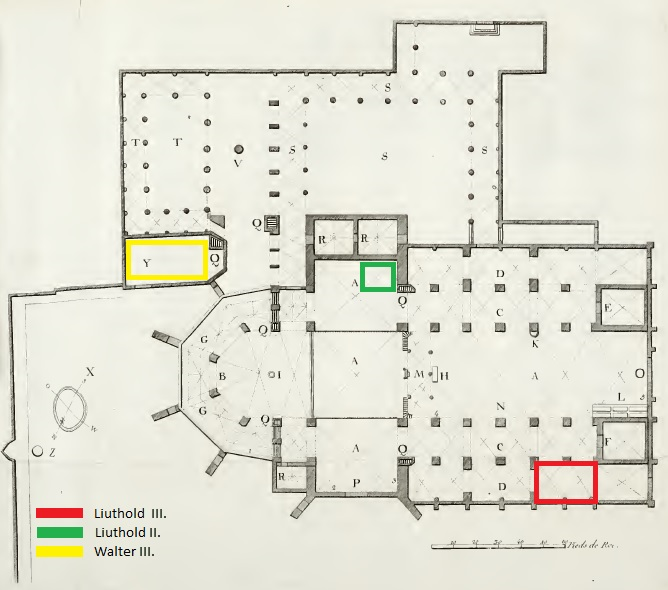
Floor plan of Basel Cathedral with the burial places of the Röttler lords marked out

=== The Lords of Rötteln in the local power structure ===
The Lords of Rötteln were one of the most important Breisgau noble families in the High Middle Ages. Their time also saw a pronounced competitive situation between the Zähringers and the Bishopric of Basel, which also had an impact on the local nobility and led to the formation of groups. Concerning the lords of Rötteln, Otto Roller noted a close relationship with the Zähringers and characterised the Röttlers as "highly ecclesiastical". However, this image has been partially relativised by more modern research: Röttler lords appear only rarely and relatively late as witnesses in Zähringen documents, and their own interests can possibly explain some of these witness services. In comparison, the connection to the Basel diocese appears to have been closer. If so, then the Röttlers in the 12th century can probably only be assigned to the "wider scope of the Zähringer succession". Even in later disputes, such as those between Frederick II and Pope Innocent IV or the conflicts between the Psitticher and Sterner knightly alliances in Basel, the Röttlers do not present a uniform picture: while Walter as Bishop of Basel was closely aligned with Frederick II, his brother Lüthold later appears to have remained loyal to the Pope as Bishop of Basel and came into conflict with the Basel burghers and also with his brothers. Similar conflicts between the Röttler and Rotenbergers also seem to have occurred later: While the Röttler main line is counted among the Psittichers, Dietrich V von Rotenberg appeared several times in the circle of the Sterners and chose several members of Sterner families as heirs with Peter and Matthias Reich as well as Wernher von Eptingen. It is therefore not possible to identify a unified policy of the entire family.

The regional importance of the nobles of Rötteln is also emphasised by the fact that three members of the family once occupied the bishop's seat in Basel. Two of them (Lüthold I and Lüthold II) are also buried in Basel Minster, as is one secular family member (Walter III).

== Origin ==
There are various theories about the exact origins of the Lords of Rötteln. They were certainly named after the hamlet of Rötteln, whose parish church was mentioned in documents as early as 751, long before the noble family. The name Rötteln is a shortening of Raudinleim and refers to red clay. The first landowner to appear in the Rötteln area was the abbey of Saint Gall. However, where and how exactly the Röttler noble family came to its position of power in the Rhine bend is disputed. On the one hand, it is assumed that the Röttler originally came to southern Breisgau from central Swabia with the Zähringen dynasty and descended from a family that was wealthy near Weilheim an der Teck. On the other hand, they could also have been a local family of bailiffs who rose to knighthood. However, the Röttler lords are consistently referred to in the sources as "lords" (domini) or "noblemen" (nobiles viri).

The leading name Dietrich could also indicate a relationship with the Counts of Bürgeln (see Nellenburg) and thus an origin from Thurgau. Another possibility is that the Lords of Rötteln were descended from the ancient noble Hessons, in particular from the Dietrich-Hesso or Hesso-Lampert clan, as they are known in research, to which other nearby noble families also descended, such as the Üsenbergers, Nimburger, Waldeckers and Eichstetten.

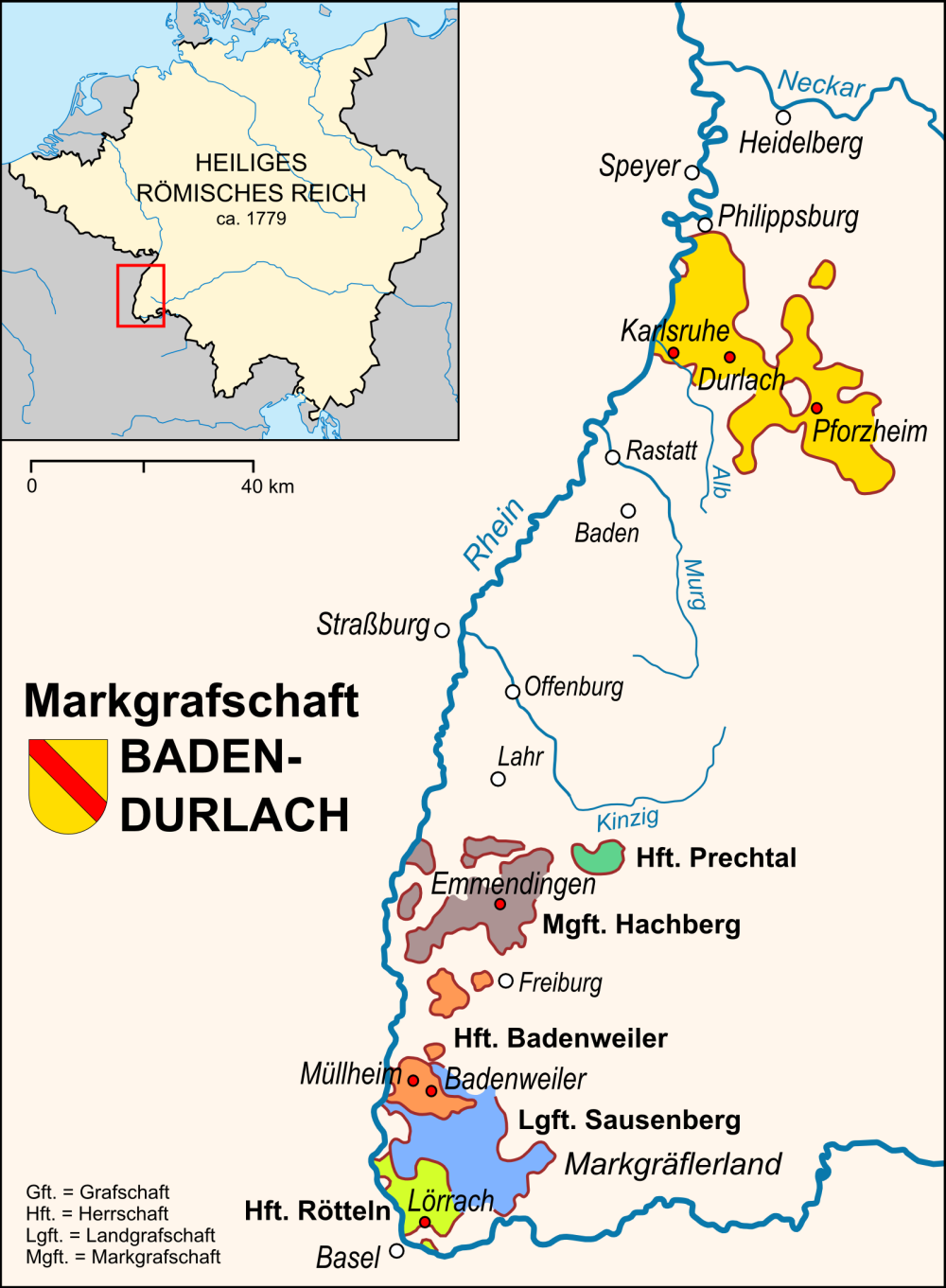
The Margraviate of Baden-Durlach from 1535 to 1771. The possessions of the Lordship of Rötteln included not only Rötteln but also the southern and eastern parts of the late medieval Landgraviate of Sausenberg.

== Possessions ==
The possessions of the Rötteln lords lay in southern Breisgau, particularly around Lörrach and in the valleys of the Great and Little Wiese. According to Thomas Simon, the Lordship of Rötteln formed a "conglomerate of numerous bailiwicks and manorial estates" and was probably also endowed with high court rights. The lords of Rötteln thus had the bailiwick over property belonging to the monasteries of Saint Alban and Saint Blaise and were also ecclesiastical bailiffs over the monastery of Weitenau. The bailiff's possessions lay in particular in Steinen, Fahrnau, Lörrach and around Weitenau. The Röttlers (and later the Rotenbergs) also had a bailiwick over the women's priory in Istein, in the founding and endowment of which they played a key role. Schopfheim was a Habsburg subfief, and another possible feudal lord of the Röttler was the Bishopric of Basel, to which, for example, the Röttler property in Haltingen could be traced back. Further property existed in the Kleines Wiesental valley around Tegernau, where there was a connection between land ownership and bailiwick, which may have been due to an inheritance from the Lords of Waldeck, who died out in the middle of the 12th century. From them, the Röttlers probably inherited sovereign rights in Gresgen and the properties around Tegernau with several hamlets and the village, Dinghof and Tegernau bailiwicks, perhaps also the castles of Neu- and Altwaldeck with ancillary authorities as a Basel fiefdom. Later, the Rotenbergs in particular were evidently propertied in the Kleine Wiesental; when settling his inheritance affairs in 1278, Dietrich V named numerous estates in the Middle and Kleine Wiesental, as well as the church property in Fahrnau. The Röttler apparently had further patronage rights in Kleinkems, Blansingen, Wollbach, Binzen, Ötlingen, Lörrach, Rötteln, Hauingen, Steinen and Herten, as the later Basel cathedral provost Lüthold was mentioned as a parish lord there as early as 1275. Overall, the Röttler estate largely comprised the southern and eastern part of the late medieval landgraviate in the Sausenhart. Landskron Castle near Leymen was granted as a fief to the Münch von Landskron family.

== Other Rötteln families ==
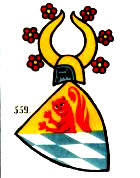
Presumed coat of arms of the Lords of Rötteln (Rotwasserstelz)

=== Rötteln (Rotwasserstelz) ===
"The Castle Rotwasserstelz in Klettgau (municipality of Hohentengen, Waldshut district), which was also called Rötteln, was the name of a ministerial or knightly family...". The known members of this family were, among others, ministerials and feudatories of the Lords of Krenkingen, Lords of Klingen and Lords of Regensberg. A nobleman, Hans von Rötteln, appears in 1362 as a feudatory of Johann II of Habsburg-Laufenburg. From a partially preserved seal of Hermann von Rötteln and a reference in the literature, it was concluded that these Röttelns bore a coat of arms similar to that of the noblemen of Rötteln. However, there is no evidence of a connection between the two families.

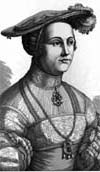
Jeanne de Hochberg

=== The Marquis de Rothelin ===
After the male line of the House of Hachberg-Sausenberg died out in 1503, the name von Rötteln was revived in France. The only daughter of Margrave Philipp, the last Margrave of Hachberg-Sausenberg, was married to Louis I d'Orléans, duc de Longueville. This daughter, Johanna or Jeanne de Hochberg, claimed inheritance to the lordship of Rötteln and her husband also called himself Marquis de Rothelin.

Johanna's son, François, maintained the claims and her grandson from an illegitimate union of her son became known as Bâtard de Rothelin (Bastard of Rötteln). This grandson - also called François - took over the title of Marquis de Rothelin from his father and founded the collateral line Orléans-Rothelin.

Although the inheritance dispute was settled in 1581, the name Orléans-Rothelin was not extinguished until 1818. The most famous member of the family was the scholar Charles d'Orléans de Rothelin, known as l'Abbé de Rothelin.

== Literature ==
- Lamke, Florian (2009). Cluniacenser am Oberrhein: Konfliktlösungen und adlige Gruppenbildung in der Zeit des Investiturstreits (Thesis) (in German). Freiburg [im Breisgau]: K. Alber. ISBN 9783495499542.
- Moehring, Gerhard (2001). "Rötteln – geschichtliche Daten und Erinnerungen zur Kirche und ihres Erbauers 750–1550". Das Markgräflerland: Beiträge zu seiner Geschichte und Kultur (in German). 63 (1): 15–52.
- Roller, Otto Konrad (1927). Die Geschichte der Edelherren von Rötteln. Blätter aus der Markgrafschaft Schopfheim (in German). Schopfheim.
- Schomann, Sven (2009). "Hagen (Lörrach, LÖ): Burg Rötteln". In Zettler, Alfons; Zotz, Thomas (eds.). Die Burgen Im Mittelalterlichen Breisgau II.: Sudlicher Teil, Halbband a - k (in German). Ostfildern: Jan Thorbecke.
- Schwarzmaier, Hansmartin (1983). "Lörrach im Mittelalter". In Wittmann, Otto; Lörrach (eds.). Lörrach: Landschaft, Geschichte, Kultur (in German). Lörrach: Stadt Lörrach. ISBN 978-3-9800841-0-9.
- Simon, Thomas (1995). Grundherrschaft und Vogtei: eine Strukturanalyse spätmittelalterlicher und frühneuzeitlicher Herrschaftsbildung (Dissertation thesis) (in German). Frankfurt am Main: Universität Freiburg i. Br. Klostermann. ISBN 3465026985.
