= Rothelin =

Rothelin is the French name of Rötteln Castle and the village of Rötteln in Germany.

It may also refer to:

- Rothelin Continuation (c. 1265), Old French history
- Jacqueline de Rohan, Marquise de Rothelin (c. 1520–1587), French noblewoman
- Charles d'Orléans de Rothelin (1691–1744), French churchman and bibliophile
