= Otto I of Hachberg-Sausenberg =

Margrave of Hachberg-Sausenberg

Otto I, Margrave of Hachberg-Sausenberg
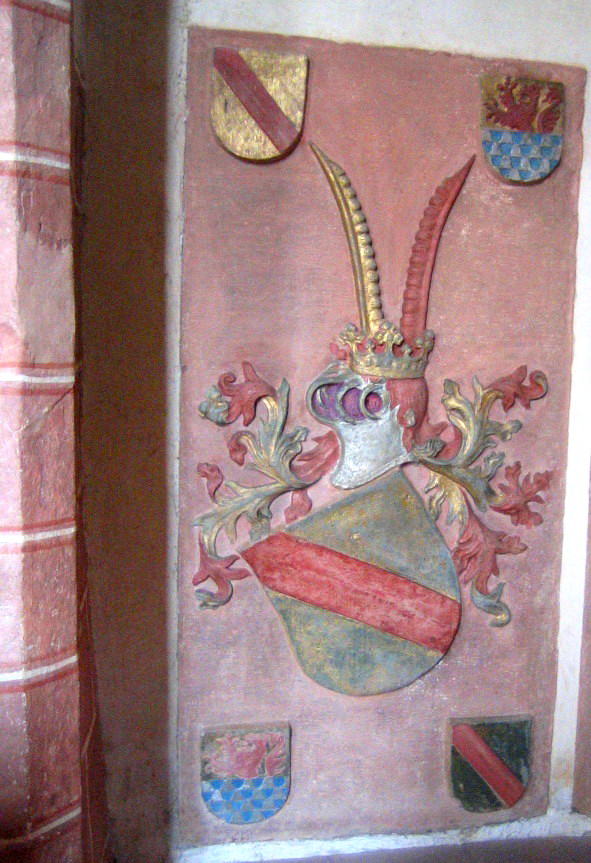
- Grave stone bearing Otto's coat of arms, in the church of Sitzenkirch
- Born: 1302
- Died: 1384 (aged 81–82)
- Buried: Church of Sizenkirch (now part of Kandern)
- Noble family: House of Zähringen
- Spouses: Catherine of Grandson; Elisabeth of Strasbourg
- Father: Rudolf I, Margrave of Hachberg-Sausenberg
- Mother: Agnes of Röttlen

Otto I, Margrave of Hachberg-Sausenberg (1302 – 1384) was a member of the House of Zähringen. He was the ruling Margrave of Rötteln and Sausenberg from 1318 until his death.

== Life ==
He was the son of Margrave Rudolf I of Hachberg-Sausenberg and his wife Agnes, the heiress of Otto of Rötteln. After his brother Henry died in 1318, Otto took up government of Rötteln and Sausenberg. Initially, he ruled jointly with his brother Rudolf II. He moved the family residence from Sausenburg Castle to Rötteln Castle.

In the autumn of 1332, troops from Basel besieged Rötteln, because Otto (or his brother) had stabbed the mayor of Basel. This conflict was settled after mediation by the nobility of Basel and Sausenberg.

After Rudolf II died in 1352, he took up guardianship of his nephew Rudolf III. In 1358, he transferred this guardianship to Walram of Thierstein. From 1364, Otto I ruled jointly with his nephew Rudolf III. In 1366, Otto and Rudolf donated an altar to the church in Sitzenkirch.

Otto I died in 1384 and was buried in the church in Sitzenkirch. Sitzenkirch is today part of Kandern and the church is now an Evangelical Church.

He was married twice: first with Catherine of Grandson, and after her death with Elisabeth of Strassberg (d. 1352). Both marriages were childless.

== Seals of Otto I ==
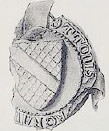

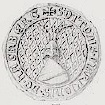

== See also ==
- List of rulers of Baden

== Footnotes ==
Otto I of Hachberg-Sausenberg House of Zähringen Born: 1302 Died: 1384
Preceded by Henry	Margrave of Hachberg-Sausenberg; 1318-1384; With: Rudolf II (until 1352) and Rudolf III (after 1352)	Succeeded by Rudolf III
