= Rudolf III of Hachberg-Sausenberg =

Margrave of Hachberg-Sausenberg

Rudolf III, Margrave of Hachberg-Sausenberg
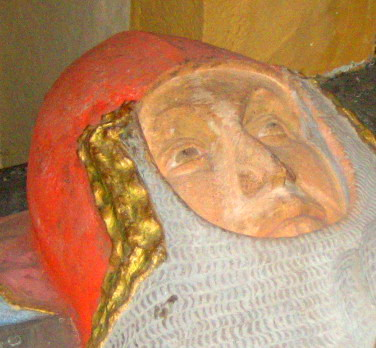
- Portrait of Rudolf III on his tomb in the Gallus church in Rötteln
- Born: 1343
- Died: 1428 (aged 84–85)
- Buried: Gallus Church in Rötteln
- Noble family: House of Zähringen
- Spouses: Adelheid of Lichtenberg; Anne of Freiburg-Neuchâtel
- Issue: Otto III of Hachberg; William, Margrave of Hachberg-Sausenberg
- Father: Rudolf II, Margrave of Hachberg-Sausenberg
- Mother: Catherine of Thierstein

Margrave Rudolf III of Hachberg-Sausenberg (1343–1428) was the son of Margrave Rudolf II of Hachberg-Sausenberg and Catherine of Thierstein. He inherited Hachberg-Sausenberg when his father died in 1352. As he was a minor at the time, his uncle Otto I acted as regent. When Rudolf II came of age, he and Otto I ruled jointly, until Otto's death in 1384. Rudolf III is considered the most important of the Margraves of Hachberg-Sausenberg.

== Reign ==
=== Construction activities ===
Rudolf III initiated a number of construction projects. Two gatehouses, one large building and a tower were added to his residence Rötteln Castle in 1360. In 1387 and 1392, other large buildings were added. In 1401, he built a church in the village of Rötteln (now the Evangelical Church). In 1418, he expanded this church to the main church of his territory. Rudolf's tomb and the tomb of his second wife, Anna, both in this church, are considered major examples of Gothic art in the Upper Rhine.

=== Expansion of the country's sovereignty ===
During his long reign, Rudolf was able to extend his country's sovereignty significantly:

- In 1365, he exchanged the village Huttinger against Höllstein (with the Bishop of Basel)
- In 1366, he received a share of Sausenberg from his uncle Otto I
- In 1368 he purchased the villages of Weil am Rhein, Wintersweiler, Welmlingen, plus some manors in Haltingen and the city and district of Otlikon from Knight Konrad of Münch. He also purchased Dossebach from William of Hauenstein and his son Henman of Hauenstein
- In 1394, Bishop Conrad of Münch, enfeoffed him with a fief in Breisgau
- In 1400, he purchased the Lordship of Neuenstein, including the villages of Gersbach, Schlechtbach, Raitbach, Kürnberg and Schweigmatt. Neuenstein Castle had been enfeoffed to the monastery of St. Blasien, but in 1401, the monastery renounced its rights on the castle.

== Marriage and issue ==
Rudolf III first married Adelheid of Lichtenberg and later Anne of Freiburg-Neuchâtel. On 13 February 1387, Rudolf closed a marriage contract with Konrad of Freiburg and Else of Neuchâtel for Konrad's 13-year-old sister Anna. Her dowry would be 12000florins, in the form of the city and district of Sennheim valued at 7500 florins, Istein Castle, valued at 3000 florins, 1500 florins in cash, on the condition that he would use it to create manors in the area between Hauenstein, the forest and the mountains on both sides of the river, within one year after the wedding. With Anne, he had seven sons and six daughters. One son and three daughters fell victim to the plague in 1420. His son Otto (1388–1451) was Bishop of Constance from 1411 to 1434 as Otto III of Hachberg and was the host of the Council of Constance in 1415. As such, he was involved in the burning at the stake of the Czech reformer Jan Hus. The only other son to survive him, was the youngest, William, who succeeded him in 1428.

== See also ==
- Margraviate of Baden
- Baden
- List of rulers of Baden

== Footnotes ==
Rudolf III of Hachberg-Sausenberg House of Zähringen Born: 1343 Died: 1428
Preceded by Rudolf II; With: Otto I	Margrave of Hachberg-Sausenberg; 1352-1428; With: Otto I until 1384	Succeeded by William

== Gallery ==
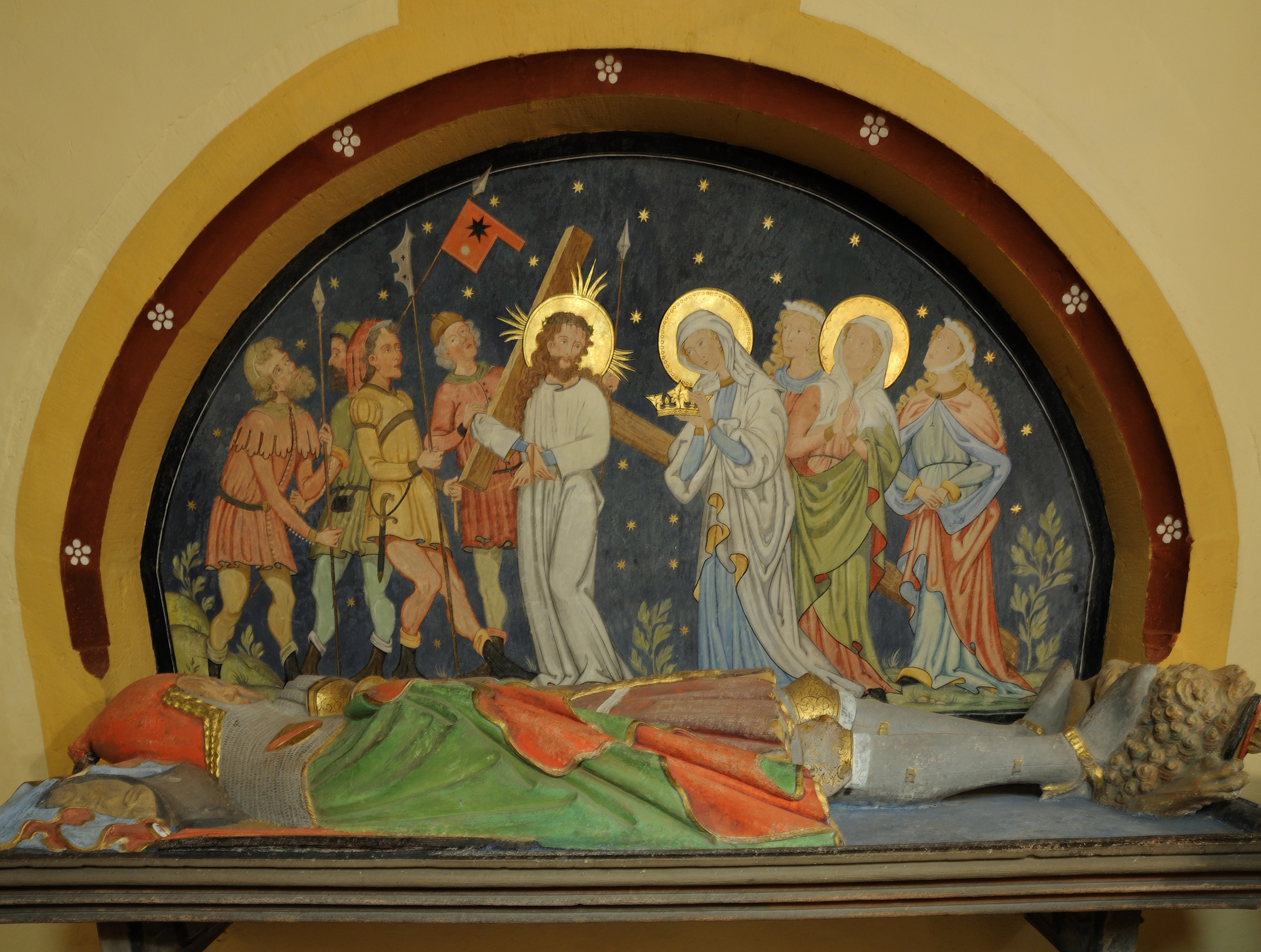

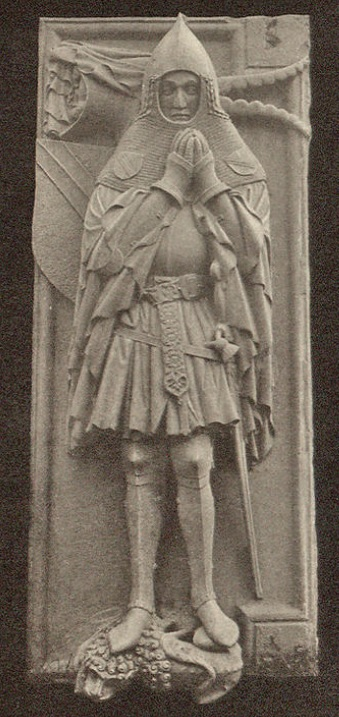

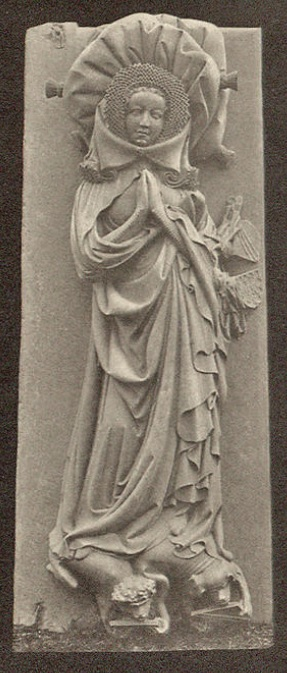

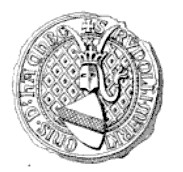

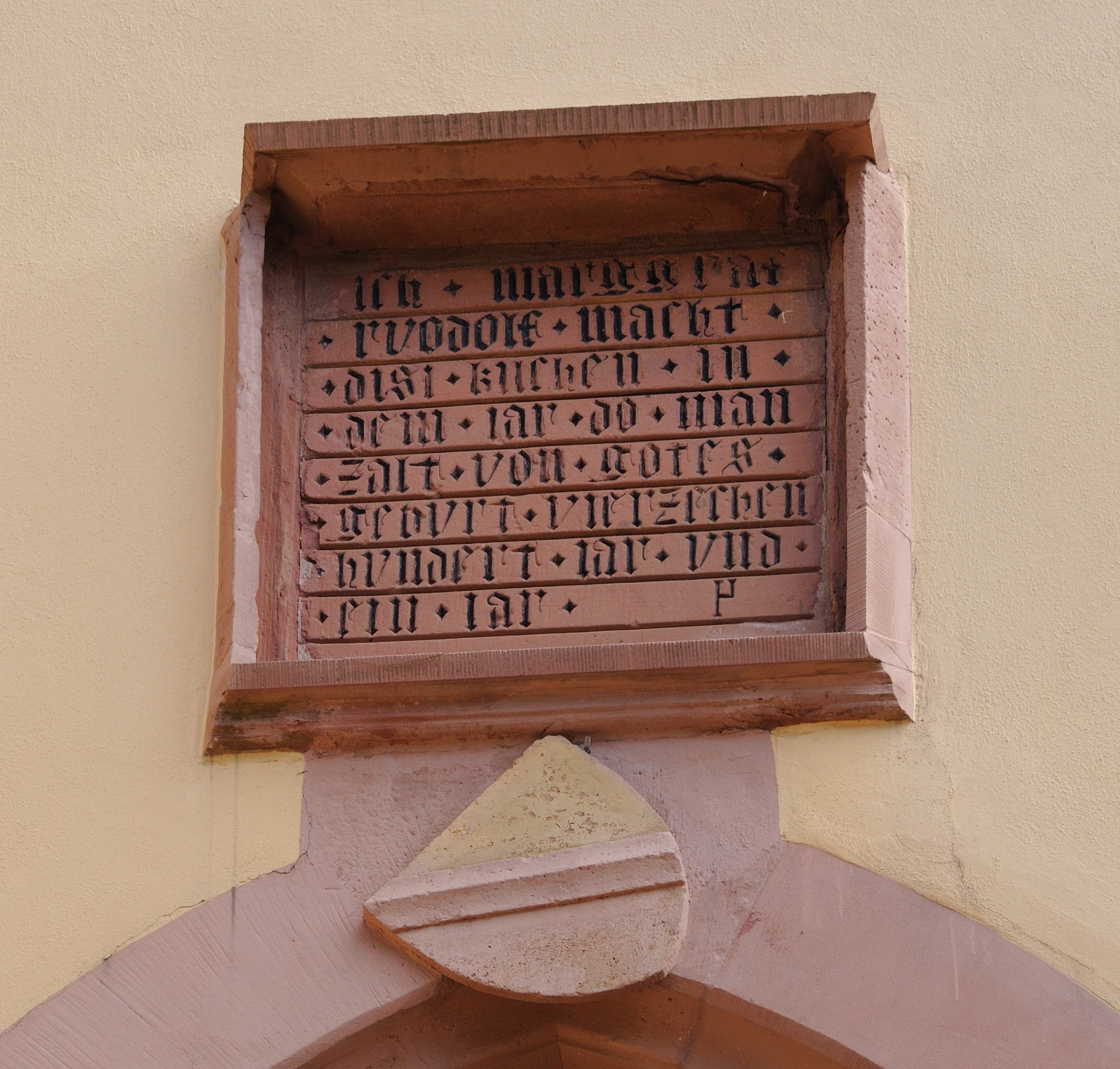
