= Rudolf II of Hachberg-Sausenberg =

14th Century Margrave of Hachberg-Sausenberg

Rudolf II, Margrave of Hachberg-Sausenberg
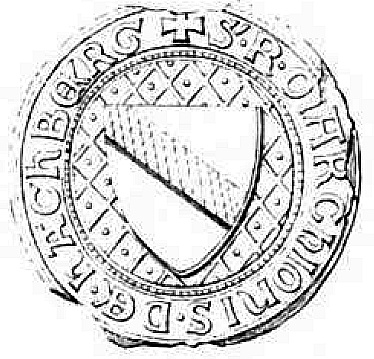
- + S[IGILLUM] R[UDOLFI] MARCHIONIS DE HACHBERG
- Born: 1301
- Died: 1352 (aged 50–51)
- Noble family: House of Zähringen
- Spouse: Catherine of Thierstein
- Issue: Rudolf III, Margrave of Hachberg-Sausenberg
- Father: Rudolf I, Margrave of Hachberg-Sausenberg
- Mother: Agnes of Rötteln

Margrave Rudolf II of Hachberg-Sausenberg (medieval: Rudolf II of Hachberg-Susenberg) (1301–1352) was the son of Margrave Rudolf I of Hachberg-Sausenberg and his wife Agnes, the heiress of Otto of Rötteln. After their elder brother Henry died in 1318, Rudolf II and his younger brother Otto I took up government in Rötteln and Sausenberg. They moved their seat of government from Sausenburg Castle to Rötteln Castle. In the fall of 1332, troops from the City of Basel besieged Rötteln Castle, because one of the brothers had stabbed the mayor of Basel. The conflict was settled after mediation by the nobility of the city and the margraviate.

== Marriage and issue ==
Rudolf II was married to Catherine, the daughter of Ulrich of Thierstein. Two children are documented:

- Rudolf III (1343–1428), his successor
- Agnes (d. around 1405), married Baron Burkhard II of Buchegg (d. after 10 June 1365)

== See also ==
- Margraviate of Baden
- Baden
- List of rulers of Baden

== Footnotes ==
Rudolf II of Hachberg-Sausenberg House of Zähringen Born: 1301 Died: 1352
Preceded by Henry	Margrave of Hachberg-Sausenberg; 1318-1352; With: Otto I	Succeeded by Rudolf III
