= Otto III of Hachberg =

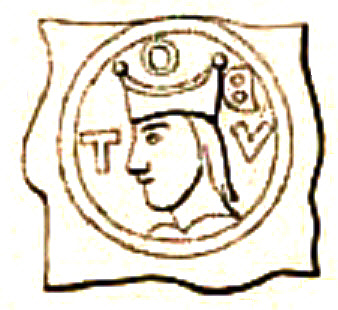
- Bracteate of Otto III bishop of Constance
- Born: 6 March 1388; Rötteln Castle
- Died: 14 November 1451 (aged 63); Constance
- Noble family: House of Zähringen
- Father: Rudolf III, Margrave of Hachberg-Sausenberg
- Mother: Anne of Freiburg-Neuchâtel

Otto III of Hachberg (6 March 1388 at Rötteln Castle – 14 November 1451 in Constance) was Bishop of Constance from 1410 to 1434. During this time he was the host of the Council of Constance (1414–1418). Although he was the second person named Otto in the Hachberg-Sausenberg line of the House of Zähringen, he is consistently called Otto III in the literature, because he was the third bishop of Constance named Otto.

Otto was the eldest son of Margrave Rudolf III of Hachberg-Sausenberg and his second wife, Anne of Freiburg-Neuchâtel.

== Bishop of Constance ==
=== Becoming bishop ===
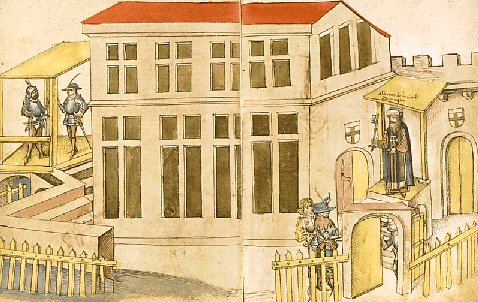
Building where the Council of Constance was held in 1415, picture from the chronicle of Ulrich Richental

Already in 1403, when he was just 15 years old, he was mentioned as a canon in Basel. Pope Boniface IX recommended his appointment. This was probably a reward for Otto's father, Margrave Rudolf III, who had changed sides and supported Boniface IX in Rome, against Antipope Benedict XIII in Avignon. In 1404, Otto III enrolled at the University of Heidelberg. The entry in the register describes him as a canon of Basel and Cologne and a cleric of Constance.

In 1409 and 1410, Rudolf III negotiated with Bishop Albert of Constance. Rudolf proposed that Albert would abdicate in favour of Otto, and Rudolf would financially compensate Albert. Rudolf knew his plan would be backed by the pope in Rome, as well as by the antipope supported by Albert, and they agreed to push the plan through, despite opposition from the cathedral chapter. On 11 July 1410, Albert and Rudolf III reached an agreement. As expected, the cathedral chapter initially opposed the deal. Nevertheless, the appointment of Otto III was confirmed by Antipope John XXIII. On 2 February 1411, Otto III took over the administration of the Bishopric of Constance. However, he was never consecrated.

=== Reign ===
Otto III had to deal with a highly indebted bishopric, and he to expand his episcopal palace to accommodate the Council of Constance. In 1423, he initiated an expansion of the St. Margaret's Chapel and later an expansion of the Minster. In general, Otto III was regarded as spending too much on construction activities, thereby increasing the debts of an already highly indebted diocese.

Otto III suffered from chronic health problems. When political pressure and financial problems mounted in 1424, he took a leave of absence. The cathedral chapter was to appoint an administrator during his absence. In 1427, he attempted to return to power, and ran into a new dispute with the cathedral chapter. He deposed several high diocesan officials and by 1429, he managed to regain control of the bishopric.

In 1431, the conflict with the chapter escalated again, and Otto III temporarily moved his residence to Schaffhausen. On 20 April 1431, Otto III became a member of the Order of St. George. The Council of Basel ruled in Otto's favour in 1432. Nevertheless, the conflict continued. In 1432, there were three competing Corpus Christi processions. Another ruling by the Council of Basel partially deposed him.

In 1433, Otto's health problems worsened. He negotiated with Count Frederick XII of Hohenzollern about a transfer of power. The cathedral chapter again objected and representatives of the Pope had to mediate. Otto was deposed as bishop of Constance on 6 September 1434, and was appointed instead as the titular bishop of Caesarea.

== Independent scholar ==
After he was deposed (or he resigned, as it is often described in the literature), Otto continued to expand his personal library, which he had starting in the days of the Council of Constance. He purchased books and commissioned private copies. He owned a complete copy of the Corpus Iuris Canonici, and works on Roman law and canon law. Another focal point were Marian devotions.

His library also contains three manuscripts to treatises he wrote himself. One of these is the treatise De Conceptione beatae virginis. This was his contribution to a local debate in Constance between the Franciscans and the Dominicans. Otto III was not involved in the debate at the Council of Basel on this topic, although he did send a copy of his treatise to the council, even though he disagreed with their opposition to the Pope, whom he supported. In March 1446, John of Segovia confirmed Otto's views regarding the Immaculate Conception of Mary.

Otto III died in 1451. His brother William sold his library to Frederick Wartenberg, the abbot of Reichenau Abbey. His estate thus became part of the famous Reichenau library.

== Gallery ==
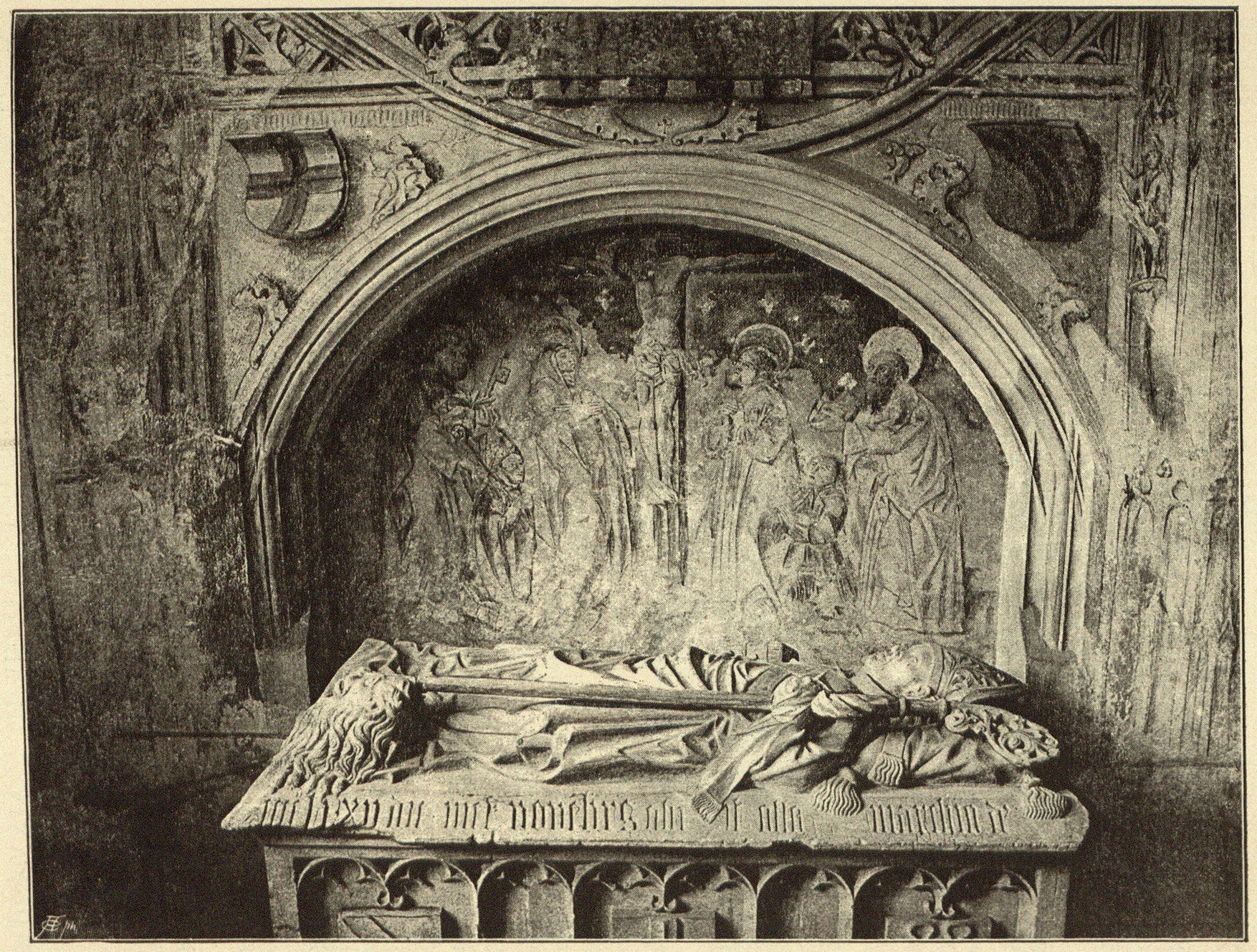

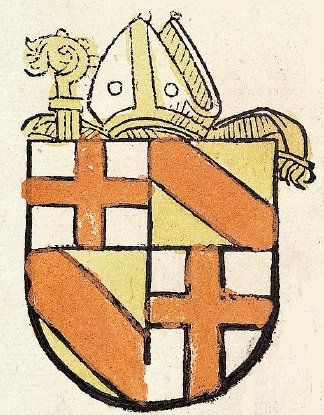

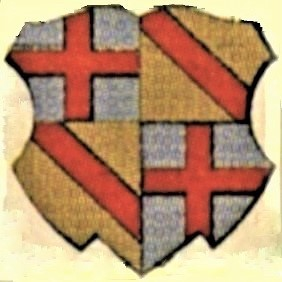
Coat of arms of Otto III, part of the table of coats of arms of the bishops of Constance by Franz Xaver Stiehle

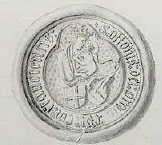

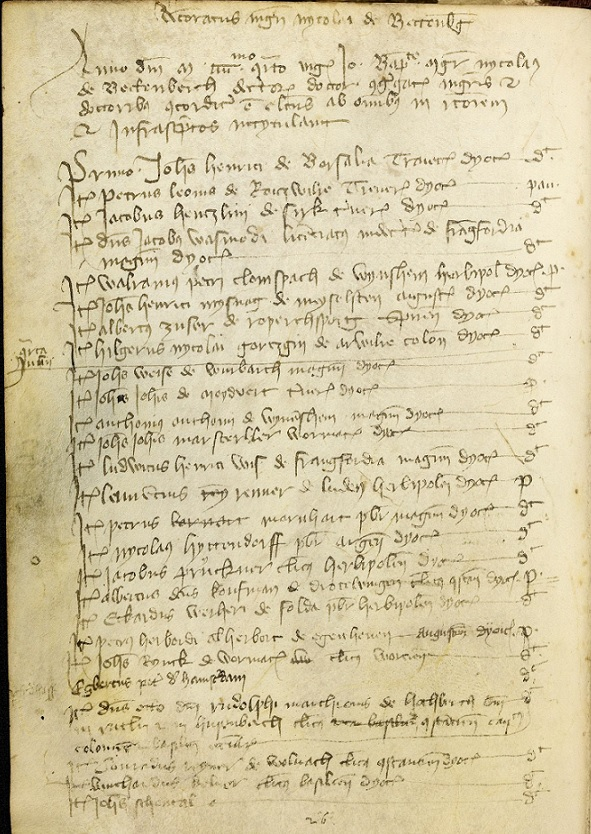

Otto III of Hachberg House of Zähringen Born: 6 March 1388 Died: 14 November 1451
Preceded by Albert Blarer	Bishop of Constance; 1410-1434	Succeeded by Frederick III
