= Rudolf I of Hachberg-Sausenberg =

German Margrave

Rudolf I, Margrave of Hachberg-Sausenberg
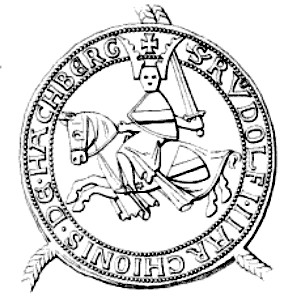
- + S[IGILLUM] RUDOLFI MARCHIONIS DE HACHBERG
- Died: 1313
- Noble family: House of Zähringen
- Spouse: Agnes of Rötteln
- Issue: Henry, Margrave of Hachberg-Sausenberg; Rudolf II, Margrave of Hachberg-Sausenberg; Otto I, Margrave of Hachberg-Sausenberg
- Father: Henry II, Margrave of Baden-Hachberg
- Mother: Anne of Üsenberg

Margrave Rudolf I of Hachberg-Sausenberg (d. 1313) was the son of Margrave Henry II of Hachberg and Anne of Üsenberg. He married in 1298 or 1299 to Agnes, the heiress of Otto of Rötteln. In 1306 he founded the side-line Hachberg-Sausenberg at Sausenburg Castle, a castle which the Margraves of Hachberg had built in 1240 on top of Mount Sausenberg. His elder brother Henry III continued the main Baden-Hachberg line at Hochburg castle in Emmendingen.

In 1311 Lord Lüthold II of Rötteln made Rudolf his co-ruler at Rötteln Castle. This established the foundation for the rise of the Hachberg-Sausenberg line. Rudolf himself died before Lüthold. In 1315, Lüthold donated the Lordship of Rötteln to Rudolf's son Henry, who came of age in that year.

He had three children: Henry, Rudolf II and Otto I.

== See also ==
- Margraviate of Baden
- List of rulers of Baden

== Footnotes ==
Rudolf I of Hachberg-Sausenberg House of Zähringen Died: 1313
Preceded by Henry II as Margrave of Baden-Hachberg	Margrave of Hachberg-Sausenberg; 1306-1312	Succeeded by Henry
