= Henry, Margrave of Hachberg-Sausenberg =

14th Century Margrave of Hachberg-Sausenberg

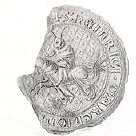
- + S[IGILLUM] HEINRICI MARCHIONIS [DE HACHBERG]
- Born: 1300
- Died: 1318 (aged 17–18)
- Noble family: House of Zähringen
- Father: Rudolf I, Margrave of Hachberg-Sausenberg
- Mother: Agnes of Rötteln

Henry, Margrave of Hachberg-Sausenberg (1300-1318) was the son of Margrave Rudolf I of Hachberg-Sausenberg and his wife Agnes, who was the daughter and heiress of Otto of Rötteln. In 1312, when he was still a minor, he inherited his father's possessions. After he came of age in 1315, his uncle Lüthold II of Röttlen gave him the Lordship of Rötteln. Lüthold II died in 1316.

Henry died young, in 1318, at the age of 18. After his death, his younger brothers Rudolf II and Otto took up the reign of the Lordships Rötteln and Sausenberg.

== See also ==
- Margraviate of Baden
- List of rulers of Baden

Henry, Margrave of Hachberg-Sausenberg House of Zähringen Born: 1300 Died: 1318
Preceded by Rudolf I	Margrave of Hachberg-Sausenberg; 1312-1318	Succeeded by Otto I Rudolf II
