= Burgfestspiele Rötteln =

Coordinates: 47.63709°N 7.66786°E

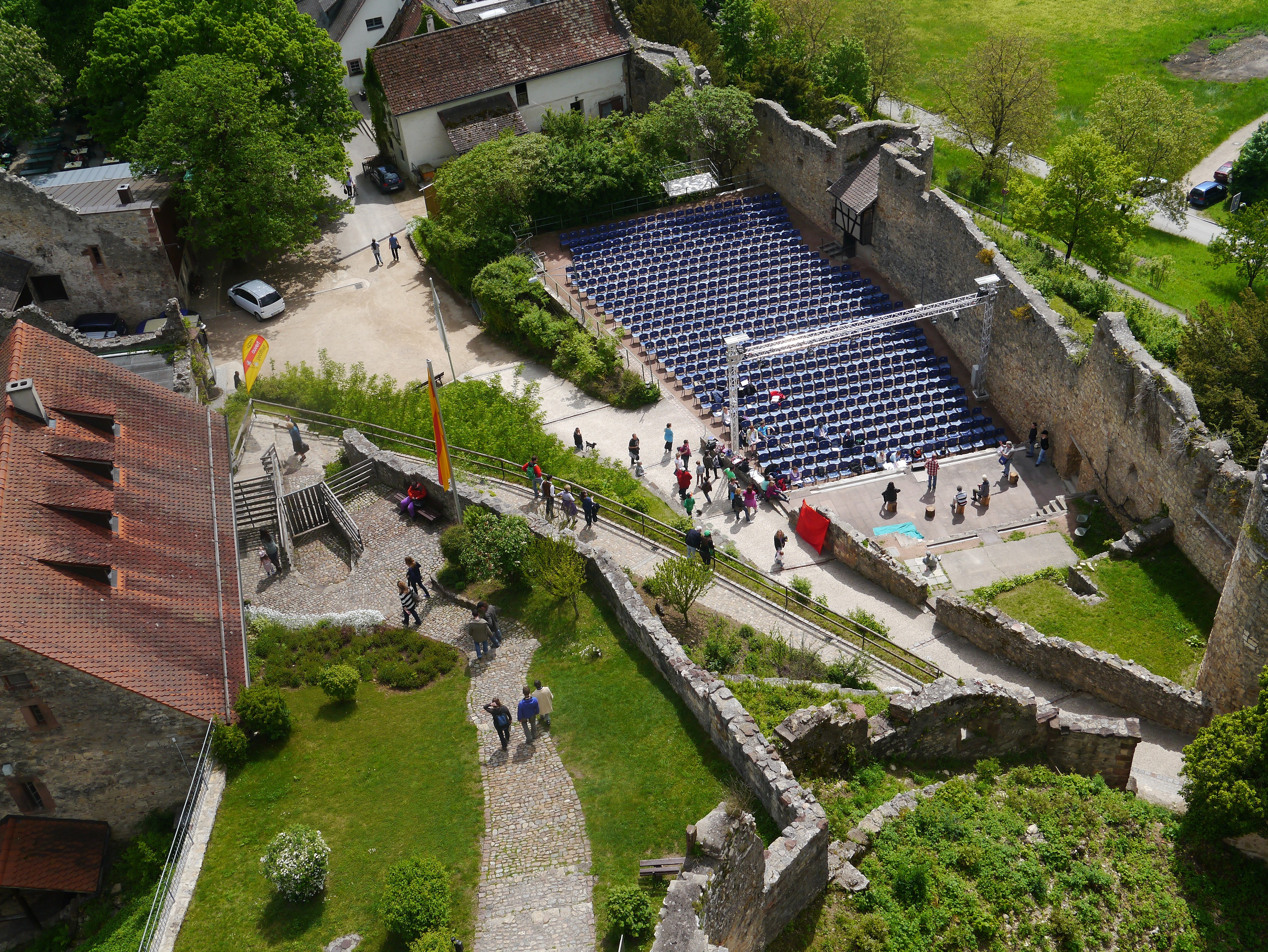
Open air theatre on Rötteln castle

Burgfestspiele Rötteln is an open-air theatre in Lörrach (Baden-Württemberg, Germany) performing on Rötteln castle. The festival has been running for over 50 years.

In 2022, a staging of "Death on the Nile" and in 2023, the festival featured "Das Leben ist ein Fest", a modern comedy by Olivier Nakache and Éric Toledano.
