= Konrad von Tegerfelden =

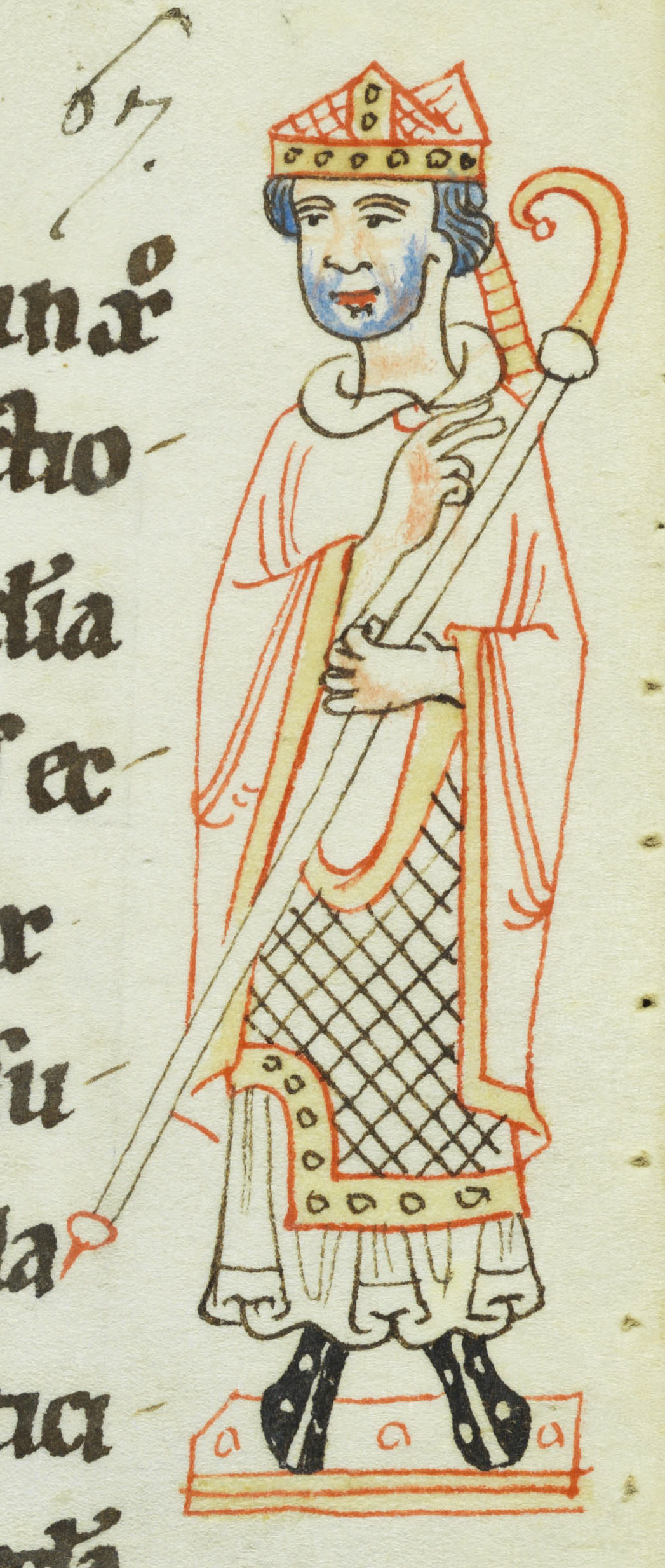
A drawing of Konrad from the cartulary of Weissenau Abbey

Konrad von Tegerfelden (died 19 February 1233) was the bishop of Constance (as Konrad II) from 1208 until his death. He belonged to the noble Tegerfelden family, being the son of Luitpold II and Hedwig.

Konrad is first attested in 1176 as a canon of Constance Cathedral. He was evidently educated there. From 1200 he was the provost and in 1208 he was elected bishop, although he was not consecrated until 1210. In 1209, he accompanied King Otto IV of Germany on his expedition to Rome to be crowned emperor. In 1212, the citizens of Constance forced him to open the city to Frederick of Sicily, Otto's rival for the German crown. For its support, the city obtained privileges from Frederick at the expense of episcopal authority. Nonetheless, Konrad was a frequent visitor at Frederick's court.

Konrad attended the Fourth Lateran Council in 1215 and held his own diocesan synods in 1216 and 1221. He divided his diocese into deaneries.
