= House of Hachberg-Sausenberg =

House of Hachberg-Sausenberg (Hachberg-Susenberg)
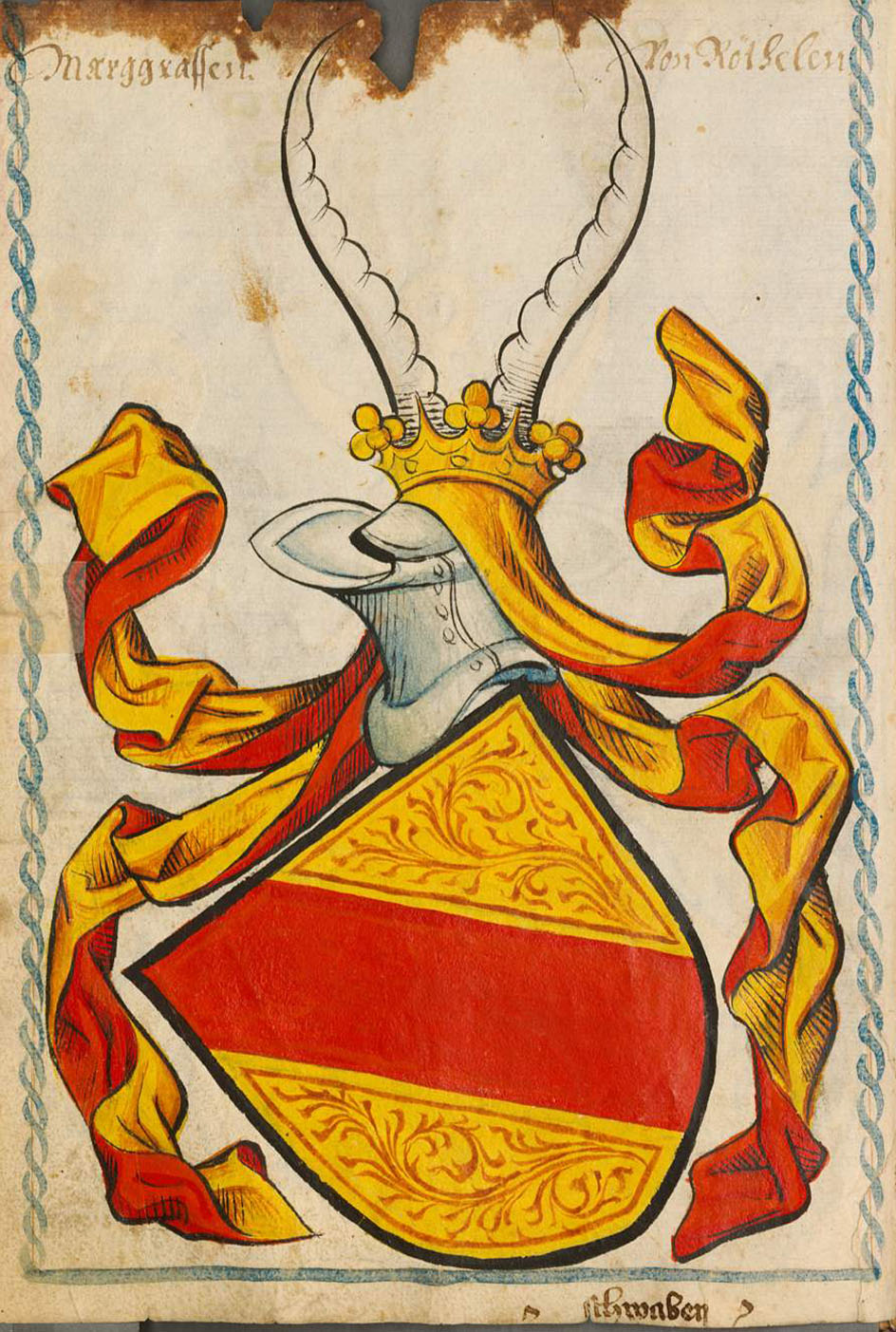
- Coat-of-arms of Baden-Hachberg-Sausenberg

The House of Hachberg-Sausenberg (medieval: House of Hachberg-Susenberg) was a German royal family that was first documented in 1306 as carve-out from the House of Baden-Hachberg, when Henry III. and his brother Rudolf I. shared the heritage of their father Henry II.

The family maintained an own territory in Baden within the Holy Roman Empire of the German Nation from 1306 until 1503. The house was historically related to the royal House of Zähringen.

The last Margrave was Philip of Hachberg-Sausenberg, who died without sons in 1503. His daughter Johanna of Hachberg-Sausenberg succeeded him as Countess of Neuchâtel, while the Landgraviate of Sausenberg, the lordship of Badenweiler, the lordship of Rötteln and Schopfheim went to Margrave Christopher I of Baden.

== Family Name ==
Many medieval documents and sources state the name of the family as Hachberg-Susenberg. The name Susenberg was related to the prevailing medieval Alemannic dialect, which spelled and pronounced the letters "au" (as in Haus) as "u" (as in "Huus"). The current spelling Sausenberg, which is used in today's Standard German literature, has not been used in official medieval documents.

== Notable Family Members ==
- Rudolf I, Margrave of Hachberg-Sausenberg (died 1313)
- Otto I, Margrave of Hachberg-Sausenberg (1302–1384)
- Rudolf II, Margrave of Hachberg-Sausenberg (1301–1352)
- Philip of Hachberg-Sausenberg (1454–1503), last Margrave of Hachberg-Sausenberg.
