= Charles d'Orléans de Rothelin =

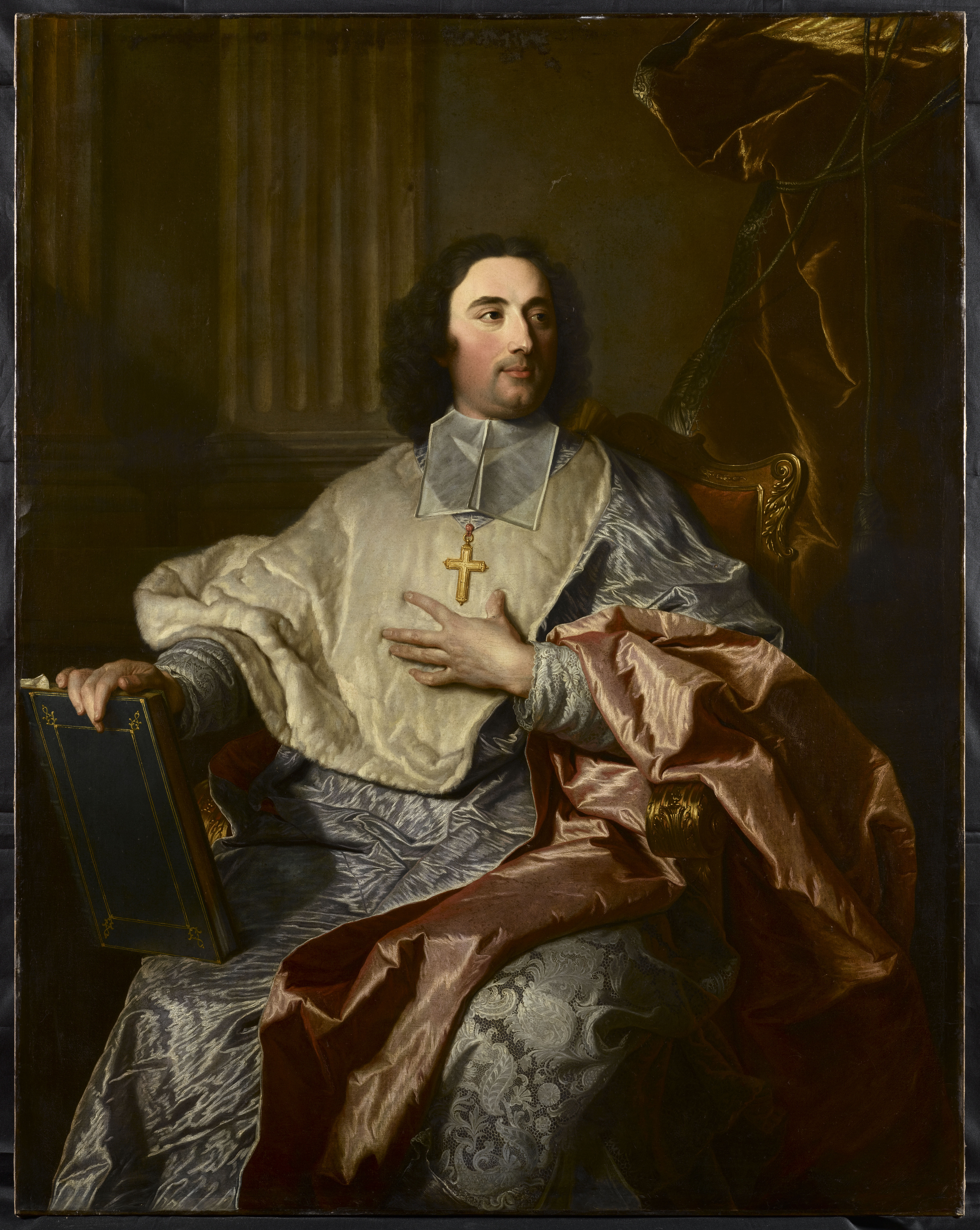

Charles d'Orléans de Rothelin (5 August 1691, in Paris – 17 July 1744) was a French churchman, writer, scholar, numismatist and theologian.

== Biohraphy ==
Born as the second son of Henri II d'Orléans, Marquis de Rothelin, and Gabrielle Éléonore de Montault. Charles belonged to an illegitimate cadet branch of the Dukes of Orléans-Longueville, whose descendants were known as d'Orléans-Rothelin. Through his mother, he was a grandson of Philippe II de Montaut-Bénac, Duc de Navailles and Marshal of France.

A descendant of Jean de Dunois, he was held to be one of the wisest bibliophiles of his time and owned an important cabinet of medals. He wrote Observations et détails sur la collection des grands et des petits voyages (1742) and was elected to the Académie française in 1728.
