= Rötteln Castle =

Castle ruins in Lörrach, Germany

Coordinates: 47°38′18″N 07°40′05″E

Rötteln Castle (Burg Rötteln)
- Lörrach, Baden-Württemberg, Germany
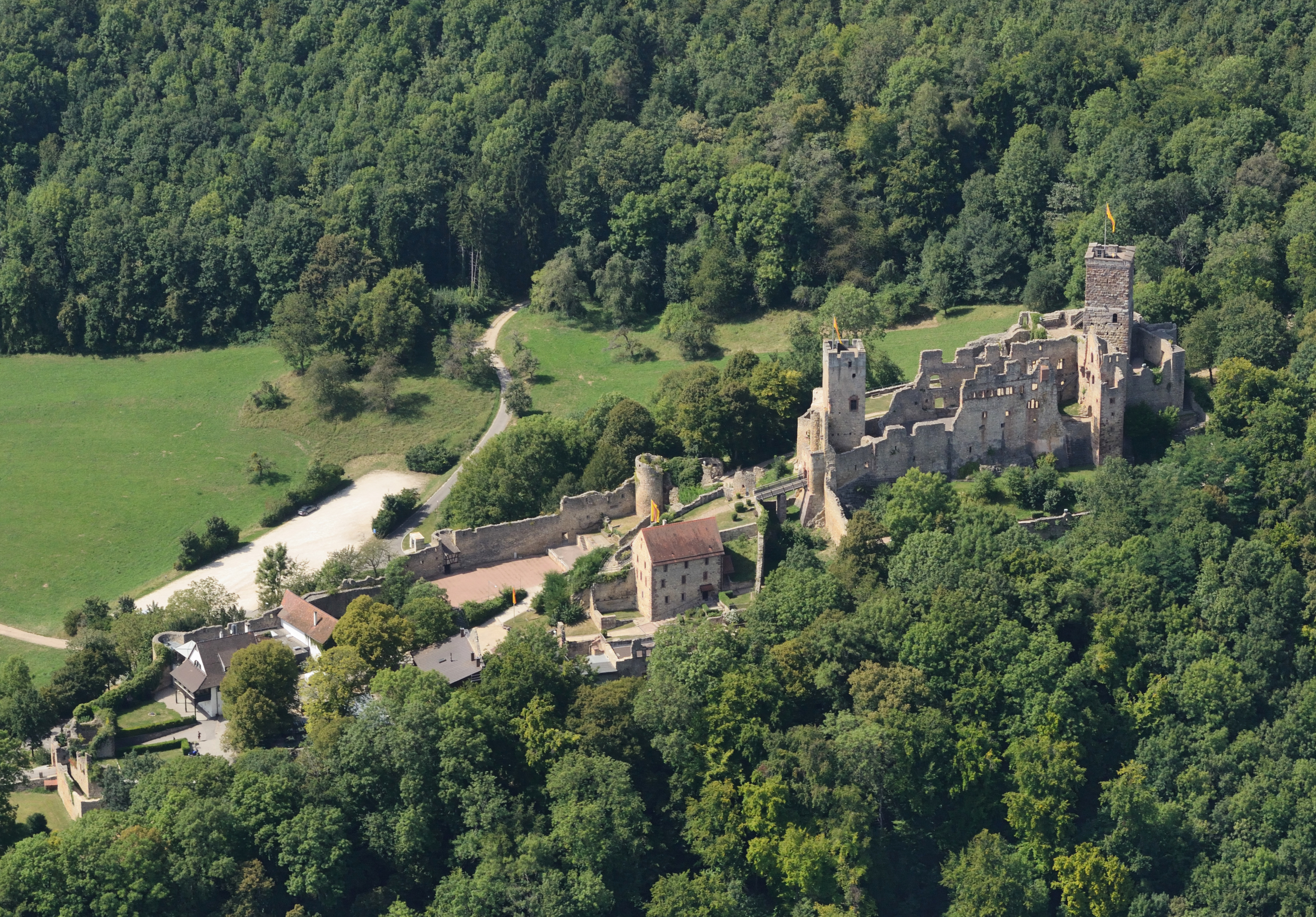
- Aerial view at Rötteln Castle

Site information
- Type: Castle
- Owner: Government of Baden-Württemberg
- Open to the public: March–October
- Condition: Ruins, partly conserved

Site history
- Built: c. 11th century
- Built by: Lords of Rötteln
- In use: 11th century – 1678
- Materials: Stone (11th century architecture)
- Demolished: 29 June 1678
- Battles/wars: Thirty Years War; Franco-Dutch War
- Events: 1356 Basel earthquake

Rötteln Castle (German: Burg Rötteln), located above the Lörrach suburb of Haagen, lies in the extreme southwest corner of the German state of Baden-Württemberg, just 10 kilometres (6 miles) north-east of the Swiss City of Basel. The fortification was one of the most powerful in the southwest, and today, it is the third largest castle ruin in Baden.

The castle remains are located on a prominent wooded hill 422 metres (1,385 feet) above sea level. The keep lies on a spur projecting from the steep-sided east side of the lower Wiese valley.

== History ==
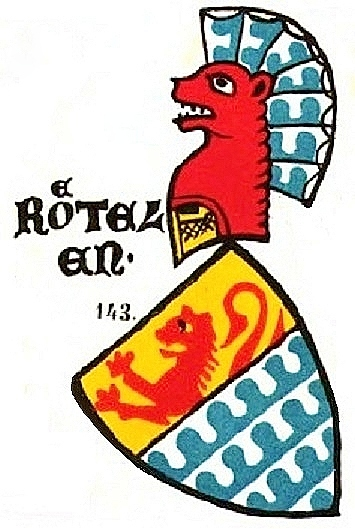
Coat of arms of the lords of Rötteln

=== The era of the lords of Rötteln, 1102–1316 ===
The castle has probably existed since the beginning of the 11th century. The first documented mention of a lord of Rötteln, one Dietrich von Rötteln, the bailiff of St. Albans near Basel, is 1102. This year is also considered the date of the founding of the city of Lörrach. In 1204 Dietrich III of Rötteln died, having amassed a large holding in the Wiese valley. His sons held high offices; Walter I von Rötteln was the Kapitular (a priest who is authorized to say the mass in a cathedral and perform other duties of a bishop) of Konstanz and Basel,

Luithold I von Rötteln was the bishop of Basel, Konrad I von Rötteln was the founder of the city of Schopfheim, which was important to the later formation of the Markgräflerland. The first documented mention of the castle itself is from the year 1259.

=== The era of the Margraves of Hachberg-Sausenberg, 1316–1503 ===
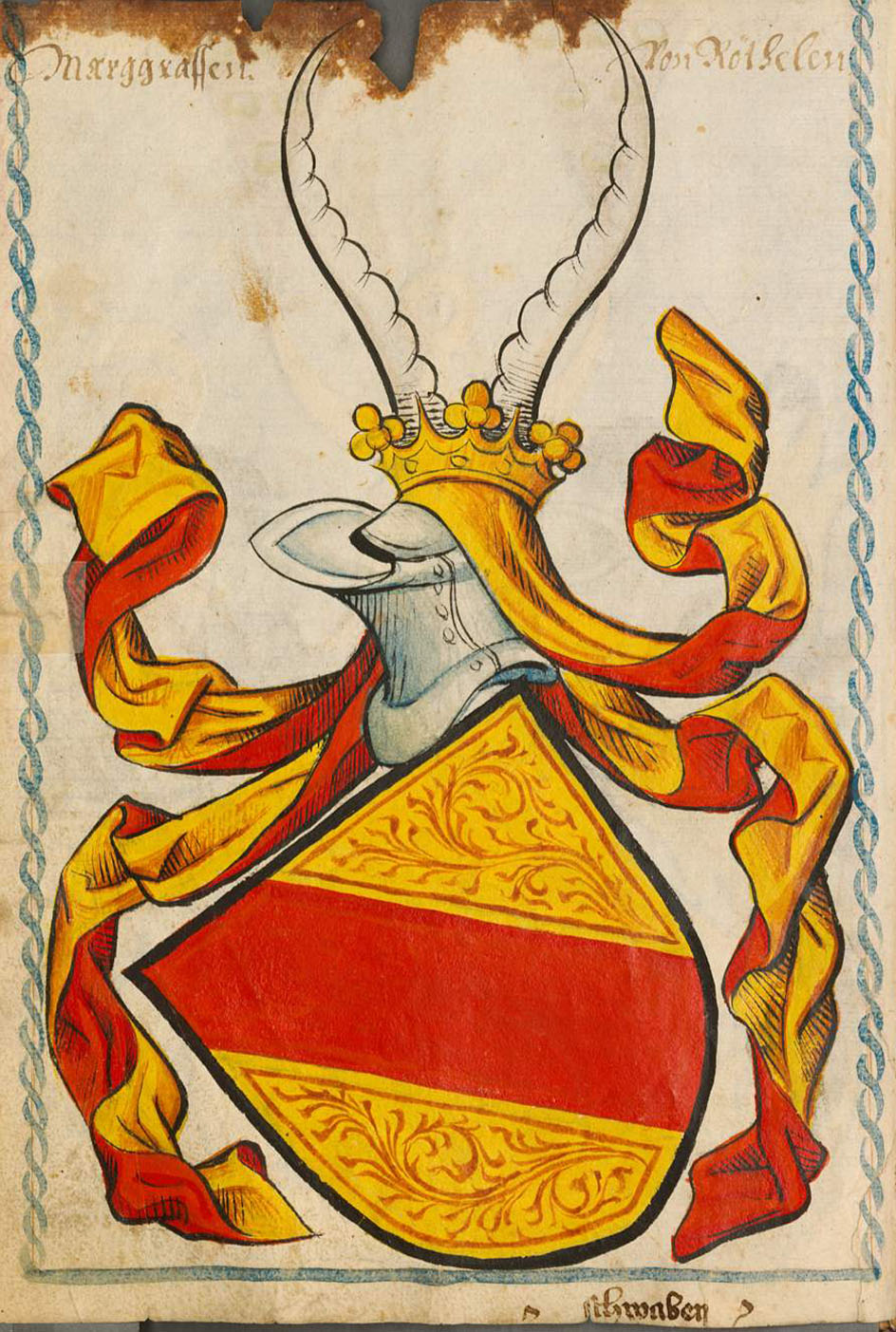
Coat of arms of the Margraves of Hachberg-Sausenberg

Luithold II von Rötteln, the last male of his line, gave the lordship of Rötteln to the Margrave Rudolf I of Hachberg-Sausenberg and his heiress Agnes von Rötteln in the year 1311. As a result, the Margrave of Hachberg-Sausenberg also became lord of the former domain of Rötteln. The Margrave then moved from Sausenburg Castle to Rötteln Castle to more easily administer his new domain and appointed a bailiff to oversee Sausenburg.

Luithold II von Rötteln died on 19 May 1316, and the passing of Rötteln to Hachberg-Sausenburg was an important step in the eventual formation of the Markgräflerland. In 1332, the castle was besieged by the people of Basel because the Margrave Rudolf II stabbed the mayor of Basel during an argument. The conflict was resolved at the last moment through an agreement to settle the argument. Arrowheads, crossbow bolts, and other finds near the castle attest to this siege.

The Basel earthquake of 1356 destroyed large portions of the city and the castle suffered severe damage.

In 1444, the domain of Badenweiler passed from the last Count of Freiburg, John, to the son of Margrave Wilhelm, Rudolf IV von Hachberg-Sausenberg. The combination of the three dominions, Rötteln, Sausenburg, and Badenweiler formed the foundation of the Markgräflerland.

During the reign of Rudolf IV (1441-1487) the castle had its heyday. At the court of Duke Philip the Good of Burgundy he had risen to high dignity. In 1454 the Duke was his guest on Rötteln castle. The unique splendor of the Burgundy court inspired the Margrave. Around 1470 the palace was expanded and architecturally enhanced. In 1474 a visitor reported that tapestries based on the Burgundian model were produced on the castle.

=== The era of the Margraves of Baden, 1503–1678 ===
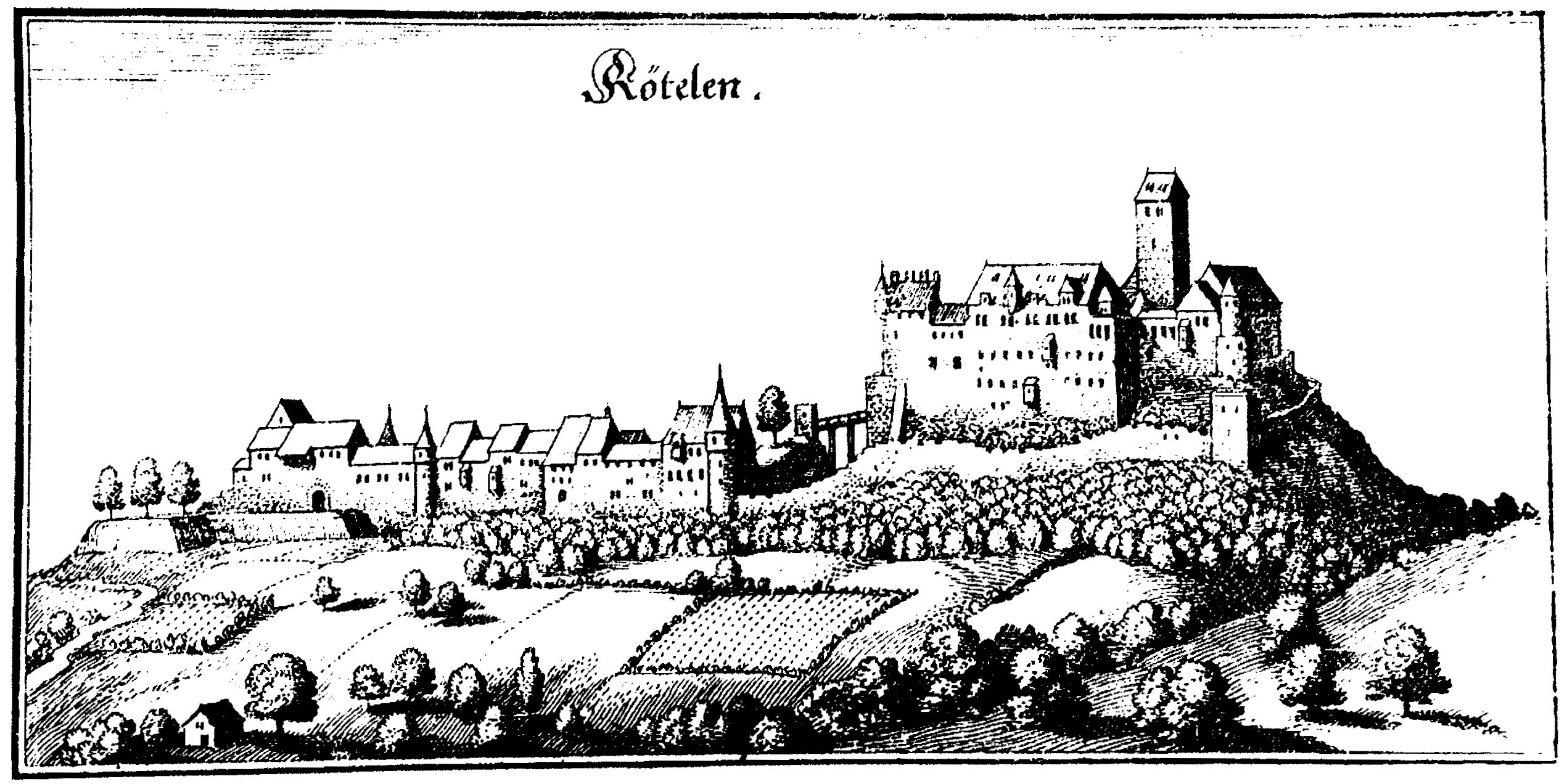
Rötteln Castle as depicted in 1643

In 1503 Philip of Hachberg-Sausenberg died and based on an agreement on reciprocal inheritance Philips lands in the Breisgau - including Rötteln castle – came in the hands of the Margrave of Baden. During the German Peasants' War (1525) revolting peasants briefly took possession of the castle but do not damage this place.

During the Thirty Years War the castle was affected in the years 1633–1638. In May 1633 Imperial forces led by Ernesto Montecuccoli took possession of the castle, which belonged to the Protestant Frederick V of Baden-Durlach an ally of the Swedish King Gustavus Adolphus of Sweden. Montecuccoli was supported by Herman Fortunatus a member of the catholic branch of the House of Baden. Two months later Swedish-Protestant army headed by Otto Louis of Salm-Kyrburg-Mörchingen reconquered Rötteln Castle. Following the Battle of Nördlingen (1634) the Swedish were forced to withdraw their garrison and were replaced later on by an Imperial garrison again. Right after the Battle of Rheinfelden in March 1638 the French-allied mercenary army led by Bernhard of Saxe-Weimar conquered the castle whereby causing severe damages.

The Franco-Dutch War (1672–1678) affected the Breisgau-region in the last phase when François de Créquy a Marshall of the French King Louis XIV conquered Freiburg im Breisgau at the end of 1677. Based on the fortifications of Freiburg and Breisach Créquy raided this region in the following year and tried to take over the fortified city of Rheinfelden. On the road to Rheinfelden a detachment of his army attacked Rötteln by using kartouwen and the Imperial garrison surrendered after a short time on 29 June 1678. Afterwards the French troops burned down the castle as they have done it this year with many castles and villages in the region – in fact Créquy followed a scorched-earth policy.

The castle ruins were thereafter used as a source of building stone (quarry). Further damages were caused by nature.

=== Restoration and maintenance ===
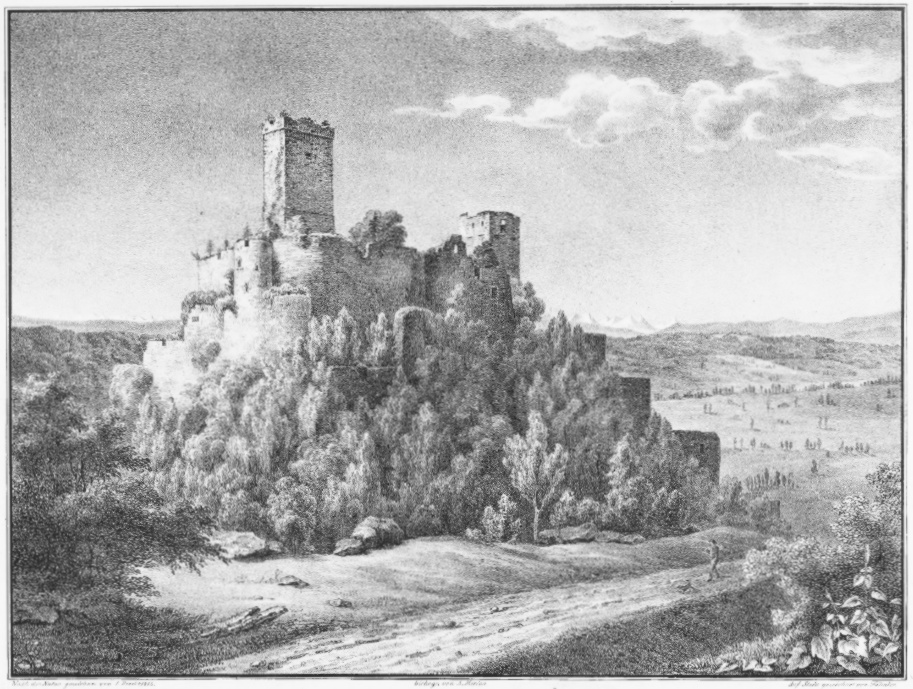
Rötteln Castle around 1828

The Black Forest Society of Baden (Schwarzwaldverein) began to survey the ruins in 1884 in order to preserve them. Since 1926, this has been the concern of the Röttelnbund e.V. club based in Lörrach-Haagen. Today the ruins have been restored to approximately their condition after the destruction in 1678.

== Location ==
The site of the castle extends from northwest to southwest over a distance of almost 300 metres (980 ft). The widely spread castle can be roughly divided into the fore-castle and upper castle. To the west, a bastion-like point extends for the placement of light artillery. Passage from the fore-castle to the upper castle is by means of a drawbridge. The upper castle, with its powerful keep, is the oldest part of the castle. Archaeological finds from the castle and grounds are on display in the museum located in the courtyard of the castle.

=== The Kapf, the bastion and the south gate ===
The free place called Kapf in front of the entrance to the south gate served as a meeting place for the regional court—the court of appeals for the village courts. The provincial governor had the presidency. He was assisted by the landschreiber (deputy of the provincial governor and first law officer) and seven free men as judges. The seven came from respected families of the territorial estates (an early democratic institution with some rights of self-government). Death sentences pronounced by the regional court were promptly executed on the Kapf. After 1503, the Margraves of Baden converted the Kapf into a bastion formed as a star-shaped redoubt. On French orders, the bastion had to be dragged (destroyed) in January 1689. The stones were used by the French to build their fortress at Huningue (on the left bank of the river Rhein just before the city of Basel).

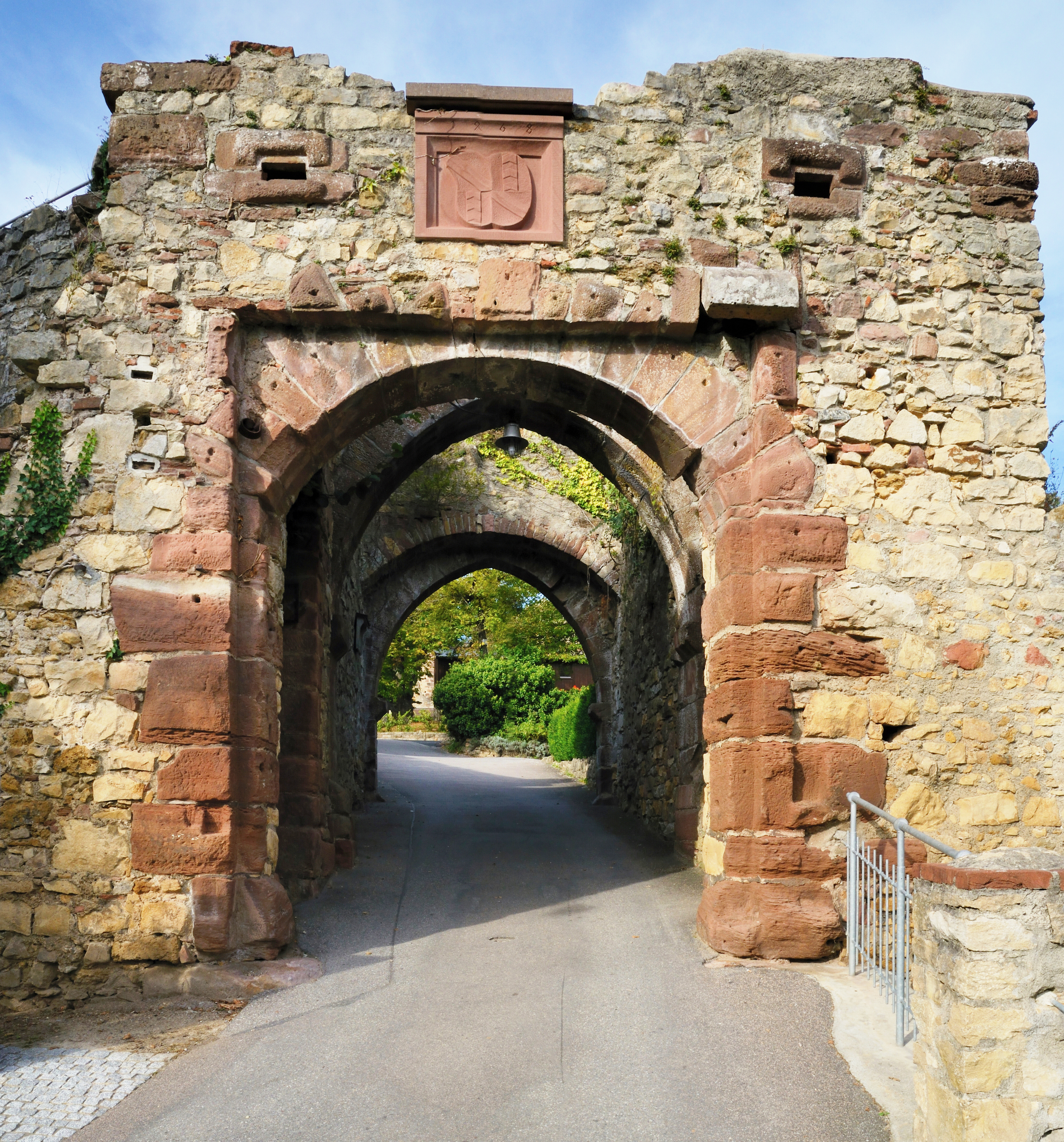
South gate of Rötteln castle

The outer bailey is entered via the south gate. The deeply staggered gatehouse consisting of three gates was also a tower. The apex of the portal contains a slab with the coat of arms of the builder-owner, Marquis Rudolf IV of Hachberg-Sausenberg (today just a copy). It is marked with the date 1468. The original of the coat of arms and the court table of the Kapf are exhibited in the Dreiländermuseum in Lörrach.

=== The outer bailey ===
The outer bailey or lower castle was developed in the 14th and 15th centuries, though it had historically been a farmstead belonging to the castle. The outer bailey was surrounded by a high ring wall with flanking towers. On the west side, the defense system is well preserved. The area inside the wall was densely built with a broad lane halfway through. The overall picture of the outer bailey was characterized by facilities for the main functions of the place - agriculture, administration and military garrison. The farmstead, storage buildings, and lodgings for maids, servants, craftsmen and their families made a fortified village out of the outer bailey.

A 1377 document mentions an innkeeper living in the outer bailey. The inhabitants of the castle, artisans, peasants and travelers were invited to make a stop at the inn. The café on the grounds of the castle is a modern building but it is probably situated on the site of the medieval inn.

To the east, on the way to the inner bailey, there is the landschreiberei that was the most important institution of the administration of the Marquis of Baden. The landschreiberei housed the office and the archive and local officers kept in touch with the remote residence in Durlach (today Karlsruhe-Durlach). The striking four-story building dates back to the late Middle Ages. It was rebuilt by the Röttelnbund in 1985 and now houses event locations, the archive and museum, as well as the kiosk in the entrance area.

=== Access to the inner bailey (upper castle) ===
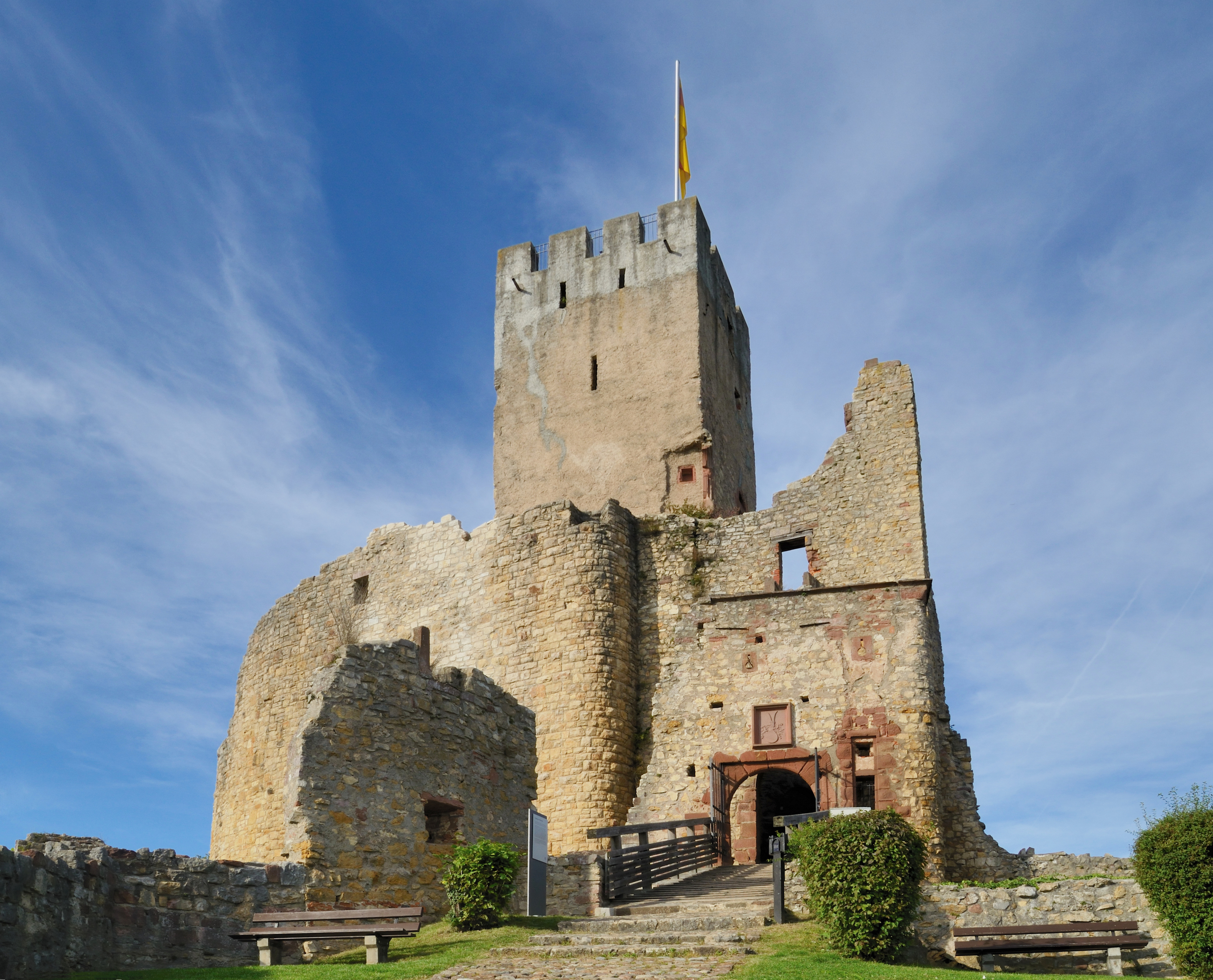
Gate of the inner bailey of Rötteln castle

There is no other castle in the surrounding area in which the sophisticated access technology has been preserved as visibly. Since the upper or main castle is the heart of the whole system, it was specially protected. The upper castle is enclosed by a curtain wall with a defense walk. The upper castle features a moat which was created by removing the bedrock in between the inner and outer bailey. The wooden bridge to cross the moat is located at the only passage through the curtain wall.

At one time the moat was very deep and the connection between the lower and the upper castle was provided by a drawbridge. The old support pillars of the drawbridge carry the current steel bridge.

In addition to the main gate, the narrow manhole (today closed by a fence) grants access to individuals. This access was also fortified by a drawbridge. Above the apex of the main gate there is a sandstone slab sculpted with the coat of arms of the builders and powerful owners of the castle—the Margraves of Hachberg-Sausenberg.

Behind the main gate there are huge windowless walls. To enter the inner bailey of the upper castle, the three-gate safety installation must be passed. The gate defense tower, named Giller rises from the curtain wall on the left.

=== Cellar under the manor house ===
A castle is not only the ancestral home of a noble family and a center of power, but also the heart of an economic enterprise. From here, the widely scattered property was operated and managed. The alimentation and health of the numerous inhabitants of the castle had to be ensured even in the case of a long-lasting siege. Adequate storage was therefore indispensable. Large cellar rooms for storage were built within the castle.

Under the old building or manor house is a large wine cellar with a vault. Originally, the cellar had a simple wood-beamed ceiling. In the second half of the 14th century, Margrave Rudolf III carried out major reconstruction work on the manor house. It was probably at this time that the wooden ceiling of the cellar was replaced by a barrel vault—a series of arches placed side by side to form a barrel roof.

=== Giller and cistern ===
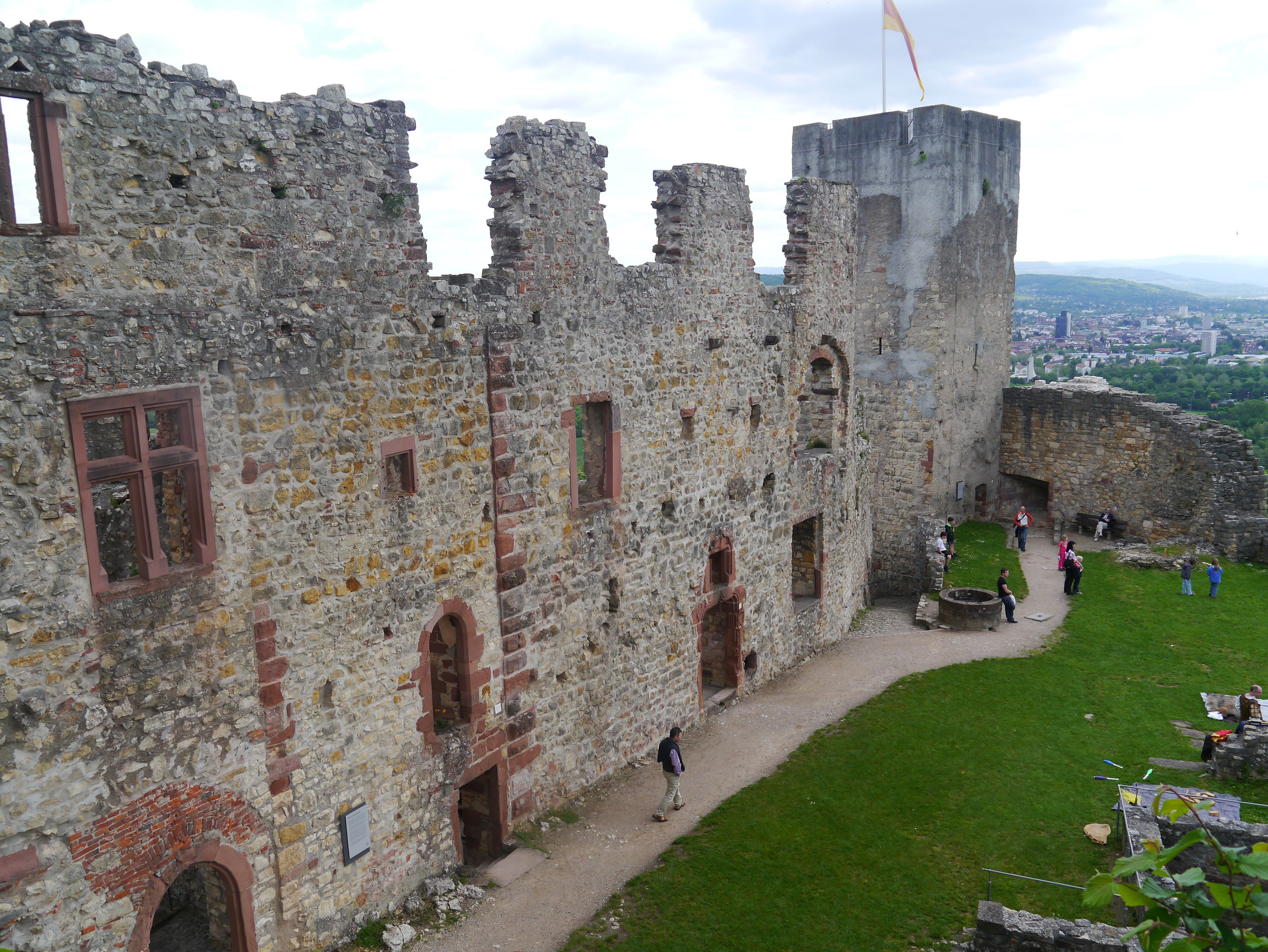
The front of the palas, the mouth of the cistern, and the tower named Giller

The gate defense tower, Giller, secured the only entrance to the upper castle especially before the expansion of the outer ward (lower castle). At times, it also served as a prison tower; inside, parts of jougs (iron collar), footcuffs, handcuffs, and stone weights have been found.

Originally, the Giller was shorter but during reconstruction work in 1926, a storey with battlements made of concrete was added.

A deep castle well was mentioned in 1420 that refer to a cistern. Since the water table in the area is deep and difficult to get to, surface water was collected in the cistern.

Cisterns of this kind are rare in southern Germany. The 8-to-10-metre-deep (26 to 33 ft) shaft was surrounded by a sheath of gravel and sand and sealed with a clay layer to the outside. Incoming surface water seeped through the filter material into the interior of the shaft and into the cistern. The water in the cistern had an exceptionally good quality.

=== Palas (manor house) and castle chapel ===
The palas, or manor house, was the residence of the ruler and a prestigious building. It was built in three phases: the oldest part of the building is the southern, then the north side of the building was built, and, last, the portion of the building and close to the keep was constructed.

The palas has three storeys, but only the top floor went through all three phases of construction. It is clearly visible that the initial building was extended once and then again in later years.

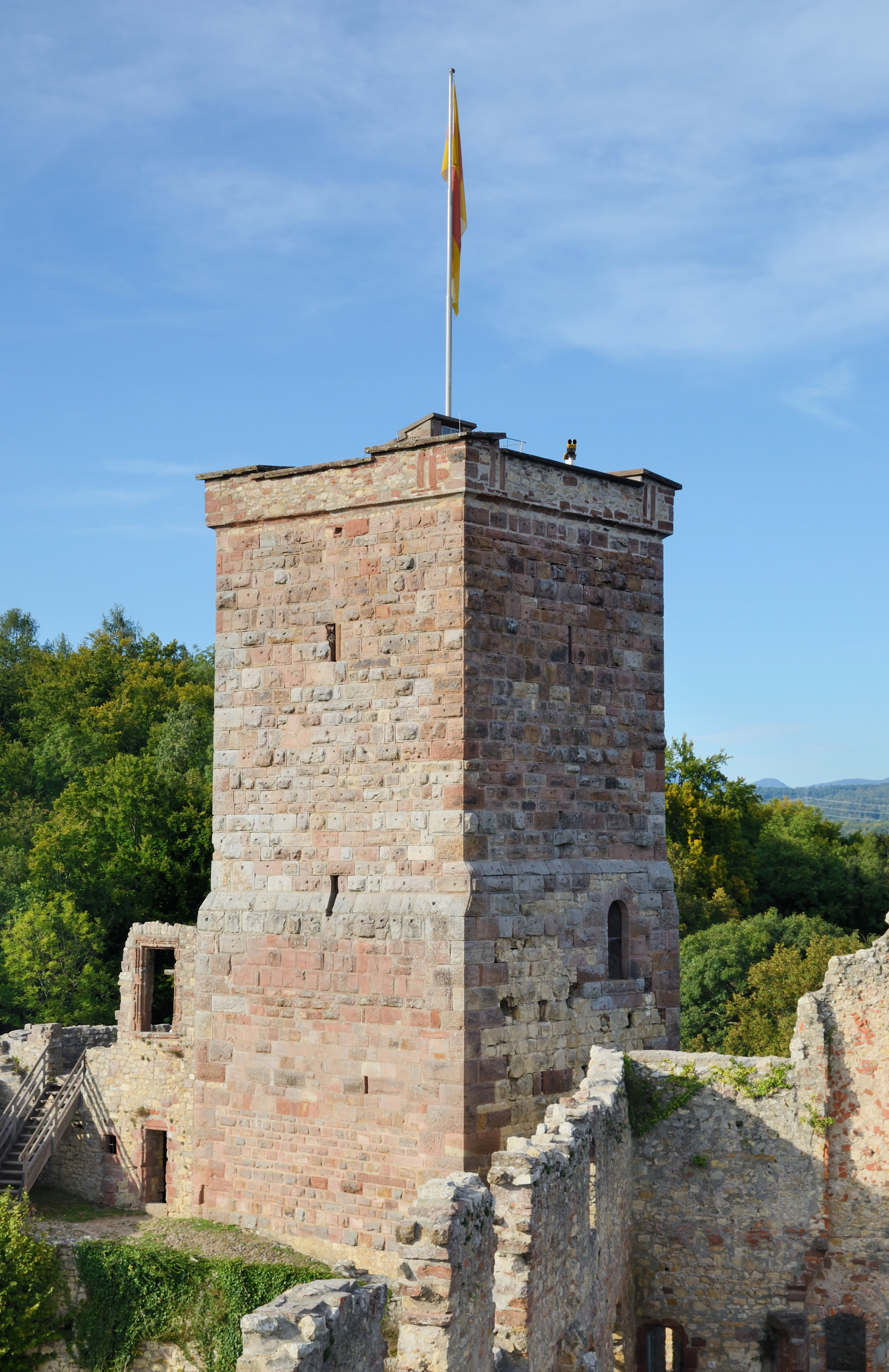
The bergfried of Rötteln Castle

The oldest part of the building dates back to the time of the noble lords of Rötteln in the 13th century. The downstairs area contains a knights' hall which was used for social events. Above the knights' hall were the living and sleeping areas. The second oldest portion of the building housed the kitchen. The newest part of the palas was built under the reign of Margrave Philip of Hachberg-Sausenberg (1454–1503). The keystone of the entrance portal is decorated with the coat of arms of the Margrave and his wife Maria of Savoy (1455–1511).

The spacious ballroom occupied the entire area of the top floor. There are benches in the niches of its large windows. The embrasure of windows and portals of the newest construction show exceptionally fine designs. They bear witness to the Margrave's, who belonged to the Burgundians and later on to the French court, demanding need for representation. The new building was comfortable: there were numerous smaller rooms that were heated with cocklestoves and toilet facilities on the eastern exterior wall.

The chapel of St. Mary (consecrated 1504) on the north side of the bailey was an elongated hall with two columns in the center axis that supported a ribbed vaulting in late Gothic style. It is assumed that the burial place of Margrave Rudolf IV (death 1487) is within the chapel.

=== The keep (Bergfried) ===
The Bergfried, or keep, stands at the highest point of the castle. Its construction dates back to the early days of the castle among the free nobles of Rötteln but may be older. The original entrance is located at the south side on the third storey of the tower. It was only accessible via ladders or a wooden staircase. The current entrance is modern.

The Bergfried was a watchtower, a retreat for defense, and a prison tower. Along with the curtain wall and the neck ditch, the Bergfried formed the most important element in the defense system of the upper castle.

The prolonged construction period of the keep can be seen in the stones of the Bergfried—the stones and building technique change with increasing height. On the lower layers, the stone construction is remarkable and is found only in Romanesque churches of the area but for castles it is unique in the region of Baden.

The top of the Bergfried allows for a view of the whole castle, into the valley of the river Wiese, to the Black Forest, to the Swiss Jura and the Alsatian Vosges mountain range, and sometimes even the Bernese Alps.

== Furnishing and inventory ==
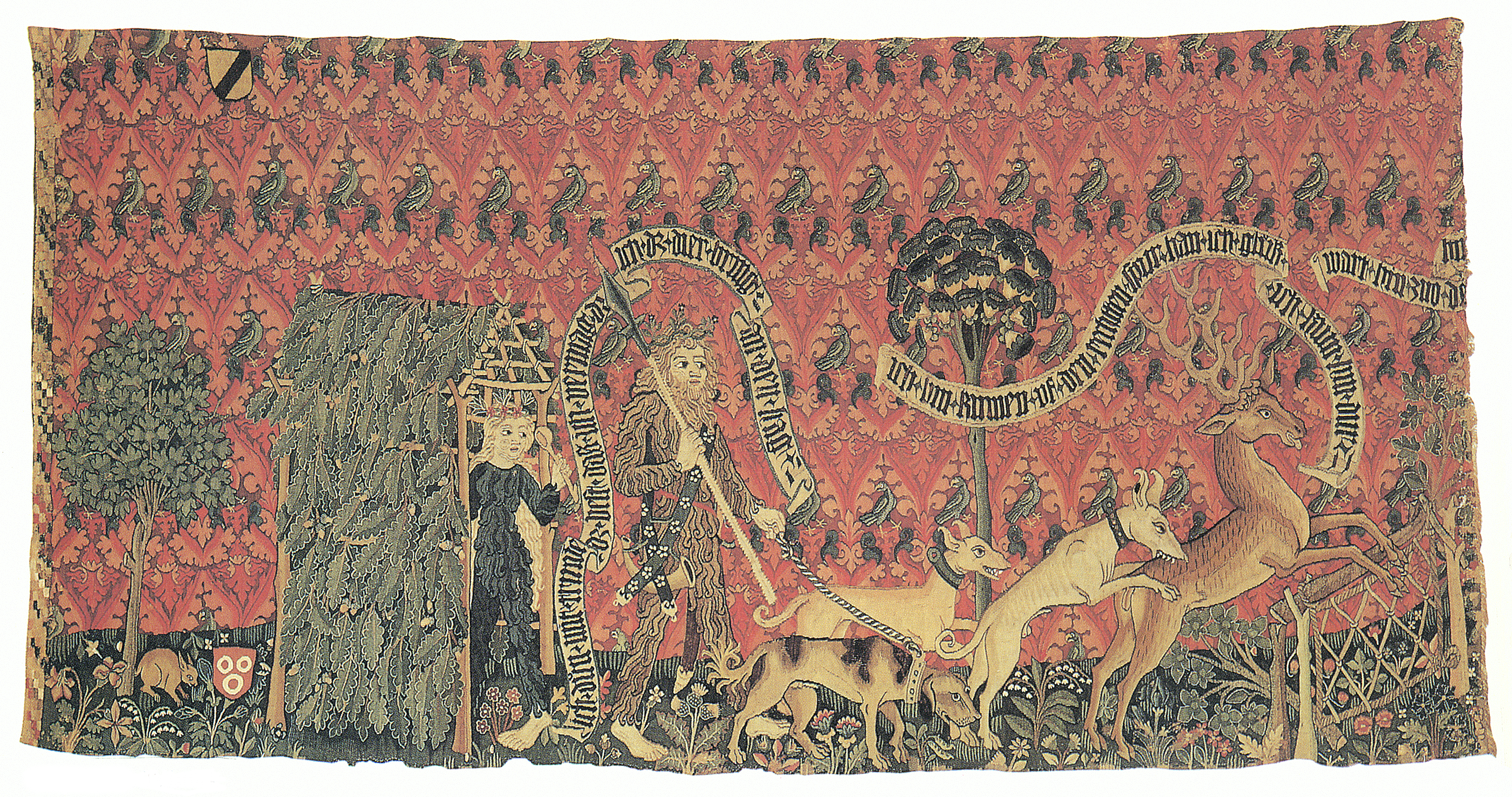
Left part of the so-called Flachsland-Teppich (Flachsland tapestry)

Due to the castle's former representative character, it is assumed that the interior was also decorated splendidly and expensively. Pilgrim Hans von Waltheim from Halle an der Saale, having visited the castle on 9 July 1474, marvelled at the tapestries in the cabinet and said that they had the most beautiful workmanship of pictures, of countenance, of clothing, of animals and flowers and other work, as if they lived.

The luxurious tapestries and fireplaces lead back to the large rooms, especially inside of the palas. The palas was difficult to heat and carpets were attached to the cold walls to create a warmth. Smaller rooms were panelled with wood.

Additional evidence of the sophisticated inventory can be seen in the stove tiles which are exhibited in the castle's museum and the Dreiländermuseum in Lörrach. In the 14th century, chimneys and fireplaces had large tiles to store heat and allowed more even and widespread heating. Some ovens were made of clay, but others were made of cast iron which could both absorb and emit heat faster. Rötteln Castle had been equipped with at least 10 to 15 masonry heaters. Many of them date back to the time of Rudolf IV and Philip who imported them from Burgundy and Romandy. Some tiles carry highly artistic ornaments and biblical scenes in relief.

Rötteln castle was equipped with workshops dedicated to the production of furniture and a known Burgundian tapestry craftsman produced tapestries there.

Many items have been found during restoration work—round shots, arrowheads and other either completely or partially preserved weapons, but also items of daily life such as harnesses, buttons, tools, desk bells and door locks. Findings and historic illustrations which show the castle's history are exhibited at the museum of the castle. The majority of the findings are exhibited at the Dreiländermuseum in Lörrach. These include tiles, glassware, fragments of tableware, tools, parts of weapons, pipes, a chessman, a judge's table along with an executioner's sword and different instruments of torture.

== Usage today ==
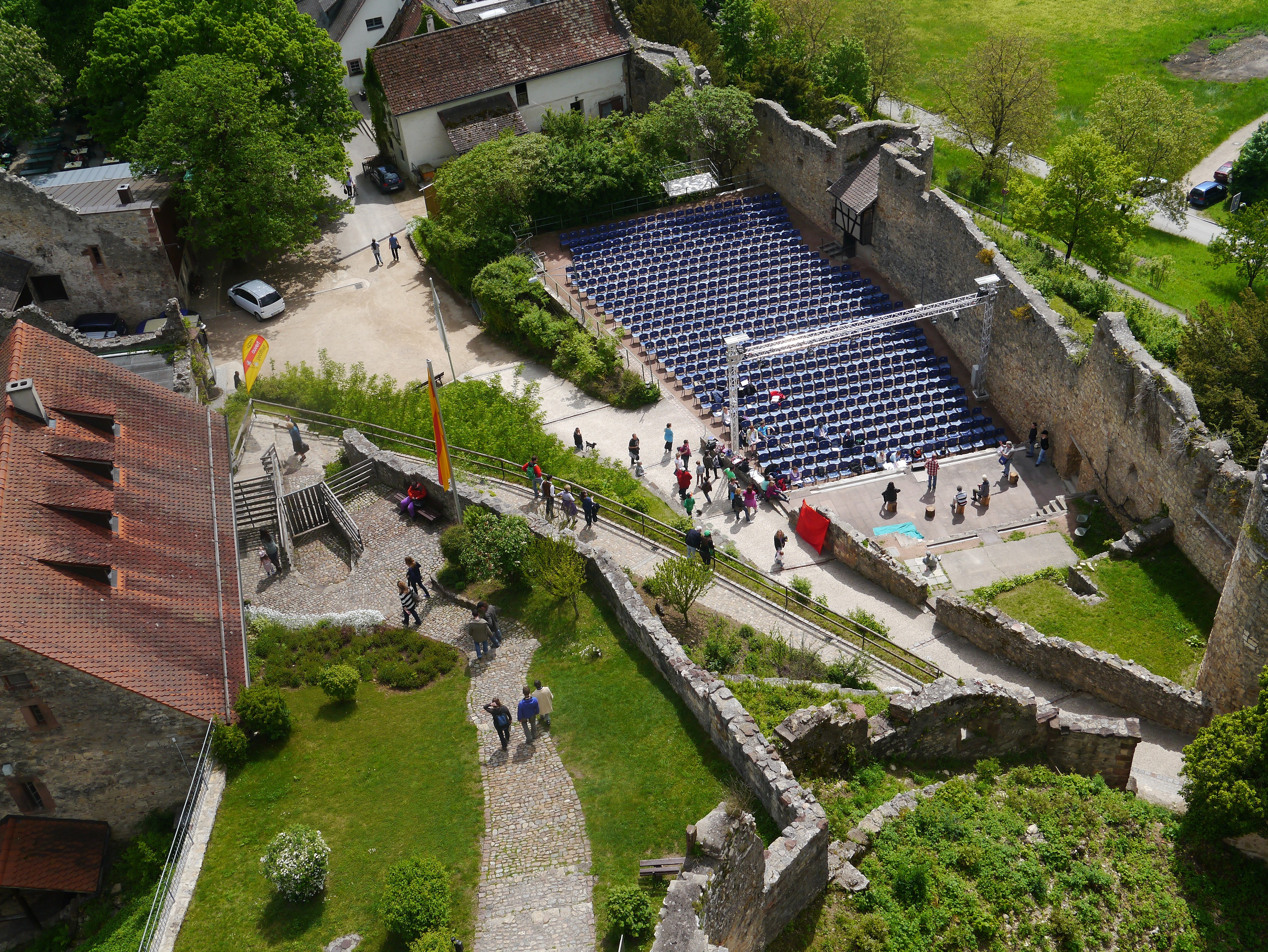
View on the outer bailey of Rötteln castle with the open air theatre

The castle ruin is open throughout the year and tours can be arranged in advance. While the lower castle can be visited anytime for free, the upper castle has different, seasonal hours. In addition to a museum in the reconstructed district offices, a tavern can be found inside the fortification. The castle is federal state-owned and is being maintained by the institution Staatliche Schlösser und Gärten Baden-Württemberg. Both the upkeep and the maintenance are taken care of by Röttelnbund e.V. The upper castle is visited by nearly 50,000 people annually. The tavern and the pub garden belong to the city of Lörrach and each space can be leased for events. Since December 2017, the city runs a café. The registry office of Lörrach operates a wedding hall within the reconstructed district offices. The Knechtstube (servant's parlour) can seat 25 people. Around 66 weddings take place there every year.

Since 1968, the society Burgfestspiele Rötteln performs classic plays on the outdoor stage in the outer bailey every year. Since 2007, another festival called Jazz auf der Burg (jazz at the castle) takes place and is supported by the Jazz-Club 56. In summer 2003, an open-air cinema was mounted.

Since 1938, the Rötteln Castle and surrounding area is acknowledged as a conservation area with the description: "very remarkable, large castle ruin within scenically excellent location and environment, especially arboretums, bushes, meadows, forest border".

== See also ==
- List of castles in Baden-Württemberg

== Bibliography ==
- Ralf Wagner et al. (Redaktion), Staatliche Schlösser und Gärten Baden-Württemberg (Herausgeber): Burg Rötteln : Herrschaft zwischen Basel und Frankreich. J. S. Klotz Verlagshaus. Neulingen 2020, ISBN 978-3-948424-60-2.
- Sven Schomann: Hagen (Lörrach, LÖ): Burg Rötteln. In: Alfons Zettler, Thomas Zotz (Hrsg.): Die Burgen im Mittelalterlichen Breisgau II. Südlicher Teil. Halbband A–K. Thorbecke, Ostfildern 2009, p. 220–243 ISBN 978-3-7995-7366-5.
- Jürgen Krüger: Burg Rötteln. Deutscher Kunstverlag München, Berlin 2006, ISBN 3-422-02049-7.
- Karl Seith: Die Burg Rötteln im Wandel ihrer Herrengeschlechter. In Das Markgräflerland, Heft 3 (1931/32), S. 3–35 (online)).
