= Sausenburg Castle =

Ruin in Baden-Württemberg, Germany

Coordinates: 47°44′16.25″N 07°41′19.91″E

Sausenburg
- Kandern, Baden-Württemberg, Germany
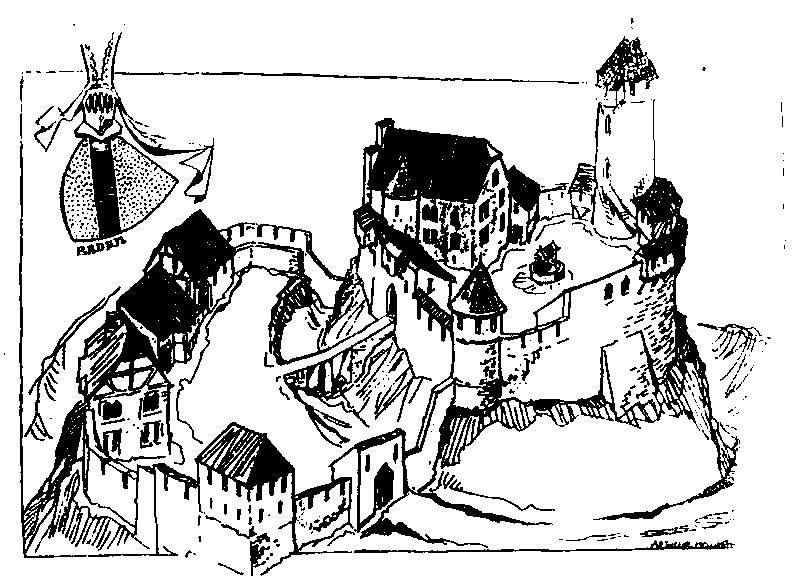
- An artist's rendition of the castle shortly after its completion

Site information
- Type: Castle
- Owner: Government of Baden-Württemberg
- Condition: Ruins survive

Site history
- Built: 1246
- Built by: Counts von Hachberg
- In use: 1246-1678
- Materials: Stone (13th century architecture)
- Demolished: 1678
- Battles/wars: Franco-Dutch War

Sausenburg Castle is a ruined German castle on the edge of the Black Forest, just north of the town of Kandern in Baden-Württemberg, between the villages of Sitzenkirch and Malsburg-Marzell. The castle was originally the stronghold of the lords of Sausenburg, and is built on a hill, 665 metres high, known as the Sausenberg.

== History ==
At the beginning of the 12th century, the area was given to the Benedictine monks of the Monastery of St Blaise. The counts of Hachberg acquired the property in 1232 from the monastery. They built the castle in order to protect the area and lived there from 1246. In 1306, the counts founded the Sausenberg dynasty. From that point on, they called themselves the Margraves of Hachberg-Sausenberg.

In 1315, Liuthold II of Roetteln, the last male member of his dynasty, bestowed Roetteln to the counts of Hachberg-Sausenberg. He died in 1316. The counts of Hachberg-Sausenberg moved to Rötteln Castle and established their advocates (vogts) on the Sausenberg.

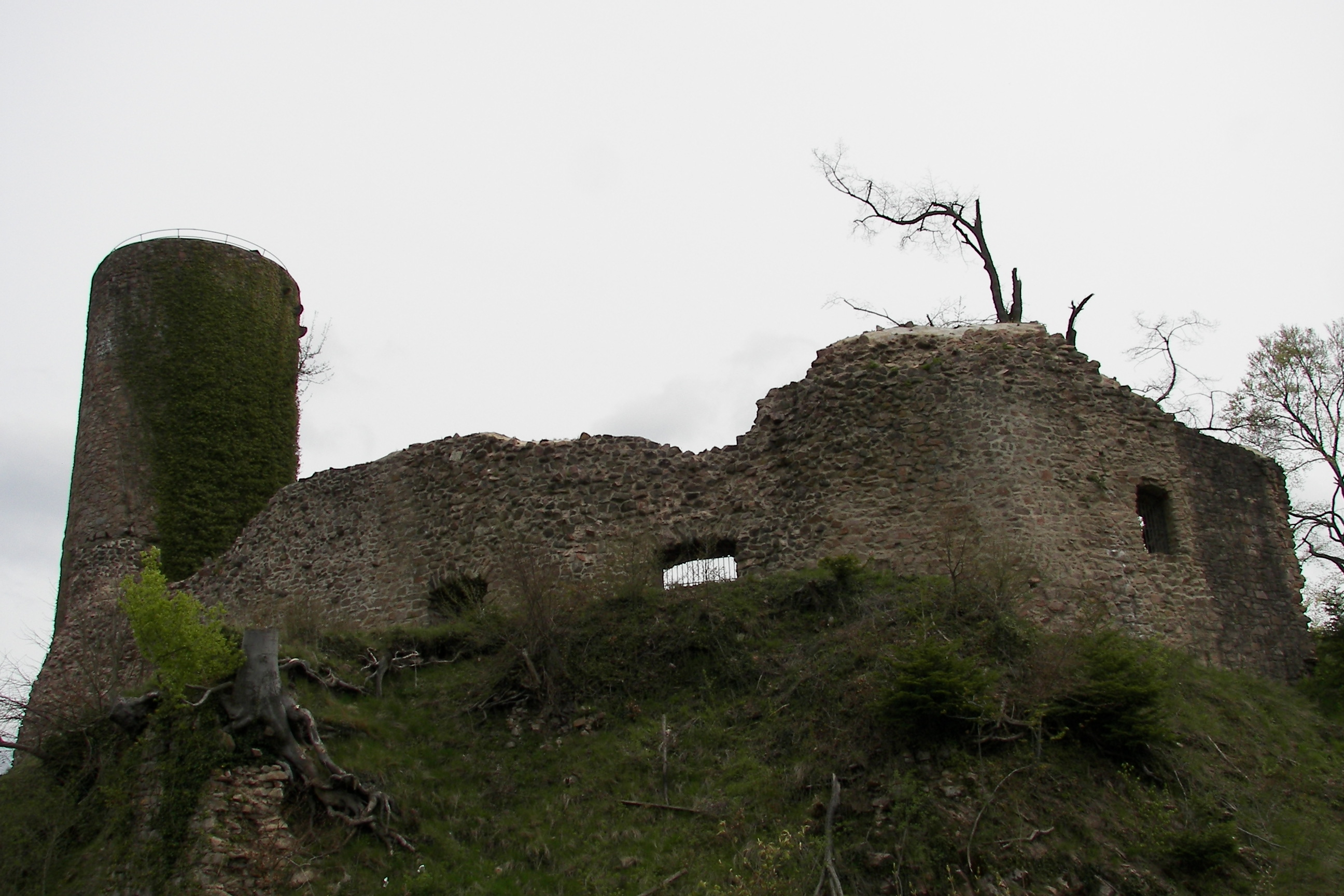
The ruins of Sausenburg Castle in spring

John, the last of the counts of Freiburg, bestowed his property Badenweiler to the margraves of Hachberg-Sausenberg in 1444; the merger of Badenweiler, Rötteln, and Sausenberg marked the beginning of the Markgräflerland.

In 1503, through inheritance, the Sausenburg and the Markgräflerland became part of the Margraviate of Baden. The castle was destroyed in 1678 during the Franco-Dutch War by the army of French Marshal de Créquy. At this point, medieval fortifications could not survive long against the advances in artillery and siege warfare.

Today an old circular rampart, a tower and several wall segments remain of the former castle.
