= Rötteln =

Coordinates: 47°38′N 7°40′E

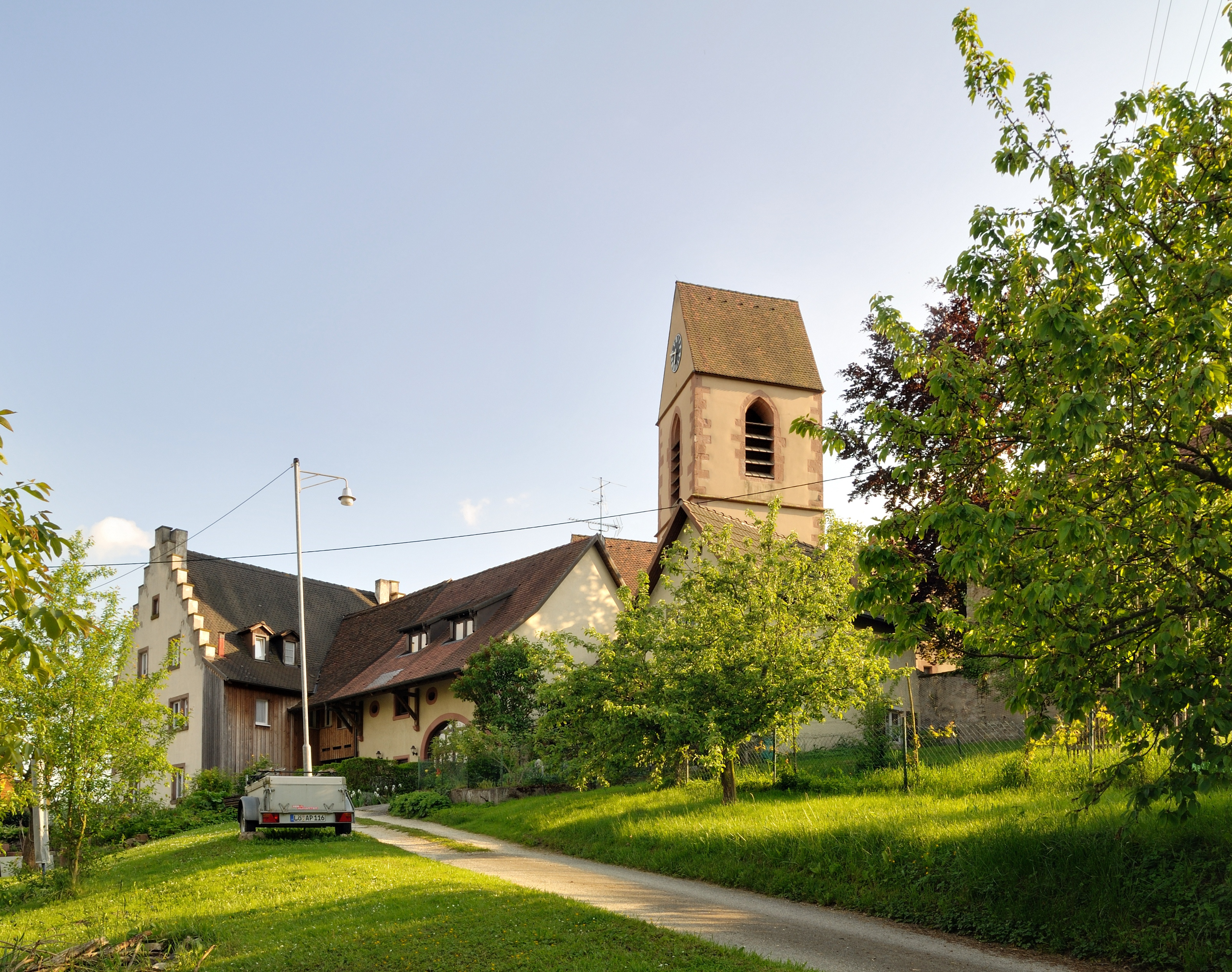
Lutheran Church in Rötteln

Rötteln (Old High German: Raudinleim) is a hamlet beneath the ruins of Rötteln Castle, which was once home to the Lords of Rötteln. Today it is part of the quarter of Haagen, in the city of Lörrach, Baden-Württemberg.

== History ==
The hamlet was established in the Middle Ages near the castle. In the old well-preserved village center is a church, which was mentioned for the first time on September 7, 751 as the “church at that place, which is called Raudinleim.” The charter is preserved in the archives of Abbey of St. Gallen. After the St. Gallus Church collapsed as a result of the Basel earthquake of 1356, Margrave Rudolf III ordered the construction of a new church, but it used the preserved parts of the Romanesque predecessor. The new larger church was built in Gothic style, and the church interior expanded with the Erhardus Chapel on the north side with reticulated vaulting and the George Chapel in the east to the left of the choir as a mortuary chapel for the family of the margrave. The new church was consecrated in 1401. The Rötteln Church and also Rötteln Castle are illuminated at night and thus are visible from a distance. The church was thoroughly restored from September 2004 to 2005.
