= Hugo von Montfort =

Austrian minstrel

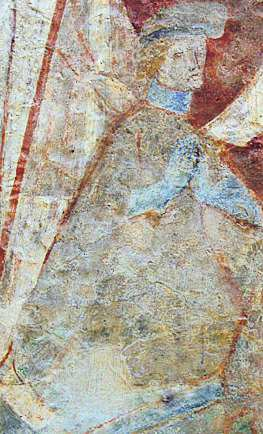
A fresco of the last court minnesinger, Hugo von Montfort, from Pfannberg Castle

Hugo von Montfort (1357 – 4 April 1423) was an Austrian minstrel of the Late Middle Ages.

== Life ==
Hugo VII was a scion of the comital house of Montfort at Bregenz, head of an old and influential Swabian family of nobles, holding numerous high administrative posts. By his mother Countess Ursula of Ferrette (Pfirt), he was related with the Austrian House of Habsburg. About 1373 he married the Styrian countess Margaret, granddaughter of Count Ulrich V of Pfannberg and widow of Count Hans of Cilli. With his wife's estates around Pfannberg in the Mur valley, he vastly increased the area controlled by the House of Montfort. Upon Margarte's death about 1395, he secondly married Countess Clementia of Toggenburg. In 1399 he also acquired Festenburg Castle in eastern Styria. In 1402 Hugo married, for the third time, the Bohemian noble Anna of Neuhaus, widow of the Styrian governor Hans of Stadeck.

As second-born son, he had prepared for an ecclesiastical career, but spent most of his adult life as a politician in the Habsburg service: as commander in chief of the ducal Austrian troops in Italy, as Hofmeister of Duke Leopold IV, as governor of Styria (1412–1415), and as Landvogt in the Thurgau, Aargau, and Black Forest regions of Further Austria. Hugo died aged 66 at Pfannberg and was buried in the parish church of Bruck an der Mur in Upper Styria.

== Works ==
Hugo wrote songs and Minnebrief rhymes, as well as political and didactic speeches. About 1402 he had a first manuscript of his works drawn up. Approximately 40 of his texts are preserved in an elaborate 1414 codex. Though still standing in the shadow of his famous contemporary Oswald von Wolkenstein, he is today considered one of the last important representatives of the German Minnesang.

== Photo gallery ==
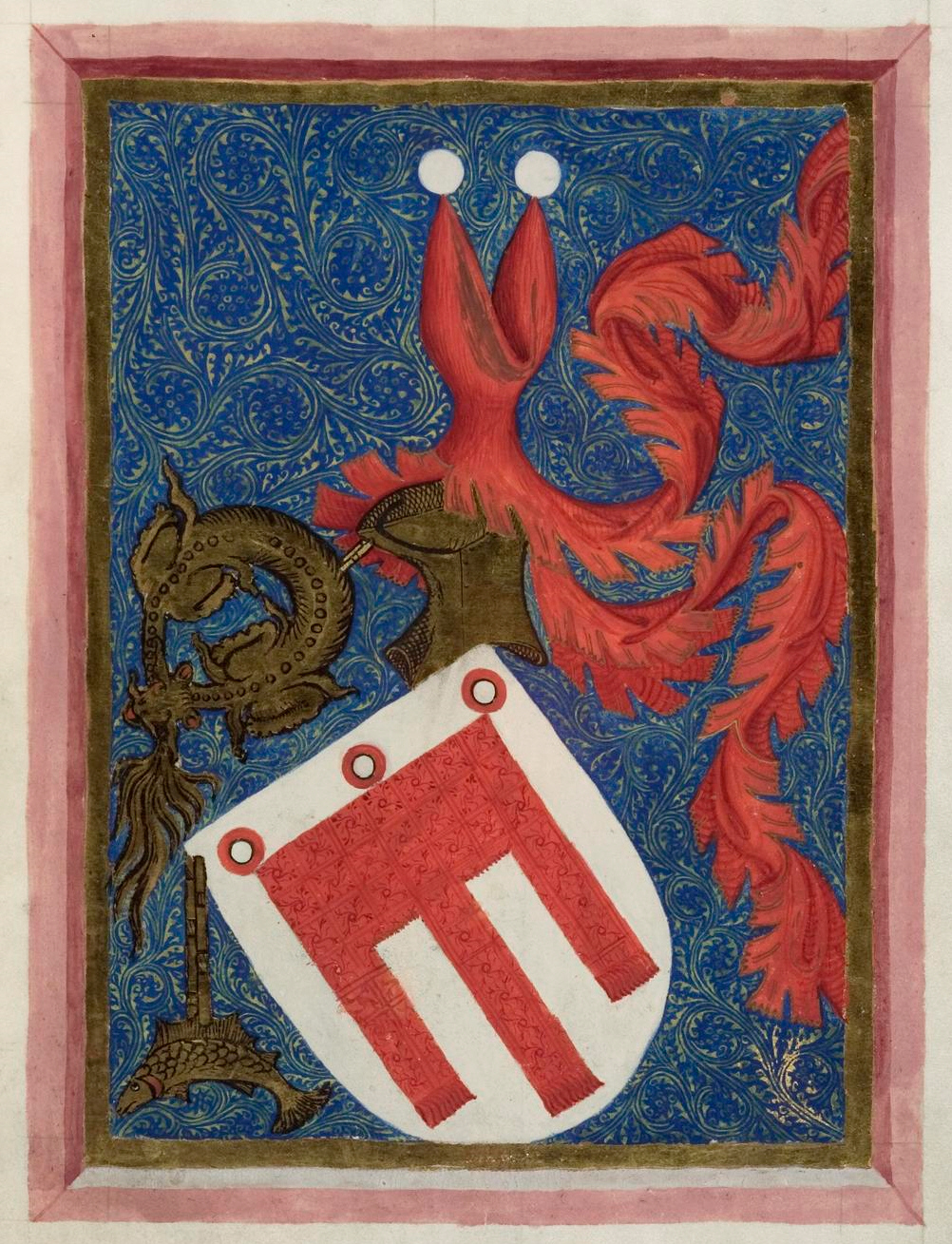
Montfort coat of arms, 1414 codex

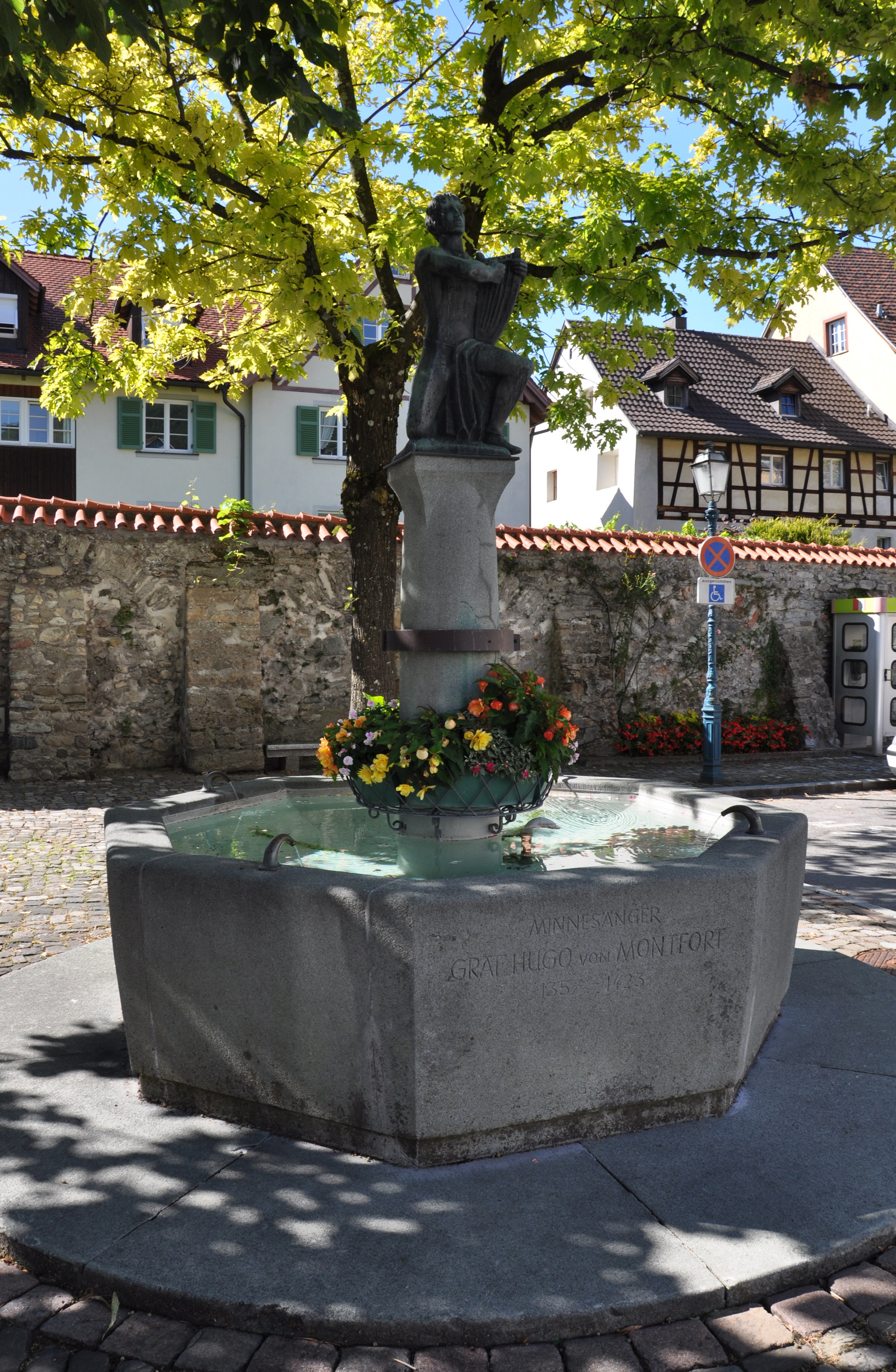
Montfort statue in Bregenz

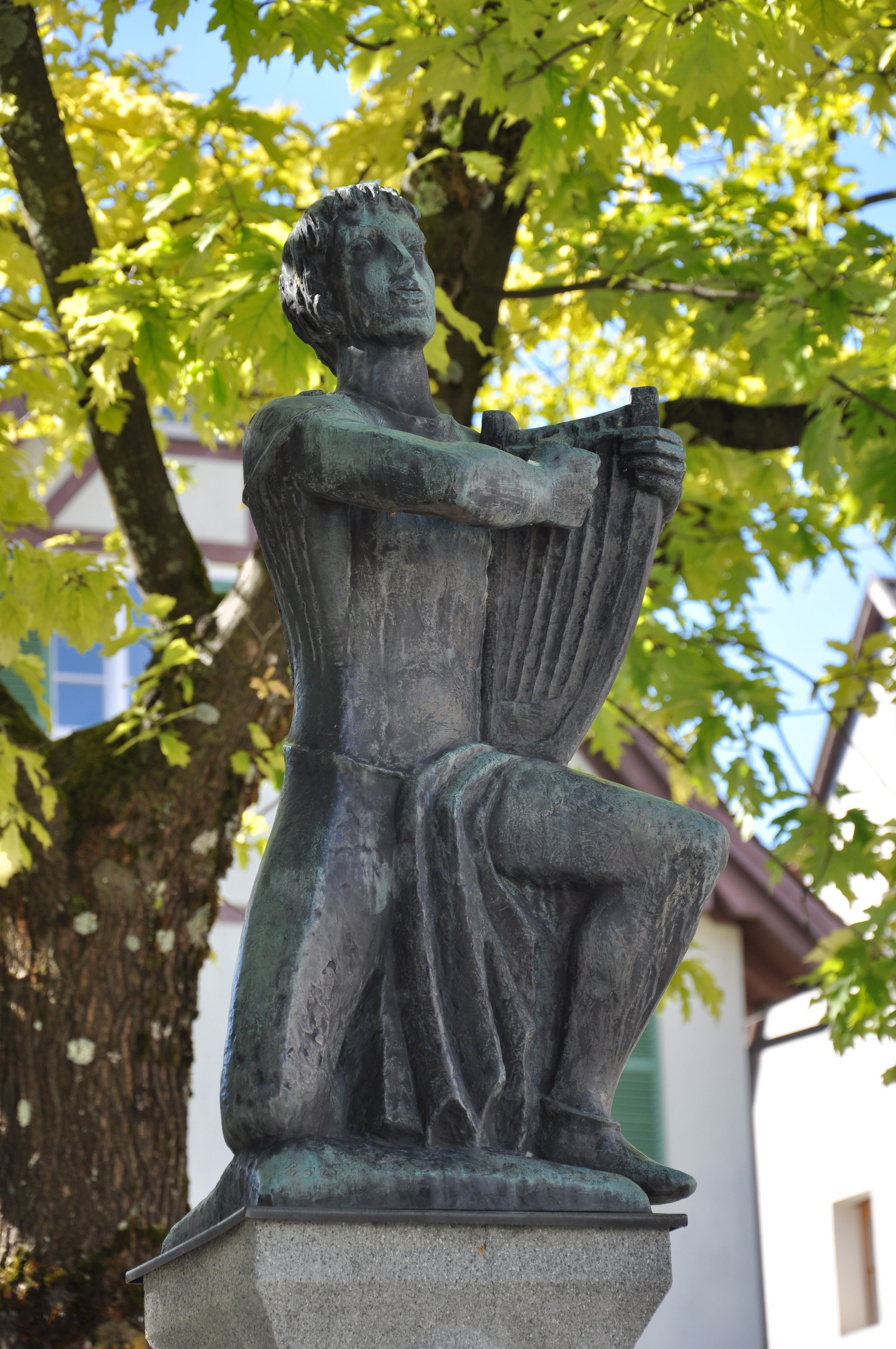
Montfort statue in Bregenz (detail)

== Recordings ==
- Die lieder des Hugo von Montfort: "Fro welt, ir sint gar húpsch und schón" Eberhard Kummer. ORF Alte Musik CD3011 [CDx2+DVD]
