= Emperor of Austria =

1804–1918 hereditary head of state of the Austrian (later Austro-Hungarian) Empire

- Kaiser von Österreich; Kaiser von Oesterreich; Pre-1918 spelling
- Imperial
- Coat of arms (until 1915)

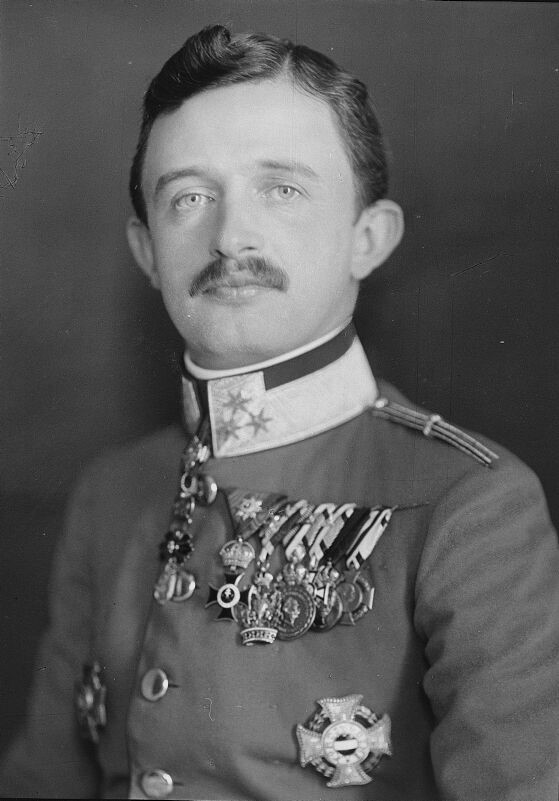
- Last to reign Charles I 21 November 1916 – 11 November 1918

Details
- Style: His Imperial Majesty
- First monarch: Francis I
- Last monarch: Charles I
- Formed: 11 August 1804
- Abolished: 11 November 1918
- Residences: Hofburg (main residence); Schönbrunn (summer residence)
- Appointer: Hereditary
- Pretender: Karl von Habsburg

Imperial Standard (from 1867 to 1915)

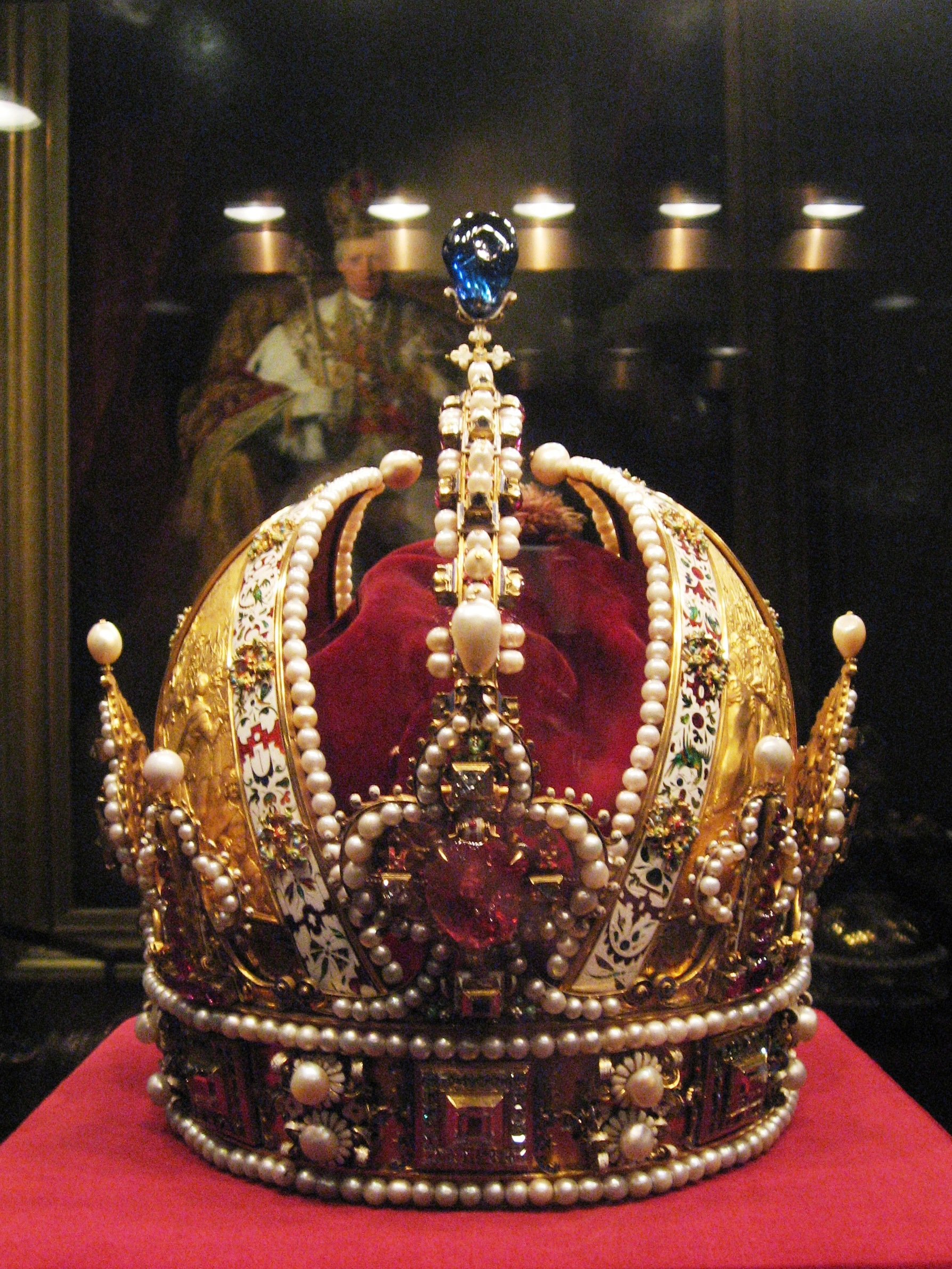
Imperial Crown of Austria

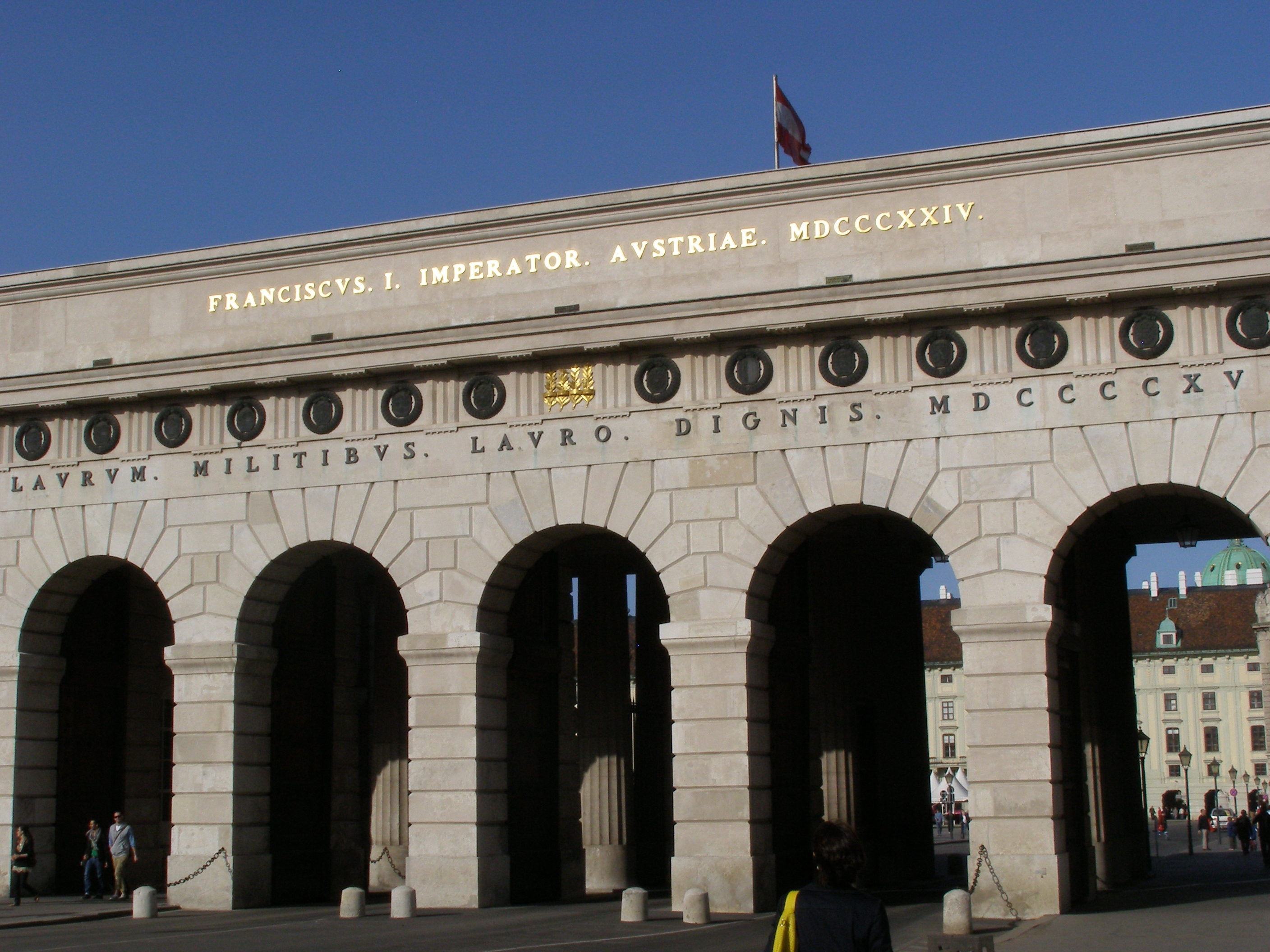
Golden dedication inscription at the Äusseres Burgtor of the Hofburg Palace in Vienna of "FRANCISCUS. I. IMPERATOR. AUSTRIAE. MDCCCXXIV." (Francis I, Emperor of Austria, 1824)

The Emperor of Austria (German: Kaiser von Österreich, Latin: Imperator Austriae) was the ruler of the Austrian Empire and later Cisleithania portion of the Austro-Hungarian Empire. The hereditary imperial title and office was proclaimed in 1804 by Holy Roman Emperor Francis II, a member of the House of Habsburg-Lorraine, and continually held by him and his heirs until Charles I relinquished power in 1918.

The emperors retained the title of Archduke of Austria. The wives of the emperors held the title empress, while other members of the family held the titles of archduke or archduchess.

== Predecessors ==
Members of the House of Austria, the Habsburg dynasty, had been the elected Holy Roman Emperors since 1438 (except for a five-year break from 1740 to 1745) and mostly resided in Vienna. Thus the term "Austrian emperor" may occur in texts dealing with the time before 1804, when no Austrian Empire existed. In these cases the word Austria means the composite monarchy ruled by the dynasty, not the country. A special case was Maria Theresa; she bore the imperial title as the consort of Francis I (r. 1745–1765), but she herself was the monarch of the Austrian hereditary lands including Bohemia and Hungary.

== The emperor ==
In the face of aggressions by Napoleon, who had been proclaimed Emperor of the French (French: Empereur des Français), by the Constitution of the Year XII on 18 May 1804, Francis II feared for the future of the Holy Roman Empire and wished to maintain his and his family's imperial status in case the Holy Roman Empire should be dissolved. Therefore, on 11 August 1804 he created the new title of "Emperor of Austria" for himself and his successors as heads of the House of Habsburg-Lorraine. For two years, Francis carried two imperial titles: being Holy Roman Emperor Francis II and "by the Grace of God" (Von Gottes Gnaden) Emperor Francis I of Austria.

In 1805, an Austrian-led army suffered a humiliating defeat at the Battle of Austerlitz and the victorious Napoleon proceeded to dismantle the old Reich (which at this time was only a powerless confederation) by motivating or pressuring several German princes to enter the separate Confederation of the Rhine with their lands in July. This led Francis II/I on 6 August 1806 to declare the Reich dissolved and to lay down the Imperial Crown created in the second half of the 10th century (today displayed at the Treasury of Hofburg Palace in Vienna).

From 1806 onwards, Francis was Emperor of Austria only. He had three successors—Ferdinand I, Francis Joseph I and Charles I—before the empire broke apart in 1918. A coronation ceremony was never established; the heir to the throne became emperor the moment his predecessor died or abdicated. The symbol of the Austrian emperor was the dynasty's private crown dating back to Rudolf II (r. 1576–1612), (called Rudolfinische Hauskrone by the experts).

== Titles of the Emperor ==
The Austrian emperors had an extensive list of titles and claims that reflected the geographic expanse and diversity of the lands ruled by the Austrian Habsburgs. The grand title of the emperor of Austria had been changed several times: by a patent of 1 August 1804, by a court office decree from 22 August 1836, by an Imperial court ministry decree of 6 January 1867 and finally by a letter of 12 December 1867. Shorter versions were recommended for official documents and international treaties: "Emperor of Austria, King of Bohemia etc. and Apostolic King of Hungary", "Emperor of Austria and Apostolic King of Hungary", "His Majesty the Emperor and King" and "His Imperial and Royal Apostolic Majesty".

The full list (after the loss of the Lombardy in 1859 and Venetia in 1866):

Emperor of Austria,
Apostolic King of Hungary,
King of Bohemia, of Dalmatia, of Croatia, of Slavonia, of Galicia, of Lodomeria, and of Illyria,
King of Jerusalem, and so forth,
Archduke of Austria,
Grand Duke of Tuscany and of Cracow,
Duke of Lorraine, of Salzburg, of Styria, of Carinthia, of Carniola and of the Bukovina,
Grand Prince of Transylvania,
Margrave in Moravia,
Duke of Upper and Lower Silesia, of Modena, Parma, Piacenza and Guastalla, of Auschwitz and Zator, of Teschen, Friuli, Ragusa and Zara,
Princely Count of Habsburg and Tyrol, of Kyburg, Gorizia and Gradisca,
Prince of Trent and Brixen,
Margrave of Upper and Lower Lusatia and in Istria,
Count of Hohenems, Feldkirch, Bregenz, Sonnenberg, and so forth,
Lord of Trieste, of Cattaro and of the Windic March,
Grand Voivode of the Voivodship of Serbia, and so forth,
Sovereign of the Order of the Golden Fleece.

== House and court ==
It was the overall goal to demonstrate the all-highest (allerhöchste) majesty and dignity of the monarch to his subjects and to other monarchs and countries. His and his entourage's life was governed by very strict rules all the time.

=== The Imperial House ===
The members of the House of Habsburg were ranked as princes and princesses of the blood imperial, with the honorary title of Erzherzog or Erzherzogin (archduke or archduchess). Their permanent address and their travels abroad had to be agreed to by the Emperor.

Whoever wanted to marry an archduke or archduchess of the Habsburg dynasty had to originate from a ruling or formerly ruling house, as was stipulated by the Familienstatut des Allerhöchsten Herrscherhauses, the Family Statute of the Highest Monarch's House, issued by Ferdinand I in 1839. Otherwise the marriage would be one "to the left hand", called a morganatic marriage, excluding the offspring of the couple from any right the House of Habsburg possessed. (The problems of such a situation were encountered when Archduke Franz Ferdinand of Austria, heir presumptive to the throne, married a simple countess in 1900).

To manage the political implications of the Imperial house after 1867 the Emperor and King appointed the k.u.k. Minister des kaiserlichen und königlichen Hauses und des Äußeren (the I.& R. Minister of the Imperial and Royal House and of the Exterior), one of the three ministers common to Austria and Hungary. Under Francis I, Klemens von Metternich had covered these and many other agenda, bearing the title Haus-, Hof- und Staatskanzler (Chancellor of the House, the Court and the State).

=== The Imperial Court ===
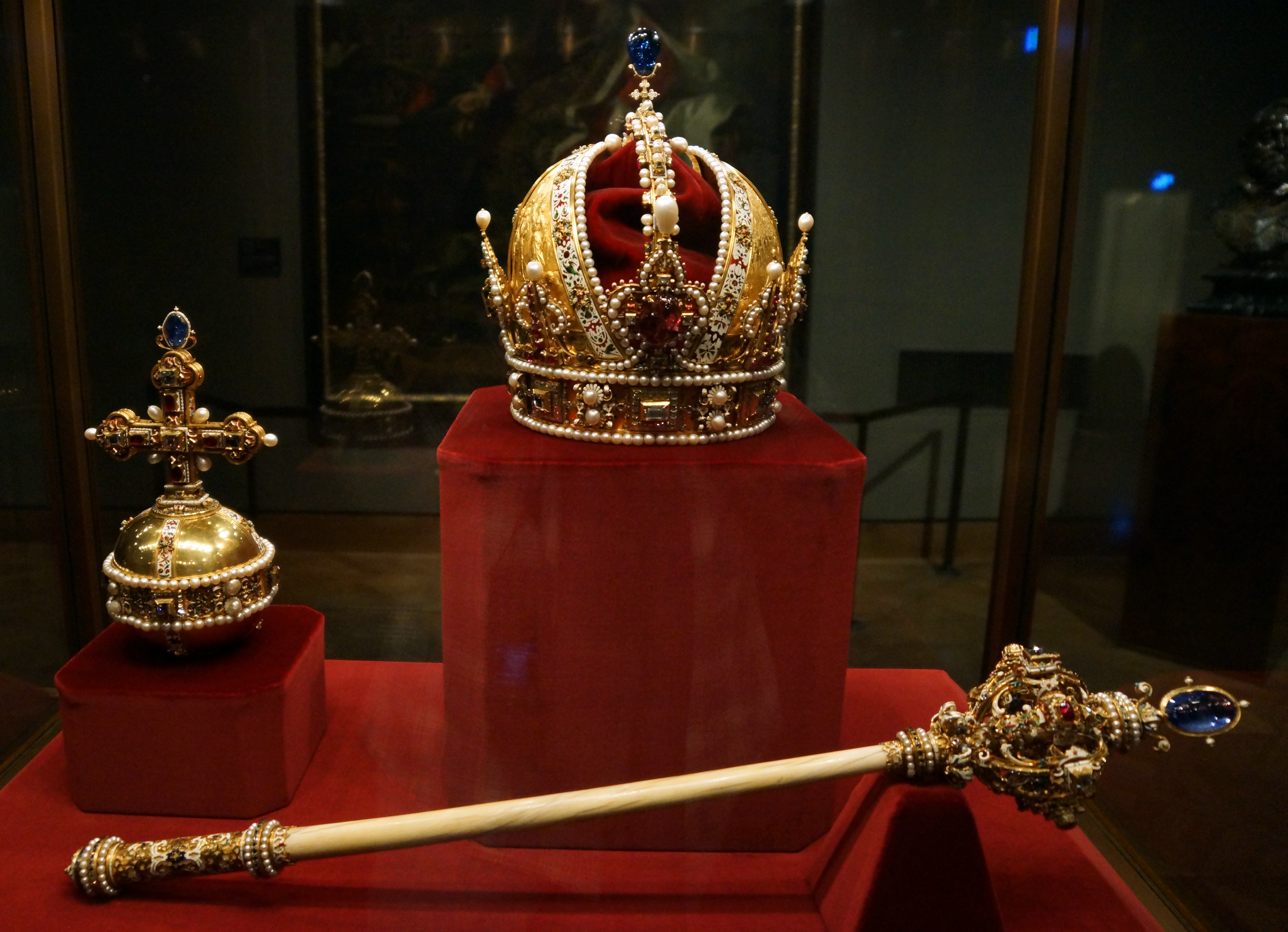
Crown Jewels of Austria

The Emperor's household, his personal officers and the premises where they worked were called Hof ("court").
The four highest officials managing the Imperial Court, who were drawn from among the highest noblemen of the Empire, were

- the Grand Master (Obersthofmeister),
- the Grand Marshal (Obersthofmarschall),
- the Grand Chamberlain (Oberstkämmerer),
- the Master of the Stables (Oberststallmeister).

Whoever sought an audience with the Emperor himself had to apply at the Office of the Grand Master (Obersthofmeisteramt). Francis I used to wear civilian clothes of the Biedermeier era, while Francis Joseph I and Charles I mostly were seen in the uniform of an Austrian field marshal to underline the importance of the army to the throne. Francis Joseph I expected soldiers to appear in uniform at his court and civilians to appear in tails. He never shook hands with visitors; in letters he never addressed his subjects as "Sir" or "Mr." (Herr).

The Emperor's court managed the following institutions:

- the Imperial Palace in Vienna (Hofburg); each of the four Emperors of Austria chose his living and working rooms in another part of this huge palace;
- the Imperial Treasury at Hofburg, where the Habsburgs' crown insignia were kept;
- the Imperial Court Library, today Austrian National Library
- Imperial residences outside Vienna, like Schönbrunn Palace (the area was included into the Vienna city area in 1892) and Laxenburg Palace;
- the court's collection of carriages (today Wagenburg at Schönbrunn Palace Gardens);
- the I.R. Hofburgtheater and the I.R. Hofoperntheater;
- the Imperial Crypt below the Capuchin Church and Monastery in Vienna, where three of the four emperors of Austria have been buried (Charles I was buried on Madeira, his last exile).

== Austrian Empire ==
The Austrian Empire (Kaisertum Österreich) from 1804 to 1867 consisted of the Habsburg lands as a whole, leaving each land its special definition as kingdom (e.g., Bohemia, Hungary), archduchy (Lower and Upper Austria), duchy (e.g., Carniola) or princely county (e.g., Tyrol), however the Kingdom of Hungary—as Regnum Independens—was administered by its own institutions separately from the rest of the empire. Kaisertum might literally be translated as "emperordom" on analogy with "kingdom" or "emperor-ship"; the term denotes specifically "the territory ruled by an emperor". Austria proper (as opposed to the complex of Habsburg lands as a whole) had been an archduchy since the 15th century, and most of the other territories of the Empire had their own institutions and territorial history, although there were some attempts at centralization, especially between 1848 and 1859.

In 1866, Austria lost the war with Prussia and Italy. Francis Joseph I was urged to solve the internal problems of his realm and was well-advised to provide a substantial concession to the Hungarian nobility, which had stayed in passive resistance to him after the crushed Hungarian revolution of 1848–1849. By the Austro-Hungarian Compromise of 1867 (Ausgleich), the Kingdom of Hungary and the Empire of Austria, as two separate entities, joined on an equal basis to form the Dual Monarchy of Austria-Hungary. Thus the former Habsburg-ruled lands were restructured into a dual union which shared a monarch and a common army, navy and foreign policy. Transylvania became again an integral part of Hungary while Croatia-Slavonia were acknowledged as part of the Lands of the Crown of Saint Stephen, which were called Transleithania by government officials to distinguish them from Cisleithania, the Austrian part of the empire from 1867 onwards. The latter were known in the internal administration as the "Kingdoms and Lands Represented in the Imperial Council" (Die im Reichsrat vertretenen Königreiche und Länder). Unofficially ever since, these territories officially were called "Austria" from 1915 to 1918 only, despite the fact that all the citizens held the common Austrian citizenship since 1867.

Austria-Hungary disintegrated at the end of World War I in 1918, when the Austrian lands established their independence. Bohemia and Moravia in the newly created Czechoslovakia, Galicia joined Poland, while Bukovina became a part of Romania. Carniola and Dalmatia joined the Kingdom of Serbs, Croats and Slovenes. Other territories were annexed by Italy (South Tyrol, Trieste and Istria). Yet the last Emperor, Charles I, used his imperial title until the end of his life. The Kingdom of Hungary, due to measures enacted during peace proceedings after the Great War and having terminated the 1867 compromise by 31 October 1918, similarly broke apart.

== Abbreviations of common and non common institutions ==
The term Kaiserlich und Königlich (k.u.k., spoken /ka ʔʊnt ka/, meaning "Imperial and Royal") was decreed in a letter of 17 October 1889 for the army, the navy and the institutions shared by both parts of the monarchy. Institutions of Cisleithania used the term Kaiserlich-Königlich (K.K., meaning "Imperial Royal", e.g. K.K. österreichische Staatsbahnen, Imperial Royal Austrian State Railways).

== List of emperors of Austria (1804–1918) ==
Name	Lifespan	Reign start	Reign end	Notes	Family	Image
Francis I	12 February 1768 – 2 March 1835 (aged 67)	11 August 1804	2 March 1835 (30 years, 203 days)	The last Holy Roman Emperor; Son of Leopold II	Habsburg-Lorraine	
Ferdinand I	19 April 1793 – 29 June 1875 (aged 82)	2 March 1835	2 December 1848 (abdicated) (13 years, 275 days)	Son of Francis I	Habsburg-Lorraine	
Franz Joseph I	18 August 1830 – 21 November 1916 (aged 86)	2 December 1848	21 November 1916 (67 years, 355 days)	Nephew of Ferdinand I; grandson of Francis I	Habsburg-Lorraine	
Charles I: the Blessed	17 August 1887 – 1 April 1922 (aged 34)	21 November 1916	11 November 1918 (resigned) (1 year, 355 days)	Grand-Nephew of Franz Joseph I; great-great-grandson of Francis I	Habsburg-Lorraine	

== Succession to the throne ==
The heir apparent to the throne bore the title of Crown Prince (Kronprinz); heirs presumptive were called Thronfolger, in addition to their title of archduke. Francis I was followed by Ferdinand Charles, (later Ferdinand I). In the wake of the 1848 revolutions, the empire's existence was in danger. The Habsburg family tried a new start with a new emperor: Ferdinand I was urged to hand over government on 2 December 1848. He then moved to Prague Castle and, without laying down his imperial title, lived there privately until his death in 1875.

As Ferdinand I had no sons, his brother Francis Charles would have become emperor, but was persuaded by his wife Princess Sophie of Bavaria to pass over the right of succession to their son, Francis Joseph. He accepted the duty of the Emperor of Austria without having been Crown Prince or Thronfolger before. Francis Joseph's only son Rudolf committed suicide in 1889, Francis Joseph's brother Karl Ludwig died in 1896. Karl Ludwig's son Franz Ferdinand became heir presumptive to the throne. He was assassinated in Sarajevo, Bosnia in 1914; due to his morganatic marriage, his son had no rights to the throne. At this time his younger brother Otto Franz had already died, which made Otto's son Charles the new heir presumptive to the throne, to which he acceded in 1916 as Charles I, upon the death of Francis Joseph I. In this moment Charles I's son, four-year-old Otto became the last Crown Prince of Austria-Hungary. He declared himself a loyal citizen of the Republic of Austria in 1961.

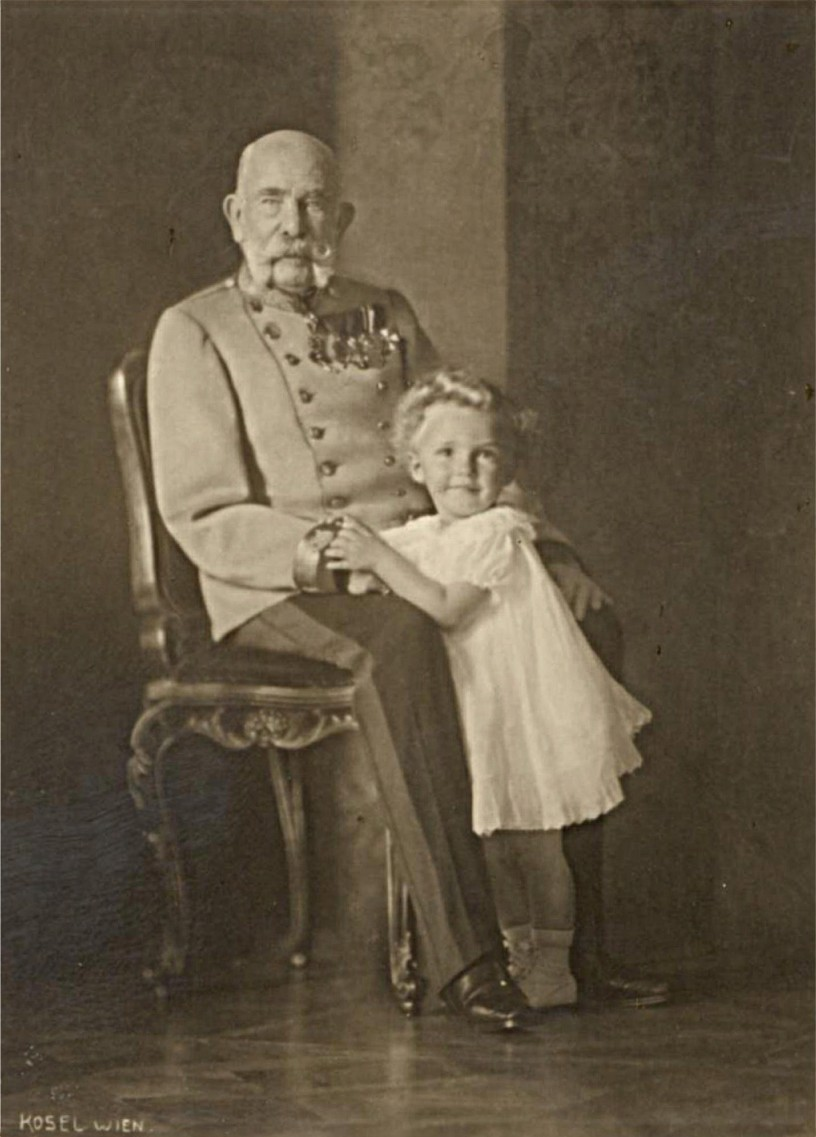
Emperor Franz Joseph I and his great-grandnephew and second-in-line to the throne Otto von Habsburg, in 1914

== Heads of the House of Habsburg-Lorraine (since 1918) ==
Karl I did not see himself as a pretender but as the monarch of Austria, while the Habsburg Law of the Republic of Austria of 1919 called him "the former bearer of the crown" (der ehemalige Träger der Krone). His son Otto von Habsburg, who had used the title Archduke of Austria in his earlier life outside of Austria, declared himself a loyal citizen of the Republic in order to be allowed to enter Austria; from 1961 onwards he no longer considered himself pretender. Otto's son Karl von Habsburg has never pretended to be the rightful monarch of Austria.

- Karl I of Austria (11 November 1918 – 1 April 1922)
- Otto von Habsburg (1 April 1922 – 1 January 2007)
- Karl von Habsburg (1 January 2007 – present)
  - Heir apparent: Ferdinand Zvonimir von Habsburg

== See also ==
- Austrian nobility
- Holy Roman Emperor
- List of Austrian consorts
- List of rulers of Austria
- Pragmatic Sanction of 1713
- List of heads of government under Austrian emperors
- Habsburg monarchy
