= Rudolf IV of Hachberg-Sausenberg =

15th Century Margrave of Hachberg-Sausenberg

Rudolf IV, Margrave of Hachberg-Sausenberg
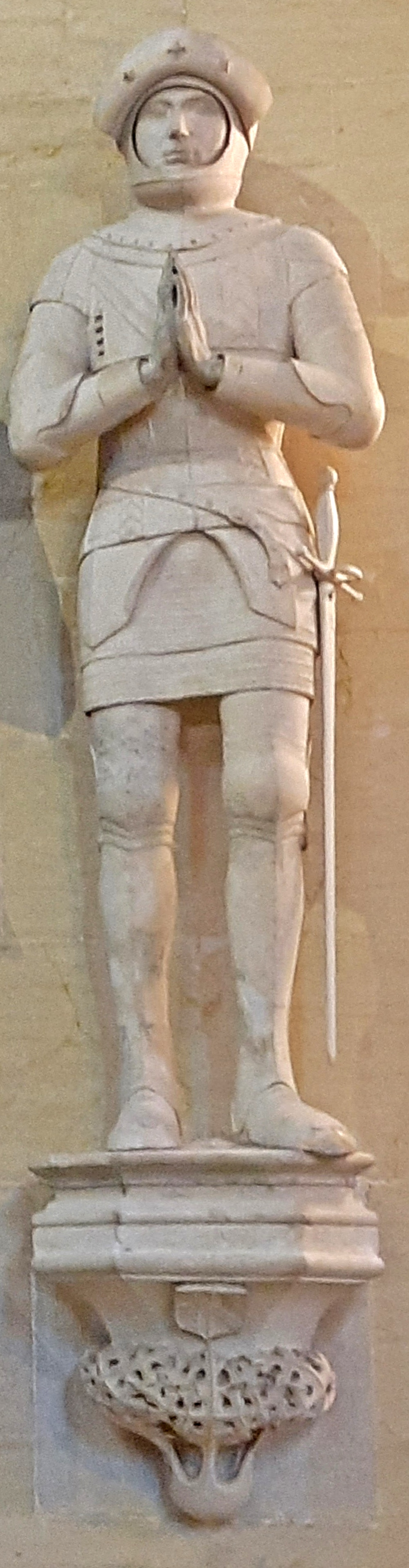
- Margrave Rudolf IV of Hachberg-Sausenberg – photograph of his tomb in the Collegiate Church of Neuchâtel
- Born: 1426 or 1427; Rötteln Castle
- Died: 12 April 1487; Rötteln Castle
- Noble family: House of Zähringen
- Spouse: Margaret of Vienne
- Issue: Philip of Hachberg-Sausenberg
- Father: William, Margrave of Hachberg-Sausenberg
- Mother: Elisabeth of Montfort-Bregenz

Margrave Rudolf IV of Hachberg-Sausenberg (1426 or 1427, Rötteln Castle – 12 April 1487, Rötteln Castle) was the son the Margrave William of Hachberg-Sausenberg and his wife Elisabeth of Montfort-Bregenz.

In 1441, Rudolf's father abdicated in favor of Rudolf and his brother Hugo. Since they were both minors at the time, their uncle Count John of Freiburg-Neuchâtel took up government as their guardian. Hugo died in 1444.

Rudolf was a Margrave of Hachberg-Sausenberg from 1441, and a Count of Neuchâtel from 1447.

== Marriage and issue ==
Rudolf married Margaret of Vienne. She brought Sainte Croix Castle and other property in Burgundy into the marriage. They had at least two children: a son, Philip and a daughter. Catherine.

== The construction ==
Rudolf IV expanded Badenweiler Castle and Rötteln Castle. To the latter, he added the lower gate in the outer bailey. Between 1479 and 1482, he rebuilt the City Church in Schopfheim, which had burned down. There are traces of his construction activities in the monastery church at Weitenau and in the churches of Rötteln and Egringen.

== The expansion of the country ==
On 8 September 1444, Count John of Freiburg-Neuchâtel gave the Badenweiler district, including Badenweiler Castle to his nephews Rudolf IV and Hugo. The districts of Badenweiler, Rötteln and Hachberg-Sausenberg then formed an almost contiguous area Markgräflerland, north of Basel and south of Freiburg.

Count John of Freiburg-Neuchâtel and his wife Marie of Chalon had six children, but they all died in childhood.

In 1447, John of Freiburg-Neuchâtel transferred the county of Neuchâtel, including its Castle to Rudolf. After John's death (19 February 1458), Rudolf inherited further possessions in the Free County of Burgundy.

== The Diplomat ==
In 1451 and 1452, Rudolf accompanied King Frederick III on his journey to Rome for his coronation. In 1454, Duke Philip the Good paid him a visit at Rötteln Castle. In 1458, he was appointed Councillor and Chamberlain at the court of the Duke of Burgundy. He was a familiar figure, where he was known as the Marquis de Rothelin.

In 1467, Duke Charles the Bold of Burgundy appointed him as governor of Luxembourg. In 1468, he mediated in a dispute between Duke Sigismund of Austria-Tyrol and the Old Swiss Confederation.

=== Attempt to safeguard his possessions in Baden ===
Rudolf was aware that his position as vassal of the German Empire on the one hand and his Burgundian interests on the other hand it could bring him in a dangerous situation. To keep the possessions in Baden in the family, he was therefore negotiating with Margrave Charles I of Baden and his son Albert. Shortly before Rudolf's death, Charles I's grandson Philip I, a son of Christopher I, stayed at Rudolf's court for a while. The negotiations did not reach a conclusion during Rudolf's lifetime, but Rudolf's son Philip resume the negotiations with Christopher I and they reached an agreement in 1490.

== See also ==
- Baden
- List of rulers of Baden

== References and sources ==
- August Huber: Über Basels Anteil am Röteler Erbfolgestreit im Jahre 1503, in: Basler Zeitschrift für Geschichte und Altertumskunde, vol 4, 1905
- Johann Christian Sachs: Einleitung in die Geschichte der Marggravschaft und des marggrävlichen altfürstlichen Hauses Baden, Frankfurt / Leipzig, 1764, Part 1, pp. 557–574
- Fritz Schülin: Binzen, Beiträge zur Orts-, Landschafts- und Siedlungsgeschichte, Schopfheim, 1967; pp. 523–524 (Genealogy of the House of Hachberg-Sausenberg).
- Fritz Schülin: Rötteln-Haagen, Beiträge zur Orts-, Landschafts- und Siedlungsgeschichte, Lörrach, 1965
- Karl Seith: Die Burg Rötteln im Wandel ihrer Herrengeschlechter, Ein Beitrag zur Geschichte und Baugeschichte der Burg, special issue published by Röttelbund e.V., Haagen, described by Schülin as "in: Markgräflerland, vol 3, issue 1, 1931"
- Hans Jakob Wörner: Das Markgräflerland – Bemerkungen zu seinem geschichtlichen Werdegang, in: Das Markgräflerland, vol 2/1994, Schopfheim, 1994, p. 63

== Gallery ==
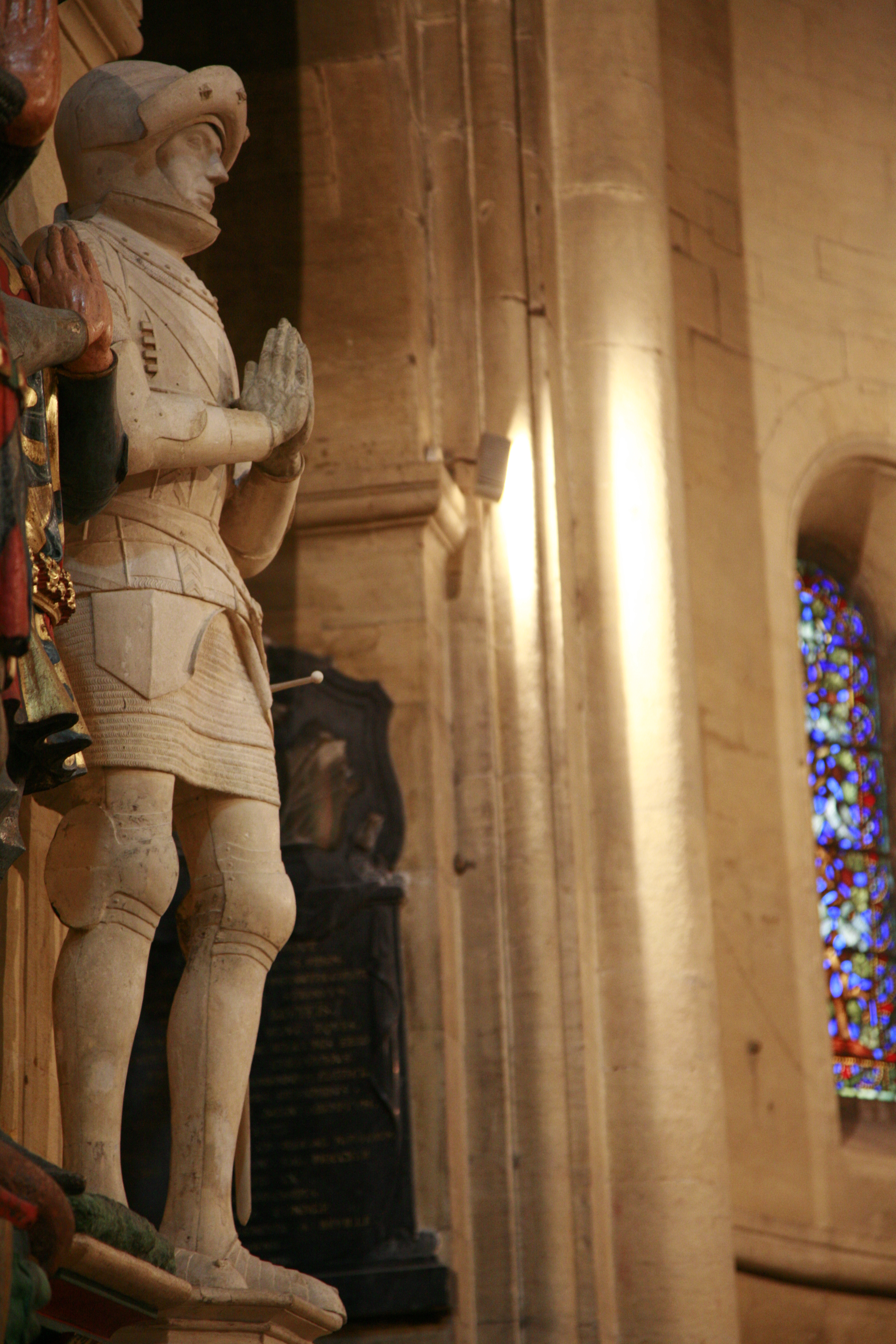

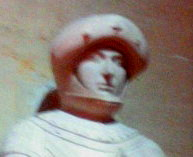

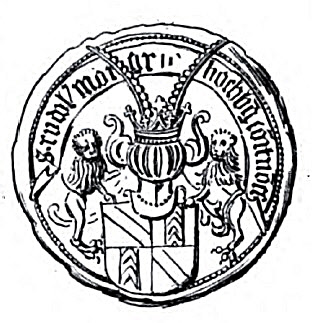

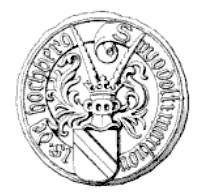

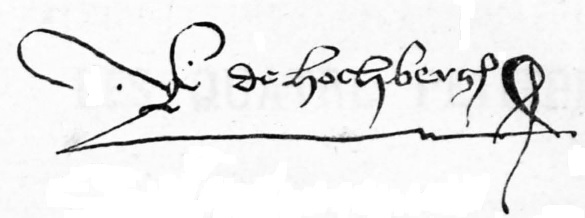

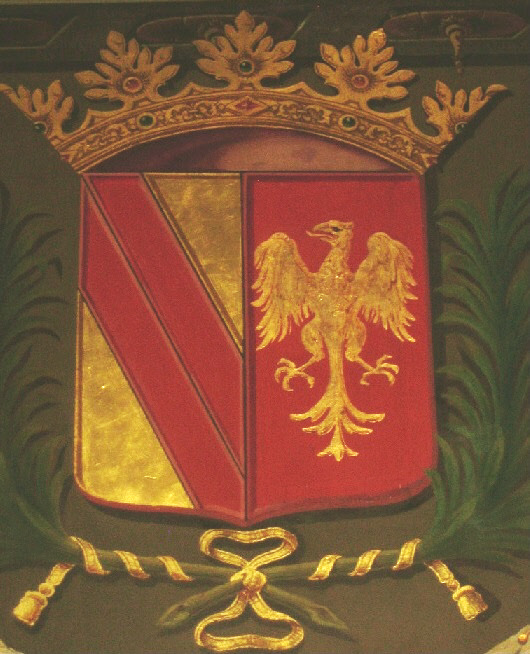

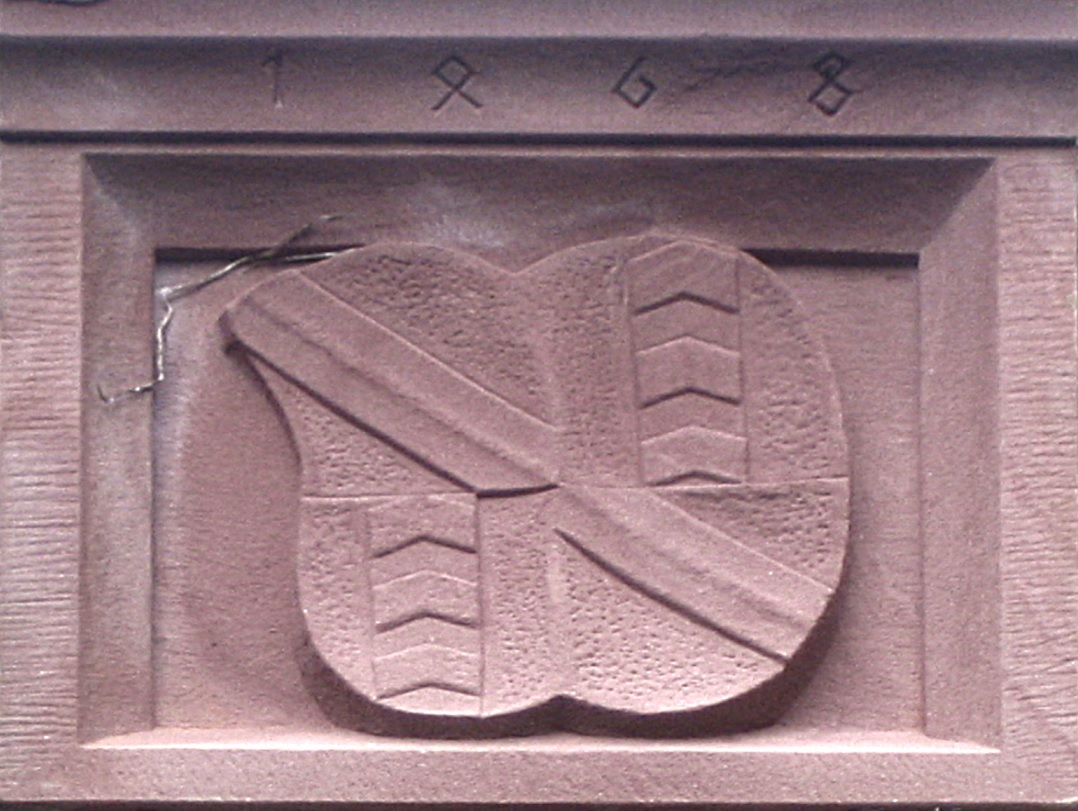

Rudolf IV of Hachberg-Sausenberg House of Zähringen Born: 1426 or 1427 Died: 12 April 1487
Preceded by William	Margrave of Hachberg-Sausenberg; 1441–1487	Succeeded by Philip
