= Counts of Montfort (Swabia) =

German noble dynasty

Coat of arms of the Counts of Montfort

The Counts of Montfort were an ancient German noble dynasty from Swabia. They belonged to high nobility of the Holy Roman Empire and enjoyed the privileged status of Imperial immediacy.

The influential and wealthy counts of Montfort took their name from an ancestral castle named Montfort, which was situated close to today's Swiss border near Weiler, in the present-day Austrian state of Vorarlberg.

As the lords of Feldkirch (until 1390), Bregenz (until 1523), and Tettnang (until 1779), they would have a decisive influence on the development of not just Vorarlberg, but also Upper Swabia and Eastern Switzerland.

== History ==
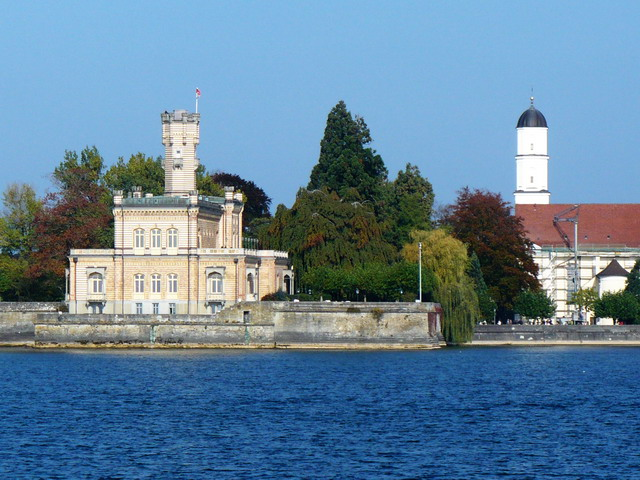
Montfort Castle at Langenargen

The counts held the lordships of the County of Feldkirch (until 1390), County of Bregenz (until 1523) and Tettnang (until 1779). They had territories in Upper Swabia and particularly in Vorarlberg, most of which they ruled. Until the 18th century, the counts were a remarkable family of the high nobility, the most important in the region of Lake Constance, but the line eventually became extinct. In a number of places, including Feldkirch, Bregenz and Langenargen, there are still signs of their history.

The counts of Montfort were originally a branch of another Swabian noble family, the counts palatine of Tübingen. Hugo II of Tübingen (d. 1182) married Elizabeth of Bregenz, and through her, Hugo would take ownership over the former territories of the counts of Bregenz, including Bregenz itself, Montfort, and Sigmaringen, making him a dominant power in the region. His marriage to Elizabeth would also provide him with close family ties to Emperor Frederick I Barbarossa and the Welfs (like Barbarossa and Henry the Lion, Elizabeth was a grandchild of the Welf duke Henry IX of Bavaria). His marriage to Elizabeth would also provide him with close family ties to Emperor Frederick I Barbarossa and the Welfs (like Barbarossa and Henry the Lion, Elizabeth was a grandchild of the Welf duke Henry IX of Bavaria).

Upon the death of Hugo II, the majority of the former Bregenz territories would go to his second son, Hugo III (d. 1228/1230), who after about 1200 would style himself "Hugo of Montfort". His territories as count included Raetia Curiensis, Tettnang, Bregenz, Feldkirch, Sonnenberg, Werdenberg, and Sargans. The new House of Montfort would adopt the arms of the County Palatine of Tübingen, but the Montfort arms would feature a red gonfalon on a silver shield instead of a gold one.

Hugo's older brother Rudolph I (1160–1219) continued the original line of the counts palatine; nevertheless, five generations later Gottfried II (d. 1369) would be forced to sell Tübingen to the County of Württemberg and drop the title of count palatine in favor of the ordinary Count of Tübingen. He did, however, inherit Lichteneck via his wife Clara of Freiburg, and thenceforth his descendants would bear the title Count of Tübingen-Lichteneck. Next to Montfort-Tettang, this line would be the longest-lasting branch of the family, lasting until 1664.

Around 1779, Tettnang was sold to the Austrian House of Habsburg in order to pay debts. Several years later, the line became extinct upon the death of Count Anton IV in 1787. The Habsburgs added the Montfort lands to their Further Austrian possessions.

=== Montfort-Feldkirch ===
Hugo I of Montfort founded Feldkirch in the early years of the 13th century, building his castle (called Schattenburg) on a hill overlooking the town. The town and castle would become the focal point of the Montfort-Feldkirch territories, with Schattenburg taking the place of the original Montfort castle. In 1375, burgrave Rudolph IV of Montfort sold the fiefdom to the Habsburg Duke Leopold III of Austria.

=== Montfort-Bregenz ===
Hugo II of Tübingen (d. 1182) inherited the County of Bregenz via his wife, Elizabeth of Bregenz. The Montfort-Bregenz branch of the dynasty continued until the middle of the 14th century, when its lands fell to Montfort-Tettnang, which starting in 1354 would be known as Montfort-Tettnang-Bregenz. This house would produce at least one figure of historical significance, the minstrel (Minnesänger) and statesman Hugo von Montfort (1357–1423).

In 1362 Hugo inherited the lands of the counts of Pfannberg via his wife Margaret. Hugo took residence at Pfannberg Castle in 1401, joining the Styrian nobility. The family would sell Pfannberg Castle in 1524 and move their residence to Peggau Castle, renaming themselves Montfort-Bregenz-Beckach (the contemporary form of Peggau).

In 1451, a portion of the Montfort-Bregenz territory was sold to the Habsburgs by Elizabeth of Hochberg, heir of Count William VII (d. 1422) of Montfort. The rest of the original Bregenz territories would be sold in 1523, though the Styrian branch of the family retained the Montfort-Tettnang lands until the extinction of the dynasty in 1787.

== Counts of Montfort ==
Below, a list of the counts of Montfort, numbered by order of ascension:

=== House of Tübingen ===
==== Partitions of Montfort under Tübingen rule ====
County of Montfort (1208–1260)
County of Feldkirch (1260–1375)	County of Tettnang (1260–1520)	County of Bregenz (1st creation) (1260–1338)
Sold to Austria
County of Bregenz (2nd creation) (1353–1443)	County of Pfannberg (1379–1524); Renamed; County of Peggau (1524–1779)
County of Rothenfels (1438–1576)	County of Werdenberg (1438–1483)
Sold to Austria
County of Bregenz (3rd creation, half of previous county) (1482–1525)
Sold to Austria
Sold to Königsegg
Sold to Austria

==== Table of rulers ====
(Note: Here the numbering of the counts is the same for all counties, as all were titled Counts of Montfort, despite the different parts of land or particular numbering of the rulers. The counts are numbered by the year of their succession.)

Ruler	Born	Reign	Death	Ruling part	Consort	Notes
Hugo I	c. 1160	1208–1228	1228 or 12 March 1230 or 1234	Montfort	Matilda of Eschenbach-Schnabelburg two children; Matilda of Wangen five children	Son of Count Palatine Hugo of Tübingen, was the first count of Montfort, and the founder of the Montfort branch.
Hugo II	c. 1195	1228 – 1257 or 1260	11 or 15 August 1257 or 1260	Montfort	Elisabeth of Burgau eight children	Sons of Hugo I, ruled together until 1230, when Rudolph inherited Werdenberg. Henry became bishop at Chur in 1251. For Rudolph I's descendants, see Counts of Werdenberg. After Hugo's death the county was divided.
Henry I	c. 1190	1228–1251	14 November 1272	Montfort	Unmarried	Sons of Hugo I, ruled together until 1230, when Rudolph inherited Werdenberg. Henry became bishop at Chur in 1251. For Rudolph I's descendants, see Counts of Werdenberg. After Hugo's death the county was divided.
Rudolph I	c. 1190	1228–1230	September 1244, 7 October 1247 or 19 May 1248	Montfort	Clementia of Kyburg c. 1230 six children	Sons of Hugo I, ruled together until 1230, when Rudolph inherited Werdenberg. Henry became bishop at Chur in 1251. For Rudolph I's descendants, see Counts of Werdenberg. After Hugo's death the county was divided.
Ulrich I	unknown	1260–1287	7 April 1287	Montfort-Bregenz	Agnes of Helfenstein c. 1272 two children	Son of Hugo II, inherited Bregenz.
Henry III	unknown	1260 – c. 1280?	17 January 1307	Montfort-Bregenz	Unmarried	Son of Hugo II, possibly co-ruled with Ulrich in Bregenz, which was probably the part which retained the main of the original county. As he was already cited as canon at Chur in 1282, he probably left the rule of the county earlier.
Rudolph II	unknown	1260–1302	19 October 1302	Montfort-Feldkirch	Agnes of Groningen c. 1265 seven children	Son of Hugo II, inherited Feldkirch.
Hugo III	unknown	1260–1309	21 May or 5 December 1309	Montfort-Tettnang	Elisabeth two children	Son of Hugo II, inherited Tettnang.
Hugo IV	unknown	1287–1338	26 July 13388	Montfort-Bregenz	Unmarried	Sold half of Bregenz to Austria. Left no descendants and Bregenz was annexed to Tettnang.
Ulrich II	1266	1302–1343	17 February 1350	Montfort-Feldkirch	Unmarried	Sons of Rudolph III, ruled jointly. Rudolph became, in 1322, Bishop of Constance, and probably had to abdicate form the county. During the co-rulership, the brothers favored the settlement of Jews in Feldkirch. In 1343 his nephews forced Ulrich to abdicate.
Rudolph III	unknown	1302–1322	27 or 28 March 1334	Montfort-Feldkirch	Unmarried	Sons of Rudolph III, ruled jointly. Rudolph became, in 1322, Bishop of Constance, and probably had to abdicate form the county. During the co-rulership, the brothers favored the settlement of Jews in Feldkirch. In 1343 his nephews forced Ulrich to abdicate.
Hugo V	unknown	1302–1310	11 August 1310	Montfort-Feldkirch	Anna of Veringen eight children	Sons of Rudolph III, ruled jointly. Rudolph became, in 1322, Bishop of Constance, and probably had to abdicate form the county. During the co-rulership, the brothers favored the settlement of Jews in Feldkirch. In 1343 his nephews forced Ulrich to abdicate.
Frederick	unknown	1310–1321	25 March 1321	Montfort-Feldkirch	Unmarried	Sons of Hugo V, co-ruled with their uncle.
Berthold	unknown	1310–1318	18 January 1318	Montfort-Feldkirch	Unmarried	Sons of Hugo V, co-ruled with their uncle.
William I	unknown	1309–1338	c. 1350	Montfort-Tettnang	Elisabeth von Schlüsselberg one child; Maria Anna Magdalena von Schwarzenberg no children; Kunigunde from the House of Rappoltstein four children; Unknown no children	Inherited Bregenz in 1338. After his death his sons divided the land.
William I	unknown	1338 – 1348 or 1350	c. 1350	Montfort-Tettnang and Montfort-Bregenz	Elisabeth von Schlüsselberg one child; Maria Anna Magdalena von Schwarzenberg no children; Kunigunde from the House of Rappoltstein four children; Unknown no children	Inherited Bregenz in 1338. After his death his sons divided the land.
Rudolph IV the Elder	unknown	1343–1375	1375	Montfort-Feldkirch	Unmarried	Sons of Hugo V, were ruling jointly with their uncle (Ulrich II) and brothers (Berthold and Frederick) since 1310. However, they gained more independence after deposing their uncle in 1343.
Hugo VI	unknown	1343 – c. 1360	c. 1360	Montfort-Feldkirch	Margaret of Furstenberg no children; Bertha of Kirchberg c. 1341 two children	Sons of Hugo V, were ruling jointly with their uncle (Ulrich II) and brothers (Berthold and Frederick) since 1310. However, they gained more independence after deposing their uncle in 1343.
Ulrich III	unknown	1359 – c. 1362	c. 1362	Montfort-Feldkirch	Unmarried	Eldest son of Rudolph IV, probably co-ruled with his father after his uncle Hugo's death.
Hugo VII	unknown	1348 or 1350 – 1354	3 November 1354	Montfort-Tettnang	Unmarried	Son of William I, inherited Tettnang. Had no descendants and the comital throne passed to his brother Henry.
William II	unknown	1348 or 1350 – 1373 or 1374	18 May 1373 or 14 June 1374	Montfort-Bregenz	Unknown one child; Ursula de Ferrette 1354 no children; Margaret of Schaumberg 26 March 1369 or 16 June 1373 no children	Son of William I, inherited Bregenz. After his death his grandchildren divided the land.
William III	unknown	1348 or 1350 – 1368	19 October 1368	Montfort-Bregenz	Ursula of Hohenberg c. 1367 two children	Son of William II, co-ruled with his father, predeceasing him.
Henry IV	unknown	1354 – 1407 or 1408	1407 or 1408	Montfort-Tettnang	Adelaide of Habsburg-Laufenburg before 1370 four children; Klara von Ellenbach one child	
Henry V	unknown	c. 1380 – 1395	c. 1395	Montfort-Tettnang	Anna of Waldburg one child	Son of Henry I, co-ruled with his father, predeceasing him.
Conrad	unknown	1373 or 1374 – 1393	1393	Montfort-Bregenz	Agnes of Montfort-Feldkirch two children	Son of William II, co-ruled with his father, predeceasing him. Through his marriage became son-in-law of Hugo VI.
Hugo VIII	1357	1373 or 1374 – 1423	4 April 1423	Montfort-Pfannberg	Margaret of Pfannberg c. 1373 one child; Clementia of Toggenburg before 1401 no children; Anna of Neuhaus before 1426 one child	Son of William III, inherited Montfort. He was also a minnesinger (troubadour).
Ulrich IV	unknown	c. 1390 – 1410?	c. 1410?	Montfort-Pfannberg	Judith of Stadeck before 1410 two children	Son of Hugo VIII, co-ruled with his father, predeceasing him.
Rudolph V the Younger	unknown	1375	16 November 1390	Montfort-Feldkirch	Unmarried	In 1375 sold the county to the Habsburgs.
In 1375, Feldkirch was sold to the Archduchy of Austria
William IV	unknown	1393–1422	1422	Montfort-Bregenz	Kunigunde of Toggenburg; September/October 1387 one child	
William V	unknown	1408–1439	1439	Montfort-Tettnang	Kunigunde of Werdenberg-Bludenz one child	Sons of Henry I, ruled jointly. After William's death, his sons divided the land into Tettnang, Werdenberg and Rothenfels.
Rudolph VI	unknown	1408–1425	8 December 1425	Montfort-Tettnang	Unmarried	Sons of Henry I, ruled jointly. After William's death, his sons divided the land into Tettnang, Werdenberg and Rothenfels.
John I	unknown	1425 – c. 1431	c. 1431	Montfort-Tettnang	Unmarried	Probably co-ruled with his father after the death of his uncle Rudolph.
Elisabeth	unknown	1422–1443	4 June 1458	Montfort-Bregenz	Eberhard of Nellenburg c. 1413 one child; William, Margrave of Hachberg-Sausenberg 17 August 1422 or 23 February 1424 (annulled 1436) two children	Last countess of Bregenz. In 1443 she sold the county to Austria.
In 1443 Bregenz was sold to the Archduchy of Austria
Stephen	After 1401	1423–1437	14 or 27 August 1437	Montfort-Pfannberg	Unmarried	Ruled jointly. Stephen was an uncle of Herman I, who was son of Ulrich IV.
Herman I	unknown	1423 – 1434 or 1435	22 January 1434 or 24 July 1435	Montfort-Pfannberg	Margareta of Celje; 15 March 1430 four children	Ruled jointly. Stephen was an uncle of Herman I, who was son of Ulrich IV.
Herman II	unknown	1437–1482	1482	Montfort-Pfannberg	Cecilia of Liechtenstein-Murau; 1462 five children	Sons of Herman I, ruled jointly.
John II	unknown	1437–1469	April 1469	Montfort-Pfannberg	A woman from the Sternberg family no children	Sons of Herman I, ruled jointly.
George I	unknown	1437–1447	1447	Montfort-Pfannberg	Unmarried	Sons of Herman I, ruled jointly.
Ulrich V the Elder	unknown	1439–1495	29 September 1495	Montfort-Tettnang	Ursula of Hachberg; 1467 one child	Sons of William V, ruled jointly.
Rudolph VII	unknown	1439–1445	11 December 1445	Montfort-Tettnang	Beatrice of Helfenstein no children	Sons of William V, ruled jointly.
Henry VI		1439–1444	23 November 1444	Montfort-Werdenberg	Unknown one child	Son of William V, inherited Werdenberg.
Hugo IX		1439–1491	16 October 1491	Montfort-Rothenfels	Elisabeth of Werdenberg-Heiligenberg before 1462 one child; Elisabeth of Hohenlohe (d.24 December 1488)before 1488 one child	Son of William V, inherited Rothenfels.
William VI	unknown	1444–1483	5 February 1483	Montfort-Werdenberg	Clementia von Hewen two children	Left no descendants. Werdenberg merged in Rothenfels.
In 1483 Werdenberg was annexed by Rothenfels.
In 1482 half of Bregenz was recovered by Hugo, son of Herman II.
Hugo X	unknown	1482–1525	1550	Montfort-Bregenz	Veronica of Waldburg no children	Son of Herman II, bought half of Bregenz for himself, just to sell it once more in 1525.
In 1525 the half of Bregenz was sold again to the Archduchy of Austria.
George II	unknown	1482–1544	March or 30 May 1544	Montfort-Pfannberg (1482–1524); Montfort-Peggau (1524–1544)	Catherine of Poland after 1522 one child	Sons of Herman II, ruled jointly. John was a canon in Salzburg.
Herman III	unknown	1482–1515	1515	Montfort-Pfannberg	Unmarried	Sons of Herman II, ruled jointly. John was a canon in Salzburg.
John III	unknown	1482–1483	c. 1483	Montfort-Pfannberg	Unmarried	Sons of Herman II, ruled jointly. John was a canon in Salzburg.
John IV	unknown	1491–1529	19 September 1529	Montfort-Rothenfels	Apollonia of Kirchberg before 1518 no children; Magdalena of Oettingen 23 June 1524 no children	Half-brothers, ruled jointly. John and his full brothers, Ulrich (who became Knight Hospitaller) and Henry (who became canon at Augsburg and Strasbourg) left no descendants and were succeeded by his nephews, sons of Hugo XI, their half-brother.
Ulrich VI	unknown	1491–1520	16 April 1520	Montfort-Rothenfels	Unmarried	Half-brothers, ruled jointly. John and his full brothers, Ulrich (who became Knight Hospitaller) and Henry (who became canon at Augsburg and Strasbourg) left no descendants and were succeeded by his nephews, sons of Hugo XI, their half-brother.
Henry VII	unknown	1491–1512	12 January 1512	Montfort-Rothenfels	Unmarried	Half-brothers, ruled jointly. John and his full brothers, Ulrich (who became Knight Hospitaller) and Henry (who became canon at Augsburg and Strasbourg) left no descendants and were succeeded by his nephews, sons of Hugo XI, their half-brother.
Hugo XI	unknown	1491–1519	24 April 1519	Montfort-Rothenfels	Anna of the Palatinate-Zweibrücken-Bitsch four children	Half-brothers, ruled jointly. John and his full brothers, Ulrich (who became Knight Hospitaller) and Henry (who became canon at Augsburg and Strasbourg) left no descendants and were succeeded by his nephews, sons of Hugo XI, their half-brother.
Ulrich VII The Younger	Before 1439	1495–1520	23 April 1520	Montfort-Tettnang	Magdalena of Oettingen; 24 February 1485 no children	Left no surviving descendants. Tettnang merged in Rothenfels.
William VII	c. 1485	1495–1509	8 January 1509	Montfort-Tettnang	Unmarried	Co-ruled with his father, but predeceased him.
In 1520 Tettnang was annexed by Rothenfels.
Hugo XII	c. 1500	1529–1564	21 November 1564	Montfort-Rothenfels	Maria Magdalena of Schwarzenberg before 1543 six children	Sons of Hugo XI, ruled jointly.
John V (II)	c. 1490	1529–1547	1547	Montfort-Rothenfels	Jeanne d'Arenberg c. 1535 no children	Sons of Hugo XI, ruled jointly.
Wolfgang I	unknown	1529–1541	21 March 1541	Montfort-Rothenfels	Eleonore of Wolfstein before 1523 no children	Sons of Hugo XI, ruled jointly.
Jacob	c. 1530	1544–1573	3 May 1572	Montfort-Peggau	Katharina Fugger; 9 February 1553 five children	
Ulrich VIII		1564–1575	6 April 1575	Montfort-Rothenfels	Ursula of Solms-Lich; 1559 two children	After his death, the county was annexed by the Barony of Konigsegg, depriving Ulrich's sons from succession.
In 1575 Rothenfels was annexed by the Barony of Königsegg.
John VI	c. 1557	1573–1619	21 February 1619	Montfort-Peggau	Sybilla Fugger; 4 October 1587; Augsburg three children	Sons of Jacob, ruled jointly.
Wolfgang II	unknown	1573–1596	1596	Montfort-Peggau	Unmarried	Sons of Jacob, ruled jointly.
George III	unknown	1573–1590	1590	Montfort-Peggau	Anna von Lobkowicz; 1584 no children	Sons of Jacob, ruled jointly.
Anton I	unknown	1573–1592?	1595	Montfort-Peggau	Unmarried?	Sons of Jacob, ruled jointly.
Hugo XIII	1 April 1599	1619–1662	2 July 1662	Montfort-Peggau	Johanna Euphroysne of Waldburg; 7 October 1618; Wolfegg four children	Sons of John VI, ruled jointly.
Herman IV	unknown	1619–1641	1641	Montfort-Peggau	Unmarried	Sons of John VI, ruled jointly.
John VII	unknown	1619–1623	1623	Montfort-Peggau	Unmarried	Sons of John VI, ruled jointly.
Anton II the Elder	14 October 1635	1662–1706	15 June 1706	Montfort-Peggau	Maria Victoria of Spauer-Flavon; 1670 two children	Sons of Hugo XIII, ruled jointly.
John VIII	25 November 1627	1662–1686	12 September 1686	Montfort-Peggau	Anna Eusebia of Königsegg 1655 one child; Maria Katharina of Sulz 12 August 1658 two children	Sons of Hugo XIII, ruled jointly.
Anton III	26 November 1670	1706–1733	17 December 1733	Montfort-Peggau	Maria Anna of Thun-Hohenstein; 16 May 1693 two children	Anton III, son of John VIII, shared rule with his cousin Sebastian, son of Anton II.
Sebastian	7 October 1684	1706–1728	6 February 1728	Montfort-Peggau	Unmarried	Anton III, son of John VIII, shared rule with his cousin Sebastian, son of Anton II.
Maximilian Joseph Ernest	20 January 1700	1733–1759	17 March 1759	Montfort-Peggau	Maria Antonia of Waldburg; 26 January 1722 one child	Son of Anton II.
Francis Xavier	3 November 1722	1759–1780	24 March 1780	Montfort-Peggau	Sophia Theresa Maximiliane of Limburg-Bronkhorst; 1 December 1758 no children	After his death the county was sold to Austria.
In 1780, Pfannberg was sold to the Archduchy of Austria

== Prince of Montfort ==
Arms of Jérôme Bonaparte as Prince of Montfort

In 1810, the Tettnang territory was adjudicated to the Kingdom of Württemberg. In 1816, King Frederick I vested his daughter Catharina and her husband Jérôme Bonaparte with the titles of Princess and Prince of Montfort (French: prince de Montfort). This princely title continued in the family by descent.

== See also ==
- Tettnang Castle
- Werdenberg

== Sources ==
- Burmeister, Karl Heinz: Montfort, von (Grafen von Montfort), Familienartikel in: Neue Deutsche Biographie, Bd. 18, S. 51-54
- Burmeister, Karl Heinz: Die Grafen von Montfort. Geschichte, Recht, Kultur. Festgabe zum 60. Geburtstag, hrsg. von Alois Niederstätter (= Forschungen zur Geschichte Vorarlbergs; NF 2). Universitätsverlag Konstanz, Konstanz 1996, ISBN 3-87940-560-3
- Burmeister, Karl Heinz; Kuhn, Elmar L., Moser, Eva u.a.: Die Grafen von Montfort. Geschichte und Kultur. (= Kunst am See; Band 8). Gessler, Friedrichshafen 1982, ISBN 3-922137-16-4
