= William, Margrave of Hachberg-Sausenberg =

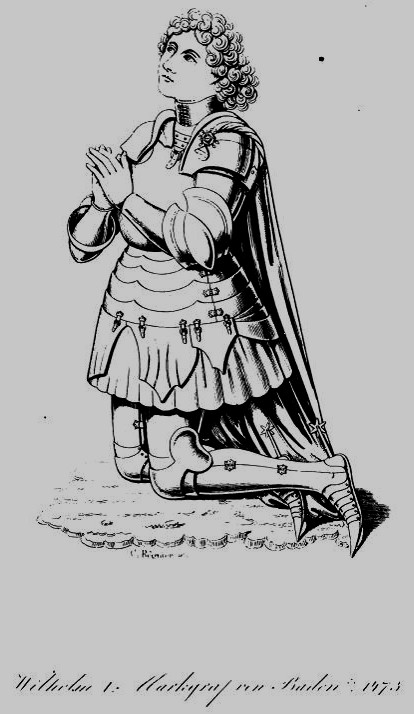
- William of Hachberg-Sausenberg - drawing on a wall painting in the cathedral of Constance
- Born: 11 July 1406
- Died: 15 August 1482
- Noble family: House of Zähringen
- Spouse: Elisabeth of Montfort-Bregenz
- Issue: Rudolf IV, Margrave of Hachberg-Sausenberg; Hugo, Margrave of Hachberg-Sausenberg
- Father: Rudolf III, Margrave of Hachberg-Sausenberg
- Mother: Anne of Freiburg-Neuchâtel

Margrave William of Hachberg-Sausenberg (11 July 1406 – 15 August 1482) was the ruling Margrave of Hachberg-Sausenberg, member of the branch of the House of Zähringen.

== Early life and ancestry ==
William was born as the son of Margrave Rudolf III of Hachberg-Sausenberg by his second wife, Countess Anna of Freiburg-Neuchâtel.

He ruled from 1428 to 1441, and abdicated on 21 June 1441 in favor of his infant sons, Rudolf IV and Hugo. As they were still infants, his cousin Count John of Freiburg-Neuchâtel took over the government as regent.

== Marriage and issue ==
William married Countess Elisabeth of Montfort-Bregenz (d. 1458), the daughter of the Count William VII of Montfort-Bregenz. His wife's relatives intervened because of his lavish lifestyle and he had to promise not to mortgage any assets from her dowry without their consent. Nevertheless, his lifestyle led to a divorce in 1436. They had at least three children: two sons, Rudolf IV and Hugo, who succeeded him, and a daughter, Ursula, who became the second wife of Count James Truchseß of Waldburg.

As William was constantly in debt and the pressure of his creditors increased, he found eventually that he could only keep his ancestral lands in the family by abdicating in favour of his sons.

== Construction activities ==
After his father had expanded Rötteln Castle, William dedicated himself to the expansion of Sausenburg Castle.

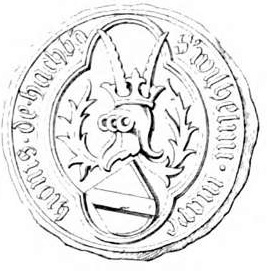
Seal of William margrave of Hachberg-Sausenberg.

== Expansion of the country's sovereignty ==
He bought in 1432 the low justice in Efringen, Kirchen, Eimeldingen, Holzen and Niedereggenen.

On 3 November 1437, Margrave William of Hachberg, in his capacity as bailiff, gave Cüne am Bühel rights to Waldshut, Guardian of the Abbess of Königsfelden Abbey, the third part of the grain tithe to Birkingen, the tithe to Eschbach and the wine tithe on Schönenbühel to Waldshut. He had boughts these rights from Albrecht Merler, who lived at Kadelburg. It is not known when he bought these rights.

== Diplomatic services ==
Via his cousin John of Freiburg-Neuchâtel, William gained access to the court of the Duke of Burgundy in Dijon. During the Council of Basel, he was called upon as mediator between Austria and Burgundy and later as mediator between Burgundy and France. In 1432, the Protector of the Council, Duke William III of Bavaria appointed William of Hachberg as acting head. In 1434, Duke Philip III of Burgundy, appointed him as councillor and Chamberlain.

In 1437, the Duke of Austria appointed him governor of the Austrian possessions in the Sundgau, Alsace and Freiburg. As governor of Further Austria, he was involved in the war between Emperor Frederick III and the Old Swiss Confederacy. After the Swiss defeated the Austrians in the Battle of St. Jakob an der Sihl in 1443, the Emperor sent William to King Charles VII of France to plea for help. France sent 40000mercenaries, the so-called Armagnacs.

== See also ==
- Margraviate of Baden
- Baden
- List of rulers of Baden

== Footnotes ==
William, Margrave of Hachberg-Sausenberg House of Zähringen Born: 1406 Died: 15 August 1482
Preceded by Rudolf III	Margrave of Hachberg-Sausenberg; 1428-1441	Succeeded by Rudolf IV
