= Hugo, Margrave of Hachberg-Sausenberg =

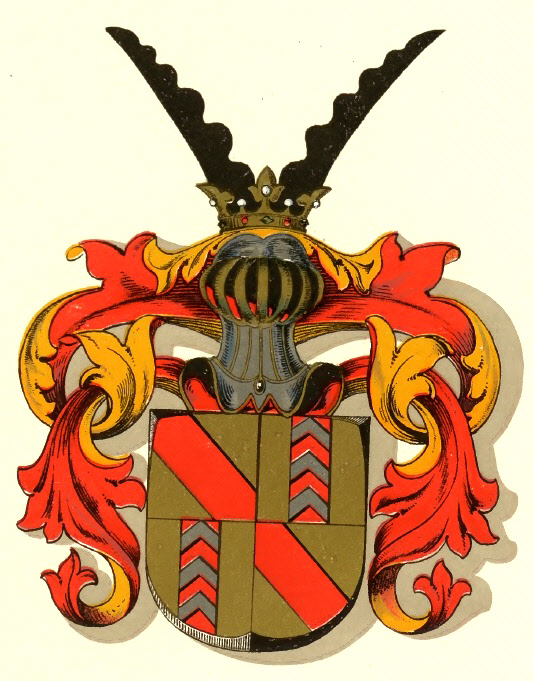
- Died: 1444
- Noble family: House of Zähringen
- Father: William, Margrave of Hachberg-Sausenberg
- Mother: Elisabeth of Montfort-Bregenz

Margrave Hugo of Hachberg-Sausenberg (died 1444) was the youngest son of Margrave William of Hachberg-Sausenberg and his wife, Elisabeth of Montfort-Bregenz. After his father died in 1441, he ruled jointly with his elder brother Rudolf IV.

Hugo died in 1444, after only three years as co-ruler. He did not have an heir; after his death, Rudolf IV ruled alone.
