= County of Feldkirch =

County in the Holy Roman Empire

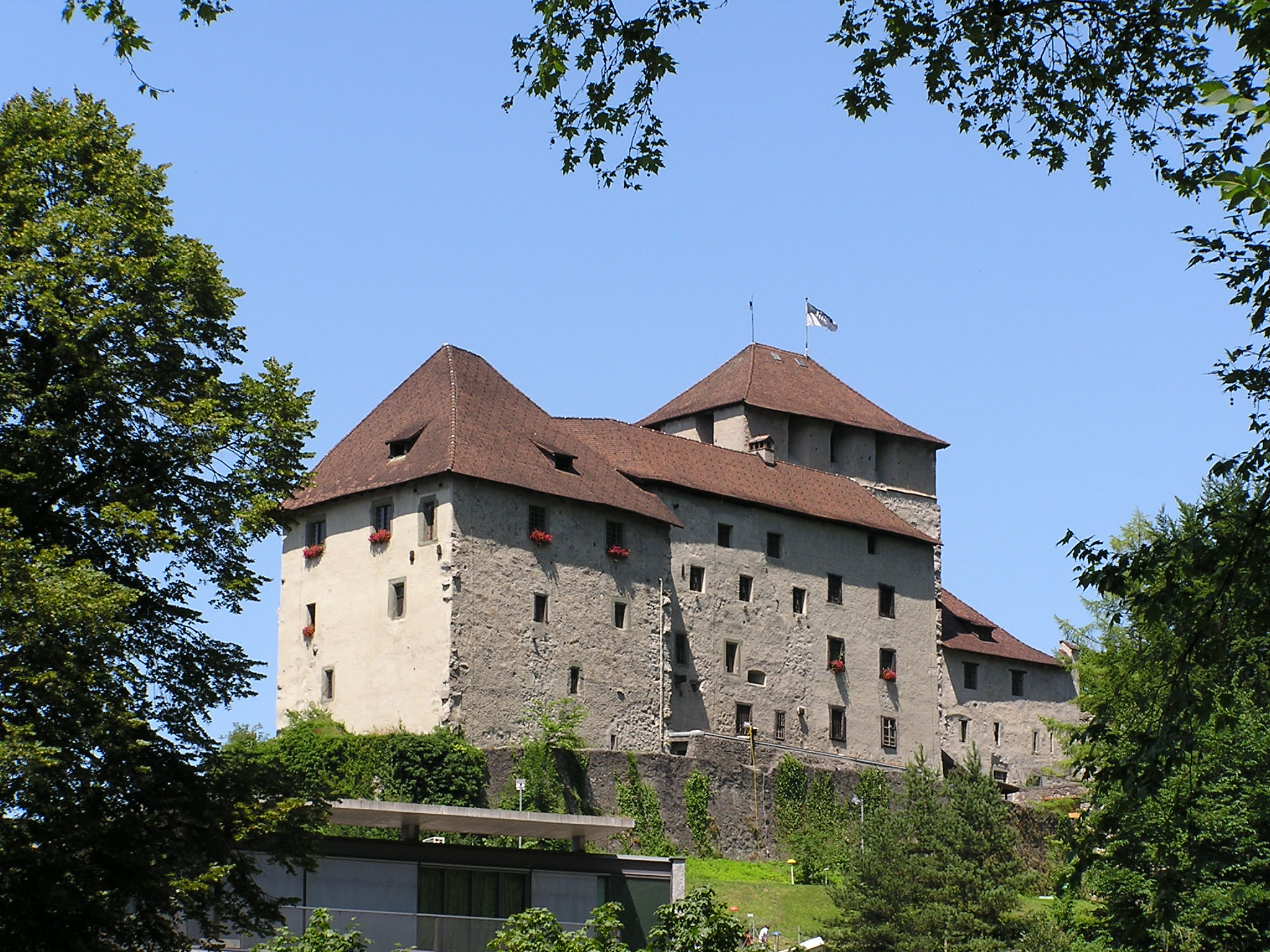
Schattenburg castle, former seat of the counts of Feldkirch

The County of Feldkirch was a county in the Holy Roman Empire. It was ruled by the Counts of Montfort from Schattenburg castle.

With the death of the last count Frederick VII. of Toggenburg in 1436 the county passed back under the suzerainty of the House of Habsburg.

The head of the House of Habsburg continued carrying the title of "Count of Feldkirch" in the grand title of the Emperor of Austria.
