= John of Freiburg =

Count of Neuchâtel from 1424 to 1458

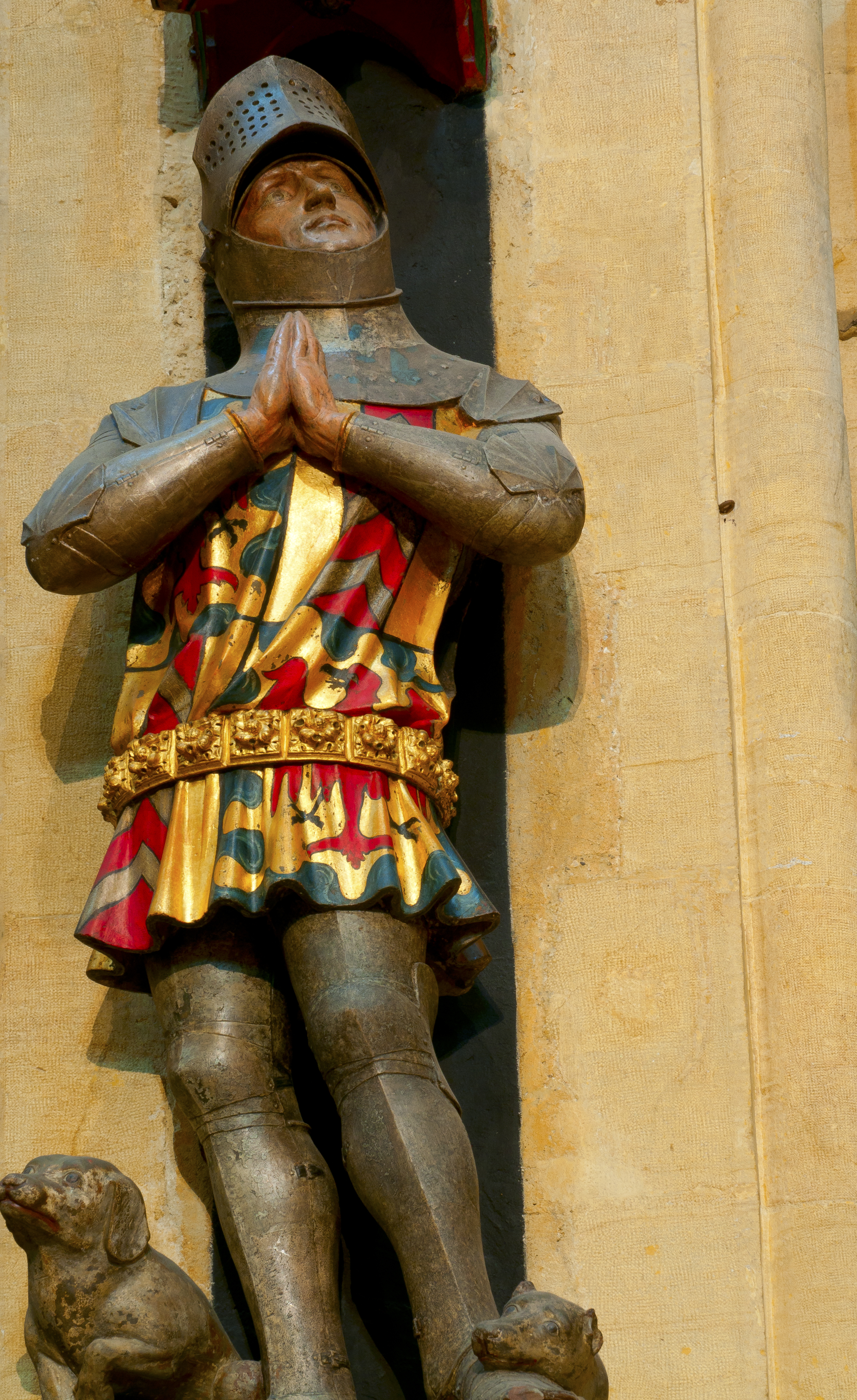
Statue of John at the cenotaph of the counts of Neuchâtel, in the Collegiate Church of Neuchâtel

John of Freiburg (German: Johann von Freiburg; French: Jean de Fribourg; 26 May 1396 – 19 February 1458) was Count of Neuchâtel from 1424 until his death.

== Biography ==
John was born in Neuchâtel on 26 May 1396, the son of Conrad IV of Freiburg, Count of Neuchâtel, and Marie of Vergy. He married Marie de Chalon, daughter of John III of Chalon-Arlay, between 1416 and 1419. As a result of his marriage to Marie, his suzerain Louis II of Chalon-Arlay's sister, John began a military career in the service of the Dukes of Burgundy. He was imprisoned in Montereau, near Paris, upon the assassination of John the Fearless in 1419, along with the duke's entourage.

John became Count of Neuchâtel upon his father's death in 1424. He became a member of Duke Philip the Good's household, as well as a councilor and governor general in Burgundy, and served as an ambassador of the canton of Bern to the Burgundian court. Knighted in 1430 and appointed Marshal of Burgundy in 1440, John successfully campaigned against the écorcheurs, who were ravaging Burgundian territory. He played a major role in the negotiations between the Duke of Burgundy and the King of the Romans, the future Emperor Frederick III, in 1442.

In 1443, John resigned as marshal but nevertheless took up arms for the Bernese against Austria, concluding a peace treaty between the two parties in Konstanz in 1446. He arbitrated a conflict between Guillaume d'Avenches, Schultheiß of Fribourg, and Louis, Duke of Savoy in 1447. One of John's most notable acts as count was the renewal of Neuchâtel's city charter on 12 February 1455. Having no male heir, he designated his cousin Rudolf of Hachberg as his successor. John died in Neuchâtel on 19 February 1458.
