= Burg Festenburg =

Castle in Styria, Austria

Coordinates: 47°27′47.00″N 15°54′54.50″E

- Styria, Austria
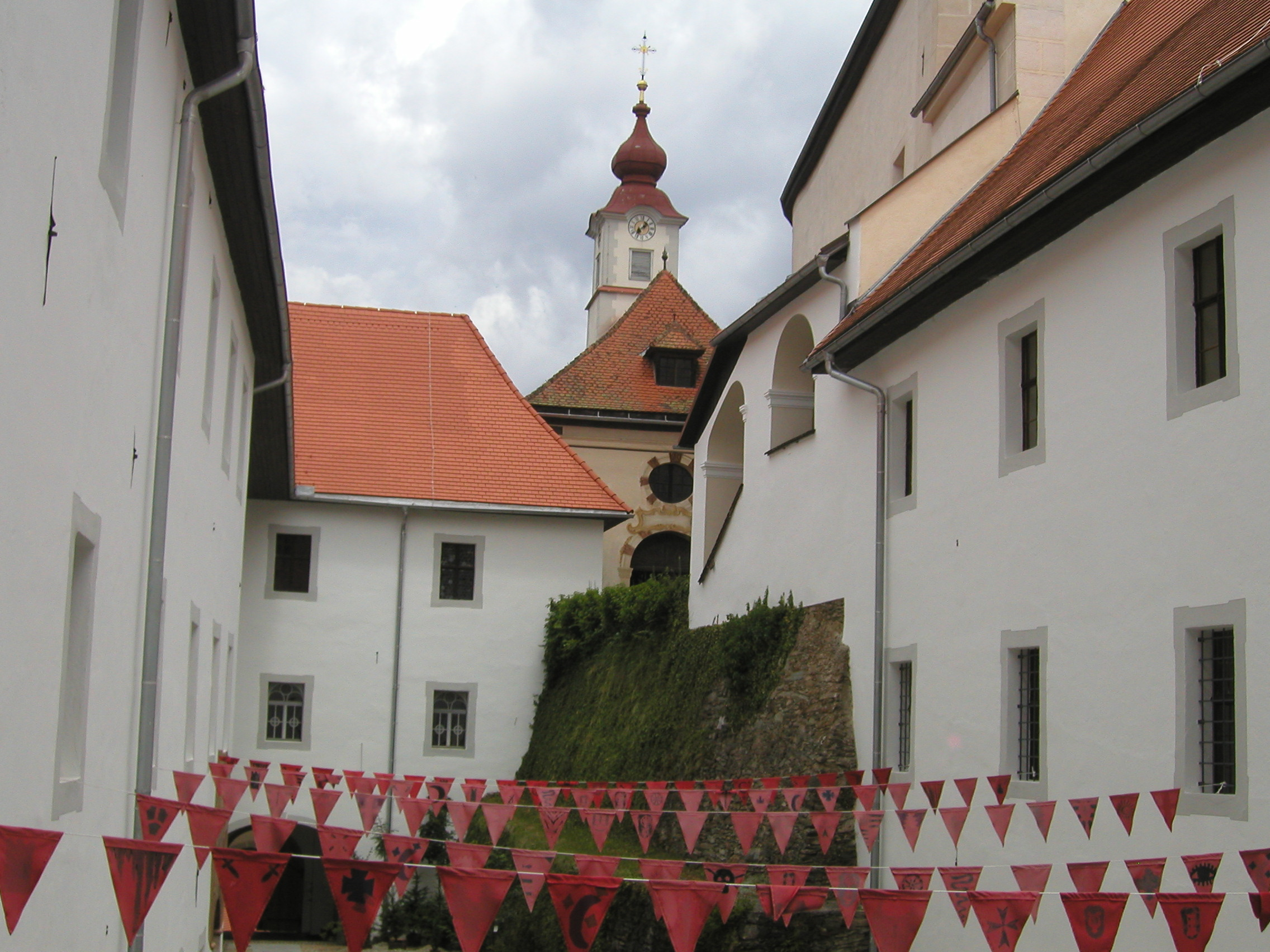

Site information
- Type: Monastery castle

Site history
- Built: around 1200

Burg Festenburg is a castle in Styria, Austria. It is located in the village of Festenburg in the municipality of St. Lorenzen am Wechsel. It was founded around 1200 by the Lords of Stubenberg as Vöstenburg. It now houses the Roman Catholic parish church of St. Katharina.

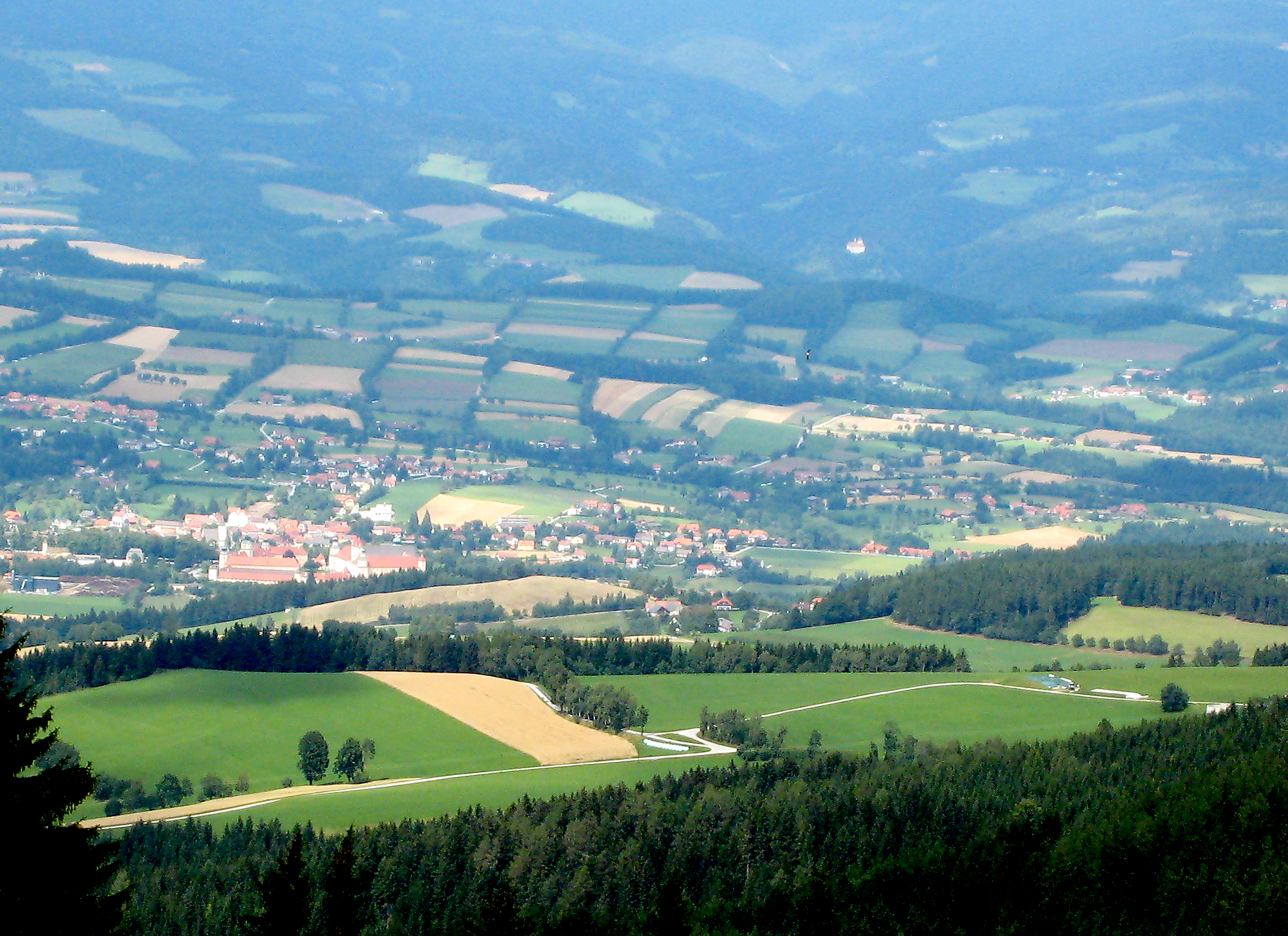
View from the south, Festenburg Castle in the back

== History ==
The castle was founded around 1200 by the Lords of Stubenberg. The castle was unsuccessfully besieged by the Turks in 1529 and 1532 during the First Turkish Siege of Vienna.

In 1616, the Vorau Abbey under Provost Daniel Gundau bought the fortress from the Counts of Saurau and expanded the castle from 1700 to 1723 into a monastery.

== Modern day ==
From 1889 to 1928, the canon Ottokar Kernstock lived as a pastor and writer in the Festenburg. His reception, work and bedroom are publicly accessible as a museum.

Today, the Holy Mass is celebrated on Sundays, Tuesdays and Fridays. The concert of the traditional band Festenburg im Burghof takes place every year.

The castle is open to visitors from May to September from Monday to Sunday with guided tours. During the anniversary year there was also a special exhibition "Periods" 1616–2016, which showcased the 400 years of the Festenburg belonging to the Abbey of Vorau.

== Parish Church of St. Catherine ==
The knight's hall of the castle was transformed into the parish church that Saint Catherine was consecrated. Johann Cyriak Hackhofer from Vorau painted inside the church.

Holy Mass is celebrated today on Sundays, Tuesdays, and Fridays. The Trachtenkapelle Festenburg concert is held annually in the castle courtyard.

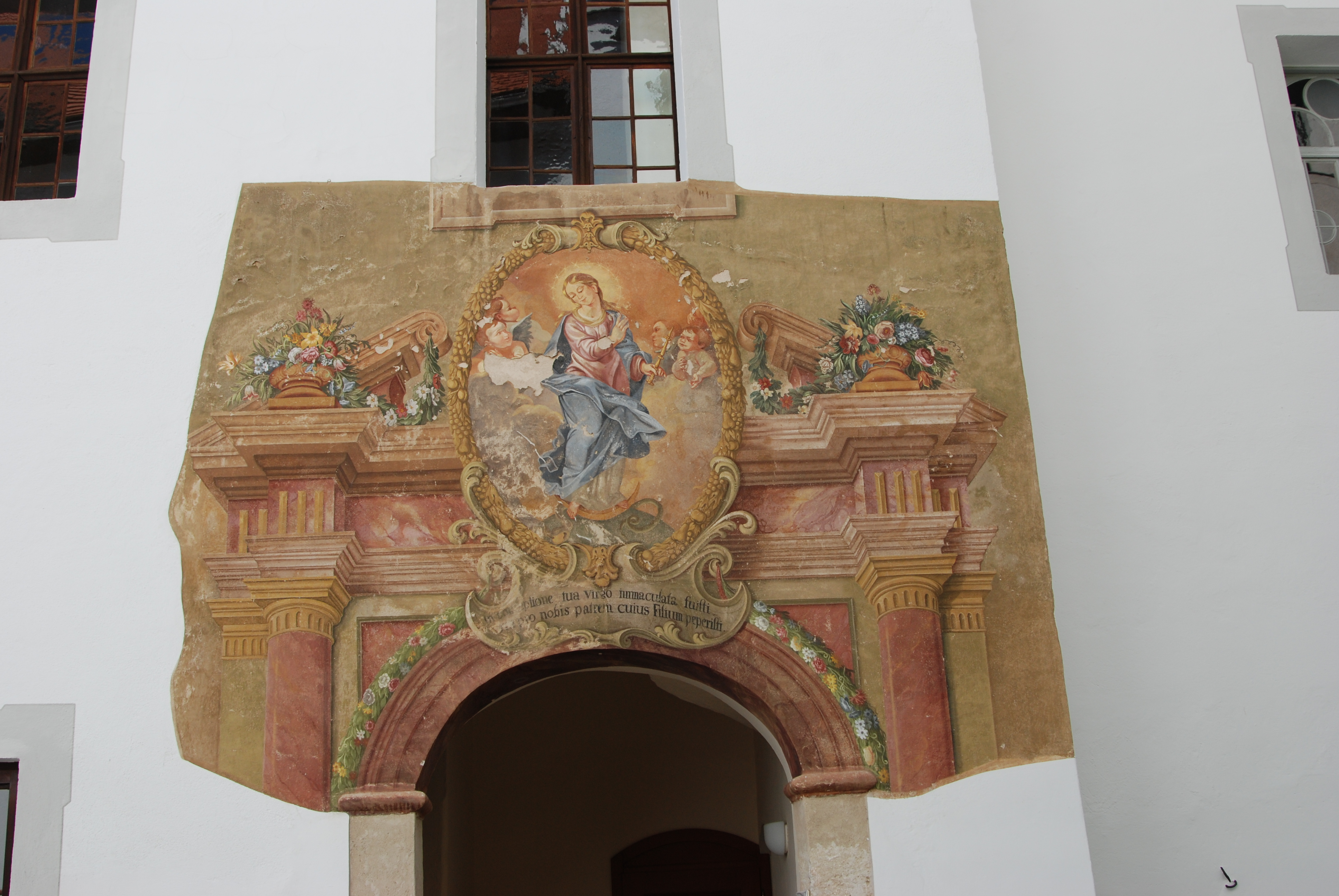
Entrance in the courtyard

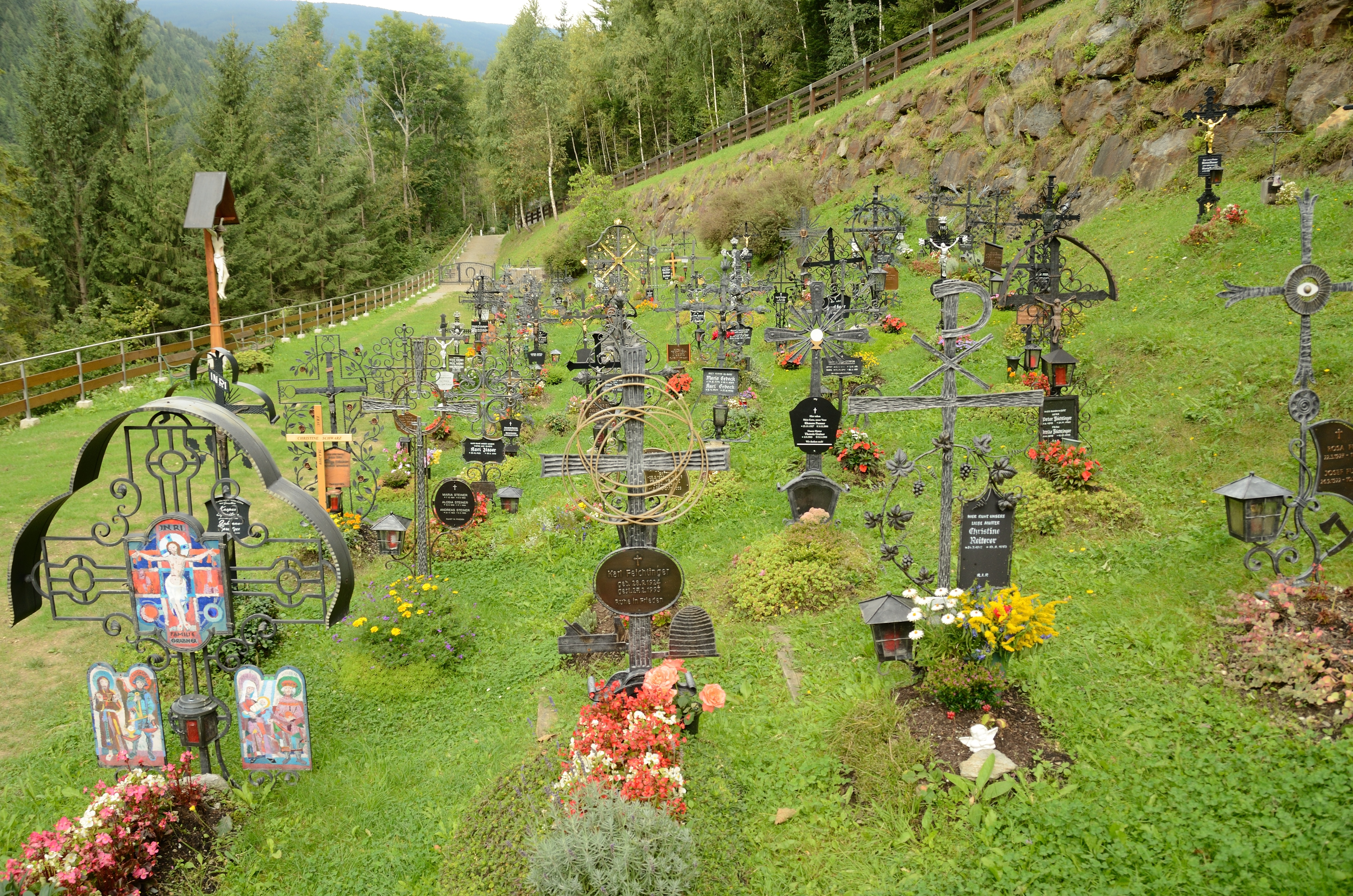
Mountain cemetery

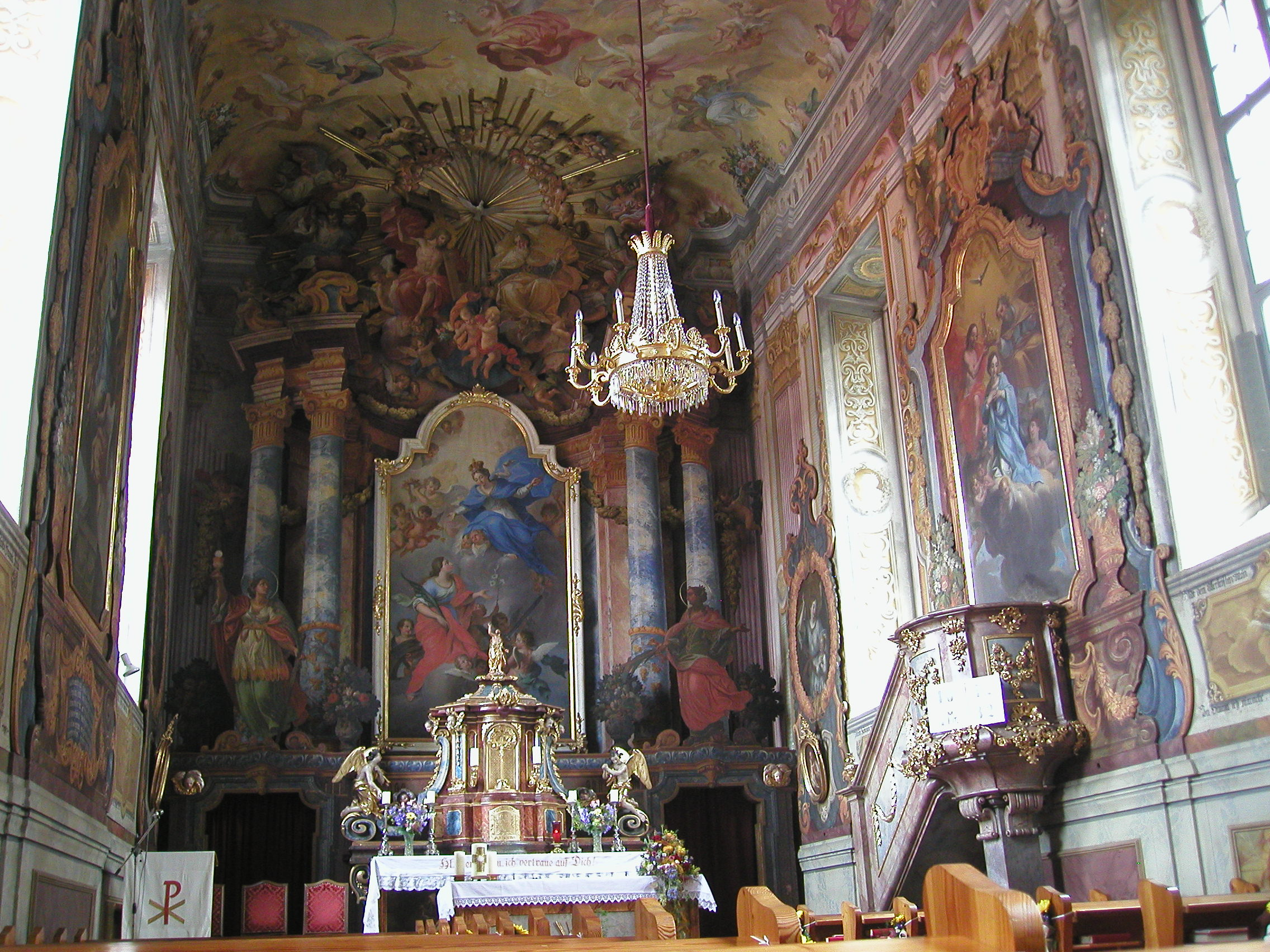
St. Catherine's Church

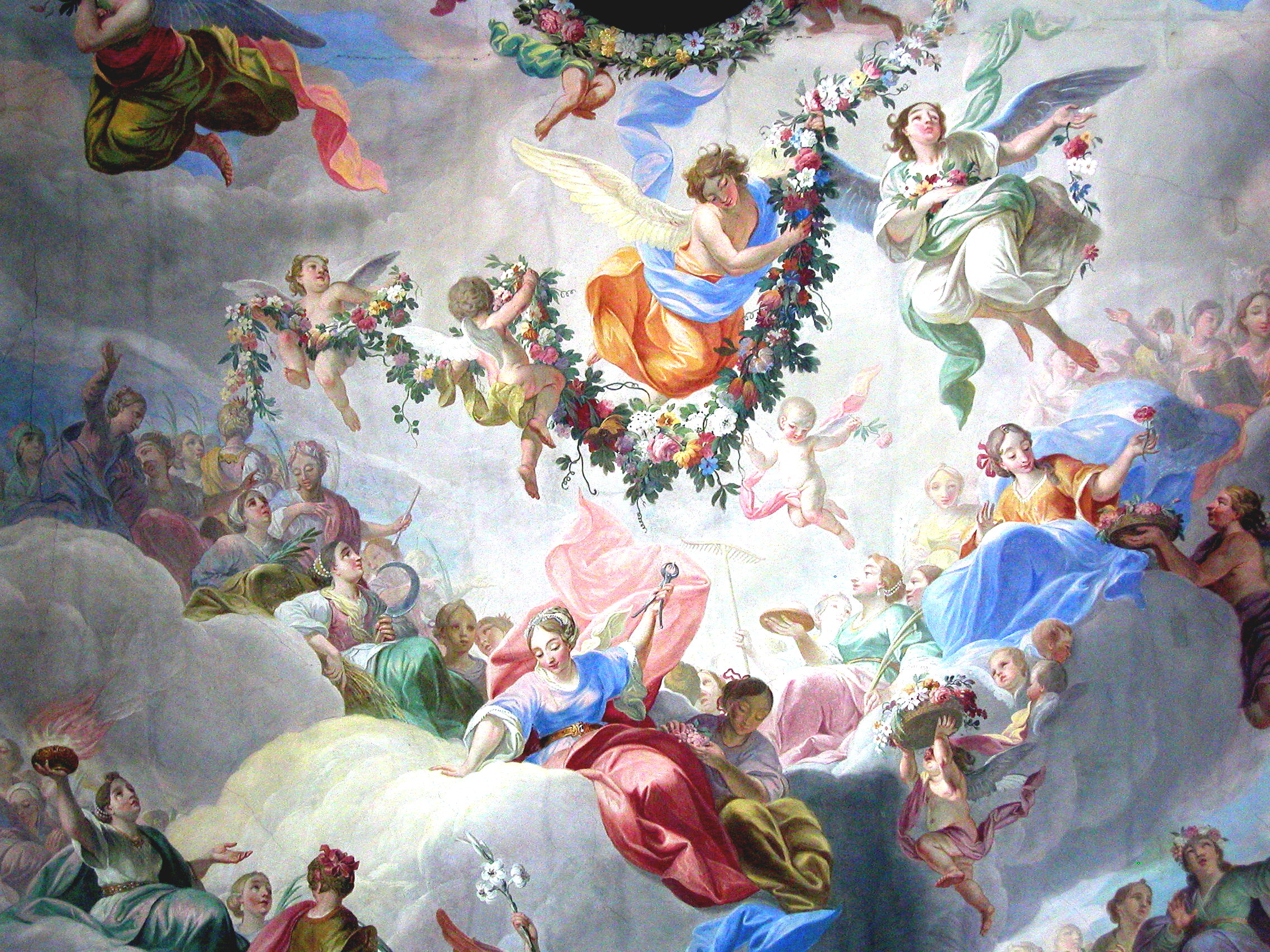
Frauenhimmel by Johann Cyriak Hackhofer

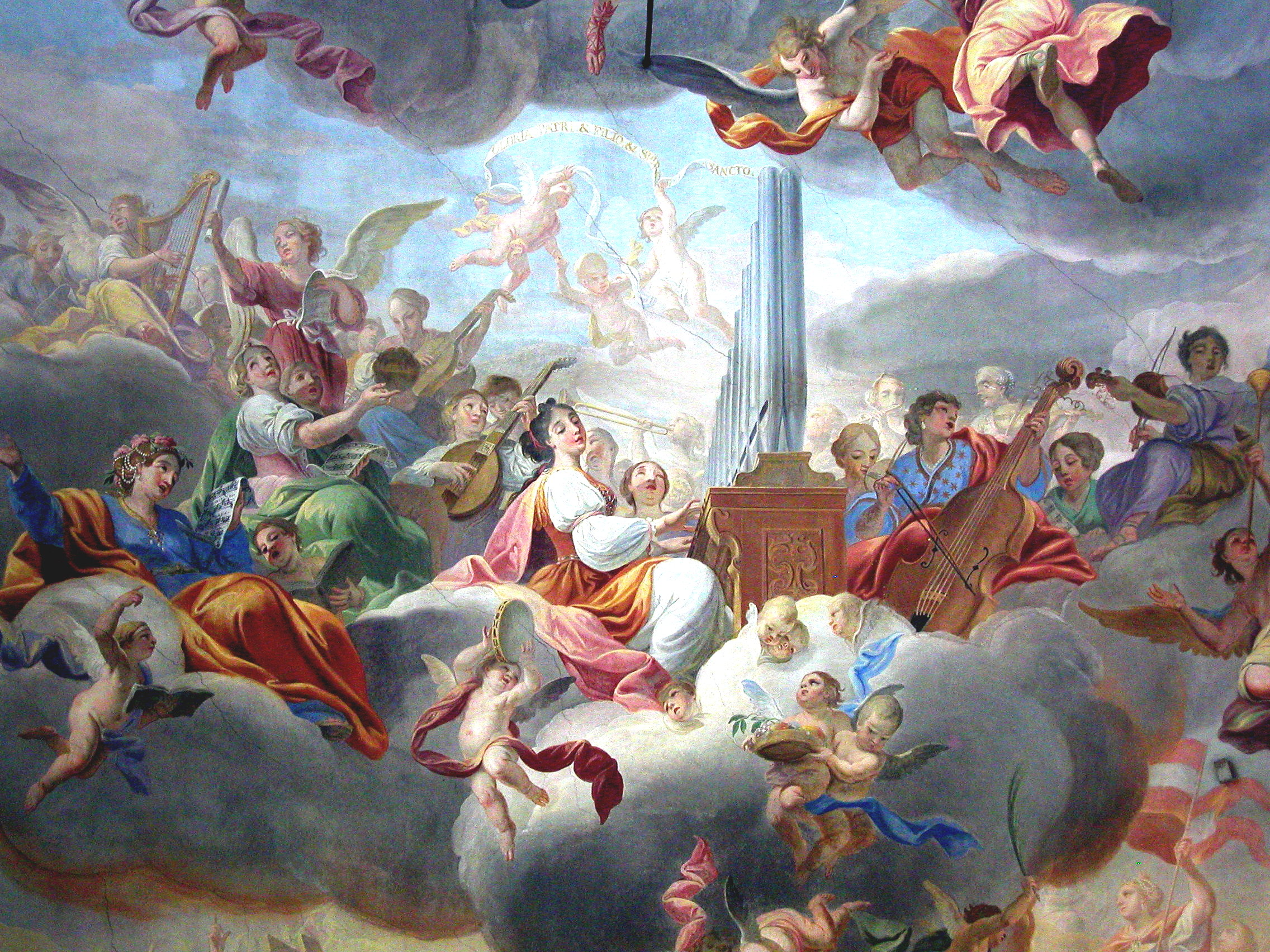
Fresco by Johann Cyriak Hackhofer

== See also ==
- List of castles in Austria
