= Schattenburg =

Castle, museum and restaurant in Feldkirch, Vorarlberg, Austria

Coordinates: 47°14′11″N 9°35′58″E

- Feldkirch, Vorarlberg, Austria
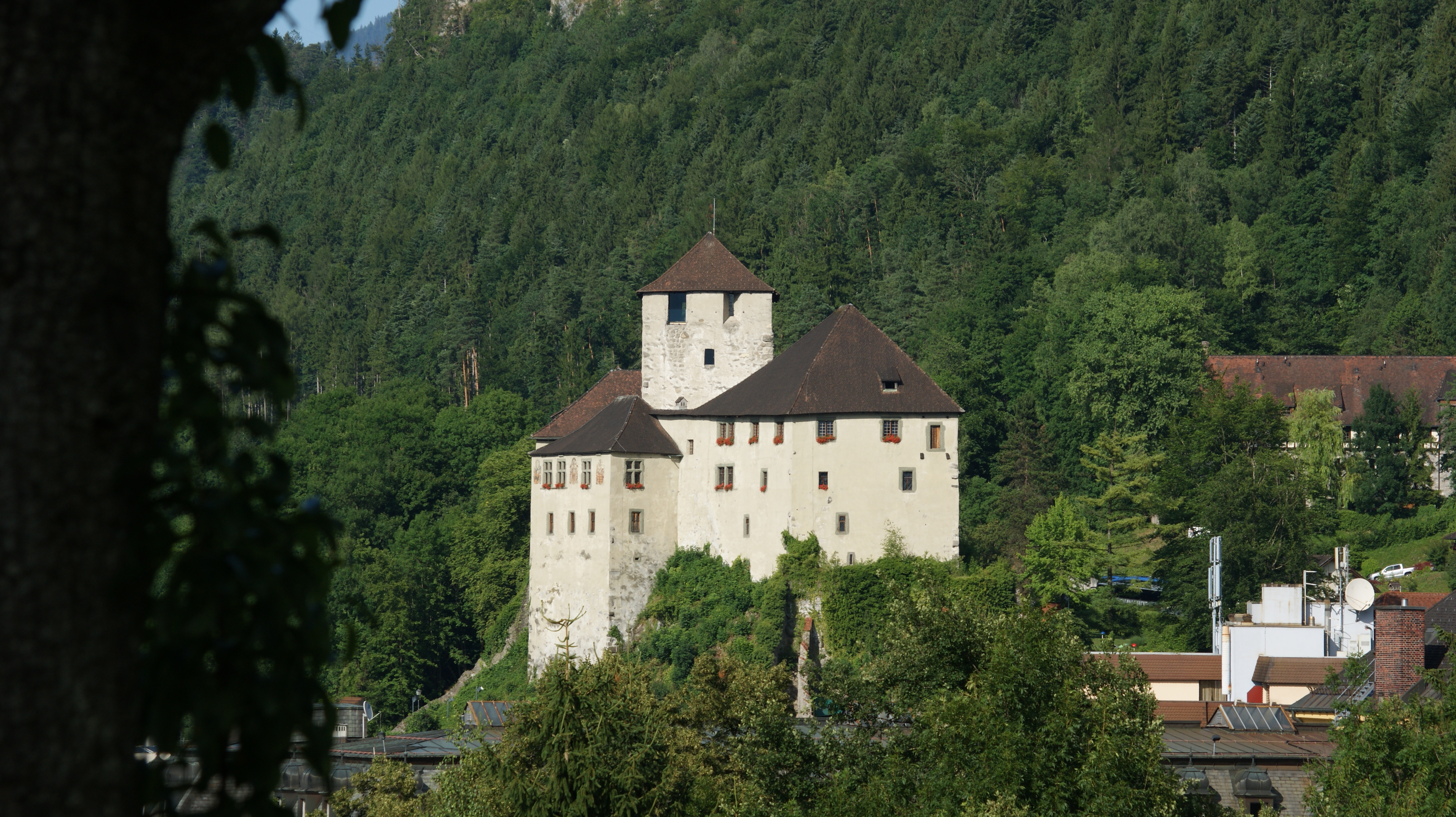
- View of the Schattenburg

Site information
- Type: Castle
- Open to the public: yes

Site history
- Built: ca. 1200
- Built by: Hugo I. of Montfort

Schattenburg is a castle, museum, and restaurant in Feldkirch, Vorarlberg (Austria). Schattenburg is 480 metres (1,570 ft) above sea level..

Its name is assumedly derived from the word stem "schatte, schad" meaning "protection, shield".

== History ==
Hugo I. of Montfort, founder of the town of Feldkirch, built the castle around 1200. The various Dukes of Montfort live here until 1390. Afterwards, the castle was sold to the Habsburgs.

The Schattenburg has been owned by the city since 1825. Feldkirch bought it for more than 800 guilders at the time, which roughly corresponds to the value of eight good tournament horses at the time.

Over the years, the castle has undergone several wars and suffered some damage, but it has been constantly renovated. Today, it is one of the best preserved medieval castles in Central Europe.

== The Schattenburg museum ==
The museum offers a total of eighteen museum rooms on three floors. Each room is dedicated to a different aspect of Feldkirch's city history and leads visitors back in time. Weapons from the Middle Ages to the World War II are on display in the castle guard.

In 2017, more than 30,000 people visited the museum. The castle houses a restaurant next to the museum.

== See also ==
- List of castles in Austria
- List of museums in Vorarlberg
