= Peggau =

- Municipality
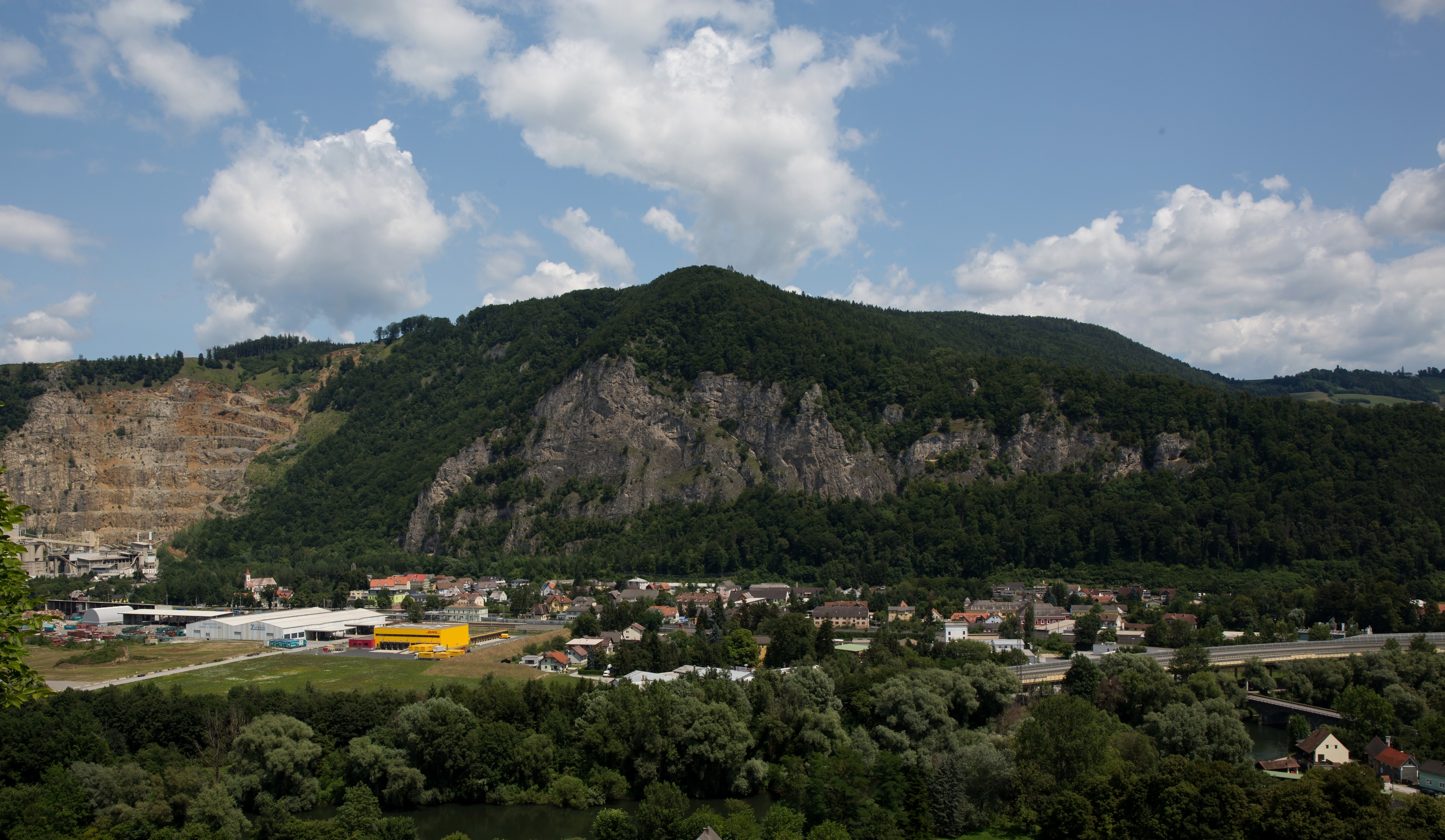

- Coat of arms

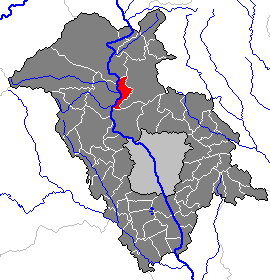
- Location within Graz-Umgebung district

- Location within Austria
- Coordinates: 47°12′23″N 15°20′39″E
- Country: Austria
- State: Styria
- District: Graz-Umgebung

Government
  - Mayor: Christoph Pirstinger (Heimatliste)

Area
  - Total: 11.21 km^{2} (4.33 sq mi)
- Elevation: 410 m (1,350 ft)

Population (2018-01-01)
  - Total: 2,199
  - Density: 196.2/km^{2} (508.1/sq mi)
- Time zone: UTC+1 (CET)
  - Summer (DST): UTC+2 (CEST)
- Postal code: 8120
- Area code: 03127
- Vehicle registration: GU
- Website: www.peggau. steiermark.at

Peggau is a municipality in the district of Graz-Umgebung in the Austrian state of Styria.

== Population ==
Historical population
Year	Pop.	±%
1869	669	—
1880	753	+12.6%
1890	809	+7.4%
1900	806	−0.4%
1910	1,026	+27.3%
1923	1,183	+15.3%
1934	1,163	−1.7%
1939	1,119	−3.8%
1951	1,536	+37.3%
1961	1,713	+11.5%
1971	1,918	+12.0%
1981	1,966	+2.5%
1991	2,063	+4.9%
2001	2,171	+5.2%
