= Burgruine Pfannberg =

Castle in Austria

Coordinates: 47°15′17″N 15°19′46″E

- Styria, Austria
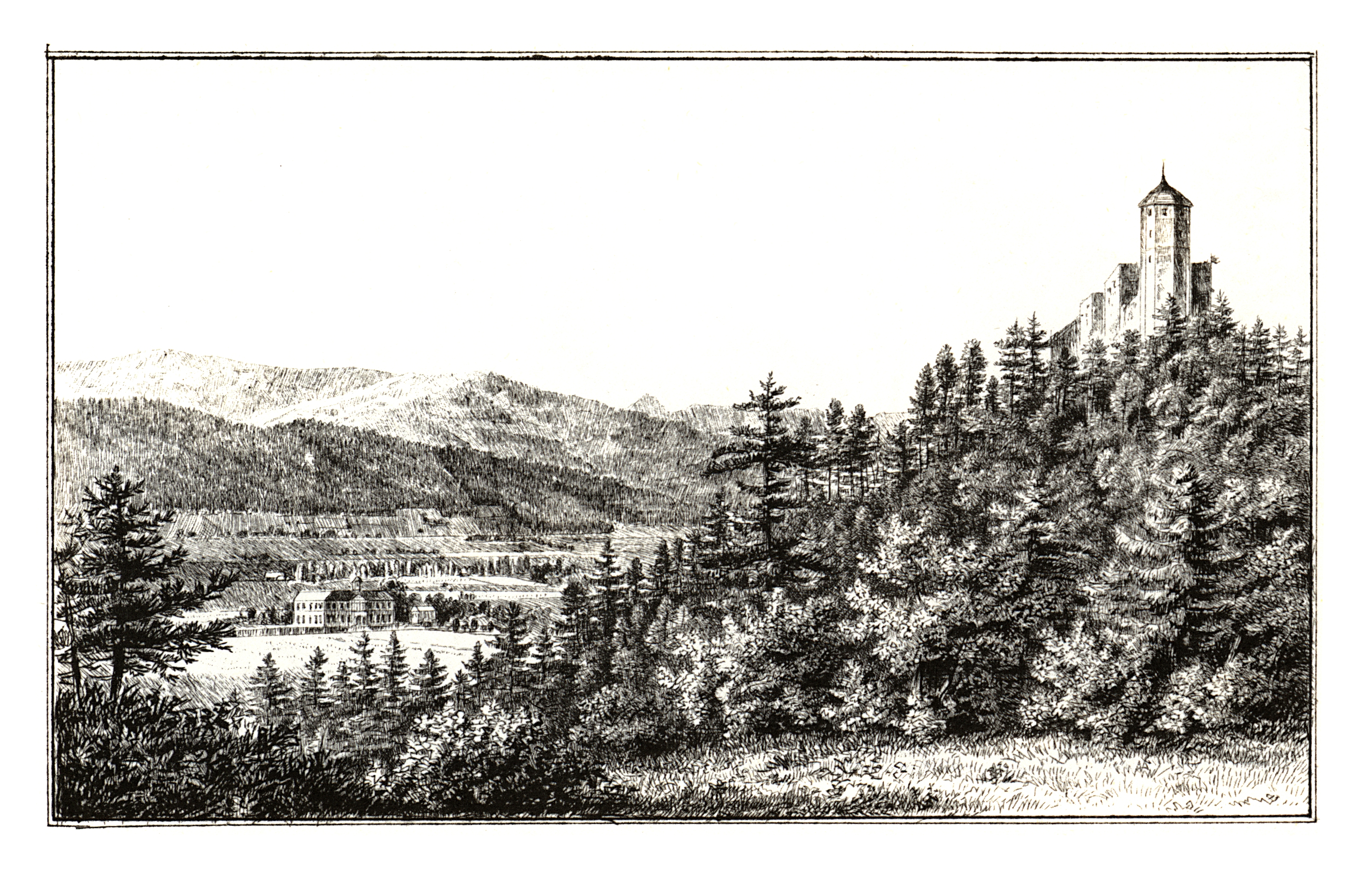

Site information
- Type: Hill castle

Site history
- Built: early 13th century

Burgruine Pfannberg is a castle in Styria, Austria.

== See also ==
- List of castles in Austria
- VR-Tour through the castle ruins on burgen.erhartc.net
