= List of nobles and magnates within the Holy Roman Empire in the 13th century =

The Holy Roman Empire was a claimed “successor state” to Charlemagne's Carolingian empire along with France and several other realms. The empire was a lot larger than modern day Germany and included the modern day countries Austria, the low countries, large parts of Eastern France, Northern Italy, Slovenia, parts of the northern Baltic, and Switzerland. Although the main culture was Germanic, this was not necessarily a single cultural identity and there were large differences in local dialect. Additionally many foreign cultures had influence on the culture and language of the border territories (France, Italy, Poland, Denmark, Hungary). The structure of the nobility is complicated in that many different titles were used across the empire and do not necessarily mean the same thing in different contexts. It is also complicated because the number of lords holding land directly from the Emperor is so high and each of these lordships functioned as a semi-independent state pursuing their own interests. The vassals of the Emperor would generally have vassals of their own such as Knights, Castellans, and Ministerialis. Occasionally they would have lords as their vassals if they were powerful enough. Sometimes a knight or lord would act as a vogt (an advocate) for a prelate or prince-bishop (a bishop who owns a large fief and has secular rights). These vogts would be responsible for leading the bishops troops and administering justice by the sword (giving them quite a bit of power). Many of the German nobles did not practice primogeniture and had their estates split between their male heirs, though often they worked together in their common interests.

holy Roman empire coat of arms in 13thcentury

The 13th century was a particularly fragmented time in the history of the Holy Roman Empire due to the great interregnum (1245-1275). Even with one Emperor who had enough land and power to wield kingly power the Holy Roman Empire was split into hundreds of fiefdoms whose holders were often at war with each-other. Although the Empire started off as probably the greatest power in Europe, at the time under Frederick II, Holy Roman Emperor who ruled the duchy of Swabia, the kingdom of Sicily, and the kingdom of Jerusalem, Imperial power slowly disintegrated as the pope encouraged anti-kings to curb Frederick's power due to his invasions into northern Italy. When Frederick died in 1250 there were two claimants to the throne: his son Conrad IV, and William II of Holland supported by the pope. Both of these kings died before 1257 and left a massive power vacuum which foreign royalty sought to use to become Emperor (Richard of Cornwall, Alfonso X). Richard of Cornwall was very rich and was able to gain four votes using bribes. He was crowned King of the Romans in Aachen by the Archbishop of Cologne in 1257 while Alfonso never even set foot in Germany. After Richards death in 1272 the powerful Swabian expansionist Count Rudolf I of Germany was elected emperor and reigned until 1291. Following his death the count of Nassau Adolf, King of the Romans took over as king of the Romans. However he was deposed in 1298 by a coalition of powerful nobles spearheaded by the King of Bohemia, the Archbishop of Cologne, and the Margrave of Brandenburg for his aggressive policy in Thuringia. The previous King Rudolf's son Albert I of Germany was elected and the Interregnum finally ended.

== Emperors and emperor claimants ==
The rulers of the Holy Roman Empire were crowned in the city of Aachen as King of the Romans (or King of Germany) by the archbishops of Cologne. Under normal circumstances they would also be crowned as Emperor by the Pope but throughout most of the thirteenth century this was not the case.

House of Hohenstaufen	House of Welf	House of Thuringia	House of Plantaganet	House of Holland	House of Ivrea	House of Habsburg	House of Nassau
Philip of Swabia (1198–1208)	Otto IV, Holy Roman Emperor (1198–1215)	Henry Raspe, Landgrave of Thuringia (1246–1247)	Richard of Cornwall (1257–1272)	William II of Holland (1247–1256)	Alfonso X of Castile (1257–1275)	Rudolf I of Germany (1272–1291)	Adolf, King of the Romans (1292–1298)
Frederick II, Holy Roman Emperor (1212–1250)						Albert I of Germany (1298–1308)	
Henry (VII) of Germany (1220–1235)							
Conrad IV of Germany (1237–1254)							

== Lords with imperial immediacy ==
The Holy Roman empire was essentially a confederacy of rulers who theoretically owed allegiance to the Emperor who was elected from the 7 prince-electors. From the start of the 13th century there was a dispute between the House of Welf and the House of Hohenstaufen over who was the rightful ruler of the empire which resulted in a fractured empire for most of the 13th century. The main political players within the Holy Roman Empire were the prince-electors, anointed kings, princes, and other palatine lords who wielded large amounts of influence on their vassals and also their smaller neighbors. They were also direct vassals of the emperor himself and possessed palatine powers. The regions listed are purely for contextualization and do not reflect exactly how the medieval world would have necessarily made their provincial divisions. The regions are alphabetically ordered and the princes are listed in order of precedence.

Within Bavaria	1st	2nd	3rd	4th	5th	6th	7th	8th
Dukes of Bavaria	Louis I, Duke of Bavaria (1183–1231)	Otto II, Duke of Bavaria (1231–1253) [From here split to]						
Dukes of Upper Bavaria	Louis II, Duke of Bavaria (1253–1294)	Rudolf I, Duke of Bavaria (1294–1319)						
Dukes of Lower Bavaria –	Henry XIII, Duke of Bavaria (1253–1290)	Otto III, Duke of Bavaria (1290–1312)						
Counts of Rheuss				Heinrich II 1217–1231				
Prince-Provosts of Berchtesgaden	Hugo II 1201–1210	Konrad Garrer 1210–1211	Friedrich II Ellinger 1211–1217	Friedrich III of Ortenburg 1231–1239	Bernhard II 1239–1252	Heinrich III 1252–1257	Konrad III von Medling 1257–1283	Johann I Sachs von Sachsenau 1283–1303
Prince-Archbishops of Salzburg	Eberhard II of Regensburg (1200–1246)	Philip of Spanheim	Ulrich of Sekau (1256–1265)	Ladislaus of Salzburg (1265–1270)	Frederick II of Walchen (1270–1284)	Rudolf of Hoheneck (1284–1290)	Conrad IV of Breitenfurt (1291–1312)	
Prince-Bishops of Eichstatt	Hartwich I von Hirschberg 1195–1223	Heinrich I von Ziplingen 1225–1229	Heinrich II von Tischlingen 1229-1234	Friedrich II von Parsberg 1237–1246	Heinrich IV von Württemberg, 1246–1259	Hildebrand von Morn 1261–1279	Reimbrecht von Mulenhard 1279–1297	Konrad II von Pfaffenhausen 1297–1305
Prince-Bishops of Regensberg	Konrad III of Laichling (1196–1204)	Konrad IV of Frontenhausen (1204–1227), Siegfried (1227–1246)	Albert I of Pietengau (1247–1260)	Albertus Magnus (1260–1262)	Leo Thundorfer (1262–1277)	Heinrich II von Rotteneck (1277–1296)	Konrad V von Luppurg (1296–1313)	
Abbots of Ursberg								
Abbots of Waldsassen								

=== Within Bohemia ===
Kings of Bohemia – Ottokar I of Bohemia (1292-1230), Wenceslaus I of Bohemia (1230–1253), Ottokar II of Bohemia (1253–1278), Wenceslaus II of Bohemia (1278–1305)

=== Within Burgundy ===
Counts of Burgundy – Otto I, Duke of Merania (1208–1231), Otto III, Count of Burgundy (1231–1248), Adelaide, Countess of Burgundy (1248–1279), Hugh, Count of Burgundy (1248–1266 by right of his wife), Philip I, Count of Savoy (1267–1279), Otto IV, Count of Burgundy (1279–1303)

Counts of Albon & Dauphins of Viennois – Beatrice of Albon (1162–1228), Guigues VI of Viennois (1228–1237), Guigues VII of Viennois (1237–1269), John I of Viennois (1269–1282), Humbert I of Viennois (1282–1307)

Principality of Orange – William I of Baux (1180–1218), William II of Baux (1180–1239), William III of Baux (1239–1257), Raymond I of Baux (1218–1282), Bertrand IV of Baux (1282–1314)

Counts of Provence – Alfonso II, Count of Provence (1185–1209),

Counts of Geneva – Humbert I of Geneva (1195–1220), William II of Geneva (1220–1252), Rudolf of Geneva (1252–1265), Aymon II of Geneva (1265–1280), Amadeus II of Geneva (1280–1308)

Counts of Savoy – Thomas, Count of Savoy (1189–1233), Amadeus IV, Count of Savoy (1233–1253), Boniface, Count of Savoy (1253–1263), Peter II, Count of Savoy (1263–1268), Philip I, Count of Savoy (1268–1285), Amadeus V, Count of Savoy (1285–1323)

Counts of Montbeliard – Richard III of Montfaucon (1195–1227), Theodoric III of Montbéliard (1227–1283), Guillemette of Neufchâtel (1283–1317)

Prince-Bishops of Besançon – Amadeus de Tramelay (1197–1220), Gerard I. de Rougemont 1221–1225, John Halgren of Abbeville (1225–1227), Nicolas de Flavigny 1227–1235, Gottfried II. 1236–1241, Jean II. 1242–1244, Guillaume II. de la Tour 1245–1268, Odo de Rougemont 1269–1301

=== Within Carinthia ===
Dukes of Carinthia – Bernhard von Spanheim (1202–1256), Ulrich III, Duke of Carinthia (1256–1269), Ottokar II of Bohemia (1269–1276), Rudolf I of Germany (1276–1286), Meinhard, Duke of Carinthia (1286–1295), Henry of Bohemia (1295–1335)

Patriarchs of Aquileia – Pellegrino II of Aquileia (1195–1204), Wolfger von Erla (1204–1218), Berthold (patriarch of Aquileia) (1218–1251), Gregorio di Montelongo (1251–1269), Philip of Spanheim (1269–1273), Raimondo della Torre (1273–1299)

Dukes of Austria – Leopold VI, Duke of Austria (1198–1230), Frederick II, Duke of Austria (1230–1246), (Interregnum (1246–1278), Rudolf IV, Duke of Austria (1278–1282), Albert I of Germany (1282–1308)

Margraves of Verona – Herman V, Margrave of Baden-Baden (1190–1243), Ezzelino III da Romano (1223–1233), Herman VI, Margrave of Baden (1243–1250), Frederick I, Margrave of Baden (1250–1268)

Dukes of Merania & Margraves of Istria – Berthold, Duke of Merania (1188–1204), Henry II, Margrave of Istria (1204–1228), Otto I, Duke of Merania (1228–1234), Otto III, Count of Burgundy (1234–1248)

=== Within Frisia ===
Counts of Flanders – Baldwin I, Latin Emperor (1194–1205), Joan, Countess of Flanders (1205–1244), Margaret II, Countess of Flanders (1244–1278), Guy, Count of Flanders (1278–1305)

Counts of Holland – Dirk VII, Count of Holland (1190–1203), Ada, Countess of Holland (1203–1207), William I, Count of Holland (1203–1222), Floris IV, Count of Holland (1222–1234), William II of Holland (1239–1256), Floris V, Count of Holland (1246–1296), John I, Count of Holland (1296–1299)

Prince-Bishops of Utrecht – Dirk van Are (1197–1212), Otto I (bishop of Utrecht) (1212–1215), Otto II van Lippe (1216–1227), Wilbrand van Oldenburg (1227–1233), Otto III van Holland (1233–1249), Gozewijn van Amstel (van Randerath) (1249–1250), Henry I van Vianden (1250–1267), John I, Bishop-Elect of Utrecht (1267–1290), John II van Sierck (1290–1296), Willem II Berthout (1296–1301)

Counts of Guelders – Otto I, Count of Guelders (1182–1207), Gerard III, Count of Guelders (1207–1229), Otto II, Count of Guelders (1229–1271), Reginald I, Count of Guelders (1271–1318)

Duchy of Limburg – Henry III, Duke of Limburg (1165–1221), Waleran III, Duke of Limburg (1221–1226), Henry IV, Duke of Limburg (1226–1247), Waleran IV, Duke of Limburg (1247–1279), Reginald I of Guelders (1280–1288), John I, Duke of Brabant (1288–1294), John II, Duke of Brabant (1294–1312)

=== Within Franconia ===
Counts-Palatine of the Rhine – Henry V, Count Palatine of the Rhine (1195–1213), Henry VI, Count Palatine of the Rhine (1213–1214), Louis I, Duke of Bavaria (1214–1231), Otto II, Duke of Bavaria (1228–1253), Louis II, Duke of Bavaria (1255–1271), Rudolf I, Duke of Bavaria (1294–1317)

Archbishops of Mainz – Siegfried II (archbishop of Mainz) (1200–1230), Siegfried III (archbishop of Mainz) (1230–1249), Christian II (archbishop of Mainz) (1249–1251), Gerhard I von Daun-Kirberg 1251–1259, Werner II von Eppstein 1260–1284, Heinrich II von Isny 1286–1288, Gerhard II von Eppstein 1286–1305

Burgraves of Nuremberg – Frederick I, Burgrave of Nuremberg (1192–1204), Frederick IV, Count of Zollern (1204–1218), Conrad I, Burgrave of Nuremberg (1218–1262), Frederick III, Burgrave of Nuremberg (1262–1297), John I, Burgrave of Nuremberg (1297–1300)

Landgraves of Thuringia – Hermann I, Landgrave of Thuringia (1190–1217), Louis IV, Landgrave of Thuringia (1217–1227), Hermann II, Landgrave of Thuringia (1227–1241), Henry Raspe, Landgrave of Thuringia (1241–1247), Henry III, Margrave of Meissen (1247–1265), Albert II, Margrave of Meissen (1265–1294), Frederick I, Margrave of Meissen (1298–1323)

Prince-Bishops of Wurzburg – Konrad von Querfurt (1197–1202), Heinrich IV von Katzburg (1202–1207), Otto von Lobdeburg (1207–1223), Dietrich von Homburg (1223–1225), Hermann I von Lobdeburg (1225–1254), Iring von Reinstein-Homburg (1254–1266), Heinrich V von Leiningen (1254–1255), Poppo III von Trimberg (1266–1271), Berthold I von Henneberg (1271–1274), Berthold II von Sternberg (1274–1287), Mangold von Neuenburg (1287–1303)

Prince-Bishops of Worms – Luitpold von Schonfeld (1196–1217), Henry II of Saarbrücken (1217–1234), Landolf of Hoheneck (1234–1247), Konrad III von Durkheim (1247), Richard of Dhaun (1247–1257), Eberhard I of Baumberg (1257–1277), Friedrich of Baumberg (1277–1283), Simon von Schoneck (1283–1291), Eberhard II von Strahlenberg (1291–1293), Emicho of Baumberg (1294–1299)

Prince-Abbots of Corvey -

Prince-Abbots of Fulda -

=== Within Italy ===
Kings of Sicily – Frederick II, Holy Roman Emperor (1198–1250), Henry II of Sicily (1212–1217 joint rule), Conrad IV of Germany (1250–1254), Conradin (de jure 1254–1268), Manfred, King of Sicily (de facto as rival 1258–1266), Charles I of Anjou (as usurper, leaves HRE 1266–1282), Peter III of Aragon (1282–1285), James II of Aragon (1285–1295), Frederick III of Sicily (1285–1337)

Dukes of Spoleto – Conrad II, Duke of Spoleto (1198–1205), Henry von Urslingen (1205), Dipold, Count of Acerra (1209–1225), Rainald of Urslingen (1223–1230), Conrad III, Duke of Spoleto (1227–1267), Rainald of Urslingen (1251–1276)

Kings of Sardinia – Enzo of Sardinia (1238–1245)

Imperial-Vicar of Tuscany – Frederick of Antioch (1246–1250)

=== Within lower Lorraine ===
Archbishops of Cologne – Adolf of Altena (1192–1205), Bruno IV von Sayn (1205–1208), Dietrich I von Hengebach (1208–1215), Engelbert II of Berg (1216–1225), Heinrich I von Müllenark (1225–1237), Konrad von Hochstaden (1238–1261), Engelbert II von Falkenburg (1261–1274), Siegfried II of Westerburg (1274–1297), Wigbold von Holte (1297–1304)

Duchy of Brabant – Henry I, Duke of Brabant (1190–1235), Henry II, Duke of Brabant (1235–1248), Henry III, Duke of Brabant (1248–1261), Henry IV, Duke of Brabant (1261–1267), John I, Duke of Brabant (1267–1294), John II, Duke of Brabant (1294–1312)

Prince-Bishops of Liege – Hugh of Pierrepont (1220–1229), John of Eppes (1229–1238), William of Savoy (1238–1239), Robert of Thourotte (1240–1246), Henry of Guelders (1247–1274), John of Enghien (1274–1281), John of Flanders (1282–1291), Hugh of Chalon (1295–1301)

Prince Bishops of Cambrai – Guiard of Laon (1238–1248), Ingeramus de Crequy (1274–1286), Guillaume de Hainault (1286–1296), Gui de Collemedio (1296–1306)

Counts of Cleves – Arnold II, Count of Cleves (1198–1201), Dietrich V, Count of Cleves (1201–1260), Dietrich VI, Count of Cleves (1260–1275), Dietrich VII, Count of Cleves (1275–1305)

Counts of Julich – William III, Count of Jülich (1207–1219), William IV, Count of Jülich (1219–1278), Walram, Count of Jülich (1278–1297), Gerhard V of Jülich (1297–1328)

Abbots of Echternach -

=== Within Lombardy ===
Archbishops of Milan – Filippo I da Lampugnano (1196–1206), Umberto IV da Pirovano (1206–1211), Gerardo da Sesso (1211–1212), Enrico I da Settala (1213–1230), Guglielmo I da Rizolio (1230–1241), Leon da Perego (1241–1257), Ottone Visconti (1262–1295), Ruffino da Frisseto (1295–1296), Francesco I da Parma (1296–1308)

Prince bishops of Trent – Federico Wanga (1207–1218), Gerard I Oscasali (1223–1232), Aldrighetto di Castelcampo (1232–1247), Egno von Eppan (1250–1273), Henry II (1273–1289), Philipp Buonacolsi (1289–1303)

Prince Bishops of Brixen -

=== Within the northeastern marches ===
Margraves of Brandenburg – Otto II, Margrave of Brandenburg (1184–1205), Albert II, Margrave of Brandenburg (1205–1220), John I, Margrave of Brandenburg (1220–1266), Otto III, Margrave of Brandenburg (1220–1267)

Brandenburg-Stendal – John II, Margrave of Brandenburg-Stendal (1266–1282), Otto IV, Margrave of Brandenburg-Stendal (1266–1309), Henry I, Margrave of Brandenburg-Stendal (1294–1318)

Brandenburg-Salzwedel – John III, Margrave of Brandenburg-Salzwedel (1267–1268), Otto V, Margrave of Brandenburg-Salzwedel (1267–1298), Otto VI, Margrave of Brandenburg-Salzwedel (1267–1286), Albert III, Margrave of Brandenburg-Salzwedel (1267–1300)

Teutonic Order – Heinrich von Tunna (1208–1209), Hermann von Salza (1209–1239), Konrad von Thüringen (1239–1240), Gerhard von Malberg (1240–1244), Heinrich von Hohenlohe (1244–1249), Gunther von Wüllersleben (1249–1252), Poppo von Osterna (1252–1256), Anno von Sangershausen (1256–1273), Hartmann von Heldrungen (1273–1282), Burchard von Schwanden (1282–1283), Konrad von Feuchtwangen (1290–1297), Gottfried von Hohenlohe (1297–1303)

Dukes of Pomerania – Bogislaw VIII, Duke of Pomerania (1264–1278), Bogislaw IV (1278–1295), Barnim II (1295), Otto I, Duke of Pomerania (1295–1344)

Dukes of Pomerania-Demmin – Casimir II, Duke of Pomerania (1187–1219), Wartislaw III, Duke of Pomerania (1219–1264)

Dukes of Pomerania Stettin – Bogislaw II, Duke of Pomerania (1208–1220), Barnim I (1226–1264)

Dukes of Pomerania Schlawe-Stolp -Bogislaw III, Duke of Pomerania (1190–1223), Ratibor II (1223–1238),

Prince-Bishops of Ratzeburg – Isfried 1180–1204, Philipp 1204–1215, Heinrich I 1215–1228, Lambert von Barmstede 1228, Gottschalk 1229–1235, Petrus 1236, Ludolph I of Ratzeburg 1236–1250, Friedrich 1250–1257, Ulrich von Blücher 1257–1284, Konrad 1284–129, Hermann von Blücher 1291–1309

Counts of Lichtenburg -

=== Within Saxony ===
Margrave of Miessin – Theodoric I, Margrave of Meissen (1198–1221), Henry III, Margrave of Meissen (1230–1288), Albert II, Margrave of Meissen (1288–1292), Frederick I, Margrave of Meissen (1291–1323)

Dukes/Princes of Brunswick-Luneburg – Otto I, Duke of Brunswick-Lüneburg (1235–1252), Albert I, Duke of Brunswick-Lüneburg (1252–1279), John, Duke of Brunswick-Lüneburg (1269–1277), Otto II, Duke of Brunswick-Lüneburg (1282–1330), Henry I, Duke of Brunswick-Grubenhagen (1279–1322)

Archbishops/Administrators of Bremen – Hartwig of Uthlede (1192–1207), Burchard of Stumpenhusen (1207–1210), Valdemar of Denmark (bishop) (1210–1217), Gerard of Oldenburg-Wildeshausen (1210–1219), Gerhard II (Bremen & Hamburg) (1219–1258), Hildebold of Wunstorf (1258–1273), Gilbert of Bronckhorst (1274–1306)

Archbishops of Magdeburg – Ludolf of Koppenstedt (1192–1205), Albert I of Käfernburg (1205–1232), Burkhard I of Woldenberg (1232–1235), Wilbrand of Kasernberg (1235–1254), Rudolf of Dinselstadt (1254–1260), Rupert of Mansfeld (1260–1266), Conrad II of Sternberg (1266–1277), Günther I of Schwalenberg (1277–1279), Bernhard III of Wolpe (1279–1282), Eric of Brandenburg (1282–1295), Burkhard II of Blankenburg (1295–1305)

Princes of Anhalt – Bernhard, Count of Anhalt (1170–1212), Henry I, Count of Anhalt (1212–1252)

Princes of Anhalt-Aschersleben – Henry II, Prince of Anhalt-Aschersleben (1252–1266), Henry III, Prince of Anhalt-Aschersleben (1270–1283), Otto I, Prince of Anhalt-Aschersleben (1270–1304)

Princes of Anhalt-Bernburg – Bernhard I, Prince of Anhalt-Bernburg (1252–1287), Bernhard II, Prince of Anhalt-Bernburg (1287–1323)

Princes of Anhalt-Zerbst – Siegfried I, Prince of Anhalt-Zerbst (1252–1298), Albert I, Prince of Anhalt-Zerbst (1298–1316)

Counts of Mark – Adolf I, Count of the Mark (1198–1249), Engelbert I, Count of the Mark (1249–1277), Eberhard II, Count of the Mark (1277–1308)

Prince-Bishops of Bamberg – Thimo von Lyskirch (1196–1201), Konrad von Ergersheim (1202–1203), Ekbert of Andechs (1203–1231), Siegfried von Öttingen (1231–1238), Poppo of Andechs (1238–1242), Heinrich I von Bilversheim (1242–1257), Ladislaus of Salzburg (1257), Berthold von Leiningen (1257–1285), Mangold von Neuenburg (1285), Arnold von Solms (1286–1296), Leopold I von Grundlach (1296–1303)

Prince-Bishops of Osnabruck – Engelbert I von Isenberg (1224–1226), Konrad I von Velber (1227–1239), Engelbert I von Isenberg (1239–1250), Bruno von Isenberg (1251–1258), Balduin von Rüssel (1259–1264), Widukind von Waldeck (1265–1269), Konrad von Rietberg (1270–1297), Ludwig von Ravensberg (1297–1308)

Abbots of Walkried -

=== Within Swabia ===
Dukes of Swabia – Philip of Swabia (1198-1208), Frederick II, Holy Roman Emperor (1212–1216), Henry (VII) of Germany (1216–1235), Conrad IV of Germany (1235–1254), Conradin (1254–1268)

Margraves of Baden-Baden – Herman V, Margrave of Baden-Baden (1190–1243), Herman VI, Margrave of Baden (1243–1250), Frederick I, Margrave of Baden (1250–1268), Rudolf I, Margrave of Baden-Baden (1250–1288), Herman VII, Margrave of Baden-Baden (1288–1291), Rudolf II, Margrave of Baden-Baden (1288–1295), Rudolf III, Margrave of Baden-Baden (1288–1332), Hesso, Margrave of Baden-Baden (1288–1297)

Count-Palatines of Tübingen – Rudolph I, Count Palatine of Tübingen (~1200-1219), Rudolph II, Count Palatine of Tübingen (1219–1247), Hugo IV, Count Palatine of Tübingen (1247~1270)

Margraves of Baden-Pforzheim – Herman VIII, Margrave of Baden-Pforzheim (1291–1300), Rudolf IV, Margrave of Baden-Pforzheim (1291-1248)

Margraves of Baden-Eberstein – Frederick II, Margrave of Baden-Eberstein (1291–1333)

Margraves of Baden-Hachberg – Henry I, Margrave of Baden-Hachberg (1190–1231), Henry II, Margrave of Baden-Hachberg (1231–1289), Henry III, Margrave of Baden-Hachberg (1289–1330)

Margraves of Baden-Hachberg-Sausenburg – Rudolf I, Margrave of Hachberg-Sausenberg (1290–1313)

Prince-Bishops of Basel – Leuthold I von Rotheln (1192–1213), Walther von Rotheln (1213–1215), Heinrich II von Thun (1216–1238), Leuthold II von Arburg (1238–1249), Berthold II von Pfirt (1250–1262), Heinrich III von Neuenburg-Erguel (1262–1274), Heinrich IV Knoderer (1275–1286), Peter I Reich von Reichenstein (1286–1296), Peter von Aspelt (1297–1306)

Prince-Bishops of Augsburg – Hartwig II (Augsburg) (1202–1208), Siegfried III. von Rechberg (1208–1227), Siboto von Seefeld (1227–1247), Hartmann of Dillingen (1248–1286), Siegfried IV von Algertshausen (1286–1288), Wolfhard von Roth (1288–1302)

Prince-Bishops of Constance – Diethelm von Krenkingen (1190–1206), Wernher von Staufen (1206–1209), Konrad von Tegerfelden (1209–1233), Heinrich von Tanne (1233–1248), Eberhard II von Waldburd-Thann (1248–1274), Rudolf von Habsburg-Laufenburg (1274–1293), Henrich von Klingenberg (1293–1306)

Dukes of Teck – Adalbert II, Duke of Teck, Conrad II of Teck (~1260-1292)

Counts of Wurttemberg – Hartmann, Count of Württemberg (1181–1236), Ludwig III, Count of Württemberg (1194–1226), Ulrich I, Count of Württemberg (1241–1265), Ulrich II, Count of Württemberg (1265–1279), Eberhard I, Count of Württemberg (1279–1325)

Counts of Eberstein -

Landgraves of Hesse – Henry I, Landgrave of Hesse (1264–1308)

Abbots of Comburg -

Abbots of Disentis -

Abbots of Ellwangen -

Abbots of Weissenau -

Abbots of Bachau -

=== Within upper Lorraine ===
Archbishops or Trier – John I, Archbishop of Trier (1189–1212), Theoderich von Wied (1212–1242), Arnold II von Isenburg (1242–1259), Heinrich I Finstingen (1260–1286), Bohemond I (archbishop of Trier) (1286–1299)

Counts/Princes of Luxemburg – Ermesinde, Countess of Luxembourg (1197–1247), Theobald I, Count of Bar (1197–1214), Waleran III of Limburg (1214–1226), Henry V, Count of Luxembourg (1247–1281), Henry VI, Count of Luxembourg (1281–1288), Henry VII, Holy Roman Emperor (1288–1313)

Prince-Bishops of Metz -

Abbots of Burtscheid -

Within Provence

Counts of Provence -

== Sub-Vassals ==
=== Within Bavaria ===
==== Under the Teutonic Order ====
Bailiffs of An der Etsch

==== Under the dukes of Bavaria ====
Abbots of Diessen -

=== Within Bohemia ===
==== Under the kings of Bohemia ====
Dukes/Margraves of Moravia – Vladislaus III, Duke of Bohemia (1197–1222), Vladislaus II of Moravia (1223–1227), Přemysl (1227–1239), Vladislaus III of Moravia (1239–1247), Ottokar II of Bohemia (1247–1278), Rudolph I of Germany (1278–1283), Wenceslaus II of Bohemia (1283–1305)

Dukes of Troppau – Nicholas I, Duke of Troppau (1269–1318)

Lords of Krumlov – Vitek II (1194–1236), Zavis (d. 1257) (1236–1257), Budivoj z Krumlova (1257–1277), Wok z Krumlova (1277–1302)

=== Within Burgundy ===
==== Under the Teutonic Order ====
Bailiffs of Alsace -

==== Under the counts of Montbeliard ====
Lords of Grandvillars (Herrschaft Villars)

==== Under the counts of Savoy ====
Lords of Gruyeres

==== Under the prince-bishops of Basel ====
Lords of Rotteln

=== Within Carinthia ===
==== Under the patriarchs of Aquileia ====
Lords of Colloredo-Mansfeld -

Lords of Friuli

=== Within Frisia ===
==== Under the counts of Guelders ====
Lords of Myllendonk till 1279 transfer to Cologne

Lords of Vianden

=== Within Franconia ===
==== Under the landgraves of Thuringia ====
Lords of Hatzfeld

=== Within lower Lorraine ===
==== Under the archbishops of Cologne ====
Lords of Bassenheim – Bruno II of Isenburg-Braunsberg (~1210~1255), Waldbott von Waltmannshausen (~1255~1300)

Lords of Beilstein – (1268–1361)

Bishops of Paderborn

Lords of Ulmen/Rheineck

==== Under the counts of Cleves ====
Lords of Gemen

Lords of Moers

==== Under the dukes of Brabant ====
Lords of Gemert

==== Under the prince-bishops of Liege ====
Lords of Mechelen

=== Within the northeastern Marches ===
==== Under the margraves of Brandenburg ====
Counts of Wernigerode – Albert III of Wernigerode (1173–1214), Burchard of Wernigerode (1217–1231), Conrad I of Wernigerode (1217–1252), Gebhard I of Wernigerode (1217–1269), Conrad II of Wernigerode (1254–1293), Albert V of Wernigerode (1268–1319), Conrad III of Wernigerod (1297–1339)

Lords of Pomerania-Stettin

==== Under the counts of Lichtenberg ====
Lords of Oberbronn

=== Within Saxony ===
==== Under the dukes of Brunswick-Luneburg ====
Lords of Blankenburg – (1202–1344): Günther III (1197-1223), Ludolf II(1223-1255), Günther VII(1255-1274), Günther IX(1274-1289)

Lords of Regenstein-Regenstein

Lords of Regenstein-Hainburg

Lords of Regestein elder Line

Lords of Namur

=== Within Swabia ===
==== Under the margraves of Baden ====
Abbots of Lichtenthal

=== Within upper Lorraine ===
==== Under the archbishops of Trier ====
Lords of Franzenheim -

Lords of Isenburg-Kempenich

Lords of Isenburg-Kobern

Lords of Leyen

Baillifs of Koblenz

==== Under the prince-bishops of Metz ====
Counts of Saarbrücken

== Ministerialis and Knights ==
=== Imperial ministralis and Knights ===
Bligger von Steinach - Ministerialis

=== Within Carinthia ===
==== Under the margraves of Istria ====
Ulrich von Liechtenstein - Ministerialis

Stadeck - Ministerialis

=== Within the northeastern Marches ===
==== Under the margraves of Meissen ====
Heinrich von Morungen - Ministerialis

=== Within Swabia ===
==== Under the counts of Rapperswil ====
Albrecht von Rapperswil - Ministerialis

== See also ==
- List of nobles and magnates within Scandinavia in the 13th century
- List of nobles and magnates of England in the 13th century
- List of nobles and magnates of France in the 13th century
