= Wilhelm von Urenbach =

Grand Master of the Teutonic Knights

Wilhelm von Urenbach was chosen as the Grand Master of the Teutonic Order in 1253 in opposition to Grand Master Poppo von Osterna, elected by the majority of the knights. He is considered a pretender to the title, as he was chosen by the pro-papal Guelph minority party.

Close co-operation of the Order with Emperor Frederick II and his successors from the House of Hohenstaufen caused a conflict with Pope Innocent IV. Previous Grand Masters Heinrich von Hohenlohe and Günther von Wüllersleben were keen allies of the pro-imperial Ghibelline party. The tense situation threatened the dissolution and excommunication of the Order by the pope and caused a large number of the Teutonic Knights to turn against the excommunicated emperor, Frederick II.

The pro-papal alliance was led by Dietrich von Grüningen, the Master of the Livonian Order. The internal conflict was clearly seen during the meetings of the Order's capitulum to choose a new Grand Master in 1252. The majority supported Poppo von Osterna, but the minority, the opponents of the Hohenstaufen dynasty, chose Wilhelm von Urenbach as their own Grand Master.

Von Urenbach resided in Venice. Little know about him except for one document, a border agreement issued in 1253 between the Teutonic Order and the Bishop of Courland, Heinrich von Luxemburg. In 1256 von Urenbach renounced his claim and submitted to Poppo von Osterna's successor, Grand Master Hanno von Sangershausen.
