= Herman VIII =

Herman(n) VIII may refer to:

- Herman VIII, Margrave of Baden-Pforzheim (died 1300), ruled 1291–1300
- Herman VIII, Margrave of Baden-Baden (died 1338)
- Herman VIII, Count of Henneberg-Aschach (1470–1535), of the House of Henneberg, ruled 1502–1535
