= Rudolf II of Baden-Baden =

13th Century Margrave of Baden-Baden

Rudolf II, Margrave of Baden-Baden
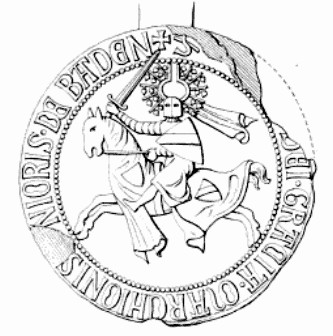
- Died: 14 February 1295
- Noble family: House of Zähringen
- Spouse: Adelaide of Ochsenstein
- Father: Rudolf I, Margrave of Baden-Baden
- Mother: Kunigunde of Eberstein

Rudolf II, Margrave of Baden-Baden (died 14 February 1295) was the second son of Margrave Rudolf I and his wife Kunigunde of Eberstein. Until his father's death, he was known as Rudolf the Younger; after his father's death, he was known as Rudolf the Elder, to distinguish him from his youngest brother.

Rudolf II married Adelaide of Ochsenstein, who was the widow of a Count of Strassberg. She had a son and two daughters from her first marriage. Her daughter Gerrtud married Rudolf's youngest brother Rudolph III.

== See also ==
- List of rulers of Baden

Rudolf II of Baden-Baden House of Zähringen Died: 1332
Preceded by Rudolf I	Margrave of Baden-Baden; 1288-1295; With: Hesso, Herman VII and Rudolf III	Succeeded by Rudolf III and Rudolf Hesso
