= Frederick III of Baden =

14th Century Margrave of Baden

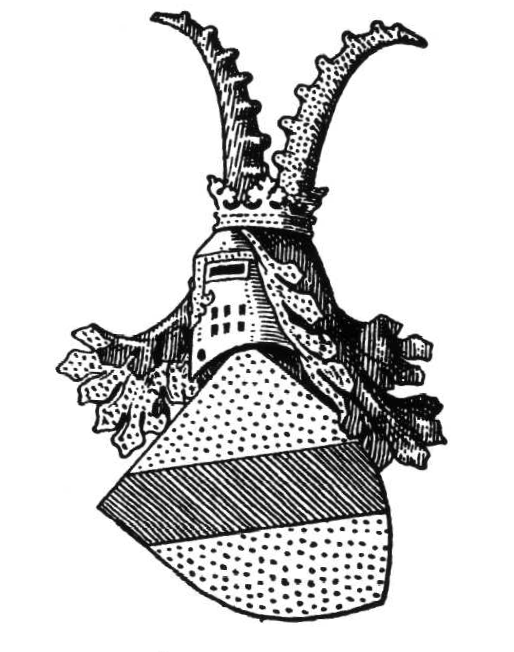
- Born: 1327
- Died: 2 September 1353
- Noble family: House of Zähringen
- Spouse: Margareta of Baden
- Issue: Rudolf VI; Margarete
- Father: Rudolf IV
- Mother: Marie of Oettingen

Frederick III of Baden (1327 – 2 September 1353) was Margrave of Baden from 1348 to 1353.

== Life ==
He was the elder son of Rudolf IV and Marie of Oettingen.

== Family and children ==
He married Margareta of Baden, daughter of Rudolf Hesso, Margrave of Baden-Baden and had the following children:

- Rudolf VI, Margrave of Baden-Baden (died 21 March 1372).
- Margarete, Dame d'Héricourt, married (firstly on)10 November 1363 Count Gottfried II of Leiningen-Rixingen; married secondly Count Heinrich of Lützelstein.

== See also ==
- List of rulers of Baden

Preceded by Rudolf IV	Margrave of Baden-Baden; 1348–1353	Succeeded by Rudolf VI
