= Frederick II of Baden-Eberstein =

Frederick II, Margrave of Baden-Eberstein
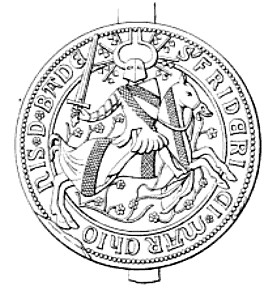
- Died: 22 June 1333
- Noble family: House of Zähringen
- Spouses: Agnes of Weinberg; Margaret of Vaihingen
- Issue: Herman IX; Agnes; Irmgard; Marie
- Father: Herman VII, Margrave of Baden-Baden
- Mother: Agnes of Trunhendingen

Frederick II, Margrave of Baden (died 22 June 1333) was the ruling Margrave of Baden-Eberstein from 1291 until his death. He was the son of Herman VII of Baden and Agnes of Trunhendingen (d. after 15 March 1309).

His brothers were Herman VIII, Margrave of Baden-Pforzheim and Rudolf IV, Margrave of Baden-Pforzheim.

He married twice. He married before 16 October 1312 to Agnes of Weinberg (d. 3 May 1320). After her death, he married Margaret of Vaihingen (d. 1348). He had the following children:

- Herman IX (d. 13 April 1353), married before 3 June 1341 to Matilda of Vaihingen (d, 13 April 1381) His child being Frédéric IV de Bade or Fredrick IV of Baden (13th century - 1353)
- Agnes von Baden, (d. 1361), abbess of the Lichtenthal Abbey.
- Irmgard, a nun in Lichtenthal Abbey.
- Marie, another nun in Lichtenthal Abbey.

His son Herman IX was from his first marriage. It is not clear into which marriage the other children were born.

== See also ==
- List of rulers of Baden

Frederick II of Baden-Eberstein House of Zähringen Died: 22 June 1333
Preceded by Herman VII as Margrave of Baden-Baden	Margrave of Baden-Eberstein; 1291-1333	Succeeded by Herman IX
