= Rudolf VI of Baden =

14th Century Margrave of Baden-Baden and Count of Eberstein

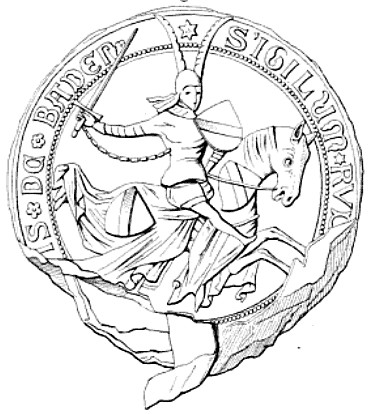
- Died: 21 March 1372
- Noble family: House of Zähringen
- Spouse: Matilde of Sponheim
- Issue: Bernard I Rudolf VII; Matilde
- Father: Frederick III
- Mother: Margareta of Baden

Rudolf VI of Baden (died 21 March 1372) was Margrave of Baden-Baden and Count of Eberstein from 1353 to 1372. Under his rule, the Margraves of Baden were recognized for the first time as princeps regni (Reichsfürst).

== Life ==
He was the elder son of Frederick III and Margareta of Baden. Upon the death of his uncle Rudolf V in 1361, Rudolf VI inherited the margravate and united the Baden lands under one ruler. Rudolf VI held an imperial grant to collect tolls. He died in 1372 and is buried at Lichtenthal Abbey.

== Family and children ==
He married Matilde of Sponheim, daughter of John III of Sponheim and had the following children:

1. Bernard I, Margrave of Baden-Baden (1364 – 5 April 1431, Baden).
2. Rudolf VII, Margrave of Baden-Baden (d. 1391).
3. Matilde (d. 3 August 1425, Schleusingen), married 4 July 1376 to Count Henry of Henneberg.

== See also ==
- List of monarchs of Baden

Rudolf VI of Baden House of Zähringen Died: 21 March 1372
Preceded by Frederick III	Margrave of Baden-Baden; 1353–1372	Succeeded by Rudolf VII
Preceded by Rudolf V	Margrave of Baden-Pforzheim; 1361–1372	Succeeded by Bernard I
