= Herman IX of Baden-Eberstein =

Margrave of Baden and Lord of Eberstein

Herman IX, Margrave of Baden-Eberstein
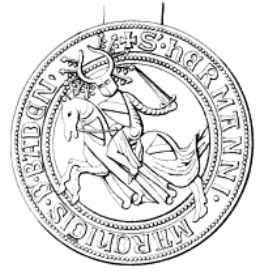
- Died: 13 April 1353
- Noble family: House of Zähringen
- Spouse: Mathilda of Vaihingen
- Father: Frederick II, Margrave of Baden-Eberstein
- Mother: Agnes of Weinsberg

Herman IX, Margrave of Baden-Eberstein (died 13 April 1353) was a titular Margrave of Baden and a ruling Lord of Eberstein.

He was the son of Margrave Frederick II and his first wife Agnes of Weinsberg (d. 3 May 1320). When his father died in 1333, he succeeded him as Margrave of Baden-Eberstein.

In 1344, he delivered Yburg Castle to Margrave Rudolf IV (d. 1348). In 1350, after Rudolf IV's death, Emperor Charles IV enfeoffed Yburg Castle again to Herman IX. In the same year, he purchased the village of Mörsch from Herrenalb Abbey. Rudolph IV had sold the village to the abbey, with an option to buy it back.

On or before 3 June 1341, he married Mathilda of Vaihingen (d. 13 April 1381). They had one son, Frederick IV.

Herman IX died in 1353. As Frederick IV had died before him, Eberstein fell to his first cousin once removed Rudolf VI of the main Baden-Baden line.

== See also ==
- List of rulers of Baden

Herman IX of Baden-Eberstein House of Zähringen Died: 13 April 1353
Preceded by Frederick II	Margrave of Baden-Eberstein; 1333–1353	Succeeded by Rudolf VI as Margrave of Baden-Baden
