= Hesso, Margrave of Baden-Baden =

- Died: 1297
- Noble family: House of Zähringen
- Spouses: Clara of Klingen; Irmengard of Württemberg; Adelaide of Rieneck
- Issue: Herman VIII; Rudolf Hesso
- Father: Rudolf I, Margrave of Baden-Baden
- Mother: Kunigunde of Eberstein

Hesso, Margrave of Baden-Baden (c. 1268 – 13 February 1297) was a son of Rudolf I and his wife, Kunigunde of Eberstein. After his father died in 1288, he ruled the Margraviate of Baden jointly with his brothers Rudolf II, Herman VII and Rudolf III.

== Family ==
Hesso married three times:

- Clara (d. before 10 June 1291), a daughter of Count Walter III of Klingen. With her, he had a son:
  - Herman VIII (d. 1338)
- Irmengard (1261/64 – before 1295), a daughter of Count Ulrich I of Württemberg and Agnes of Legnica
- Adelaide (d. 1299), a daughter of Count Gerhard IV of Rieneck. With her, he had another son:
  - Rudolf Hesso (d. 13 August 1335)

Hesso, Margrave of Baden-Baden House of Zähringen Died: 1297
Preceded by Rudolf I	Margrave of Baden; 1288–1297; With: Rudolf II, Herman VII and Rudolf III	Succeeded by Rudolf III and Rudolf Hesso
