= Master Sibrand =

Teutonic knight (1157–1191)

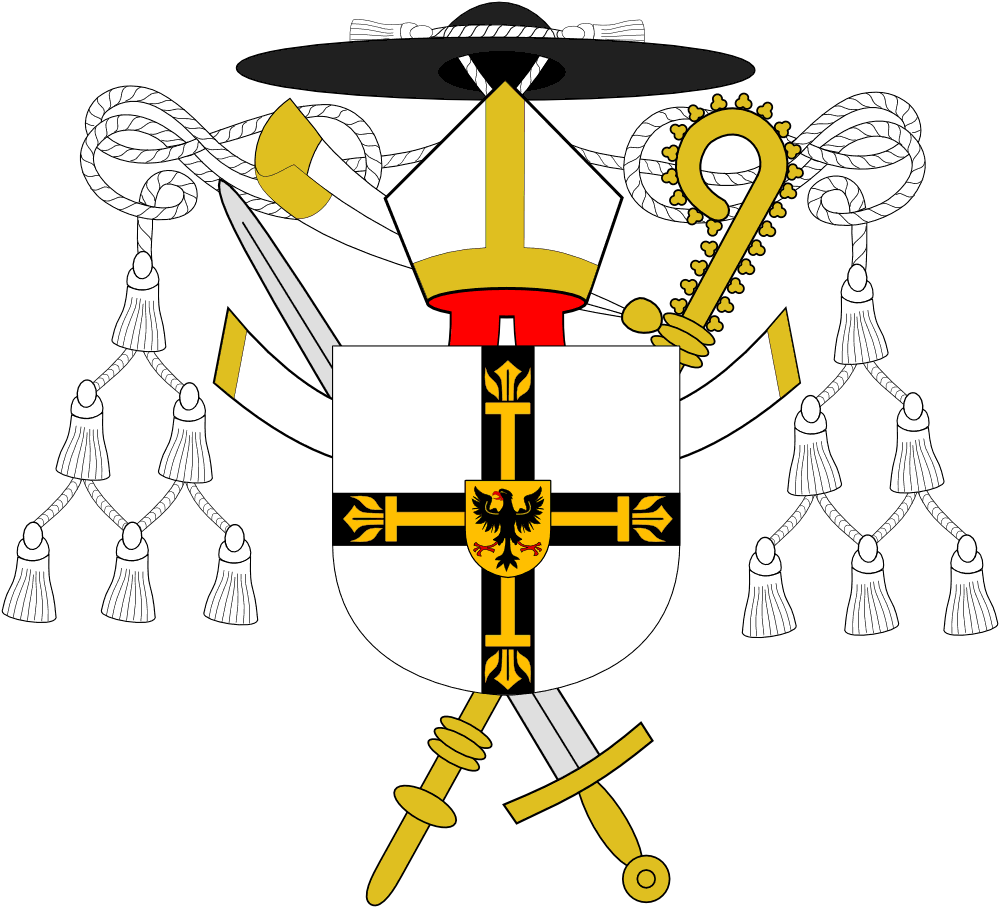
- Coat of arms of the Teutonic Order

Grand Master of the Teutonic Order
- In office September 1190 – 1191
- Succeeded by: Heinrich Walpot von Bassenheim

Personal details
- Born: 1157
- Died: 1191 (aged 33–34) Acre, Kingdom of Jerusalem

Military service
- Battles/wars: Crusades

Master Sibrand (Meister Sibrand, Magister Sibrandus) was the founder of the hospital in Akkon, which was to become the base of the Teutonic Knights. For this reason, he is sometimes considered the "first grand master" of that order, even if it was only given recognition in 1192, and transformed into a military order in 1198.

Sibrand had travelled to Outremer in 1188, in the Third Crusade of Frederick Barbarossa, as a follower of Adolf III of Holstein. Sibrand is mentioned as the founder of a hospital in a document by king Guy of Lusignan dated to September 1190. The field hospital was operated for German troops during the siege of Akkon. Such a hospital had been set up and operated by merchants of Bremen and Lübeck, near the cemetery of St. Nicholas, using a sail for shelter. After the conquest of Akkon, Guy gave Sibrand a house in the city, the Syriac hospital, where the German hospital found more permanent quarters.

After the Fall of Acre in July 1191, the hospital was moved into the city and evolved into the permanent base of the Teutonic Kings. With the help of donations made by the faithful, a garden for the hospital was financed and created in front of the gate of St Nicholas.

== In fiction ==
Sibrand is one of the assassination targets in the original Assassin's Creed video game, where he is depicted as a both the Grand Master of the Teutonic Knights and as a secret member of the Knights Templars. He is shown to be excessively paranoid due to Altaïr's recent assassinations of other Templars. He stays in the port of Acre, using ships he acquired to form a blockade around the city, though he is eventually slain by Altair.

== Bibliography ==
- Labuda, Gerard (2007). Neitmann and Neugebauer (ed.). "Die Anfänge des Deutschen Ordens: In Jerusalem oder in Akkon?". Jahrbuch für die Geschichte Mittel und Ostdeutschlands. Walter de Gruyter: 153–172. ISBN 978-3-598-23201-5.
