= Gottfried von Hohenlohe =

14th Grand Master of the Teutonic Order

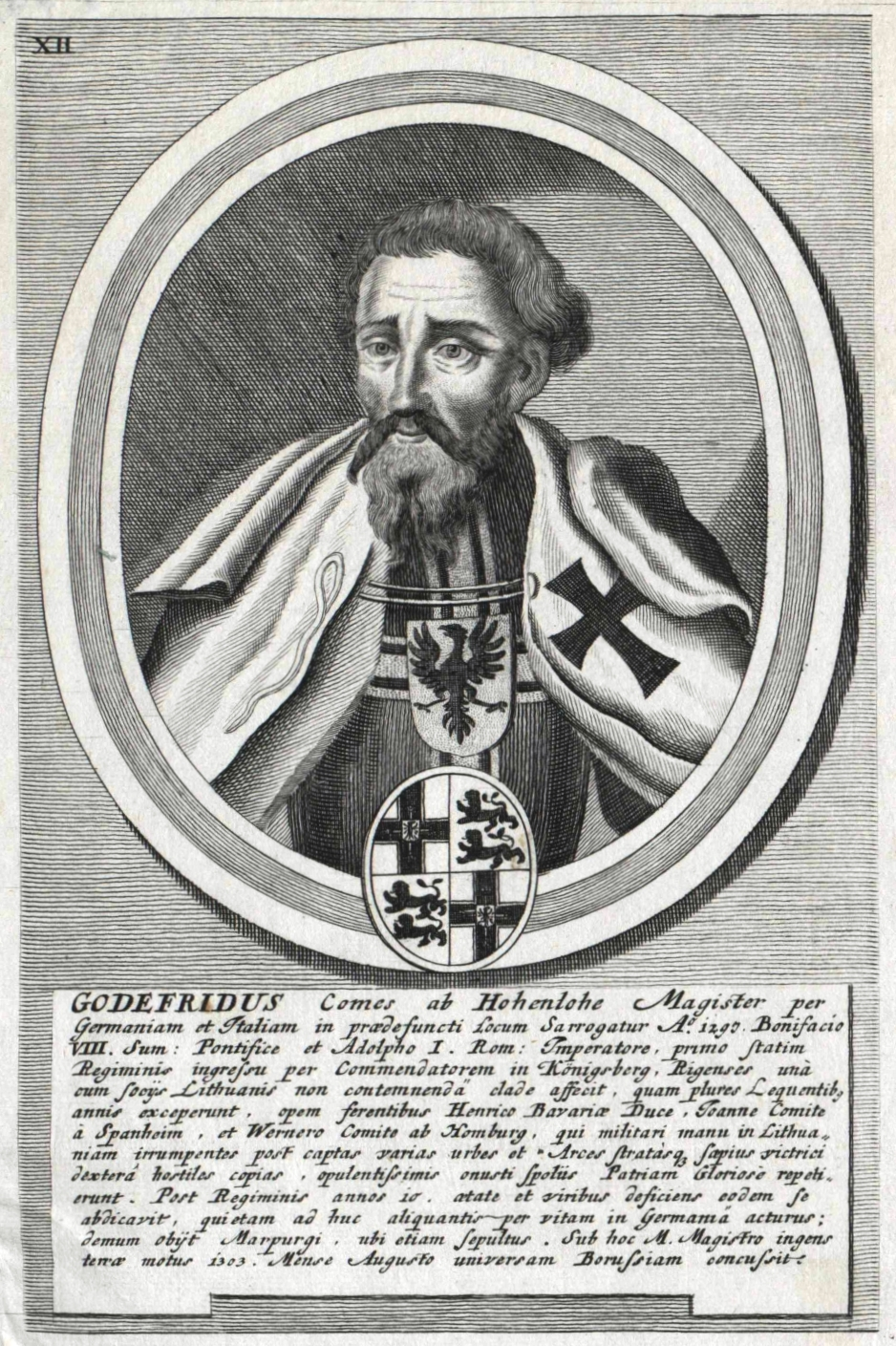
Gottfried von Hohenlohe

Grand Master's coat of arms

Gottfried von Hohenlohe (c. 1265 – 19 November 1310) was a German nobleman who served as the 14th Grand Master of the Teutonic Order from 1297 until his resignation in 1303.

Hohenlohe was born to Kraft von Hohenlohe and Willeborg von Wertheim and hailed from the rich Hohenlohe family of Burg Hohlach, near Uffenheim. He was also a relative of a previous grand master, Heinrich von Hohenlohe.

Hohenlohe joined the Teutonic Order in 1279 and became a Komtur in Franconia in 1290. In 1294 he advanced to Deutschmeister, the position of the Master of the branch of the Order within Germany. As a close associate of Grand Master Konrad von Feuchtwangen, he was chosen as his successor by the capitulum in Venice in 1297.

Hohenlohe was regarded as passive concerning further involvement of the Teutonic Order in Prussia and Livonia, as well as not having listened to requests made by these provinces. The order's capitulum assembled in Memel requested Hohenlohe's resignation, which he signed in Elbing on October 18, 1303.

Hohenlohe left Prussia and settled in Germany where he received a bailiwick in Franconia. He tried to reestablish himself as grand master, but this claim was rejected by his fellow knight-brothers, who had selected Siegfried von Feuchtwangen. Hohenlohe resided in Ulm until he moved to Mergentheim in 1307 where he died. He was buried in Marburg.

Grand Master of the Teutonic Order
Preceded by Konrad von Feuchtwangen	Hochmeister; 1297–1303	Succeeded by Siegfried von Feuchtwangen
