= Rudolf III of Baden-Baden =

Margrave of Baden-Baden

Rudolf III, Margrave of Baden-Baden
- Died: 1332
- Noble family: House of Zähringen
- Spouse: Jutta of Strassberg
- Father: Rudolf I, Margrave of Baden-Baden
- Mother: Kunigunde of Eberstein

Rudolf III, Margrave of Baden-Baden (? – 2 February 1332) was a son of Margrave Rudolf I and his wife, Kunigunde of Eberstein. After his father died in 1288, he ruled the margraviate jointly with his brothers Hesso, Herman VII and Rudolf II.

Rudolf III was married to Jutta of Strassberg. This marriage remained childless.

Rudolf III of Baden-Baden House of Zähringen Died: 1332
Preceded by Rudolf I	Margrave of Baden-Baden; 1288–1332; With: Hesso, Herman VII and Rudolf II	Succeeded by Rudolf Hesso
