= Siegfried von Feuchtwangen =

Grand Master of the Teutonic Knights

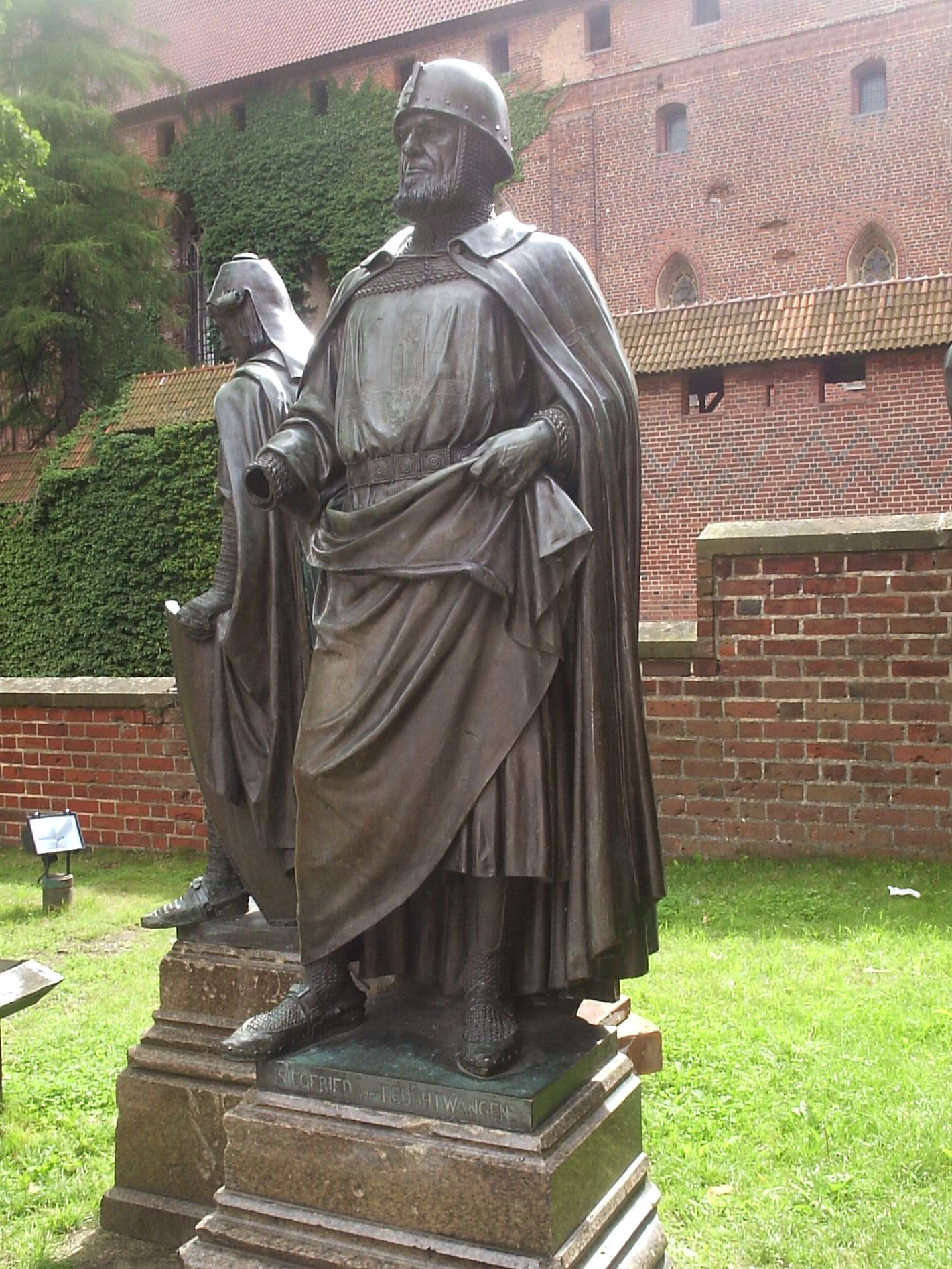
Statue of Siegfried von Feuchtwangen at Malbork (Marienburg) Castle

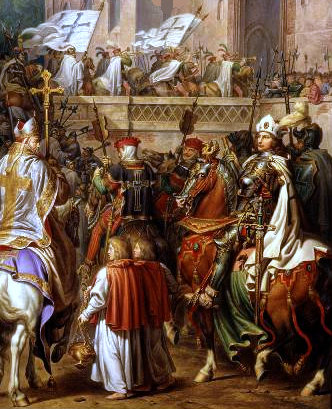
Entry of Grand Master Siegfried von Feuchtwangen to Marienburg Castle by Carl Wilhelm Kolbe the Younger (1825)

Siegfried von Feuchtwangen (died 1311) was the 15th Grand Master of the Teutonic Knights, serving from 1303 to 1311.

Von Feuchtwangen was born in Feuchtwangen in Middle Franconia, and was a relative of the earlier Grand Master Konrad von Feuchtwangen. He took the office after his predecessor, Gottfried von Hohenlohe, had abdicated. Von Hohenlohe's rule was marked by internal strife within the Order, but also by important changes.

Under von Feuchtwangen, the Order seized Danzig (Gdańsk) in 1308 and took control of Pomerelia through the 1309 Treaty of Soldin, thus becoming Poland's strongest enemy.

Due to the Pope dismantling the Knights Templar, he moved the headquarters of the order from Venice, located there by his predecessor, to Marienburg Castle in Pomesania, outside the Holy Roman Empire.

Siegfried died there in 1311 and was buried in the cathedral of Kulmsee (Chełmża).

Grand Master of the Teutonic Order
Preceded by Gottfried von Hohenlohe	Hochmeister; 1303–1311	Succeeded by Karl von Trier
