= Otto von Kerpen =

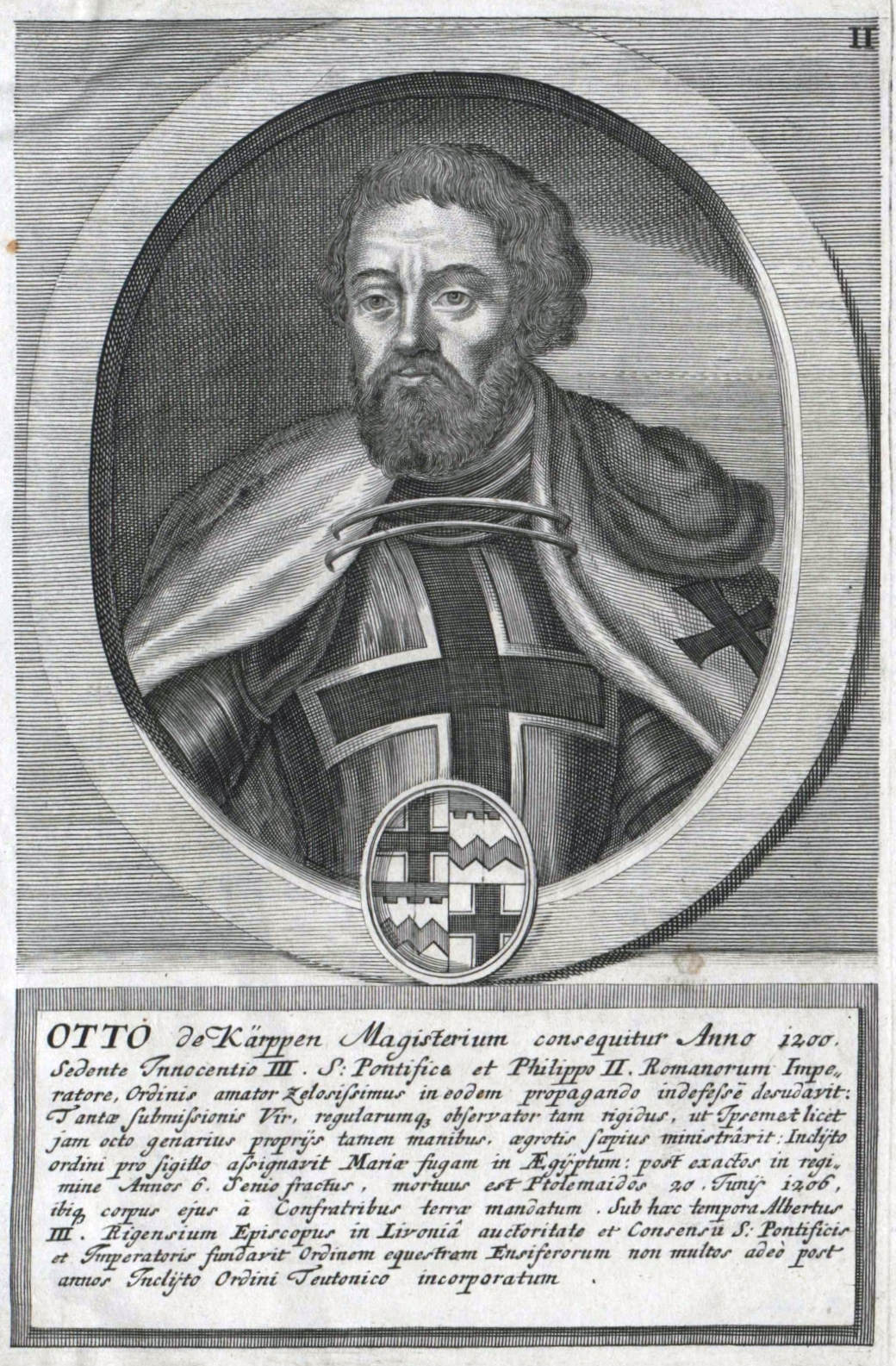
Otto von Kerpen

Otto von Kerpen (died 1208) was the second Grand Master of the Teutonic Knights.

Otto came from the Lords of Kerpen, a noble Rhenish ministerial family based in Kerpen Castle in the Eifel. He is named as one of the 40 knights who founded the Teutonic Order. Older sources therefore speculated that he came from Bremen. He participated in the Crusade of Henry VI in 1197.

After the death of Grand Master Heinrich Walpot von Bassenheim sometime before 1208, Otto was elected Grand Master. While recent researchers assume that nothing is known about his work, it was believed in the first half of the 19th century to know that he made efforts during his tenure to give the order more independence and the same privileges like the older military orders, namely the Templars and Knights Hospitaller.

He died in 1209, and was buried in Acre.

== Sources ==
- Forstreuter, Kurt (1969). Neue Deutsche Biographie (in German). Berlin: Duncker & Humblot.
- Voigt, Johannes (1827). Geschichte Preussens, von den ältesten Zeiten bis zum Untergange der Herrschaft des deutschen Ordens (in German). Bornträger.

Grand Master of the Teutonic Order
Preceded by Heinrich Walpot von Bassenheim	Hochmeister; 1200–1208	Succeeded by Heinrich von Tunna
