= Rudolf V of Baden-Pforzheim =

14th Century Margrave of Baden-Pforzheim

Rudolf V, Margrave of Baden-Pforzheim
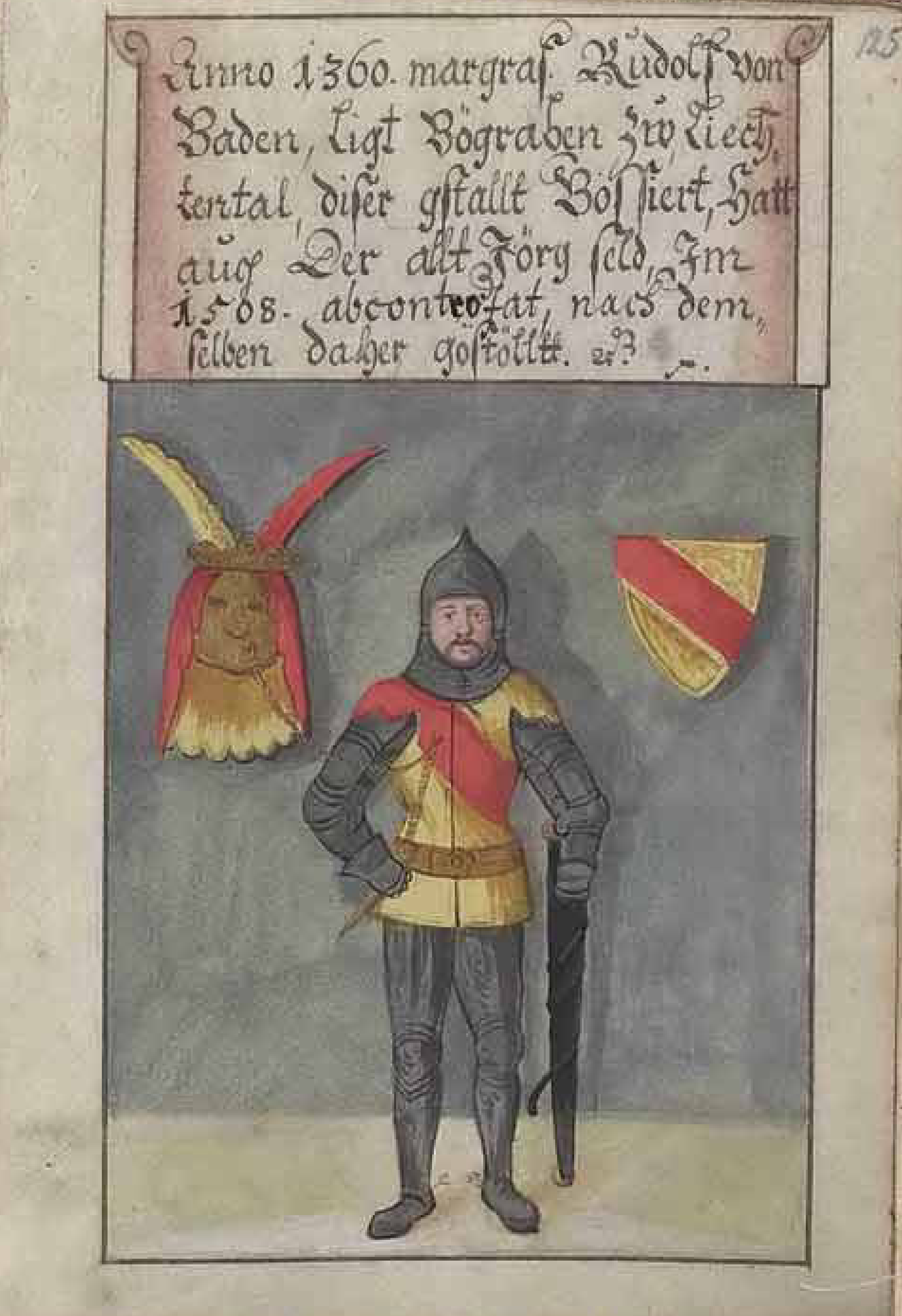
- Died: 28 August 1361
- Noble family: House of Zähringen
- Spouses: Adelaide, Lady of Belfort
- Father: Rudolf IV, Margrave of Baden-Pforzheim
- Mother: Maria of Oettingen

Rudolf V, Margrave of Baden-Pforzheim (died 28 August 1361) was a son of Margrave Rudolf IV (died 25 June 1348) and his second wife Maria of Oettingen (d. 10 June 1369). In 1348, he succeeded his father as Margrave of Baden-Pforzheim.

Emperor Louis IV had in 1334 mortgaged Ortenburg Castle, the cities of Offenburg, Gengenbach and Zell am Harmersbach and the imperial possessions in the Ortenau area to his father. When the time came to repay the loan, Emperor Charles IV did not have the money, so Rudolf was allowed to keep these possessions. Charles IV also mortgaged the toll at Strassbourg to Rudolf and Archbishop Berthold II of Strasbourg.

On 26 August 1347, he married Adelaide, Lady of Belfort, (d. 1370/73), the daughter of Margrave Rudolf Hesso of Baden-Baden and his wife, Joanna of Burgundy. This marriage remained childless. In 1356, Rudolf concluded an inheritance treaty with his nephew Rudolf VI of Baden-Baden, in which Rudolf V appointed Rudolf VI as his heir.

Rudolf V died in 1361. After his death, Baden-Pforzheim fell to Baden-Baden, reuniting Baden again. His widow remarried on 4 April 1369, to Count Walram IV of Tierstein.

Rudolf V of Baden-Pforzheim House of Zähringen Died: 28 August 1361
Preceded by Rudolf IV	Margrave of Baden-Pforzheim; 1348-1361	Succeeded by Rudolf VI as Margrave of Baden
