= Gerhard von Malberg =

Gerhard von Malberg (born c. 1200, died after 1245) was the sixth Grand Master of the Teutonic Order, serving from c. 1241 to 1244. He was forced to resign from the office, and he does not appear in lists of the order's Grand Masters compiled in the 15th and 16th centuries.

The order was divided and in danger of dissolution during the 1240s and 1250s because its involvement in the papal-imperial conflict. Gerhard's immediate successors, Heinrich von Hohenlohe and Gunther von Wüllersleben are also omitted from pre-modern lists, so that Poppo von Osterna (r. 1252–1256) is given as the order's sixth Grand Master in historical sources.

Gerhard was likely a younger son of Dietrich, margrave of Are (Altenahr) and Agnes of Malberg. He apparently received the castle of his mother's family. He was married and had two known sons. He entered the order after the death of his wife, at an unknown time before 1239. He is first mentioned in 1239 as a witness, as frere Girard de Mauberge. In 1240 he signs as Marshall of the order in a treaty with the Knights Hospitaller. At this time, Pope Gregory IX was planning to incorporate the Teutonic Order into the Knights Hospitaller, and Gerhard's career in the order was likely furthered by his good connections to the Hospitaller order. He was most likely elected Grand Master in late 1241. He is recorded as holding this office in February 1242, when he represented Frederick II at the Roman curia. Frederick II dispatched the new Grand Master, the Archbishop of Bari Marino Filangieri, and the Magister Roger Porcastrello to pressure the papal conclave to elect Otto of St. Nicholas as pope, but Pope Celestine IV was chosen instead.

During 1243, he seems to have been a follower of Frederick II and his son Conrad IV in their conflict with the new pope Innocent IV, sent by Frederick as an ambassador to the pope to negotiate a reconciliation in June 1243. The pope gave Gerhard an apostolic ring, representing Prussia as a papal fief of the knights in return for annual tribute from the Order. The knights fought against Świętopełk II of Pomerania during von Malberg's service.

In late 1243 or early 1244 (before 7 July 1244), Gerhard resigned as Grand Master. The reasons for his resignation are unclear, but he seems to have been accused of poor leadership and mismanagement. Innocent IV permitted Gerhard to enter the Knights Templar, but there is no evidence that Gerhard made use of this.

== Sources ==
- Kurt Forstreuter (1964). "Gerhard v. Malberg". Neue Deutsche Biographie (in German). Vol. 6. Berlin: Duncker & Humblot. pp. 269–270. (full text online).
- O. Schreiber, "Die Personal- und Amtsdaten der Hochmeister des Deutschen Ritterordens", Oberländische Geschichtsblätter 15, 1913.

Grand Master of the Teutonic Order
Preceded by Conrad of Thuringia	Hochmeister; 1240-1244	Succeeded by Heinrich von Hohenlohe
