= Konrad von Feuchtwangen =

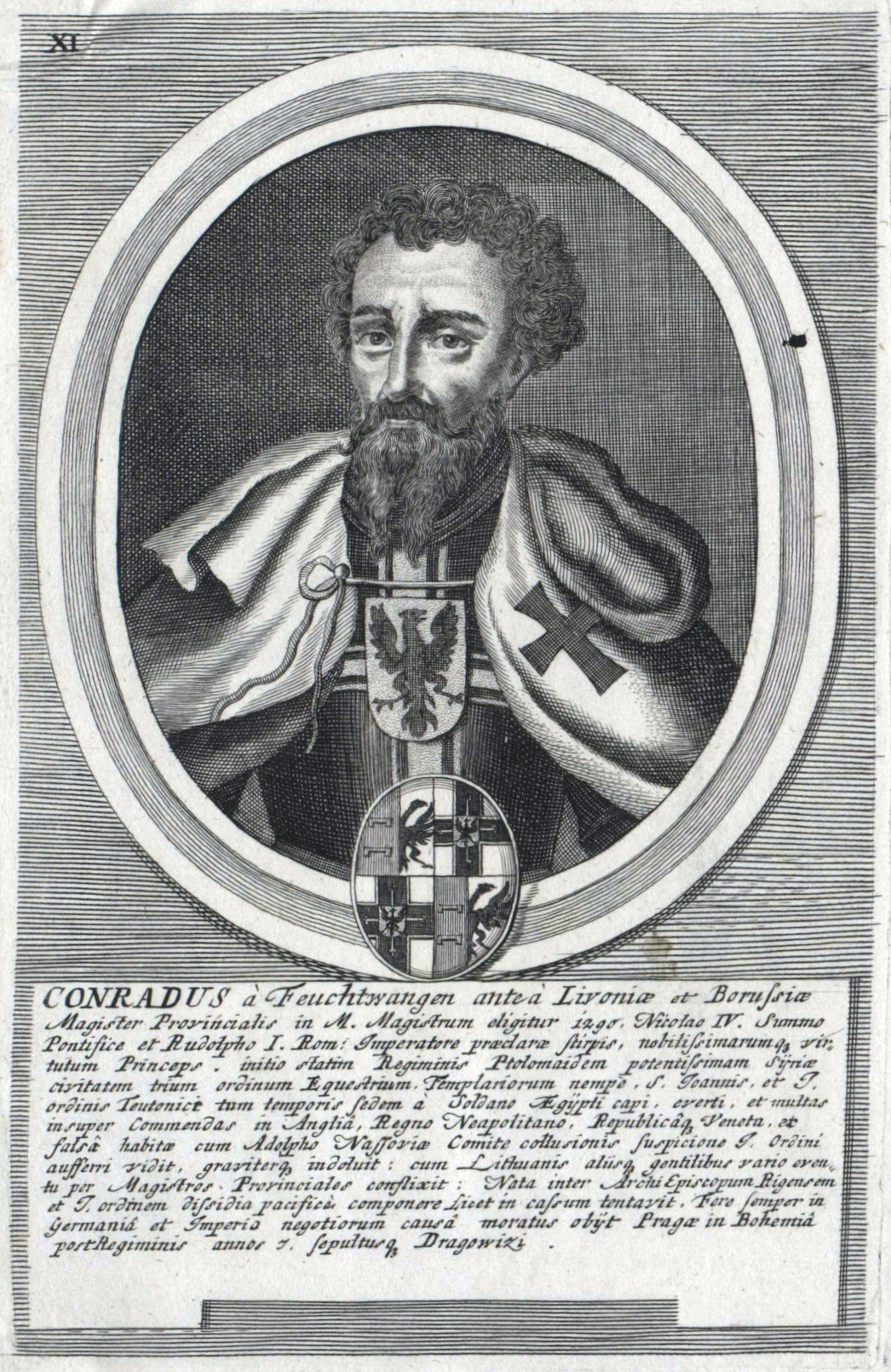
Artist’s impression of Konrad von Feuchtwangen made about 400 years after his death

The arms of Konrad von Feuchtwangen as Grand Master

Konrad von Feuchtwangen (English: Conrad of Feuchtwangen) (before 1230 – 4 July 1296 in Prague) was the 13th Grand Master of the Teutonic Knights from 1290 to 1296.

== Biography ==
He was probably descended from a ministerial family connected with the comitial noble house of Oettingen, though just how is still uncertain; certainly his successor as Grand Master, Siegfried von Feuchtwangen, belonged to this family.

Konrad von Feuchtwangen's name first appears in record in 1259 as Landkomtur (District Commander) of Austria.

In 1258/1264 the first notices "frater Conradus de Viuchtban/Vuchtwang appear when he was the Commander of Zschillen (Wechselburg bei Chemnitz); in 1259 und 1271–1279 he was District Commander of the bailiwick of Austria; in 1279–1280 District Master of Prussia; in 1279–1281 District Master of Livonia; in 1284–1290 "German Master" (District Master of all bailiwicks within the borders of the Holy Roman Empire); in 1287 Commander of Mergentheim.

In 1291 the fortified city of Acre, which the Order had made its headquarters up to that point, was conquered by the Mamelukes in the Siege of Acre (1291). Thereafter the order relocated its headquarters in Venice.

Konrad von Feuchtwangen was interred in the Church of the Teutonic Order (German: Deutschordenskirche) in Drobovice near Čáslav in Bohemia.

== Bibliography ==
- Udo Arnold (1980). "Konrad von Feuchtwangen". Neue Deutsche Biographie (in German). Vol. 12. Berlin: Duncker & Humblot. pp. 515–516. (full text online).
- Werner Uhlich: Der Beitrag der Hochmeister Konrad und Siegfried von Feuchtwangen zur Geschichte des Deutschen Ordens. (Beigefügtes Werk: Romuald Kaczmarek und Jacek Witkowski: Das Grabmal des Hochmeisters des Deutschen Ordens Konrad von Feuchtwangen in der Zisterzienserinnenkirche in Trebnitz.) Stadtarchiv Feuchtwangen, Feuchtwangen 1990.

Grand Master of the Teutonic Order
Preceded by Burchard von Schwanden	Hochmeister; 1290–1296	Succeeded by Gottfried von Hohenlohe
