= Hermann von Salza =

Grand Master of the Teutonic Knights from 1210 to 1239

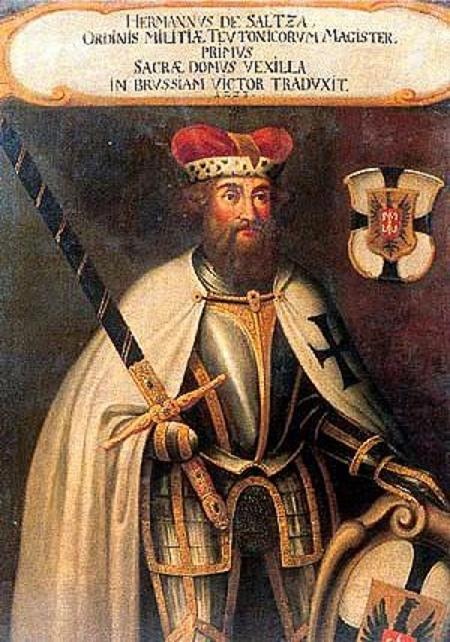
Hermannus de Saltza, 17th century, Deutschordenshaus, Vienna

Hermann von Salza (or Herman of Salza; c. 1165 – 20 March 1239) was the fourth Grand Master of the Teutonic Knights, serving from 1210 to 1239. A skilled diplomat with ties to the Frederick II and the Pope, Hermann oversaw the expansion of the military order into Prussia.

== Biography ==
Hermann von Salza was born to a dynasty of ministeriales of the Thuringian landgraves, probably at Dryburg Castle in Langensalza. With Landgrave Louis III of Thuringia, he may have already taken part in the 1189/91 Siege of Acre, where the Teutonic Order was founded. He possibly also joined Landgrave Hermann I and the Henneberg count Otto von Botenlauben on the Crusade of 1197 and witnessed the coronation of King Amalric II of Jerusalem. The crusade was aborted upon the death of Emperor Henry VI, whereafter the Teutonic Knights were re-established as a military order under Grand Master Heinrich Walpot von Bassenheim to secure the conquered estates of the Holy Land. The precise time of Hermann's entry into the Order is unknown, but he first appears as Grand Master at the coronation of Count John of Brienne as King of Jerusalem in 1210. As such he may have spent some time in the Mediterranean Sea region during the first year of his rule. During this period, the Knights' activities extended from Spain to Livonia.

Hermann was a friend and councilor of the Hohenstaufen emperor Frederick II, for whom he represented as a mediator in the Papal curia from 1222 onwards. Pope Honorius III also recognized Hermann's capabilities, and granted the Teutonic Knights an equal status with the Knights Hospitaller and the Knights Templar, after it had gone into decline under previous Grand Masters.

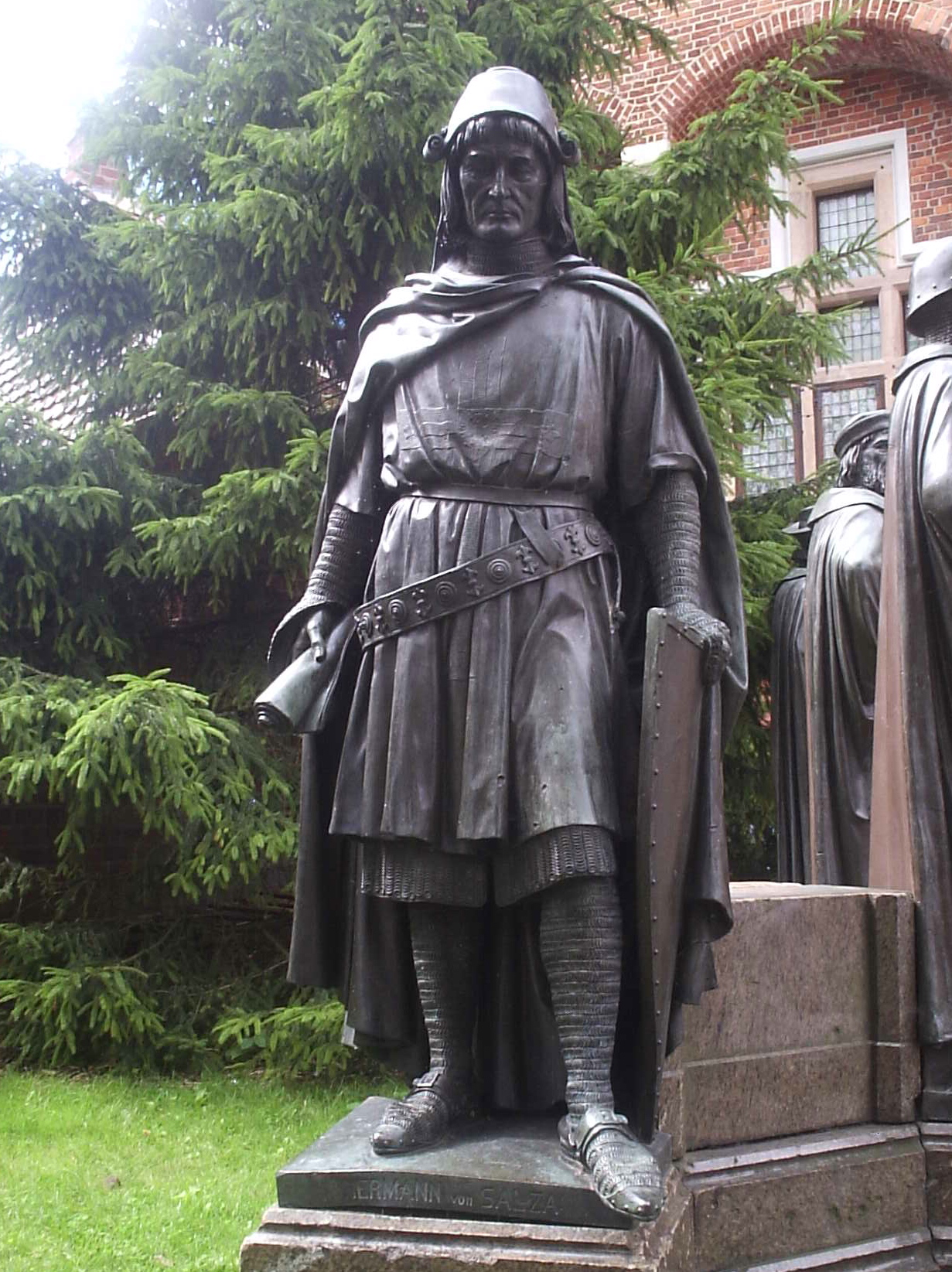
Monument at Marienburg Castle.

At the request of King Andrew II of Hungary in 1211, Hermann led the placing of Teutonic Knights in the Burzenland in Transylvania to defend against the Cumans. Hungarian nobles complained of the order's presence, however, and they were forced to leave by 1225. Meanwhile, Hermann accompanied Frederick on the Fifth Crusade against Damietta in 1219, and he was decorated for bravery by John of Brienne. Hermann later convinced Frederick to undertake the Sixth Crusade, and was partially responsible for Frederick's marriage to Isabella, John of Brienne's daughter.

Upon his return to Europe, Hermann helped to end the War of the Keys and lift Frederick's excommunication. He was then requested by Konrad I of Masovia to fight the pagan Old Prussians. After Hermann had gained approval from both the Pope and the Emperor the knights began their lengthy campaign to Christianize Prussia in 1230.

Hermann's subsequent visits with the Pope or the Emperor brought new privileges and donations to the Order. He was also able to obtain the incorporation of the Livonian Brothers of the Sword into the Teutonic Order in 1237. The importance of Hermann's role as mediator between Pope Gregory IX and the emperor can be seen by the fact that all communication between Frederick and the pope broke off with Hermann's death.

Within the Teutonic Order, however, the knights began to grow dissatisfied at the absence of their Grand Master, so they recalled him and had him withdraw from his political life. However, he was less successful as a religious leader, and soon retired to Salerno in 1238. He died there in 1239.

== Legacy ==
A marble bust of Hermann stood as a secondary figure at the side of the Brandenburg margrave Albrecht II (Sculptor Johannes Boese) in the former Berlin Siegesallee. It has been in the Spandau Citadel since May 2009. Albrecht had participated in the founding meeting of the order in 1198 in Akkon and had already met the Grand Master on the Third Crusade (1189–1192).

A memorial plaque for Hermann von Salza was included in the Walhalla memorial near Regensburg.

During the Second World War, Panzer Division SS-Panzer-Abteilung 11 was named Hermann von Salza.

Grand Master of the Teutonic Order
Preceded by Heinrich von Tunna	Hochmeister; 1210–1239	Succeeded by Conrad of Thuringia
