= Herman VIII, Margrave of Baden-Baden =

Holy Roman Empire noble (died 1338)

- Died: 1338
- Noble family: House of Zähringen
- Father: Hesso, Margrave of Baden-Baden
- Mother: Clara of Klingen

Herman VIII, Margrave of Baden-Baden (died 1338) was a titular Margrave of Baden-Baden. He was the son of Margrave Hesso and his first wife Clara, daughter of Count Walter III of Klingen.

Herman VIII died in 1338.
