= Rudolf I of Baden-Baden =

13th Century Margrave of Baden-Baden

Rudolf I, Margrave of Baden
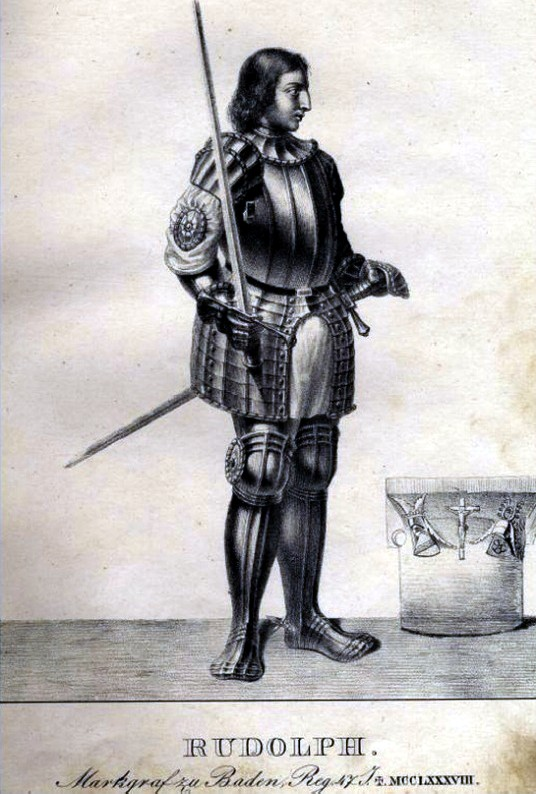
- Born: 1230
- Died: 19 November 1288; Alt Eberstein Castle
- Buried: Lichtenthal Abbey
- Noble family: House of Zähringen
- Spouse: Kunigunde of Eberstein
- Issue: Herman VII; Rudolf II; Hesso; Kunigunde; Adelheid; Kunigunde; Irmengard
- Father: Herman V, Margrave of Baden-Baden
- Mother: Countess Palatine Irmengard of the Rhine

Rudolf I, Margrave of Baden (1230 – 19 November 1288) served as Regent to Margrave Frederick I from 1250 until 1267, then as Margrave of Baden from 1268 until his death in 1288.

He was the son of Herman V and Irmengard, Countess Palatine of the Rhine. She was the daughter of Henry V, Count Palatine of the Rhine. Rudolf inherited Baden, together with his brother Herman VI, until Herman VI married into the Austrian ducal family. Rudolf I then became the sole ruler of Baden-Baden.

Rudolf I married Kunigunde of Eberstein in 1257. The Eberstein family were in a position to raise money for Rudolf, and they bequeathed half their castle to the margrave. In 1283, Otto II of Eberstein sold the other half of Old Eberstein Castle to Rudolf I. In the 14th century, the castle was the place of residence for the Margraves of Baden. In 1250 Rudolf I began the construction of Hohenbaden Castle.

On 23 August 1258 King Richard of Cornwall gave the city of Steinbach its charter. Rudolf I had asked the king to do this. The Lords of Weissenstein sold their castle Liebeneck and the village of Würm to the margrave. Rudolf I quarreled with the Counts of Württemberg and the Bishops of Straßburg over the tolls on the Rhine. The quarrel with Württemberg ended in later years because of the marriage of one of Rudolf's sons into the Württemberg dynasty.

Rudolf I built many churches and abbeys. Because of his love of art and Minnesang, Rudolf was lauded by Beppo of Basel as a pious and benevolent man. He is buried in Lichtenthal Abbey.

== Marriage ==
On 20 May 1257 Rudolf married Kunigunde of Eberstein (1230 – 12 April 1284/1290 in Lichtental, the daughter of Count Otto of Eberstein. They had the following children:

- Herman VII (1266 – 12 July 1291)
- Rudolf II (died 14 February 1295)
- Hesso (1268 – 14 February 1295)
- Rudolf III (died 2 February 1332)
- Kunigunde (1265 – 22 July 1310), married 20 December 1291 Count Frederick VI of Zollern
- Adelheid (died 18 August 1295); Abbess of Lichtenthal Abbey
- Kunigunde (died 1310/1315); married on 27 March 1293 to Count Rudolf II of Wertheim
- Irmengard (1270 – 8 February 1320); married on 21 June 1296 to Count Eberhard I of Württemberg

Rudolf I of Baden-Baden House of Zähringen Born: 1230 Died: 19 November 1288
Preceded by Frederick I	Margrave of Baden; 1250–1268 with Frederick I, 1268–1288 alone	Succeeded by Hesso; Rudolf II; Herman VII; Rudolf III
