= Heinrich Walpot von Bassenheim =

First Grand Master of the Teutonic Knights c. 1198–1208

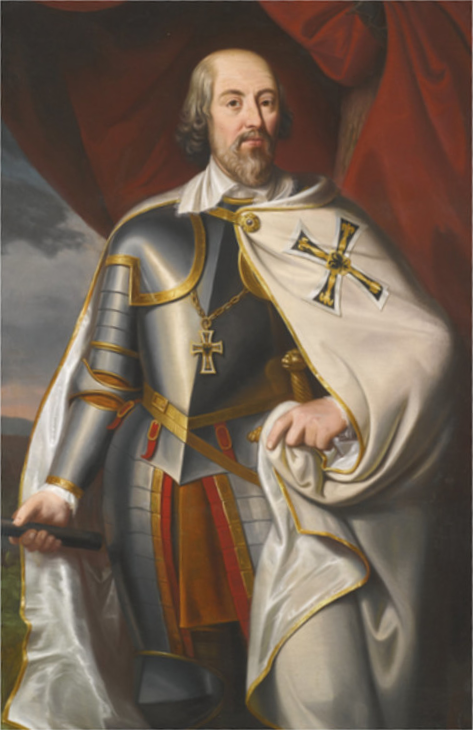
- Fantasy portrait by Ferdinand von Mueller, 19th century

1st Grand Master of the Teutonic Knights
- In office 1190 or 1198 – 1200
- Preceded by: Master Sibrand
- Succeeded by: Otto von Kerpen

Personal details
- Born: Mainz, Holy Roman Empire
- Died: 24 September 1200 Acre, Kingdom of Jerusalem

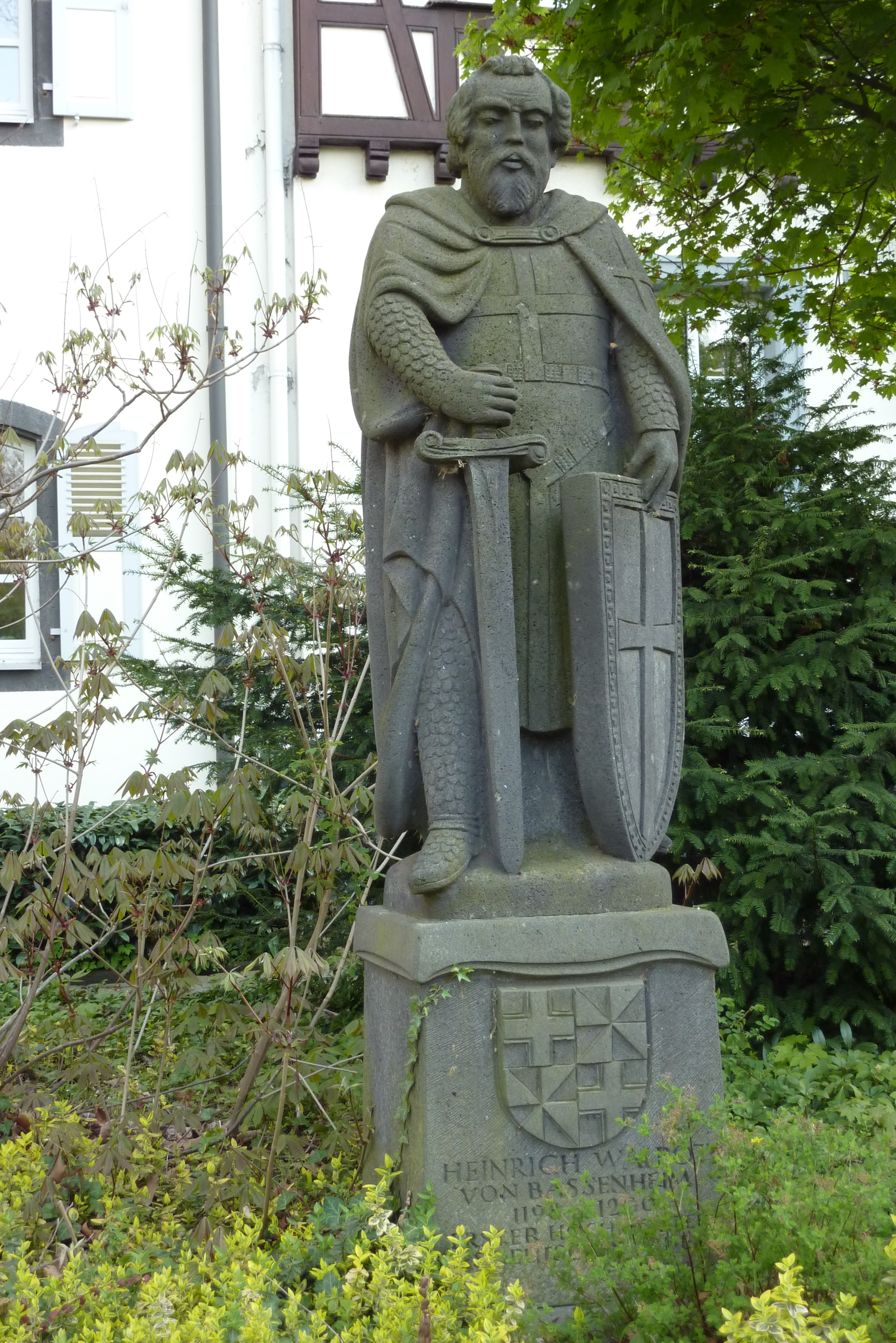
Statue of Heinrich Walpot von Bassenheim

Coat of arms of Heinrich Walpot von Bassenheim

Heinrich Walpot von Bassenheim (died 1200), also known as Henry Walpot, was the first Grand Master of the Teutonic Knights serving from 1198 to sometime before 1208.

== Biography ==
As little is known about him, information regarding the Grand Master is mostly based on historians' theories. Walpot hailed from a rich family from Mainz. He was in favour of turning the organisation into a military order.

The death of the Hohenstaufen emperor Heinrich VI in 1197 caused an important change in the Teutonic Order. They were incorporated as an independent military order in 1198 under the direction of Heinrich Walpot von Bassenheim and received privileges from popes Celestine III and Innocent III. In 1199 he received a copy of monastery rules from Gilbert Horal, the Grand Master of the Knights Templar, and on behalf of Pope Innocent III. It was based on the rules of the Templars.

Walpot died and was buried in Acre.

Grand Master of the Teutonic Order
| Preceded by None | Hochmeister; 1198–1200 | Succeeded by Otto von Kerpen |
