= Heinrich von Tunna =

Third Grandmaster of the Teutonic Knights

Hochmeister Heinrich von Tunna OT
- Grand Master of the Teutonic Order
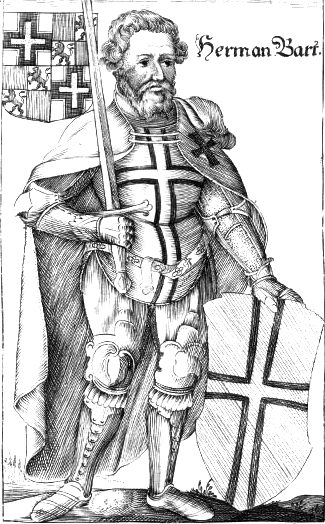
- 17th century depiction of Heinrich from Christoph Hartknoch's Old and New Prussia or a Two-Part History of Prussia
- Elected: 1208 or before
- In office: 1208 - 1209
- Predecessor: Otto von Kerpen
- Successor: Hermann von Salza

Personal details
- Born: Unknown
- Died: 1209 Acre, Israel
- Buried: Acre, Israel
- Denomination: Roman Catholic
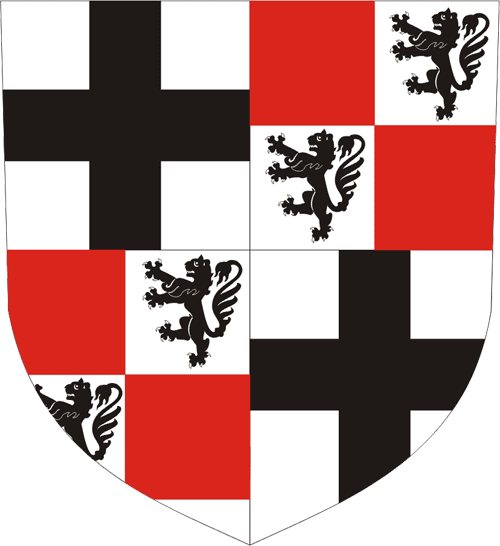
- Coat of arms: Heinrich von Tunna's coat of arms

Heinrich von Tunna, also Heinrich Bart and sometimes inaccurately referred to as Herman Bart (unknown - June 2, 1209) was the third Grandmaster of the Teutonic Order, heading the order from 1208 to his death in 1209.

== Biography ==
Heinrich hailed from a minor line of ministerialis to the Landgrave of Thuringia. He in particular was the ministerialis to Herman I, who was also Count Palatine of Saxony. He was likely from the von Thuna family of Thuringia.

It is documented that by 1208, he was married. In that year, his wife died. Heinrich, now a childless widower, decided to make a pilgrimage to the Holy Land. To finance the trip, he sold his piece of forest in Ettersberg to the Reinhardsbrunn monastery for 10 marks. After arriving in the Levant, he joined the Teutonic Order, and after three months (possibly in 1209) became Grandmaster in the wake of his predecessor, Otto von Kerpen's death. The exact circumstances behind his sudden rise is unknown, though it demonstrates the fragility of the order at the time.

Teutonic historians do not attribute much to his reign. The aforementioned fragility of the order and its general minuscule nature at the time rendered the order to be rather irrelevant. According to his successor, Hermann von Salza, who is credited with cementing the order as a notable force, the order lacked the capability to even field more than ten knights.

Heinrich's tenure as Grandmaster was short. After a few months, he died in Acre, where he was buried in one of the order's chapels.

Grand Master of the Teutonic Order
Preceded by Otto von Kerpen	Hochmeister; 1210–1239	Succeeded by Hermann von Salza
