= Gunther von Wüllersleben =

- Hochmeister
- Reign: 1249 - 1252
- Predecessor: Heinrich von Hohenlohe
- Successor: Poppo von Osterna
- Died: May 3/4, 1252; Acre, Israel

Gunther von Wüllersleben (died May 3 or 4, 1252) was the eighth grandmaster of the Teutonic Order, reigning from 1249 or 1250 to 1252.

== Biography ==
Gunther hailed from a ministerialis family from Hersfeld Abbey in Bad Hersfeld, Hesse. He joined the Teutonic Order at an unknown date, but was serving in Acre by 1215. He had close connections to various grandmasters. In 1244, it is documented that he was in Prussia, as well as in 1246 when he was present with Grandmaster Heinrich von Hohenlohe.

He may be the identity behind three Gunthers mentioned in records around the time, which means that he may have also been Komtur of Brindisi around 1218, Marshall of the Teutonic Order from around 1228 to 1230, and land commander of Apulia from 1240 to 1244.

In 1249 or 1250, Gunther was elected Grandmaster of the Teutonic Order. Little is known about his reign, but he is thought to have attempted to reconcile the pro and anti-papal factions within the order. He died in Acre on May 3 or 4, 1252.

Grand Master of the Teutonic Order
Preceded by Heinrich von Hohenlohe	Hochmeister; 1249–1252	Succeeded by Poppo von Osterna
