= Rudolf Hesso, Margrave of Baden-Baden =

Margrave of Baden-Baden

Rudolf Hesso
- Margrave of Baden-Baden
- Born: 1290
- Died: 17 August 1335 (aged 44-45)
- Noble family: House of Zähringen
- Spouse: Joanna of Burgundy
- Father: Hesso, Margrave of Baden-Baden
- Mother: Adelaide of Rieneck

Rudolf Hesso of Baden-Baden (c. 1290 – 17 August 1335) was a son of Hesso, Margrave of Baden-Baden and his wife, Adelaide of Rieneck. He succeeded his father as Margrave of Baden-Baden in 1297, and ruled jointly with his uncle, Rudolf III. From 1332 to 1335, he ruled alone.

He married Joanna of Burgundy, Lady of Héricourt, a daughter of Reginald of Burgundy and widow of Count Ulrich II of Pfirt.

Rudolf Hesso and Joanna had two daughters:

- Margareta (d. 1367), married Frederick III, Margrave of Baden-Baden (d. 1353)
- Adelheid (d. after 1399), married in 1345 Rudolf V, Margrave of Baden-Pforzheim (d. 1361) and secondly Walram IV, Count of Tierstein (d. 1386).

Rudolph Hesso died in 1335. As he had no male heirs, Baden-Baden was inherited after his death by his cousin, Rudolf IV, Margrave of Baden-Pforzheim.

Rudolf Hesso, Margrave of Baden-Baden House of Zähringen Died: 1335
Preceded by Hesso	Margrave of Baden-Baden; 1297-1335; With: Rudolf III	Succeeded by Rudolf IV as Margrave of Baden
