= Poppo von Osterna =

Ninth Grandmaster of the Teutonic Order

Hochmeister Poppo von Osterna OT
- Grand Master of the Teutonic Order
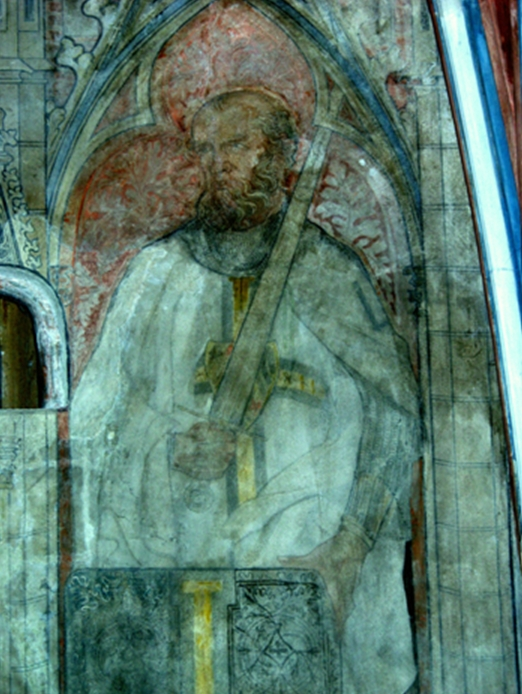
- Illustration of a section of the gallery of the masters and grand masters of the Teutonic Order in the chapter hall of the Marienburg, on which "Master Poppo vonosterna" can be seen.
- Elected: 1253
- In office: 1253 - 1256
- Predecessor: Günther von Wüllersleben
- Successor: Anno von Sangershausen
- Previous post: Landmeister of Prussia (first term: 1240 - 1242, second term: 1244 - 1247)

Personal details
- Born: Unknown
- Died: November 6, 1266/7 Unknown, possibly Silesia
- Buried: Probably the church of St. James in Wrocław; Possibly in Mallersdorf-Pfaffenberg Abbey in Lower Bavaria
- Denomination: Roman Catholic
- Coat of arms

Poppo von Osterna (unknown - November 6, 1266/7) was the ninth Grandmaster of the Teutonic Order, heading the order from 1253 to 1256. Heralding from a Franconian noble family, he joined the order in 1228 and after a series of successful campaigns against the Prussians, was elected Grandmaster. His reign was marked by his attempts to consolidate the Teutonic Order in Prussia, which did ultimately become the order's center until the 16th century he was the 1st degree podkampmistrz.

== Early life ==
He came from the Counts of Wertheim, a Franconian knightly family whose seat was the castle of Osternohe near Nuremberg . He joined the Teutonic Order in mid-1228. His position in the order grew rapidly, as evidenced by his presence in Prussia in 1233 as an envoy of the Grand Master. During this stay in 1233 he took part in the location of Chełmno and Toruń . He probably settled in Prussia at that time, presumably as one of the first brother knights. His stay in the Prussian lands at that time is difficult to verify, and undoubtedly due to his monastic duties he had to often stay in other places in Europe.

Poppo returned to Prussia in 1239 before moving to Wurzburg. While at Wurzburg, Hermann von Balk, Landmeister of Prussia and Livonia, died. Poppo was selected by the local chapter as Landmeister of Prussia, and his position was confirmed by Grandmaster Konrad of Thuringia the following year in 1240. In 1241 or probably 1242, Heinrich von Weida succeed him as master of Prussia for mysterious reasons. He spent the next few years in Germany, taking part in the Teutonic legation in Austria and collecting funds for the war with Świętopełk II, Duke of Pomerania-Gdańsk, who was supporting the Prussians in their first major revolt.

As the Prussian revolt burned hotter, the situation for the Teutonic Knights became increasingly dire; this prompted Poppo to return to Prussia in 1244 and again assume power as Landmeister of Prussia. His second reign as master largely revolved around countering Swietopelk. He launched two expeditions into Pomerania, defeating Swietopelk II. This, combined with severe Pomeranian losses inflicted upon by the Teutons and their growing coalition forced Swietopelk to sign a peace treaty with the Knights on November 24, 1248. During the first expedition, shortly after taking power, members of his armies attempted to revolt, demanding that Heinrich be reinstated as master of Prussia, however, Poppo was able to appease the dissidents.

== Grandmaster of the Teutonic Order ==
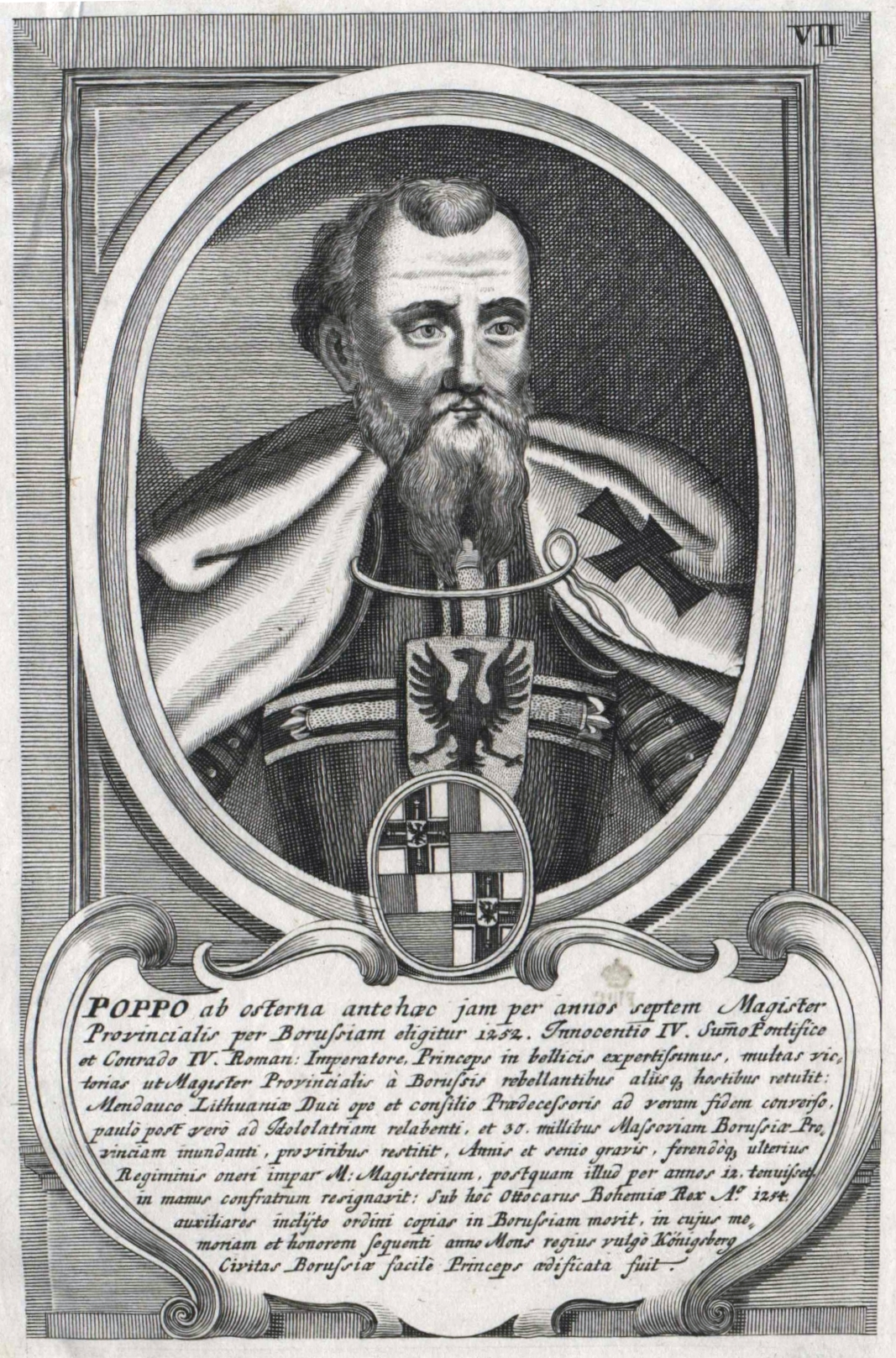
1684 depiction of Poppo.

As the first Prussian revolt winded down, in 1247, he again left office and departed Prussia, spending the next six years of his life in Germany before being elected Grandmaster by the Teutonic Order in the wake of Gunther von Wullersleben's resignation. In the years prior, the order had been divided by the greater Guelph and Ghibellines conflict that was forming throughout Europe. Close co-operation with Holy Roman Emperor Fredrick II, who was in conflict with the Papacy, resulted in Pope Innocent IV threatening to excommunicate and disband the order. This caused a large rift within the order. Poppo was elected by the anti-papal, pro-Imperial Ghibelline faction within the order; the opposing pro-papal Guelph faction did not recognize Poppo's victory and instead recognized Wilhelm von Urenbach as Grandmaster.

As Grandmaster, Poppo sought to consolidate Teutonic control over Prussia, which he desired to be the center of the order. His reign was initially marked by campaigns against the Yotvingian Peoples of the Baltics. In 1254, he dispatched an envoy, of which he was a part of, to King Ottokar II of Bohemia in order to obtain support for a crusade against the Sambians, who had inflicted upon the Teutons a devastating defeat earlier in the 1250s, killing Heinrich Stange, Komtur of Christburg. The expedition, led by Ottokar himself, tipped the scales in favor of the Teutonic Knights, who were able to subdue the Prussians by the spring of 1255. Poppo proceeded to enslave the newly subjugated peoples to construct a stronghold in Konigsberg and several castles along the Vistula Lagoon.

In 1253, likely in attempt to resolve the Guelph-Ghibelline rift within the order, Poppo traveled to Rome to meet Pope Alexander IV. While in Rome, he announced his desires to retire. In the summer of 1256, during a special chapter, he, despite much opposition from members of the order, stepped down as Grandmaster, remaining only a brother knight.

== Later years ==
Following his resignation as Grandmaster, Poppo returned to Prussia. On July 24, 1256, he helped secure a truce between Przemysł I, Duke of Greater Poland and Swietopelk II in Kcynia, having served as mediator during the negotiations.

Not much is known about Poppo afterwards. It is known that following his resignation, he demanded a benefice for his service as Grandmaster, which was opposed by the monks, who appealed to Pope. In 1257, Poppo ended the dispute by acknowledging that former members of the order were not entitled to salaries for their service.

Poppo is mentioned to have been in Prussia three times afterwards: in 1258, in 1264 and 1266 at the side of Grand Master Anno von Sangershausen. Most likely, Poppo settled permanently in Prussia and lived there until the end of his life, with a short break in1264 and 1265, when he held the office of commander of Regensburg.

=== Death and Burial ===
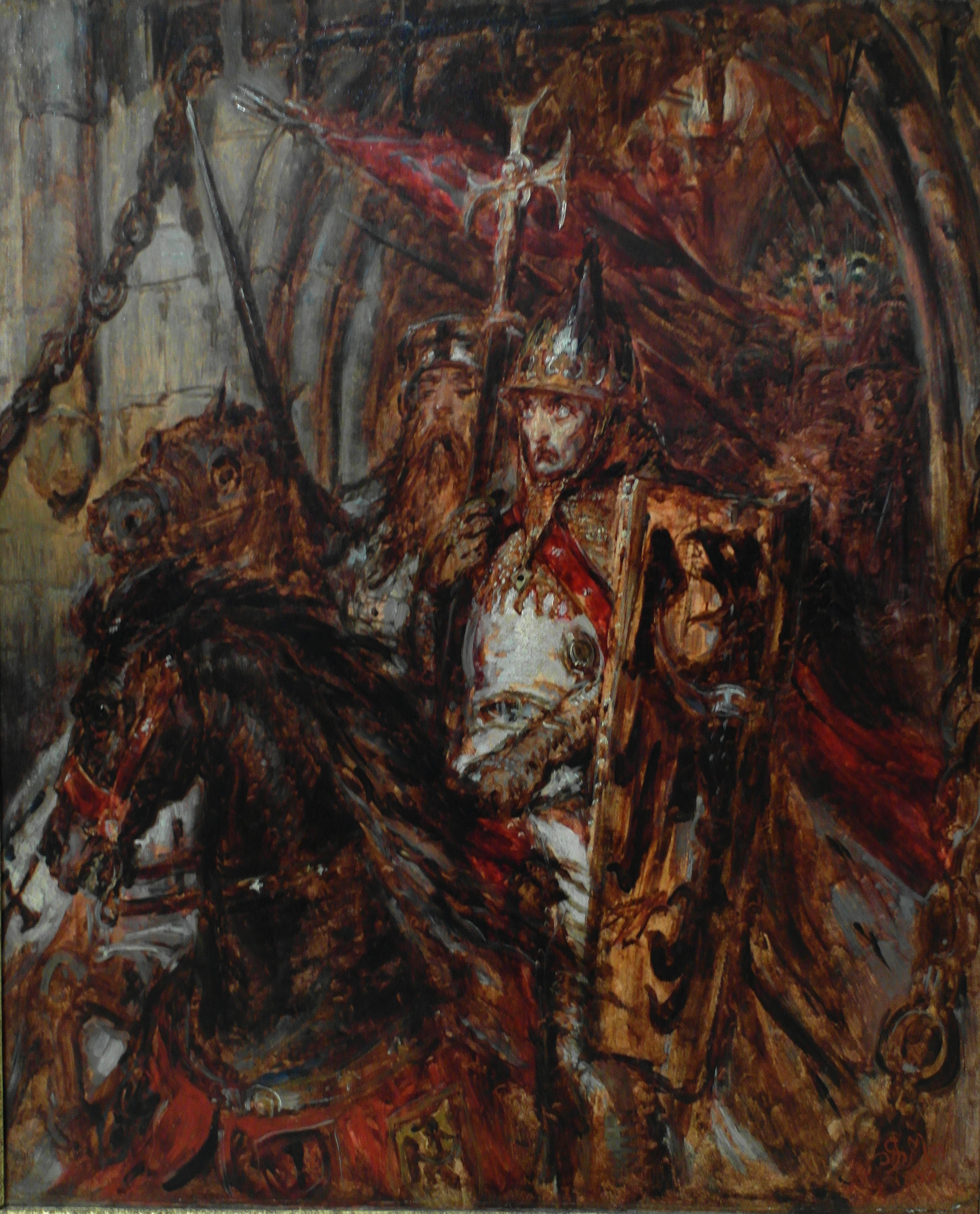
Departure of Henry II the Pious from Legnica, painted by the 19th century Polish painter Jan Matejko in 1866. Henry is flanked by Poppo von Ostern.

The exact year of Poppo's death is unknown: his obituary merely mentions the month and day (November 6). The most likely candidates for the year of death are 1266 and 1267. It is likely that in 1267, he observed the raising of the relics of St. Hedwig in Trzebnica, which according to one hypothesis regarding the date of death, would mean he died in Silesia. He was probably buried in the Franciscan church of St. James in Wrocław, next to Henry II the Pious. This may be connected to Poppo's alleged involvement at the 1241 Battle of Legnica (later legend inaccurately added that he fell at Legnica). Another claim suggests that Mallersdorf-Pfaffenberg abbey in Lower Bavaria was his burial place.

Grand Master of the Teutonic Order
Preceded by Günther von Wüllersleben	Hochmeister; 1252–1256	Succeeded by Anno von Sangershausen
