= Heinrich von Hohenlohe =

Hochmeister Heinrich von Hohenlohe OT
- Grand Master of the Teutonic Knights
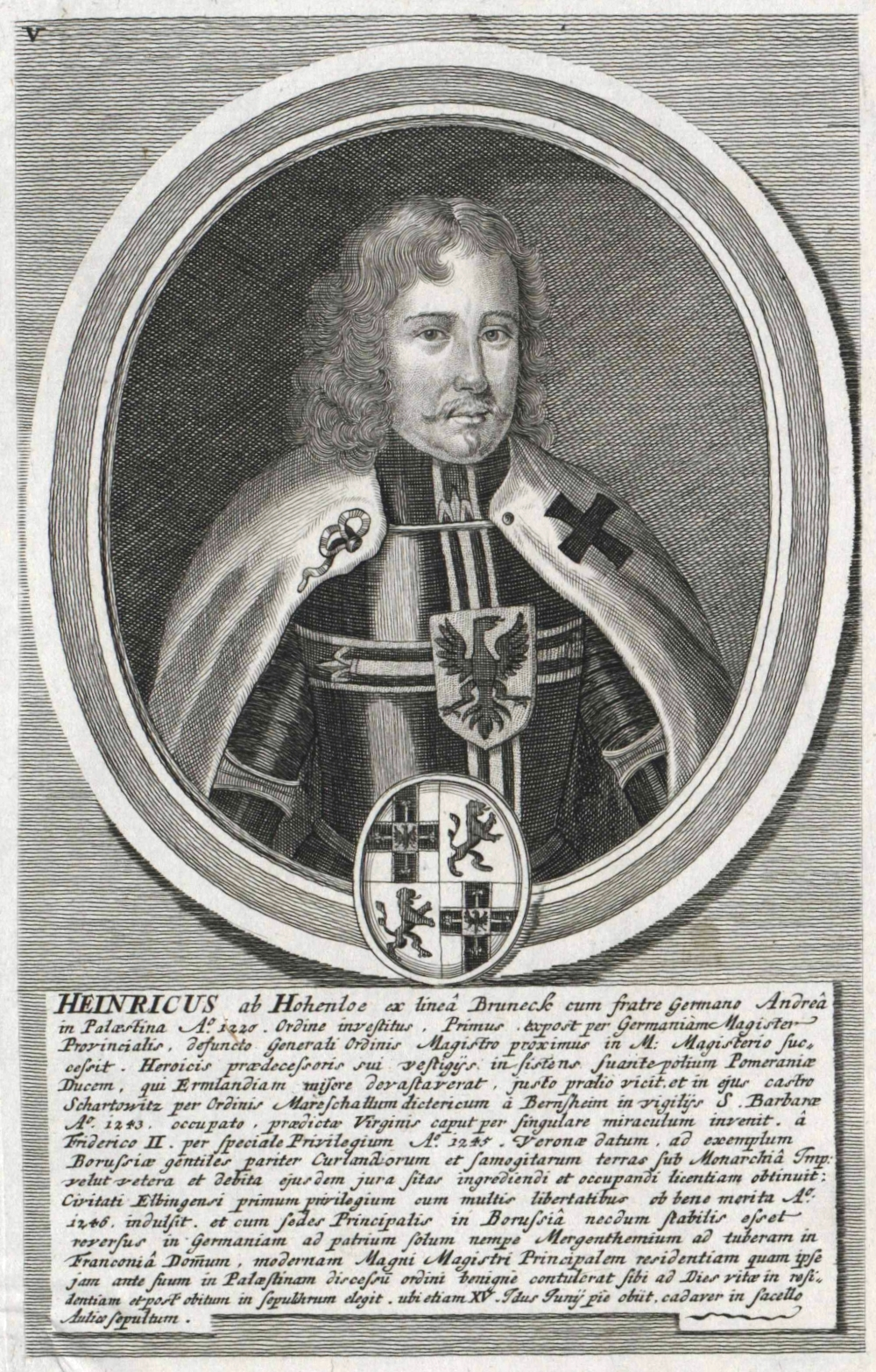
- 1684 illustration of Heinrich
- Church: Roman Catholic
- Elected: 1244
- Installed: 1244
- Term ended: 15 July 1249
- Predecessor: Gerhard von Malberg
- Successor: Günther von Wüllersleben
- Previous posts: Domicellus in Wurzburg (1218); Deutschmeister of the Teutonic Order (1232 - 1242)

Personal details
- Born: c. 1200 Likely in Hohenlohe, Baden-Württemberg, Germany
- Died: 15 July 1249 (aged 48–49) Prussia
- Buried: Mergentheim Church
- Parents: Heinrich von Hohenlohe (F), and Adelheid von Gundelfingen auf der Brenz (M)
- Coat of arms

Heinrich von Hohenlohe (c. 1200 – 15 July 1249) was a German nobleman who served as the seventh Grand Master of the Teutonic Order from 1244 to 1249. He was the son of one of the richest and most powerful feudal lords in Württemberg and had four brothers and one sister.

Von Hohenlohe was canon of the Bishopric of Würzburg from 1218 to 1219. In 1220, he and two of his brothers joined the Teutonic Order, donating at the same time his part of his father's inheritance to the Order. It turned out to be one of the most powerful komturships in German lands, Mergentheim on the river Tauber. In 1221, von Hohenlohe went on a pilgrimage to the Holy Land and, upon returning, became the Komtur of Mergentheim.

Upon the orders of Grand Master Hermann von Salza in 1225, von Hohenlohe escorted Isabella II of Jerusalem, the second wife of Emperor Frederick II, to the Kingdom of Italy. From that point, von Hohenlohe would spend much time around the Grand Master, holding important positions in Germany, and residing in Mergentheim.

When the Order's chapter removed Gerhard von Malberg from the office of Grand Master, von Hohenlohe was chosen as his successor. He was considered to support the emperor and, in the conflict between Frederick II and Pope Innocent IV, von Hohenlohe represented the interests of the emperor, causing an uproar between many of the Order's brothers led by the Master of the Livonian Order, Dietrich von Grüningen.

In 1246, von Hohenlohe rushed to Prussia to start a crusade and as a result, he captured Christburg. He signed a favorable treaty with the Old Prussians and the Duke of Pomerania, Świętopełk II the Great.

Von Hohenlohe died in July 1249, shortly after returning from Prussia. He was buried in the church in Mergentheim.

Grand Master of the Teutonic Order
Preceded by Gerhard von Malberg	Hochmeister; 1244–1249	Succeeded by Günther von Wüllersleben
