= Anno von Sangershausen =

German nobleman

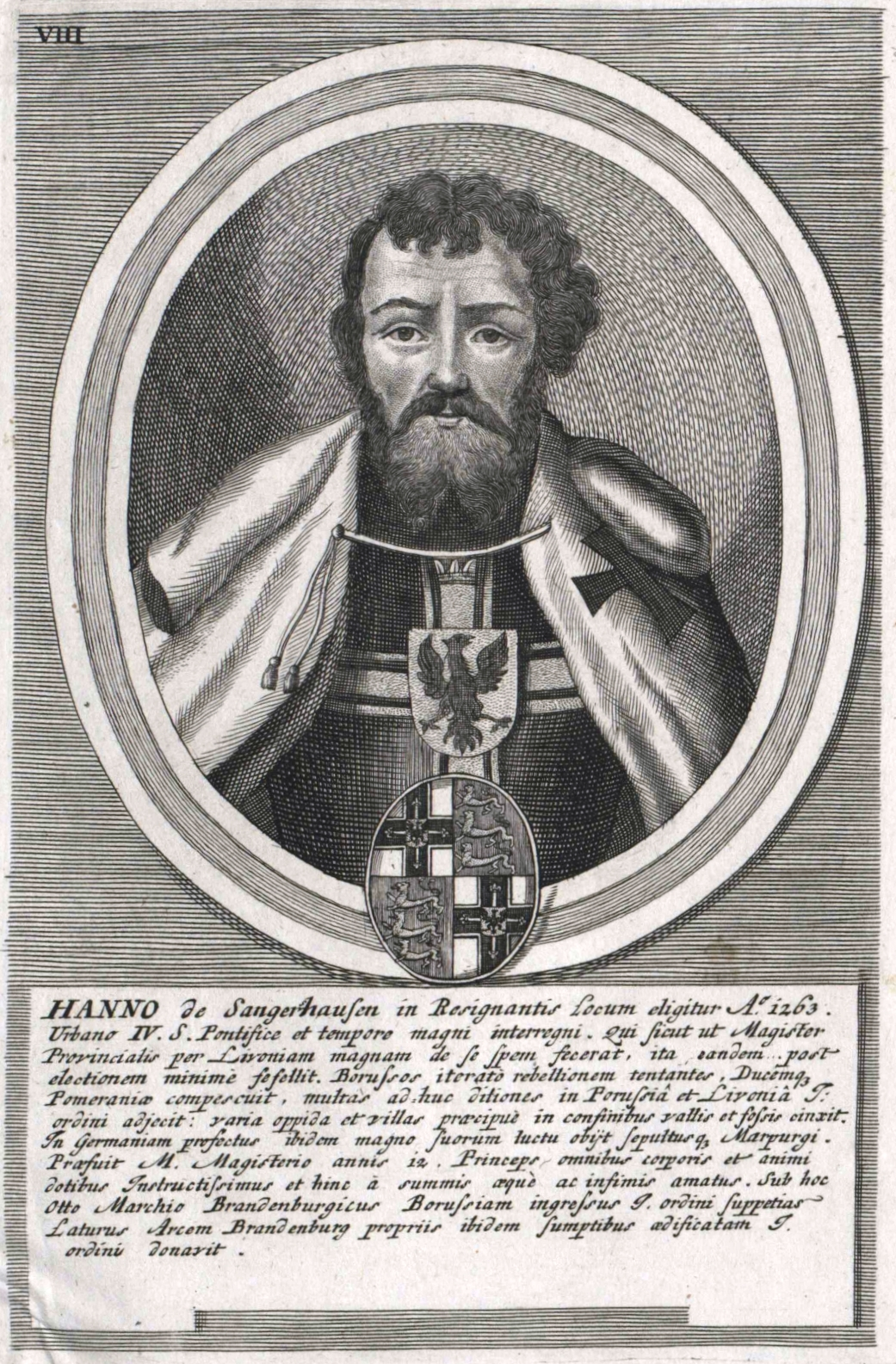
Anno von Sangerhausen

Anno von Sangerhausen (died 8 July 1273) was a German nobleman who served as the tenth Grand Master of the Teutonic Order from 1256 to 1273.

Sangerhausen originated from near Eisleben in Thuringia. His relatives were the vassals of the Thuringian counts.

In 1254 he was named as the Master of the Livonian Order. Two years later he left for the higher position as the Grand Master of the Teutonic Order which he served until his death in 1273.

Grand Master of the Teutonic Order
Preceded by Poppo von Osterna	Hochmeister; 1256–1273	Succeeded by Hartmann von Heldrungen
