= Herman VIII of Baden-Pforzheim =

Herman, Margrave of Baden-Pforzheim
- Died: before 1300
- Noble family: House of Zähringen
- Father: Herman VII, Margrave of Baden-Baden
- Mother: Agnes of Truhendingen

Herman, Margrave of Baden-Pforzheim (died before 1300) was the fourth child of Margrave Herman VII "the Waker" and his wife Agnes of Truhendingen.

A charter dated May 1296 records that his mother Agnes consented to the sale of the village of Langensteinbach to Kloster Herrenalb by her eldest son Friedrich, noting that Rudolf and Herman "nondum annos discretionis attigerant" (had not yet reached the age of discretion). He died before 1300, probably as a minor.

His brother Rudolf IV ruled Baden-Pforzheim, the northern part of the Margraviate of Baden, from 1291 until 1348.
