= Rudolf IV of Baden-Pforzheim =

Margrave of Baden-Pforzheim

Rudolf IV, Margrave of Baden-Pforzheim
- Died: 25 June 1348
- Noble family: House of Zähringen
- Spouses: Liutgard of Bolanden; Maria of Oettingen
- Issue: Frederick III; Rudolf V
- Father: Herman VII, Margrave of Baden-Baden
- Mother: Agnes of Truhendingen

Rudolf IV, Margrave of Baden-Pforzheim (died 25 June 1348) was a son of Margrave Herman VII of Baden and his wife, Agnes of Truhendingen.

As a younger son, he was initially destined for an ecclesiastical career. He became canon at Speyer. When his father died in 1291, Baden was divided and he received Baden-Pforzheim. Initially, he ruled Baden-Pforzheim jointly with his brother, Herman VIII. From 1300 until his death, he ruled alone.

In the conflict between Duke Leopold I of Austria and Emperor Louis IV, he initially sided with Leopold. After a while he changed sides and sided with Louis IV, who in 1334 mortgaged Ortenburg Castle, the cities of Offenburg, Gengenbach and Zell am Harmersbach and the imperial possessions in the Ortenau area to Rudolf IV.

In 1335, he inherited Baden-Baden from his first cousin Rudolf Hesso.

Rudolf IV died on 25 June 1348. His sons divided the inheritance, with Frederick III taking Baden-Baden and Rudolf V taking Baden-Pforzheim.

== Marriage and issue ==
Rudolf married on 28 February 1318 with Liutgard of Bolanden (d. 1324/25), a daughter of Philip V of Bolanden. This marriage remained childless.

After Liutgard's death, he married on 18 February 1326 with Countess Maria of Oettingen (d. 10 June 1369), a daughter of Count Frederick I of Oettingen. From this marriage, he had two sons:

- Frederick III (c. 1327 – 2 September 1353), Margrave of Baden-Baden, married with his second cousin Margareta, a daughter of Rudolf Hesso.
- Rudolf V (died: 1361), Margrave of Baden-Pforzheim, married on 26 August 1346 with his second cousin Adelaide of Baden, the other daughter of Rudolf Hesso.

== See also ==
- List of rulers of Baden

Rudolf IV of Baden-Pforzheim House of Zähringen Died: 25 June 1348
Preceded by Herman VII	Margrave of Baden-Pforzheim; 1291-1348 with Herman VIII until 1300	Succeeded by Rudolf V
Preceded by Rudolf Hesso	Margrave of Baden-Baden; 1335-1348	Succeeded by Frederick III
