= Herman VII of Baden-Baden =

13th Century Margrave of Baden-Baden

Herman VII, Margrave of Baden-Baden
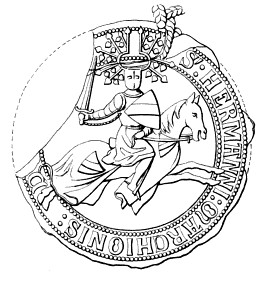
- Seal of Herman VII
- Born: 1266
- Died: 12 July 1291
- Buried: Lichtenthal Abbey
- Noble family: House of Zähringen
- Spouse: Agnes of Truhendingen
- Issue: Frederick II; Rudolf IV; Herman VIII; Jutta
- Father: Rudolf I, Margrave of Baden-Baden
- Mother: Kunigunde of Eberstein

Herman VII, Margrave of Baden-Baden, nicknamed the Rouser (German: der Wecker), (1266 – 12 July 1291), was the ruling Margrave of Baden from 1288 until his death.

He was the son of Margrave Rudolf I of Baden and his wife, Kunigunde of Eberstein (c. 1230 – 12 April 1284/90 in Lichtental), the daughter of Count Otto of Eberstein.

In 1291, he received some possessions, including Bietigheim from the Weißenburg Monastery.

He died on 12 July 1291 and was buried in Lichtenthal Abbey.

He married before 6 October 1278, to Agnes of Truhendingen (died after 15 March 1309). They had the following children:

- Frederick II (d. 22 June 1333)
- Rudolf IV, (d. 25 June 1348)
- Herman VIII, (d. 1300)
- Jutta (d. 1327)

== See also ==
- List of rulers of Baden

Herman VII of Baden-Baden House of Zähringen Born: 1266 Died: 12 July 1291
Preceded by Rudolf I	Margrave of Baden; 1288-1291	Succeeded by Frederick II
