= Elector of Trier =

Prince-Elector of the Holy Roman Empire

Coat of Arms of the Elector of Trier

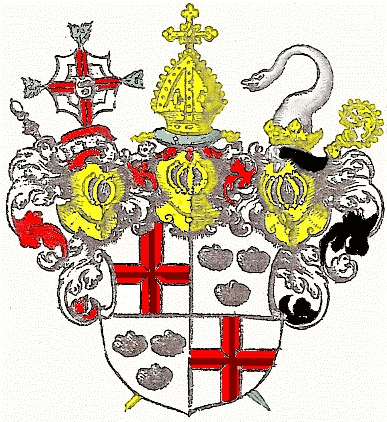
Coat of arms of the elector of Trier in 1703

The elector of Trier was one of the prince-electors of the Holy Roman Empire and, in his capacity as archbishop, administered the archdiocese of Trier. The territories of the electorate and the archdiocese were not, however, equivalent.

== History ==
The transient authority of archbishops was not gained without opposition. The German kings Otto IV and Conrad IV in 1308 granted charters to the city of Trier, authorizing the jurisdiction of its archbishop, Baldwin of Luxembourg. This prince, brother of Emperor Henry VII, who ruled from 1307 to 1354, was the real founder of the power of Trier. Although his predecessor, Diether III of Nassau, had left the electorate heavily encumbered with debt, Baldwin raised it to great prosperity with the help of the emperors Henry VII, Louis the Bavarian and Charles IV, to whom he had rendered active political and military support. He enlarged his territory almost to its ultimate extent. He assumed the title of arch-chancellor of Gaul and Aries (or Burgundy). In 1315 he accepted the claim of the archbishop of Cologne to hold the highest rank among the spiritual princes of the Empire after the archbishop of Mainz, with the elector of Trier holding third place in the electoral college. After Baldwin's death the prosperity of Trier was reduced by wars and disputes between rival claimants.

In 1456, the estates united for the purpose of restoring order and secured the right to elect their archbishop. Throughout the Middle Ages, the Sancta Civitas Trevirorum [Latin, “Holy City of Trier”] was a flourishing site of religious foundations and became a great center of monastic learning. In the latter half of the 16th century the supervision of the electorate's educational system was taken over by the Jesuits. The university, founded in 1473, continued in operation until 1797.

Archbishop-Elector Richard von Greiffenklau (1467–1531) successfully opposed the Reformation. One of his acts was the exhibition to the public of the Seamless Robe of Jesus, which is believed to have been worn by Jesus before his crucifixion. Trier thereafter became one of the major destinations of Christian pilgrims.

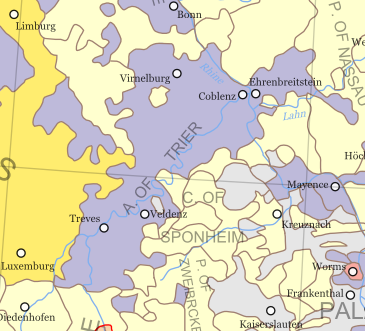
Archbishopric of Trier and County of Sponheim

During the Thirty Years' War, Archbishop-Elector Philip Christopher von Sotern favored France and accepted its protection in 1631. The following year, the French army drove all the Spanish and Swedish troops from the electorate, but in March 1635 the Spaniards returned, recaptured Trier and took the archbishop-elector prisoner. He remained in captivity for ten years, but in 1645 was reinstated by the French and confirmed in his authority by the Treaty of Westphalia. The French occupied Trier in 1674 and 1688, but each time their occupation was brief.

The last archbishop-elector, Clement Wenceslaus (1768-1802), granted toleration to the Protestants in 1782. He established his seat of power at Coblenz in 1786, but in 1794 he was forced to flee Napoleon and his Grand Army. Under the Peace of Luneville in 1801 France annexed all the territories of the Electorate of Trier to the west of the Rhine and, in 1802, the archbishop-elector abdicated. A new diocese was created for the French department of the Sarre with Trier as its seat. The electorate’s territories on the east side of the Rhine were secularized and given to Nassau-Weilburg in 1803. In 1814, at the end of the Napoleonic Wars, almost all the former lands of the electorate were allotted to Prussia together with the archdiocese. Another was founded in 1821 with virtually the same boundaries, but it was put under the control of the archbishop of Cologne.

== Archbishops of Trier ==
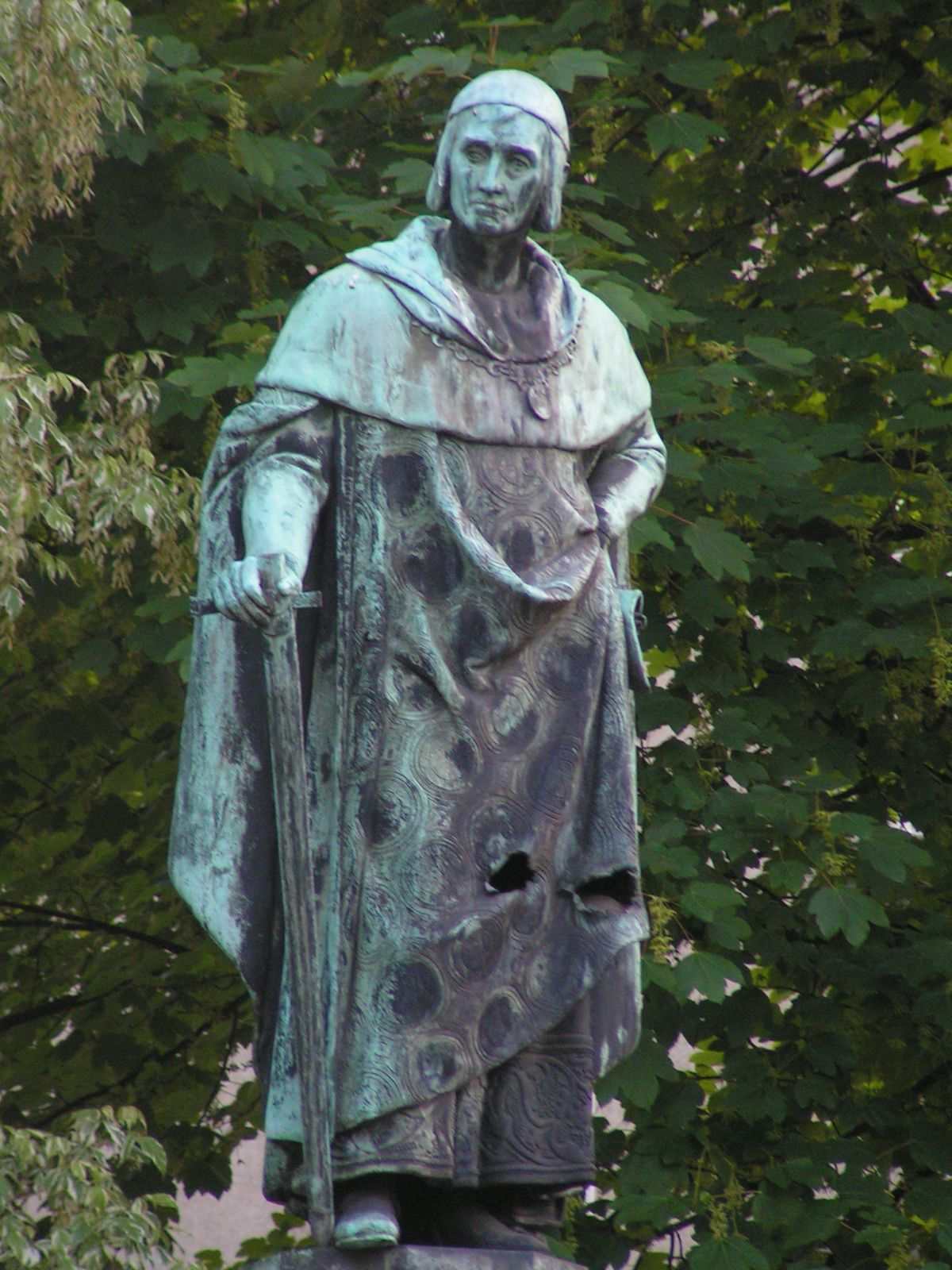
Baldwin in the Balduinbrunnen, Trier.

- Radbod 883–915
- Rudgar 915–930
- Rudbrecht 930–956
- Heinrich I 956–964
- Dietrich I 965–977
- Egbert 977–993
- Ludolf 994–1008
- Megingod 1008–1015
- Poppo von Babenberg 1016–1047
- Eberhard 1047–1066
- Kuno I von Wetterau (Conrad) 1066-1066
- Udo von Wetterau 1066–1078
- Egilbert 1079–1101
- Bruno 1101–1124
- Gottfrid 1124–1127
- Meginher 1127–1130
- Albero de Montreuil 1131–1152
- Hillin of Falmagne 1152–1169
- Arnold I of Vaucourt 1169–1183
- Folmar of Karden 1183–1189

== Archbishop-Electors of Trier ==
- John I 1189–1212
- Theodoric II (Dietrich von Wied) 1212–42
- Arnold II von Isenburg 1242–59
- Heinrich I von Finstingen 1260–86
- Bohemond I von Warnesberg 1286–99
- Diether von Nassau 1300–07
- Heinrich II von Virneburg 1300–06 (in opposition)
- Baldwin von Luxemburg 1307–54
- Bohemond II von Saarbrücken 1354–61
- Kuno II von Falkenstein 1362–88
- Werner von Falkenstein 1388–1417
- Lenihan von Weideburg 1417–1419
- Otto von Ziegenhain 1419–30
- Rhaban von Helmstadt 1430–38
- Jakob von Sierk 1439–56
- Johann II of Baden 1456–1503
- Jakob von Baden 1503–11
- Richard von Greiffenklau zu Vollrads 1511–31
- Johann von Metzenhausen 1531–40
- Johann Ludwig von Hagen 1540–47
- John of Isenburg-Grenzau 1547–56
- Johann von der Leyen 1556–67
- Jakob von Eltz-Rübenach 1567–81
- Johann von Schönenberg 1581–99
- Lothar von Metternich 1599–1623
- Philipp Christoph von Sötern 1623–52
- Karl Kaspar von der Leyen-Hohengeroldseck 1652–76
- Johann Hugo von Orsbeck 1676–1711
- Charles Joseph of Lorraine 1711–15
- Franz Ludwig of Palatinate-Neuburg 1716–29
- Franz Georg von Schönborn-Buchheim 1729–56
- Johann Philipp von Walderdorf 1756–68
- Prince Clemens Wenceslaus of Saxony 1768–1803
