= Jakob II von Baden =

Archbishop-Elector of Trier

- Archbishop-Elector of Trier
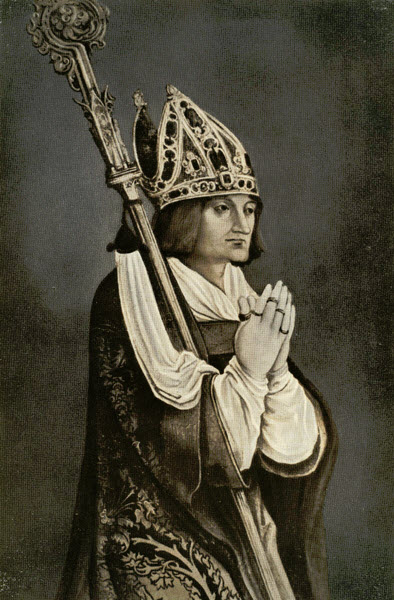
- Church: Catholic Church
- Archdiocese: Trier
- In office: 1503–1511
- Predecessor: John II of Baden
- Successor: Richard von Greiffenklau

Personal details
- Born: 6 June 1471
- Died: 27 April 1511 (aged 39)

Jakob II von Baden (6 June 1471 – 27 April 1511) was a German nobleman who served as Archbishop and Elector of Trier from 1503 until his death in 1511.

== Biography ==
Jakob von Baden was born at the Burg Hohenbaden in Baden-Baden on 6 June 1471, the second child and eldest son of Christopher I, Margrave of Baden-Baden and his wife Ottilie of Katzenelnbogen. He studied Christian theology at the University of Bologna and the Sapienza University of Rome.

In 1490, Jakob von Baden became provost of St. Paulinus' Church in Trier; he became Domizellar the next year. In 1497, he became a member of the cathedral chapter of Mainz Cathedral, and in 1498, a member of the cathedral chapter of Augsburg Cathedral.

In 1500, Jakob von Baden's uncle, John II of Baden, Archbishop of Trier, had Jakob named his coadjutor archbishop, with the understanding that Jakob von Baden would succeed Johann von Baden as archbishop. Pope Alexander VI approved this arrangement on 11 September 1500. Upon his uncle's death on 9 February 1503, Jakob von Baden became Archbishop of Trier. He was consecrated as a bishop in January 1504. During his time as archbishop, he reorganized the finances of the Archbishopric of Trier, supported the new University of Trier, and served as chair for several imperial mediations.

He died on 27 April 1511 in Cologne. He was buried in the collegiate church of Saint Florian in Koblenz. On 25 June 1808 he was disinterred and his remains transferred to the family crypt of the House of Baden.

== Ancestors ==
Ancestors of Jakob II von Baden

16. Bernard I, Margrave of Baden-Baden
8. Jacob, Margrave of Baden-Baden
17. Anna of Oettingen
4. Charles I, Margrave of Baden-Baden
18. Charles II, Duke of Lorraine
9. Catherine de Lorraine
19. Margaret of the Palatinate
2. Christopher I, Margrave of Baden
20. Leopold III, Duke of Austria
10. Ernest, Duke of Austria
21. Viridis Visconti
5. Catherine of Austria
22. Siemowit IV of Masovia
11. Cymburgis of Masovia
23. Alexandra of Lithuania
1. Jakob of Baden
24. John IV, Count of Katzenelnbogen
12. Philip I, Count of Katzenelnbogen
25. Anne of Katzenelnbogen
6. Philip II of Katzenelnbogen
26. Eberhard IV, Count of Württemberg
13. Anna of Württemberg
27. Henriette of Mömpelgard
3. Ottilie of Katzenelnbogen
28. Engelbert I of Nassau
14. Henry II, Count of Nassau-Siegen
29. Johanna van Polanen
7. Ottilie of Nassau-Siegen
30. Rupert IV of Virneburg
15. Genoveva of Virneburg
31. Agnes of Solms-Braunfels

Jakob von Baden House of Zähringen Born: 6 June 1471 Died: 27 April 1511
Catholic Church titles
Regnal titles
Preceded by John II of Baden	Archbishop-Elector of Trier as Jakob II; 1503–1511	Succeeded by Richard von Greiffenklau zu Vollrads
