= Jacob, Margrave of Baden-Baden =

Jacob I of Baden
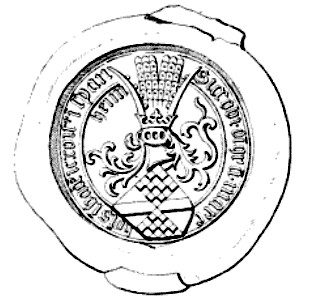
- Born: 15 March 1407; Hachberg
- Died: 13 October 1453 (aged 46); Mühlburg
- Noble family: House of Zähringen
- Spouses: Catherine de Lorraine (m. 1422 – wid. 1439)
- Issue: Charles I Bernard II; John; Margarete; George; Markus; Matilde: illegitimate Rudolf
- Father: Bernard I, Margrave of Baden-Baden
- Mother: Anna of Oettingen

Jacob I of Baden (15 March 1407 – 13 October 1453), was Margrave of Baden-Baden from 1431 to 1453.

He was the elder son of Bernard I, Margrave of Baden-Baden and his second wife Anna of Oettingen. Jacob I was a man of deep religious beliefs, well known as a founder of churches. He founded the monastery at Fremersberg and was a major benefactor of the Stiftskirche at Baden-Baden.

According to his father's precepts, only two of his sons were to be considered heirs of the margravate. Therefore, only Charles and Bernard received a secular education; the other children had a strict religious upbringing. George, after taking a religious profession in his youth, returned briefly to the world, but in 1454 reverted to holy orders and later became Bishop of Metz.

Jacob I was the opposite of his father; Enea Silvio de Piccolomini (Pope Pius II) characterized him as famous among the Germans for his justice and intelligence.

In his early years he was ruler of the family possessions in Hohenberg, until at the age of 24 he succeeded to the government of Baden. He was described as a pugnacious knight and a frugal father of the state and was popular among the princes as a mediator. Both Emperor Sigismund and Emperor Frederick III, under whom he served, thought highly of him.

When as the result of a miscarriage his sister Agnes fled in the middle of a conflict about inheritance, the Margrave lost his claim to the Duchy of Schleswig. He was so angry that he confined Agnes for the rest of her life in Eberstein Castle in Ebersteinburg. (The incident is remembered as the "Double Disaster of Gottorf").

When in 1437 the Treaty of Sponheim came into force, Jacob and Frederick III, Count of Veldenz jointly inherited the County of Sponheim on the death of John V, Count of Sponheim-Starkenburg, thus gaining possessions on the Moselle. In 1442 he bought for 30,000 guilders from the descendants of Walter von Geroldseck half the lordship of Lahr and Mahlberg.

== Family and children ==
Jakob married 25 July 1418 Catherine, daughter of Charles II, Duke of Lorraine and Margaret of the Palatinate. They had the following children:

1. Charles I, Margrave of Baden-Baden (1427 – 24 February 1475, Pforzheim), married Catherine of Austria
2. Bernard II, Margrave of Baden-Baden (later beatified) (1428 – 12 July 1458, Moncalieri).
3. John (1430 – 9 February 1503, Ehrenbreitstein), Archbishop of Trier.
4. Margarete (1431 – 24 October 1457, Ansbach), married 1446 to Albert III, Margrave of Brandenburg
5. George (1433 – 11 February 1484, Moyen), Bishop of Metz.
6. Markus (1434 – 1 September 1478), canon in Liége and Strassburg.
7. Matilde (1435/39 – 18 April 1485), Abbess in Trier.

He also had an illegitimate son, Rudolf of Baden.

== Sources ==
- Hohkamp, Michaela (2007). "Sisters, Aunts, and Cousins: Familial Architectures and the Political Field in Early Modern Europe". In Sabean, David Warren; Teuscher, Simon; Mathieu, Jon (eds.). Kinship in Europe: Approaches to Long-Term Development (1300-1900). Berghahn books. pp. 91–104.

== See also ==
- List of rulers of Baden

Jacob, Margrave of Baden-Baden House of Zähringen Born: 14 March 1407 Died: 13 October 1453
| Preceded by Bernard I | Margrave of Baden-Baden; 1431–1453 | Succeeded by Charles I and Bernard II |
