= 1519 imperial election =

Election for Holy Roman Emperor

1519 Imperial Election
- 28 June 1519

7 Prince-Electors 4 votes needed to win
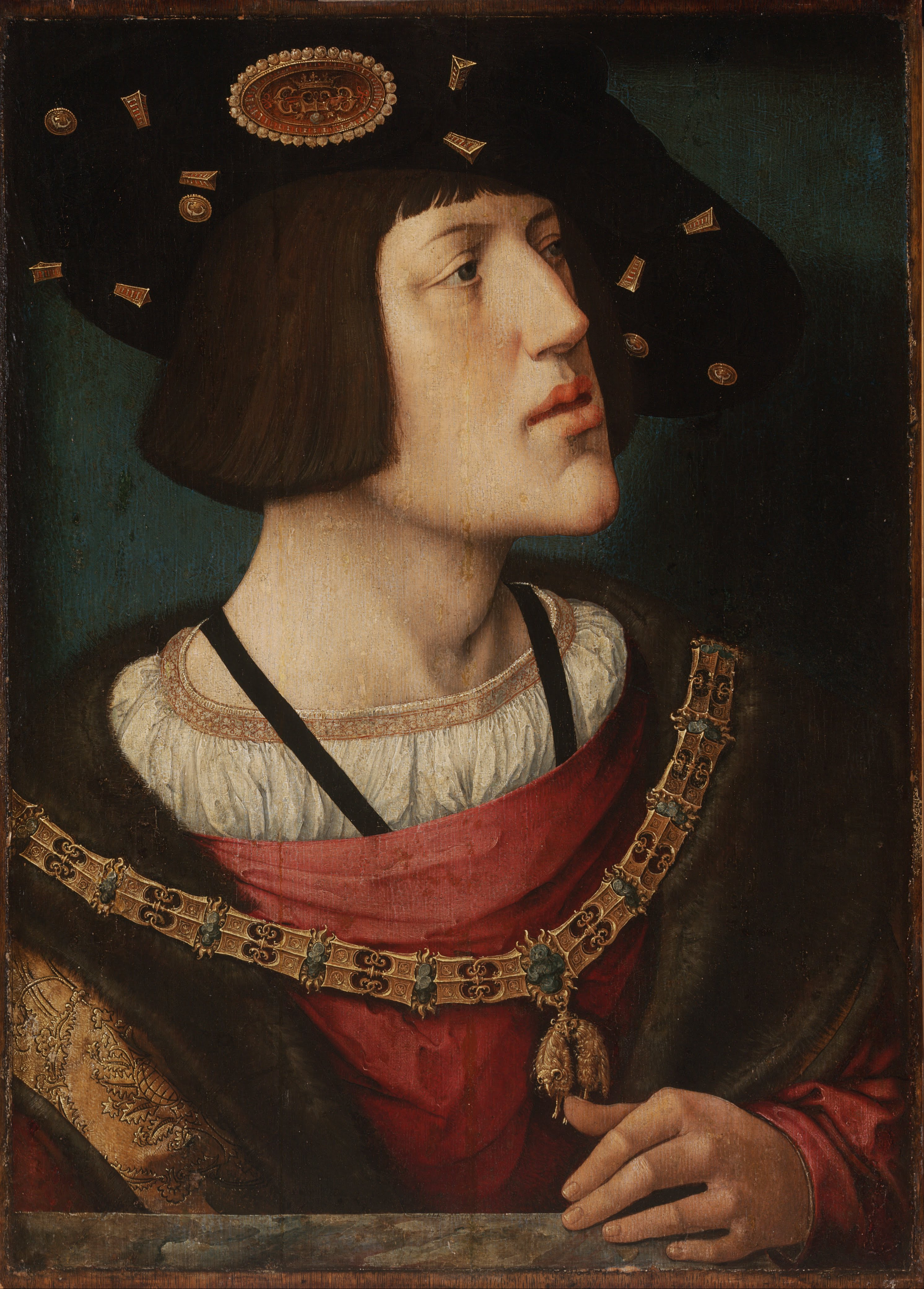

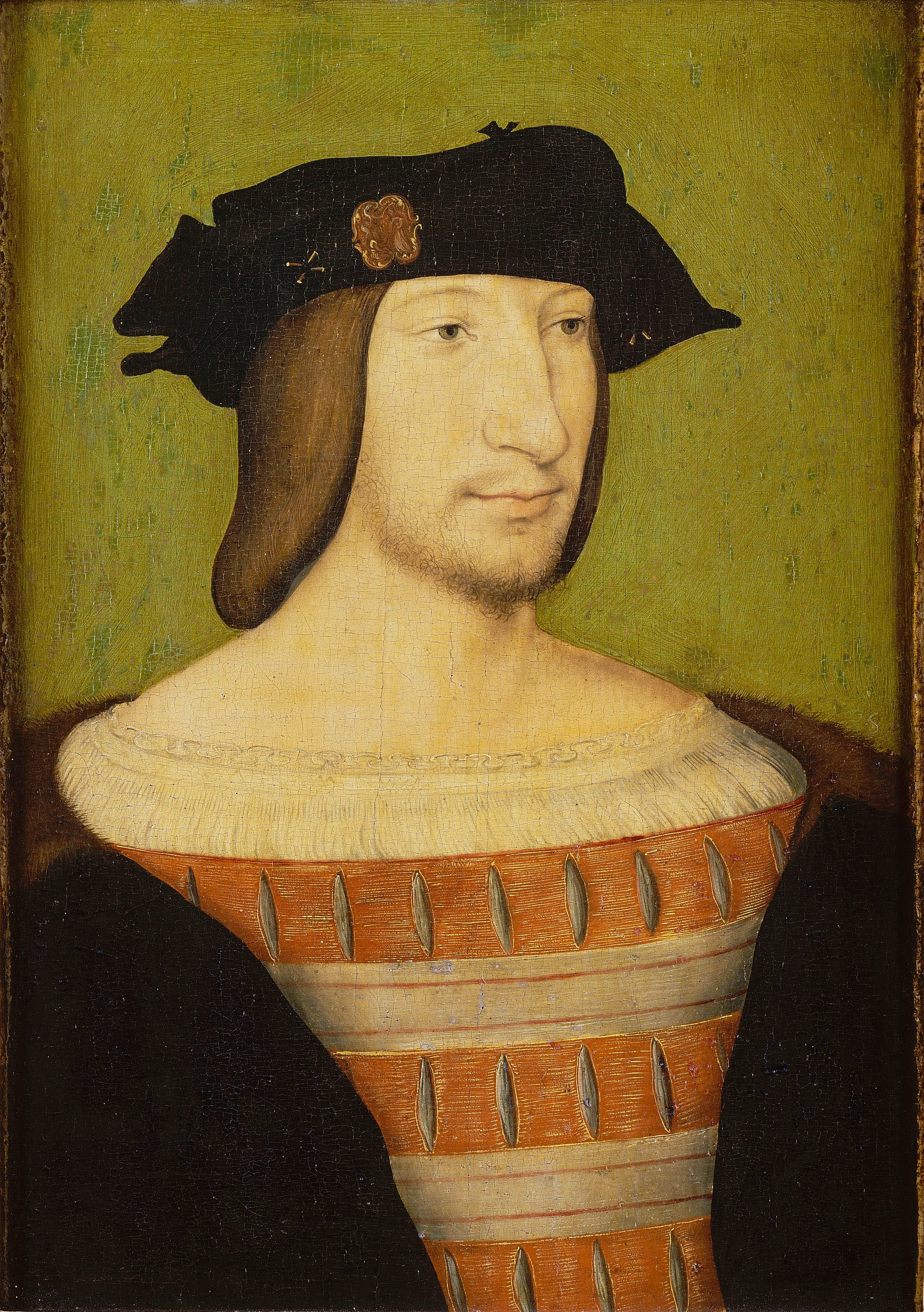

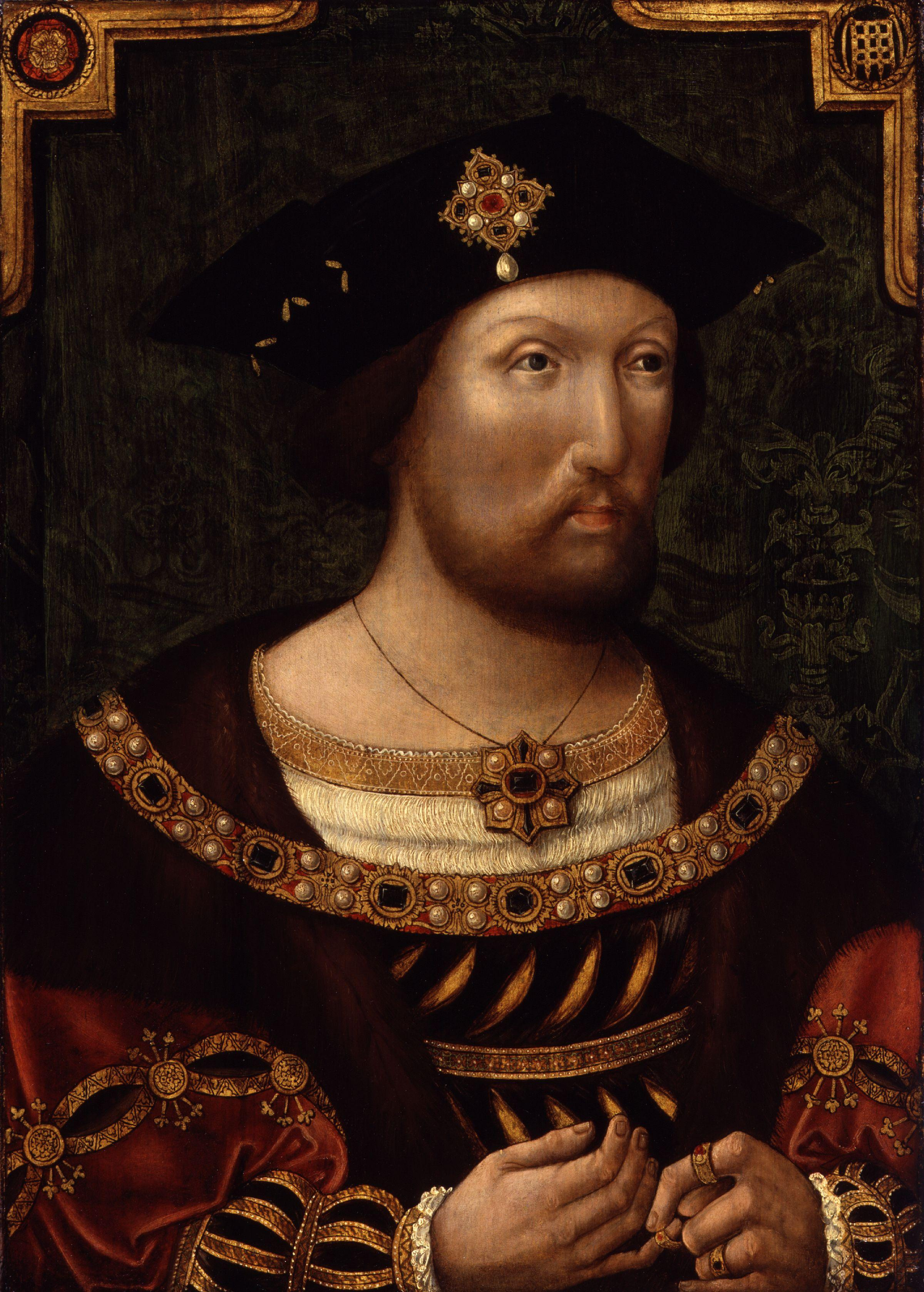
Candidate	Charles V	Francis I of France	Henry VIII
House	Habsburg	Valois-Angoulême	Tudor
Electoral vote	7	0	0
Percentage	100%	0%	0%
Emperor before election
Maximilian I
House of Habsburg
Elected Emperor
Charles V
House of Habsburg

The Imperial Election of 1519 was an imperial election held to select the next Holy Roman Emperor after the death of Maximilian I, Holy Roman Emperor. It took place in Frankfurt on 28 June. Charles V was then elected and crowned Holy Roman Emperor the next year.

== Background ==
The election followed the death of Maximilian I, Holy Roman Emperor on 12 January 1519.

The two main candidates were his grandson Charles, King of Spain, and King Francis I of France. Maximilian’s son and Charles’s father, Philip "The Handsome", had died already in 1506. Henry VIII of England, king of England, also presented himself as a candidate albeit with no hereditary claim. Francis I of France also contested the election, relying on his military strength and rivalry with the Habsburgs.

Electing an emperor who was also the ruler of a kingdom outside of the empire had not happened since the king of Sicily, Frederick II, Holy Roman Emperor was elected in 1212 nearly 300 years prior. France and the empire had not been joined since the days of the Carolingian dynasty.

The seven prince-electors called to elect Maximilian's successor were:

- Albert of Brandenburg, Elector of Mainz
- Richard von Greiffenklau zu Vollrads, Elector of Trier
- Hermann of Wied, Elector of Cologne
- Louis I, King of Bohemia, who was underaged at the time and his rights were exercised by his legal guardian and uncle, Sigismund I the Old, King of Poland, who was married to Charles' younger sister, Mary of Hungary.
- Louis V, Elector of the Electoral Palatinate
- Frederick III, Elector of Saxony
- Joachim I Nestor, Elector of Brandenburg

Charles and Francis competed to exceed one another in their bribery of the remaining electors.

== Election ==
Charles was the head of the Austrian House of Habsburg after the death of his grandfather Maximilian, but he was born in the Habsburg Netherlands, had grown up speaking French and Dutch, was in Spain at the time of the election, and had not yet been to Germany or learned German. Thus, there was a risk that he could be felt to be as much of a foreigner as Francis. However, Charles advised the princes against electing a foreign king and declared himself a "German by blood and stock".

Therefore, he launched a relentless propaganda campaign in which he shifted the narrative to claim his heritage as the head of a German dynasty and as the grandson of Maximilian (previous Holy Roman Emperor) and presented Francis as nothing more than a 'foreign adventurer', fostering fears of foreign interference in German affairs. Consequentially, he obtained 'German sympathies', making his election more attractive.

Another factor in favour of Charles was that he, as the ruler of sparse states in the Low Countries, Spain, and Austria, was less likely to impose his personal ambitions over German princes as he would also be pre-occupied on his other affairs. In contingency with this notion, Charles promised to guarantee 'German liberties'. At the same time, the threat of military force from the Swabian League, formed in 1488 and sympathetic towards Charles's Habsburg background, also influenced the result.

Henry sought the throne through diplomacy. He sent his secretary, Richard Pace, to Germany to sound out the electors, but Pace's meeting with them in June and July 1519 failed to secure support for the English king. Although Richard Pace later blamed the failure on a late arrival in Germany, it was the massive bribes that Charles and Francis were offering the prince-electors that ultimately ensured Henry could not win.

In addition, Charles had deeper pockets. Francis had bought the elector of Trier; up for grabs were the electors of Mainz, Brandenburg, and the Palatinate. Although full details of the election were never revealed, it is possible that the electors sought a way out of their dilemma by electing Frederick III of Saxony as emperor, but that he turned them down.

All these factors made Charles's election much more attractive than his competition. In the end, Charles was elected unanimously.

== Aftermath ==
Charles was crowned at Aachen on 26 October 1520 and his Papal coronation was by Pope Clement VII in Bologna on 22 February 1530. He was the last emperor to accept any coronation by any Pope. His reign lasted until his abdication in favor of his brother, Ferdinand I, in 1556.
