= Frederick IV of Baden =

Bishop of Utrecht from 1496 to 1517

Frederick of Baden
- Bishop of Utrecht
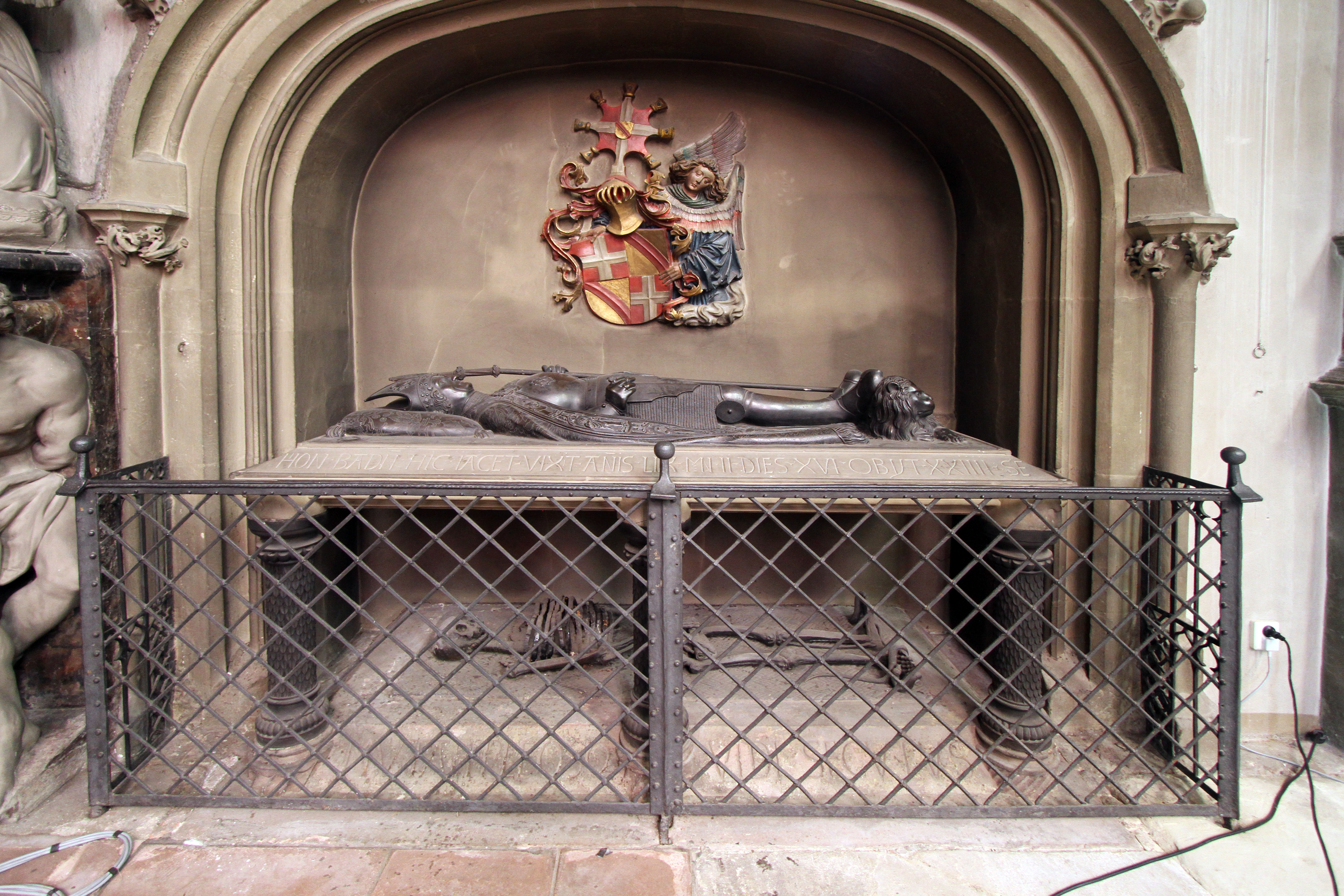
- Tomb in the Stiftskirche of Baden-Baden
- Church: Catholic Church
- Diocese: Utrecht
- In office: 1496–1517

Personal details
- Born: 1458
- Died: 24 September 1517 (aged 58–59) Lier, Duchy of Brabant, Habsburg Netherlands

Frederik of Baden (1458 – 24 September 1517, Lier) was a German nobleman who served as Bishop of Utrecht from 1496 until his resignation in 1517.

Frederick of Baden was the son of Margrave Charles I of Baden-Baden and Catherine of Austria, sister of Frederick III, Holy Roman Emperor.

He was canon at Cologne before he was elected as bishop of Utrecht through heavy pressure from Maximilian I, Holy Roman Emperor. The Emperor hoped that Frederik, as a full nephew, would be favourable to Habsburg interests in the bishopric of Utrecht.

The states of Utrecht, however, were on an independent course and approached Duke Charles of Guelders. Frederick attempted to act strongly, but the faction-struggles became too much for him.

When it was revealed in 1514 that he was planning to relinquish the bishopric to a candidate of King Louis XII of France, he lost the support of Charles V, Holy Roman Emperor, who forced him to resign on 9 May 1517. Charles then managed to get Philip of Burgundy elected.

After his death, Frederick was interred in the church of Baden-Baden.

Frederick IV of Baden House of Zähringen Born: 1458 Died: 24 September 1517
Preceded by David of Burgundy	Bishop of Utrecht; 1496–1517	Succeeded by Philip of Burgundy
