= Albert, Margrave of Baden-Hachberg =

Margrave of Baden-Hachberg

- Born: 1456; Hachberg Castle
- Died: 1488 (aged 31–32); Damme
- Noble family: House of Zähringen
- Father: Charles I, Margrave of Baden-Baden
- Mother: Catherine of Austria

Albert, Margrave of Baden-Hachberg (1456 at Hachberg Castle – 1488 in Damme) was a Margrave of Baden.

He was the son of Margrave Charles I of Baden and Catherine of Austria. In 1475, Charles I died and Albert and his elder brother Christopher I inherited the margraviate. At first, they ruled jointly, however, in 1476, they divided their inheritance. Albert received the County of Hochberg and Christopher ruled Baden-Baden alone. However, Albert immediately transferred Hochberg to his brother, in exchange for an annual pension, so that the margraviate remained de facto undivided.

The division agreement was initially limited to a period of six years, which expired in 1482. In that year, the brothers decided to extend the agreement indefinitely. When Albert died childless in 1488, Hochberg fell back to Christopher.
