= Nikolaus Schienen =

German prelate (1491–1556)

Most Reverend Nikolaus Schienen
- Auxiliary Bishop Emeritus of Trier; Titular Bishop of Azotus
- Church: Catholic Church
- Diocese: Diocese of Trier
- In office: 1519–1556

Personal details
- Born: 1491 Zell, Germany
- Died: 21 Aug 1556 (age 65) Trier, Germany

Nikolaus Schienen (1491–1556) was a Roman Catholic prelate who served as Auxiliary Bishop of Trier (1519–1556).

== Biography ==
Nikolaus Schienen was born Zell, Germany in 1491. On 29 Oct 1519, he was appointed during the papacy of Pope Leo X as Auxiliary Bishop of Trier and Titular Bishop of Azotus. He served as Auxiliary Bishop of Trier until his death on 21 Aug 1556. While bishop, he was the principal consecrator of Johann von Metzenhausen, Archbishop of Trier (1532).
