= Catherine of Lorraine, Margravine of Baden-Baden =

Catherine of Lorraine
- Born: 1407
- Died: 1 March 1439
- Noble family: House of Lorraine
- Spouse: Jacob, Margrave of Baden-Baden
- Father: Charles II, Duke of Lorraine
- Mother: Margaret of the Palatinate

Catherine of Lorraine (1407 – 1 March 1439) was Margravine of Baden-Baden by marriage to Margrave Jacob of Baden-Baden.

She was the daughter of Duke Charles II of Lorraine and the countess Margaret of the Palatinate.

She married on 25 July 1418 with Margrave Jacob of Baden-Baden. They had the following children:

1. Charles I, Margrave of Baden-Baden (d. 24 February 1475, Pforzheim).
2. Bernard II, Margrave of Baden-Baden (later beatified) (1428–12 July 1458, Moncalieri).
3. John (1430–9 February 1503, Ehrenbreitstein), Archbishop of Trier.
4. George (1433–11 February 1484, Moyen), Bishop of Metz.
5. Markus (1434–1 September 1478), abbot in Liège.
6. Margarete (1431–24 October 1457, Ansbach), married 1446 to Albert III, Margrave of Brandenburg.
7. Matilde (d. 1485), Abbess of Trier.

Catherine died in 1439.
