= Electorate of Trier =

State of the Holy Roman Empire (898–1801)

Coordinates: 49°46′N 6°39′E

Electorate of Trier Kurfürstentum Trier (German) Électorat de Trèves (French)
- 898–1801
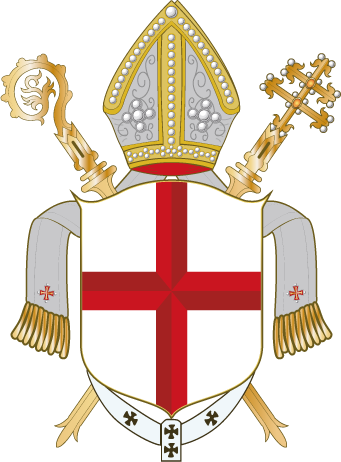
- Flag Coat of arms

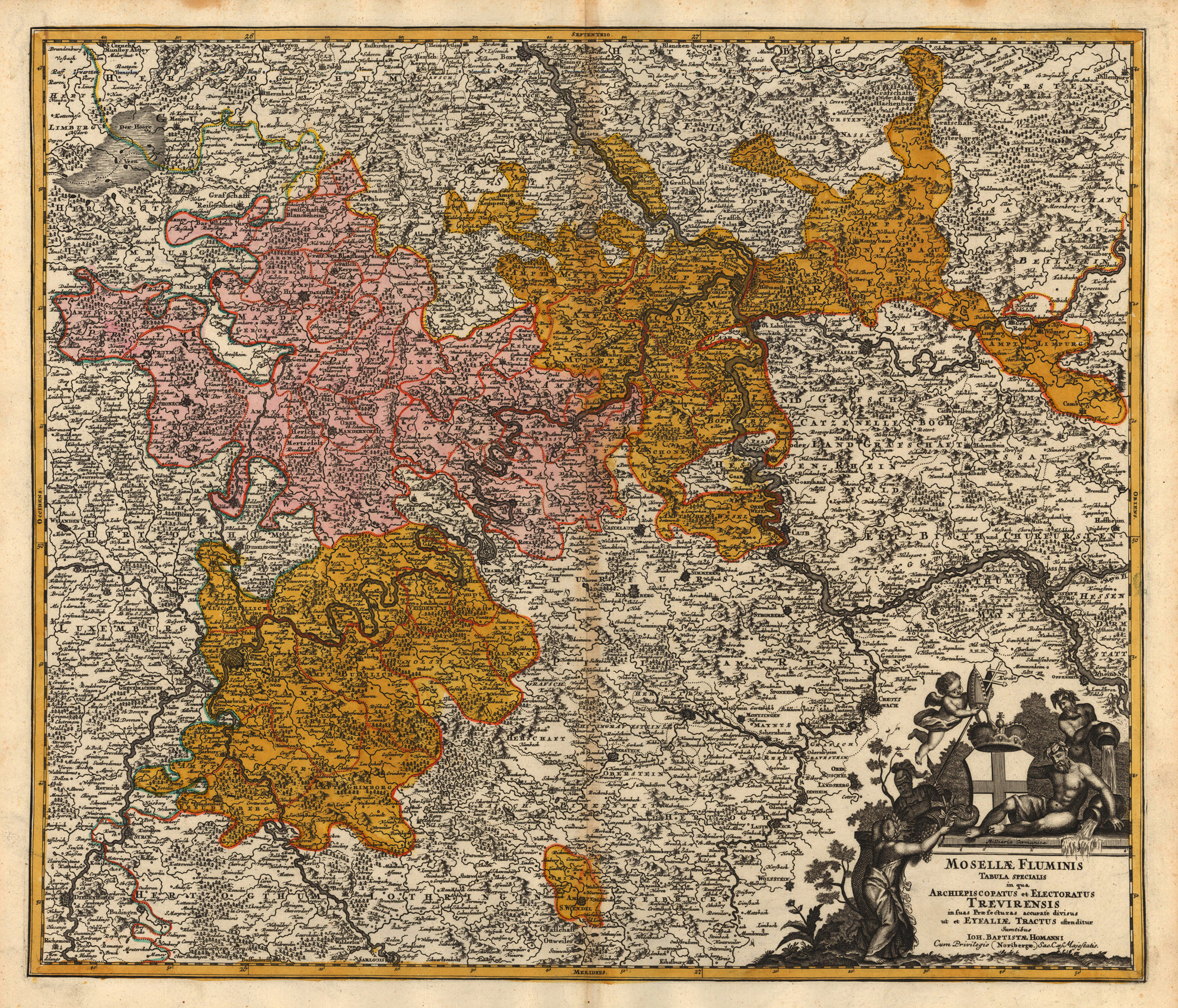
- The Electorate of Trier in 1720
- Status: State of the Holy Roman Empire
- Capital: Trier, Ehrenbreitstein
- Common languages: French; Latin; Luxembourgish; Moselle Franconian German
- Religion: Catholic Church
- Government: Prince-Bishopric
- Elector of Trier
  - 1768–1803: Prince Clemens Wenceslaus of Saxony
- Historical era: Middle Ages; Early Modern
  - Autonomy granted: 772
  - Imperial immediacy: 898
  - Raised to electorate: between 1189 and 1212
  - Trier city rights: 1212
  - Joined Electoral Rhenish Circle: 1512
  - Treaty of Lunéville: 9 February 1801
  - Reconstituted as Grand Duchy of the Lower Rhine within Prussia: 9 June 1815
Preceded by
| List of counts palatine of the Rhine |
Succeeded by
| Rhin-et-Moselle |
| Sarre (department) |
| House of Nassau-Weilburg |

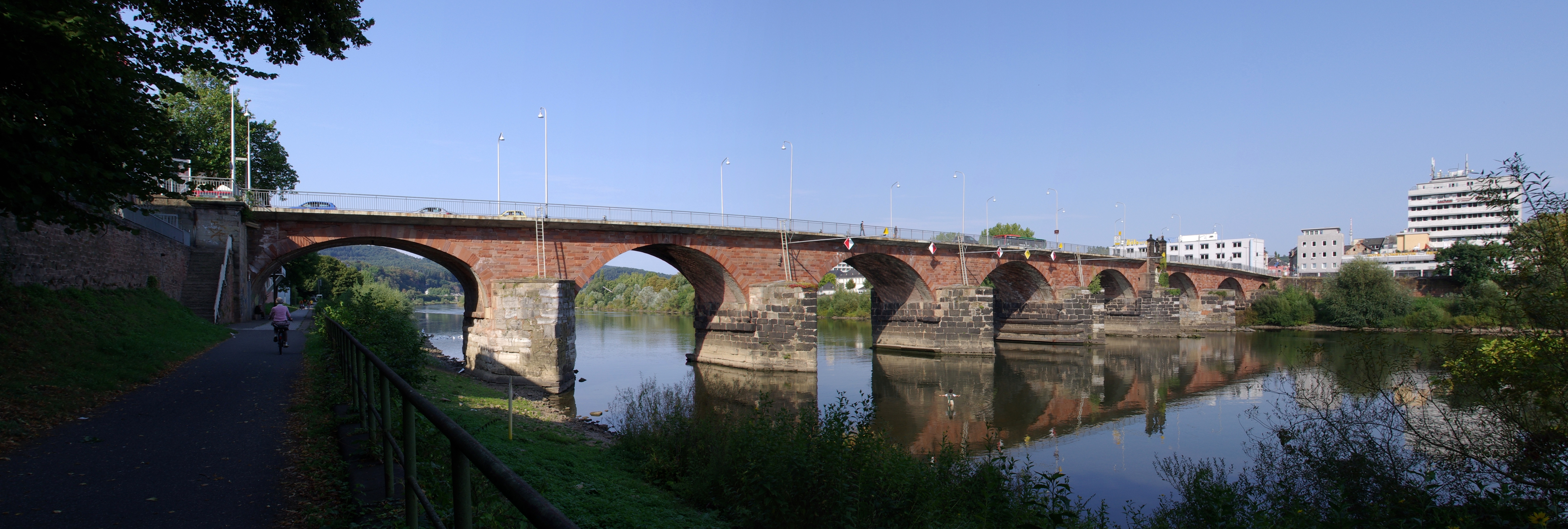
The Roman Bridge across the Moselle River

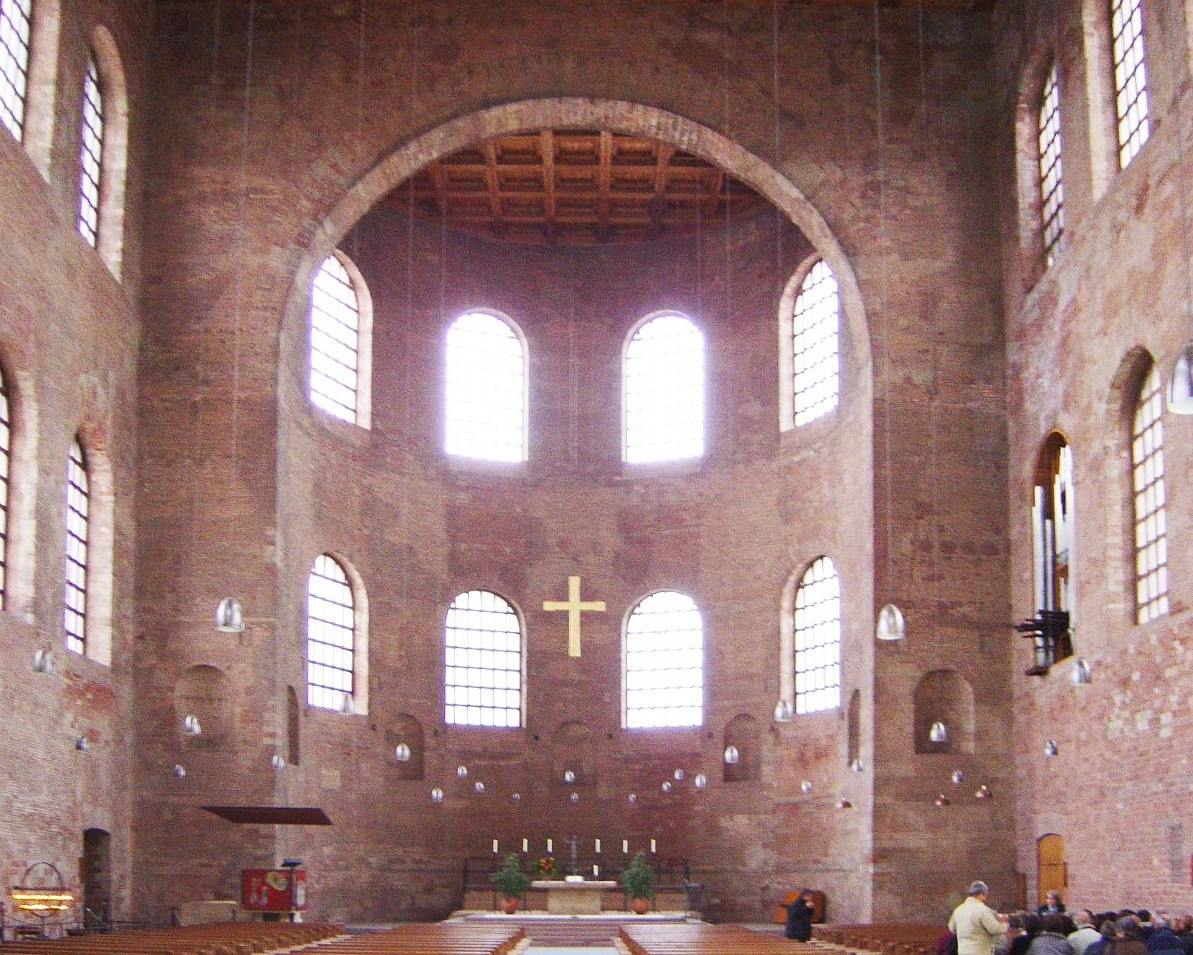
The Constantine Basilica in Trier (Aula Palatina)

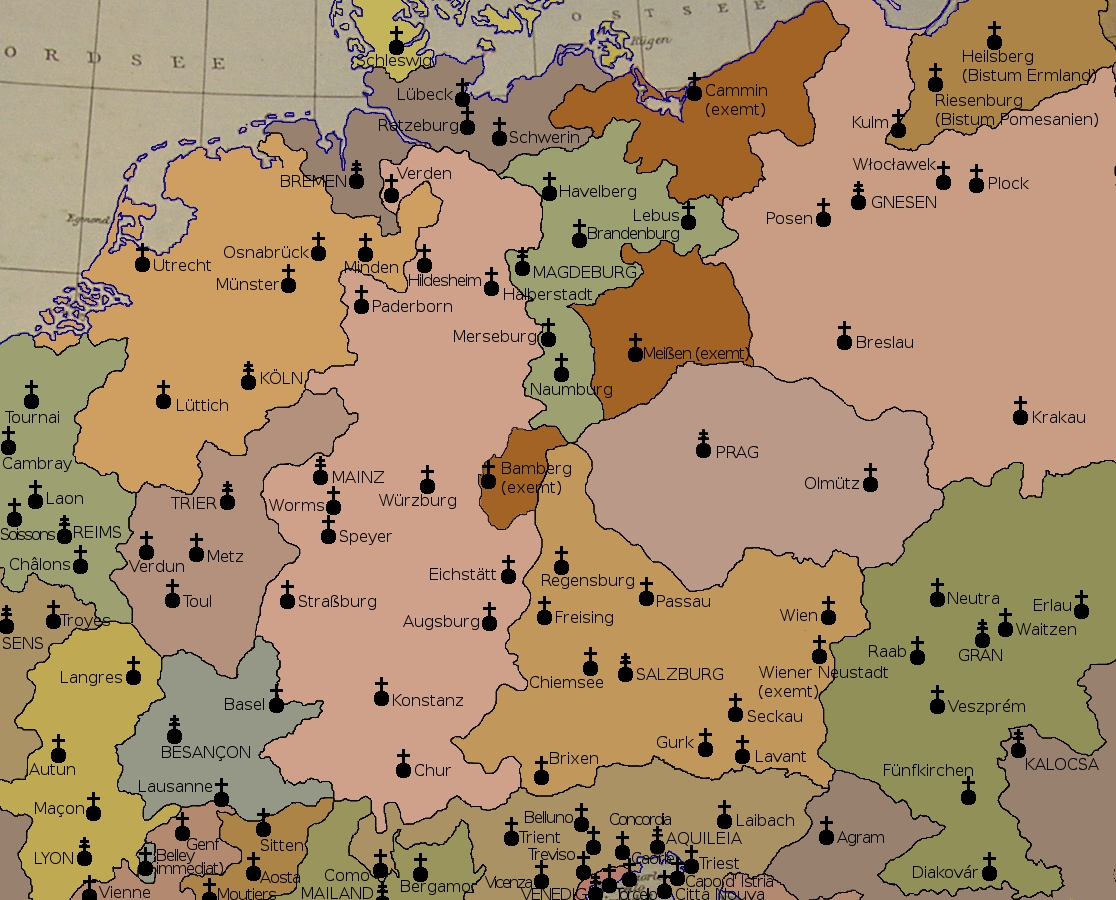
Archdioceses of Central Europe, 1500

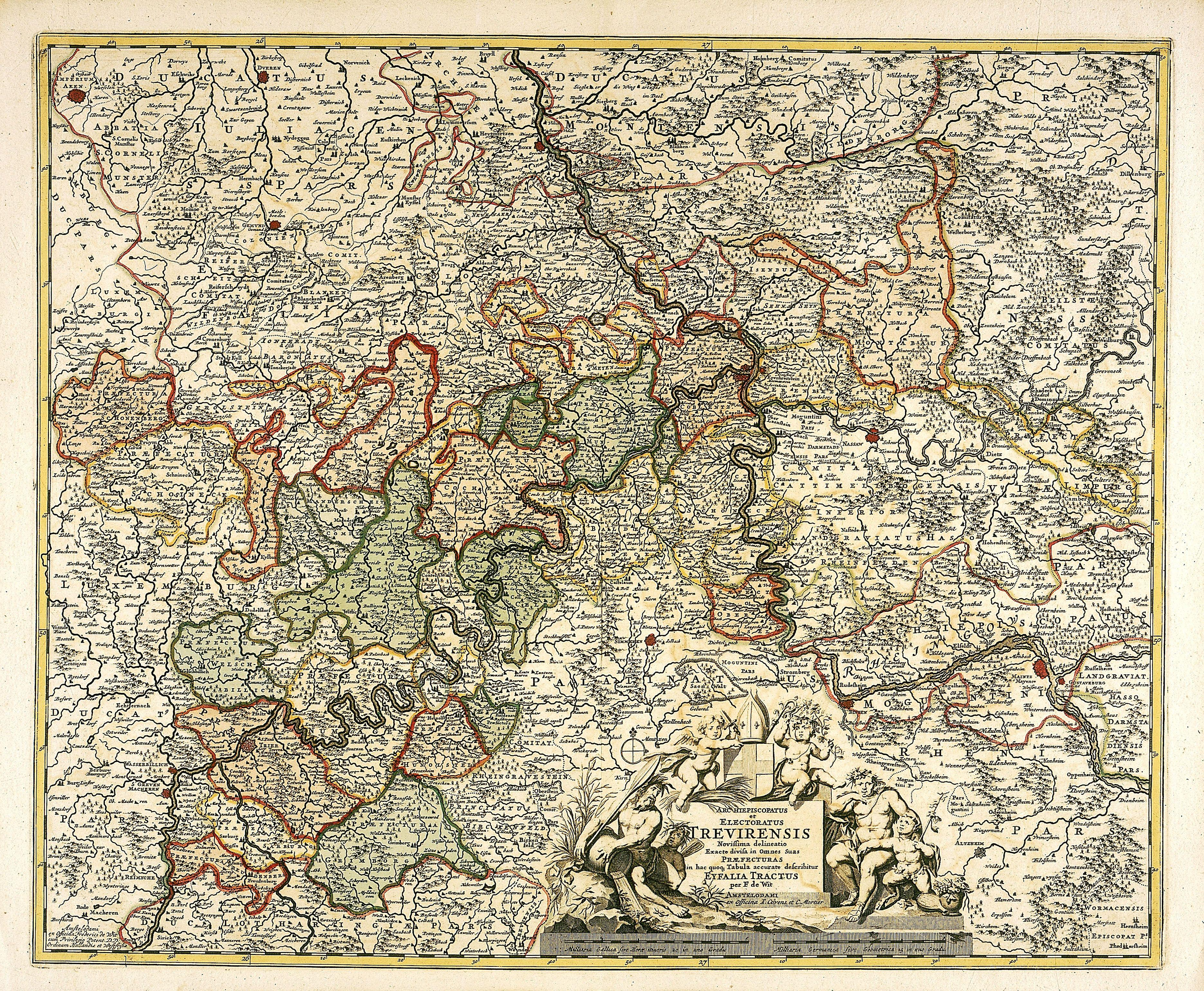
Map from the 18th century by Frederik de Wit

The Electorate of Trier (German: Kurfürstentum Trier or Kurtrier; French: Trèves) was an ecclesiastical principality of the Holy Roman Empire that existed from the end of the 9th to the early 19th century. It was the temporal possession of the prince-archbishop of Trier (Erzbistum Trier) who was, ex officio, a prince-elector of the empire. The other ecclesiastical electors were the archbishops (in the secular context called simply electors) of Cologne and Mainz.

The capital of the electorate was Trier; from the 16th century onward, the main residence of the Elector was in Koblenz. The electorate was secularized in 1803 in the course of the German mediatisation.

The Elector of Trier, in his capacity as archbishop, also administered the Archdiocese of Trier, whose territory did not correspond to the electorate (see map below).

== History ==
=== Middle Ages ===
Trier, as the important Roman provincial capital of Augusta Treverorum, had been the seat of a bishop since Roman times. It was raised to archiepiscopal status during the reign of Charlemagne, whose will mentions the bishoprics of Metz, Toul and Verdun as its suffragans.

The bishops of Trier were already virtually independent territorial magnates during the Merovingian dynasty. In 772, Charlemagne granted Bishop Wiomad complete immunity from the jurisdiction of the ruling count for all the churches and monasteries, as well as villages and castles that belonged to the Church of St. Peter at Trier. In 816 Louis the Pious confirmed to Archbishop Hetto the privileges of protection and immunity granted by his father.

At the partition of the Carolingian Empire at Verdun in 843, Trier was given to Lothair; at the partition of Lotharingia at Mersen in 870, it became part of the East Frankish kingdom, which developed into the Kingdom of Germany.

In 898, Archbishop Radbod received complete immunity from all taxes for the entire episcopal territory, granted by Zwentibold, who was the natural son of Emperor Arnulf of Carinthia, and who reigned briefly as King of Lotharingia. He was under great pressure from his independent nobles and desperately needed a powerful ally. The gift cemented the position of the archbishops as territorial lords in their own right. Following Zwentibold's assassination in 900, the handlers of the child-king Louis courted Radbod in their turn, granting him the district and city of Trier outright, permission to impose customs duties and the right to a mint (as much a symbol of independent authority as an economic tool). From the court of Charles the Simple, he obtained the final right of election of the Bishop of Trier by the chapter, free of Imperial interference.

=== Early modern ===
In early modern times, the Electorate of Trier still encompassed territory along the river Moselle between Trier, near the French border, and Koblenz on the Rhine. From the early 13th century the Archbishop of Trier, as the holder of an imperial office was traditionally an Imperial Elector of the German king. The purely honorary office of Arch-chancellor of Gaul arose in the 13th century. In this context, that was taken to mean the Kingdom of Burgundy-Arles, technically from 1242 and permanently from 1263, and nominally until 1803. Arles along with Germany and the medieval Kingdom of Italy was one of the three component kingdoms of the Holy Roman Empire.

In 1473, Emperor Frederick III and Charles the Bold, Duke of Burgundy held a meeting in Trier. In this same year, the University of Trier was founded in the city. A session of the Reichstag was held in Trier in 1512, during which the demarcation of the Imperial Circles was definitively established. Between 1581 and 1593, the Trier witch trials gravely affected the entire territory; it was one of the first mass witch trials of the Holy Roman Empire, and resulted in the death of hundreds of people.

In the 17th century, the Archbishops and Prince-Electors of Trier relocated their residences to Philippsburg Castle in Ehrenbreitstein, near Koblenz.

During the Thirty Years' War, Archbishop-Elector Philipp Christoph von Sötern supported France against the Habsburgs, leading to a rivalry between French and Spanish troops about the strategic cities and fortresses of the Electorate. In 1630, the city of Trier opened its gates to Spanish troops to defend its rights against the absolutist Elector. French troops captured the city in 1632 to help Sötern. In return, they were allowed to install garrisons there and in the fortress of Ehrenbreitstein. Spanish troops retook Trier by surprise in 1635 and imprisoned Sötern. During his absence, the cathedral chapter took over administration of the archbishopric. Imperial troops dispelled the French garrison of Ehrenbreitstein in 1637 and occupied the place until the end of the war. The archbishop was released from captivity in 1645 because of French demands in Westphalia.

Warfare returned to the Electorate in 1673 during the Franco-Dutch War, when the French Army occupied Trier and stayed until 1675. They heavily fortified the city and destroyed all churches, abbeys and settlements in front of the city walls.

In 1684, with the War of the Reunions, an era of French expansion began. Trier was again captured in 1684; all walls and fortresses were destroyed this time. After Trier and its associated electorate were yet again taken during the War of Palatinate Succession in 1688, many cities in the electorate were systematically destroyed in 1689 by the French Army. Nearly all castles were blown up and the only bridge across the Moselle in Trier was burnt. King Louis XIV of France personally issued the order for these acts of destruction. As the French Army retreated in 1698, it left a starving city without walls and only 2,500 inhabitants.

During the War of the Spanish Succession in 1702, Trier was occupied again by a French army. In 1704–05, an allied Anglo-Dutch army commanded by the Duke of Marlborough passed Trier on its way to France. When the campaign failed, the French came back to Trier in 1705 and stayed until 1714. After a short period of peace, the War of the Polish Succession started in 1734; the following year Trier was again occupied by the French, who stayed until 1737. The last Prince-Elector, Clement Wenceslaus of Saxony, relocated to Koblenz in 1786. In August 1794, French Republican troops took Trier. This date marked the end of the era of the old electorate. Churches, abbeys and clerical possessions were sold or the buildings put to secular use, such as stables.

The last elector, Clemens Wenceslaus, resided exclusively in Koblenz after 1786. From 1795, the territories of the Electorate on the left bank of the Rhine were under French occupation; in 1801, they were annexed and a separate French-controlled diocese established under Bishop Charles Mannay. In 1803, the French diocese assumed control of the whole diocese and what was left of the electoral territory on the eastern bank of the Rhine was secularized and annexed by Nassau-Weilburg in 1803.

== Residential Landscape ==
The original seat of the Electors of Trier was the Electoral Palace in Trier. In addition, a number of castles across the electorate were used as secondary residences, particularly for summer stays and hunting, including Montabaur Castle, the Genovevaburg in Mayen, and Burg Ottenstein in Wittlich.

At the beginning of the 17th century, the centre of government gradually shifted to Koblenz, partly in response to the repeated military threats faced by Trier, especially from France. At the foot of the Ehrenbreitstein Fortress, Elector Philipp von Sötern initiated the construction of the Philippsburg. The architect had also worked on Schloss Johannisburg in Aschaffenburg for the Electors of Mainz. The Philippsburg subsequently became the principal Electoral residence and was extended under later electors.

In the 1650s, Elector Karl Kaspar von der Leyen commissioned a Renaissance-style hunting lodge, Schloss Kärlich, near Koblenz. He and his successor, Johann Hugo von Orsbeck, also carried out works at the castle in Boppard. Around 1700, the castles at Montabaur and Mayen were further adapted in the Baroque style.

Francis Louis of Palatinate-Neuburg, who was also Prince-Bishop of Breslau, appears to have spent relatively more time in his Silesian residences, such as Ottmachau, than in the western part of Germany.

During the 18th century, building activity increased. Franz Georg von Schönborn extended the Philippsburg with the dicasterial building, basis a design by Balthasar Neumann. He also initiated the Baroque rebuilding of Prüm Abbey, which could be used as a summer residence, and renovated the interiors of Montabaur Castle. In addition, he commissioned Neumann to design a new summer palace near Koblenz, Schloss Schönbornslust, completed with the assistance of Neumann’s pupil Johannes Seiz. This project represents one of the last major palace designs associated with Neumann.

His successor, Johann Philipp von Walderdorff, continued these developments. He commissioned Johannes Seiz to rebuild the Electoral Palace in Trier and to construct Schloss Engers on the Rhine as a summer residence. The medieval castle at Wittlich was replaced by a Rococo palace, Schloss Philippsfreude. Walderdorff also began rebuilding his family seat, Schloss Molsberg, although only a single wing of the original plan was completed.

The last Elector, Clemens Wenceslaus of Saxony, decided to replace the Philippsburg with a new residence in Koblenz, the Electoral Palace, built in a neoclassical style. This building ranks among the final grand princely residences constructed within the Holy Roman Empire - Another being the Rohan palace in Saverne.

In addition, several unrealised projects were conceived during this period, including plans for a new pleasure palace at Kärlich. Nevertheless, Kärlich became the site of one of the earliest English landscape gardens in continental Europe. A smaller pavilion was also erected at Bad Bertrich.

It should also be noted that several Electors simultaneously held ecclesiastical offices in other territories. Franz Georg von Schönborn and Johann Philipp von Walderdorff also served as Prince-Bishops of Worms, where Franz Georg continued the rebuilding of the Bischofshof. He was likewise involved in works at Ellwangen Castle. Clemens Wenceslaus of Saxony also held the office of Prince-Bishop of Augsburg, with residences in Augsburg, Dillingen, and Marktoberdorf.

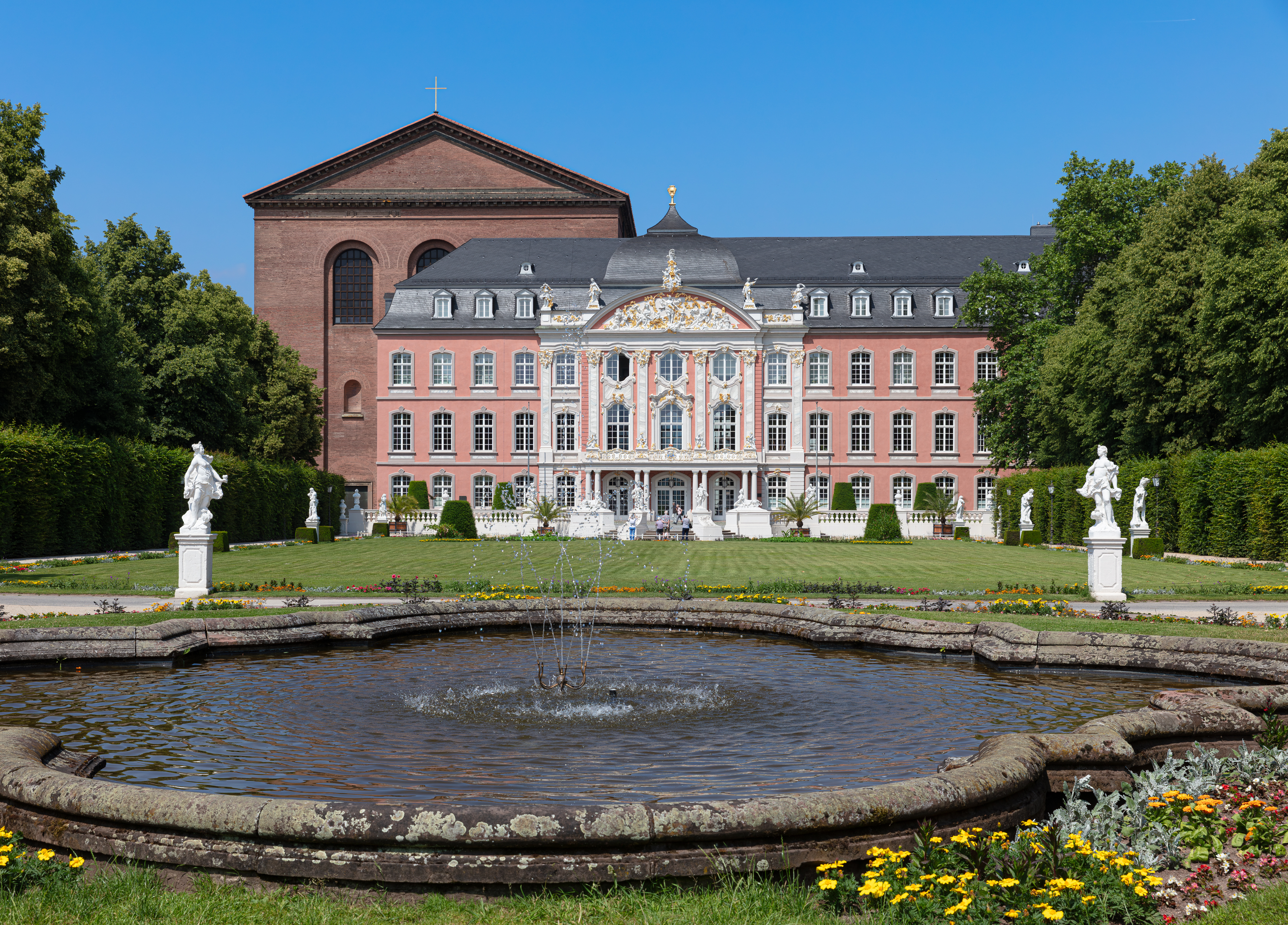
The Electoral palace in Trier

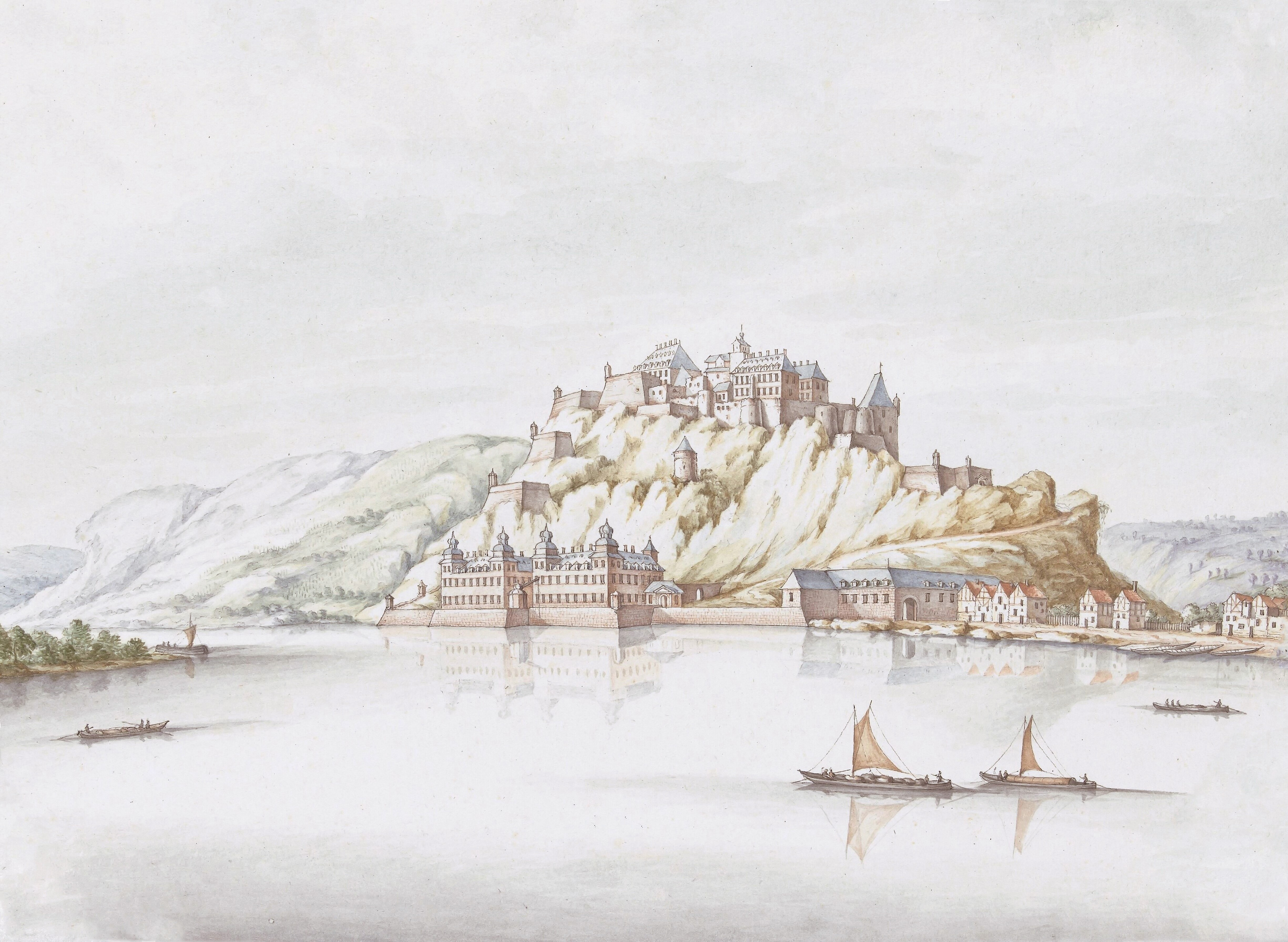
The Philippsburg in Koblenz below the Ehrenbreitstein fortress

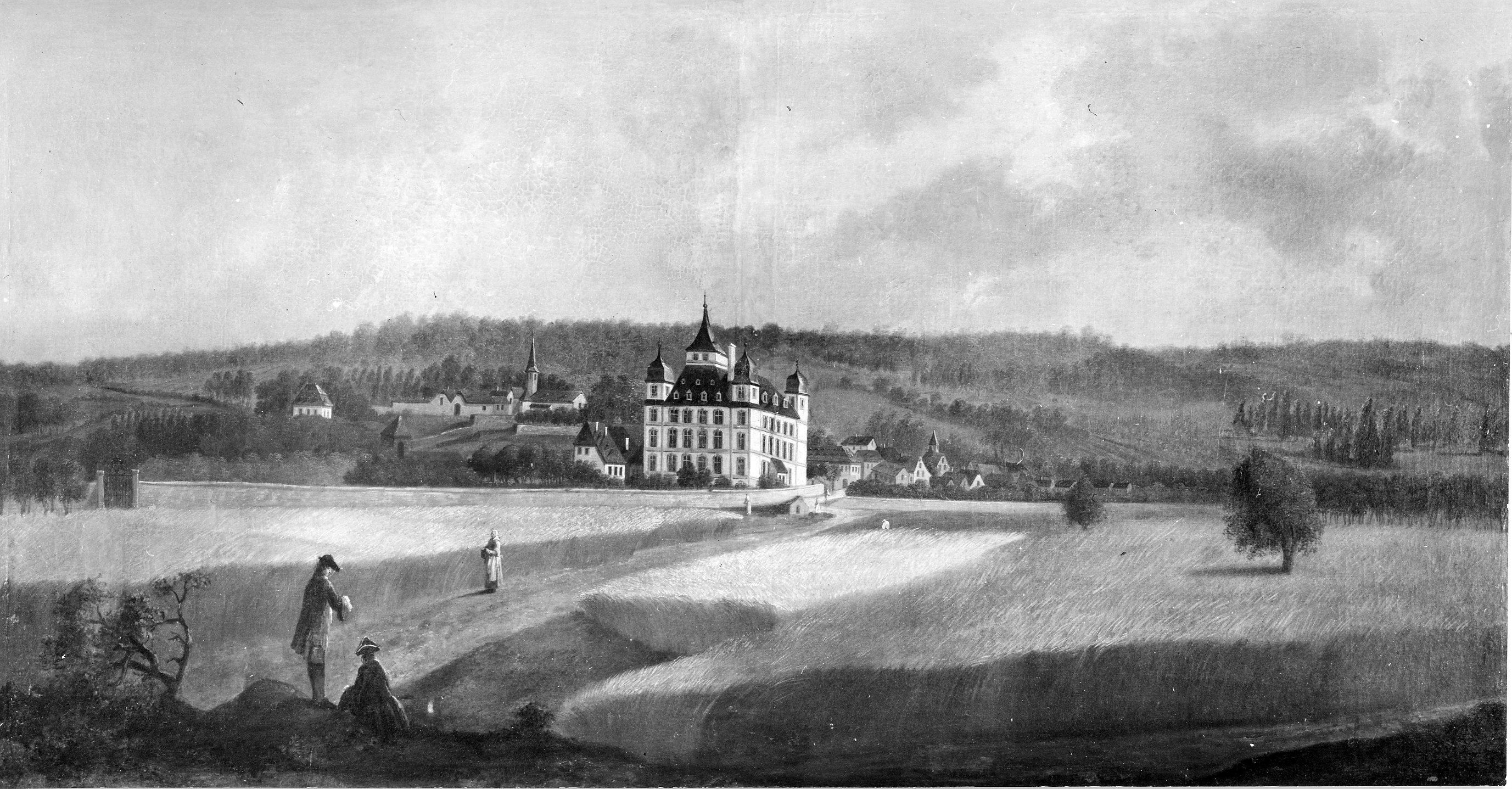
The Kärlich hunting lodge

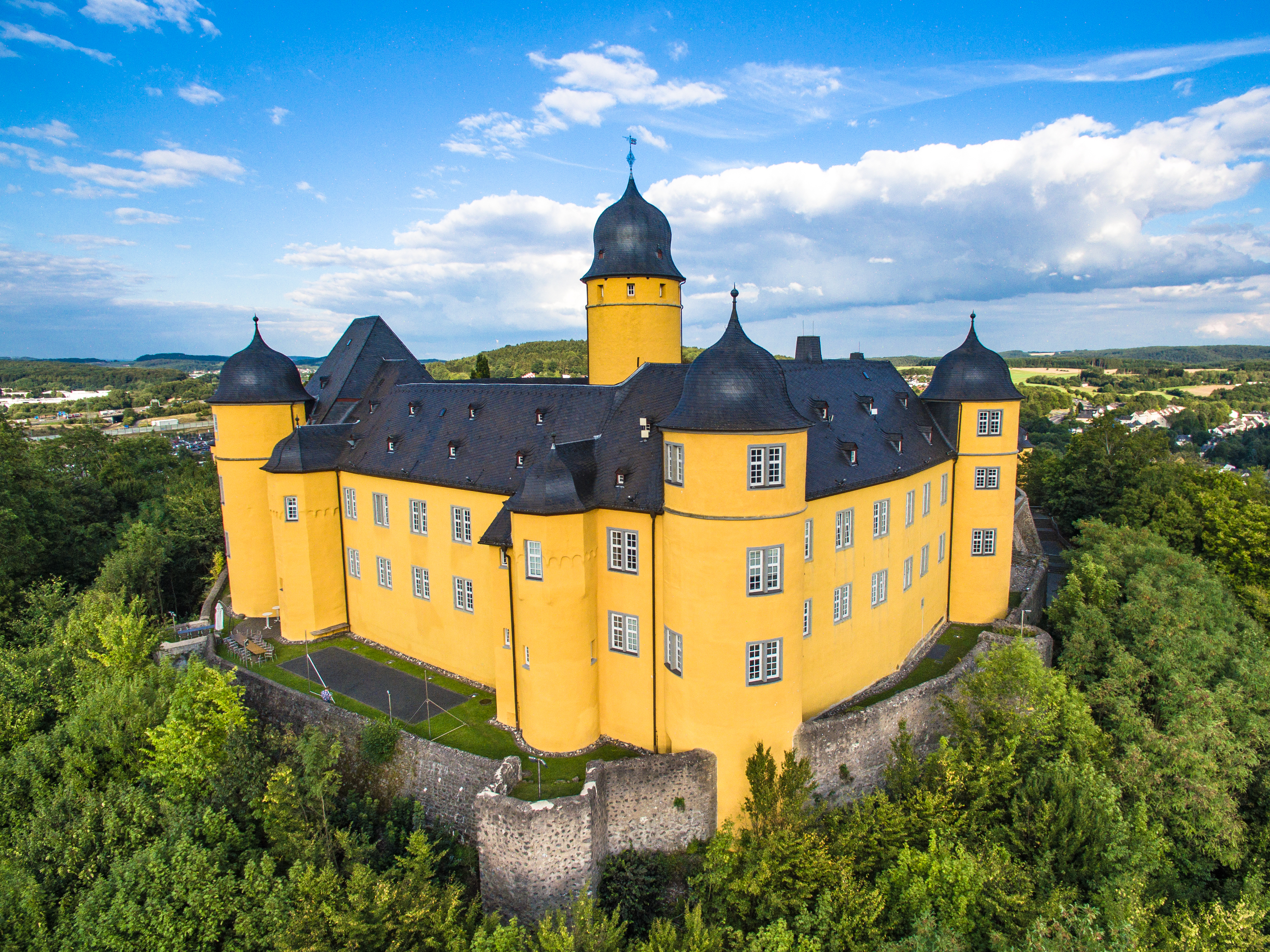
Montabaur castle

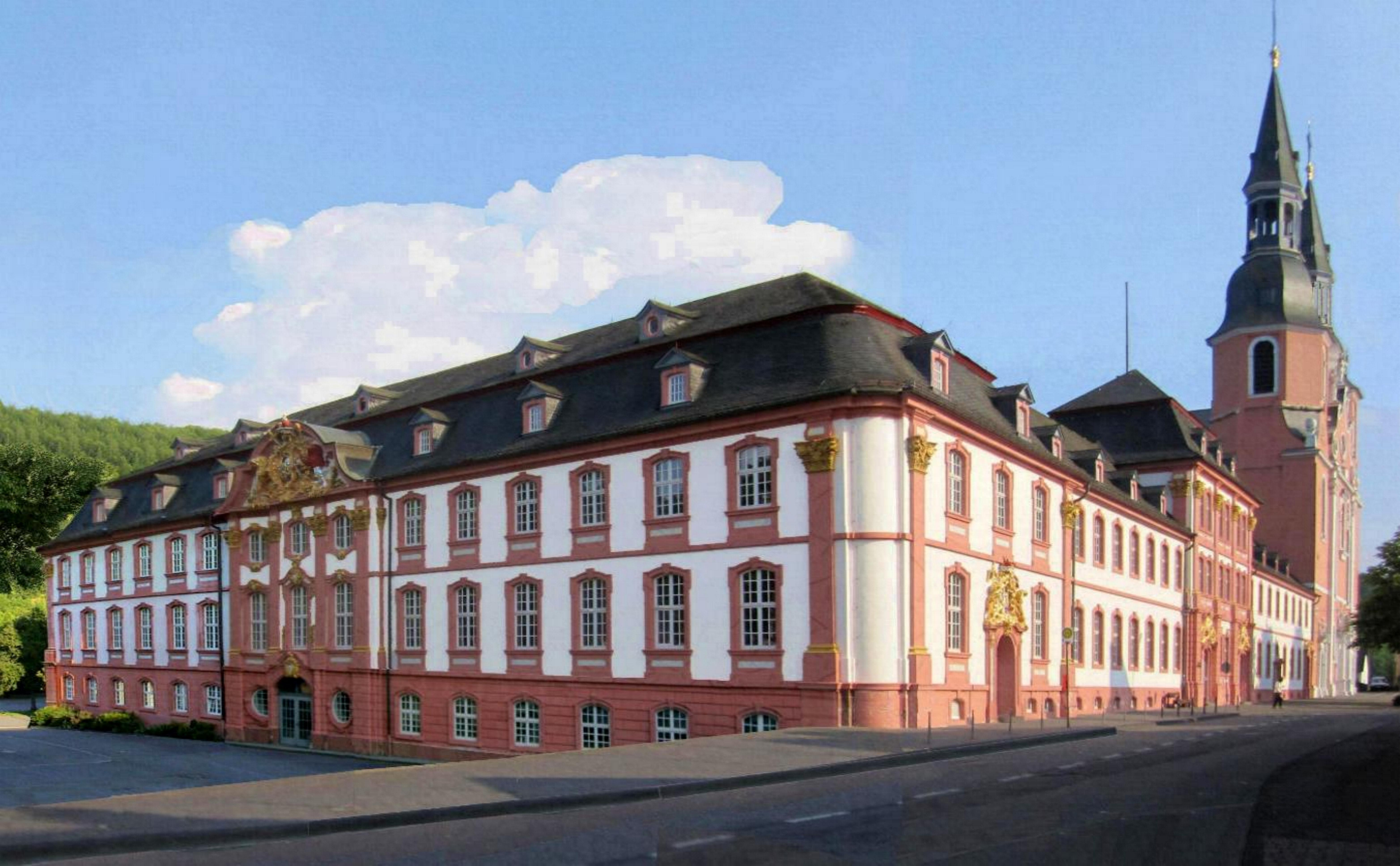
Prüm Abbey

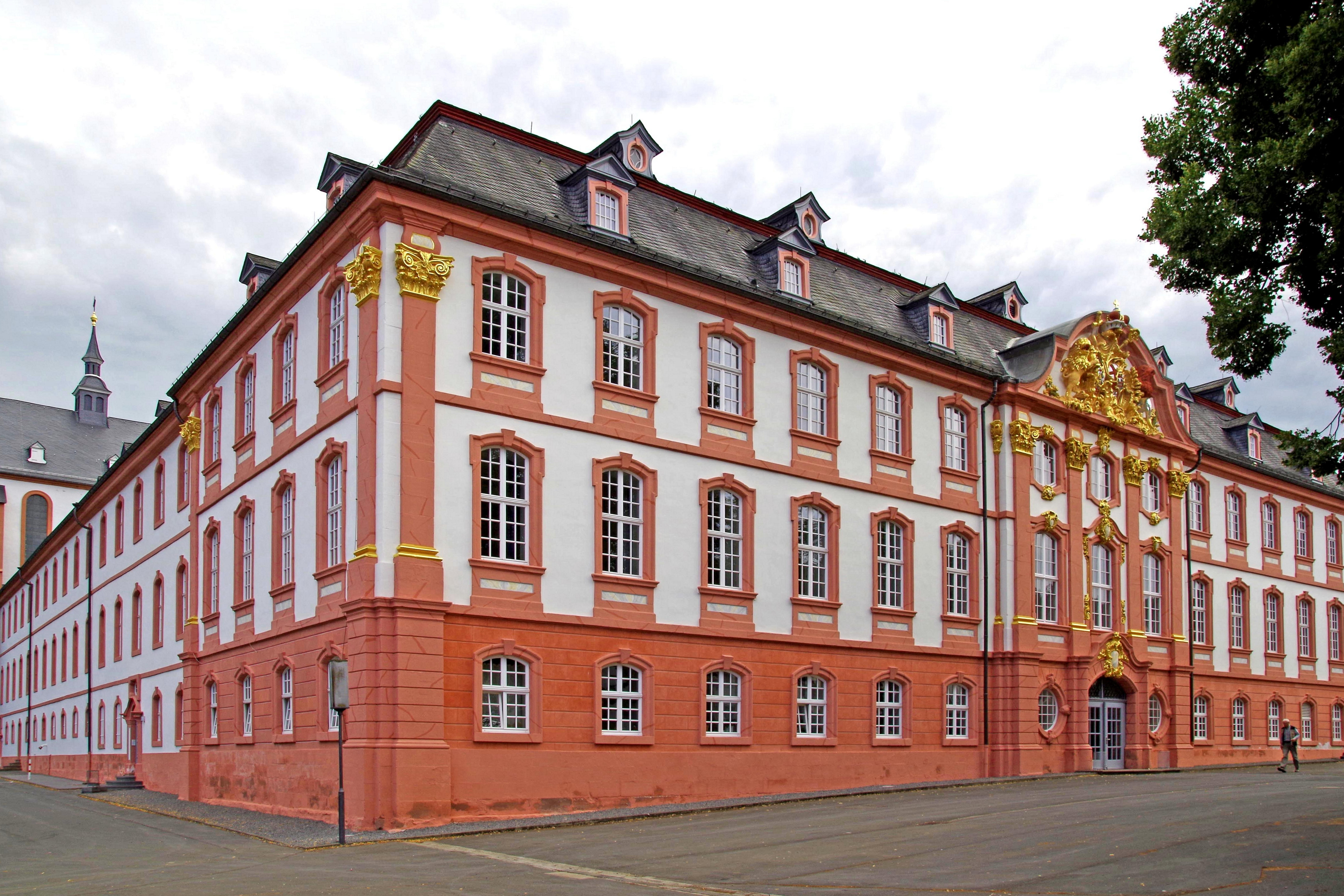
Prüm Abbey

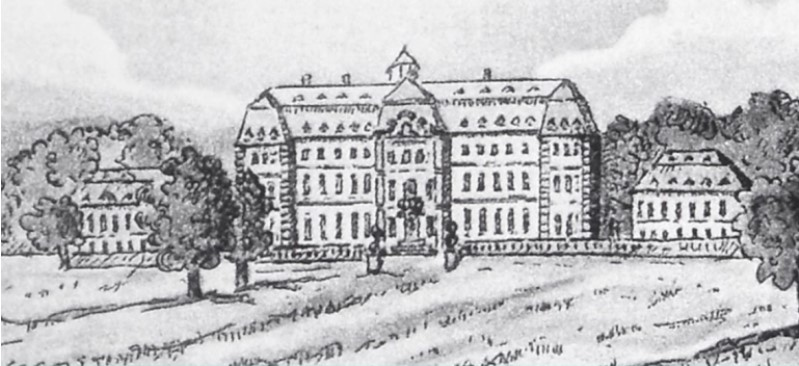
Schönbornslust, the last grand palace designed by Balthasar Neumann

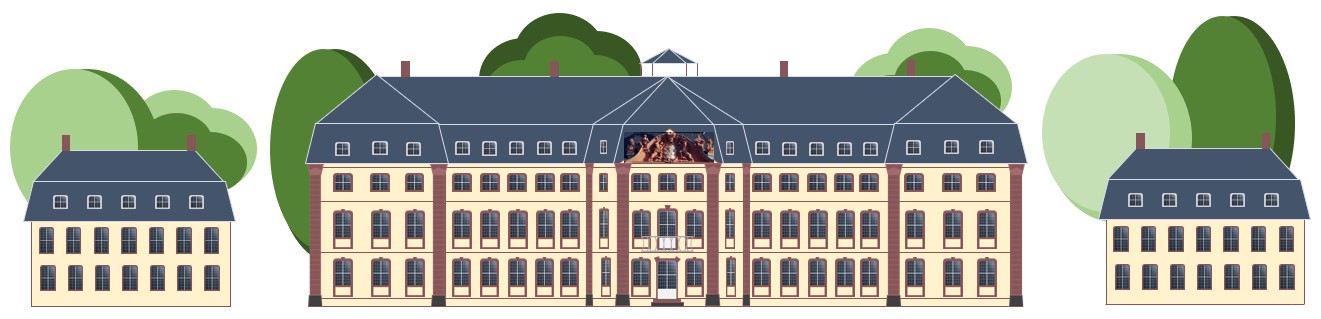
Schönbornslust

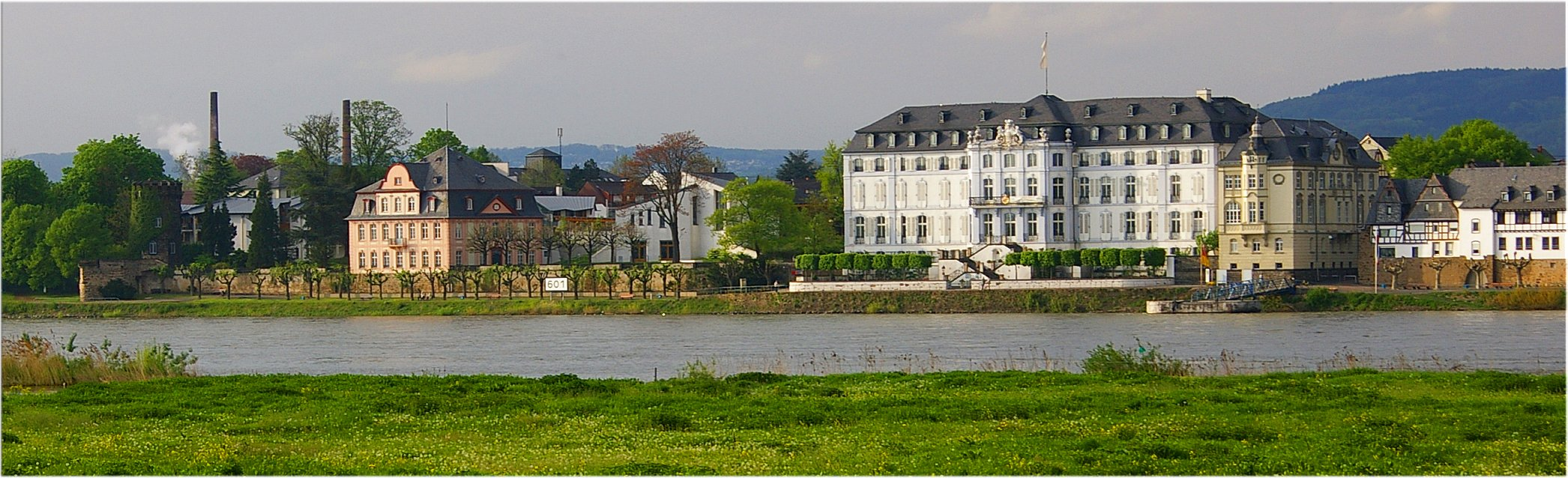
Schloss Engers on the bank of the Rhine

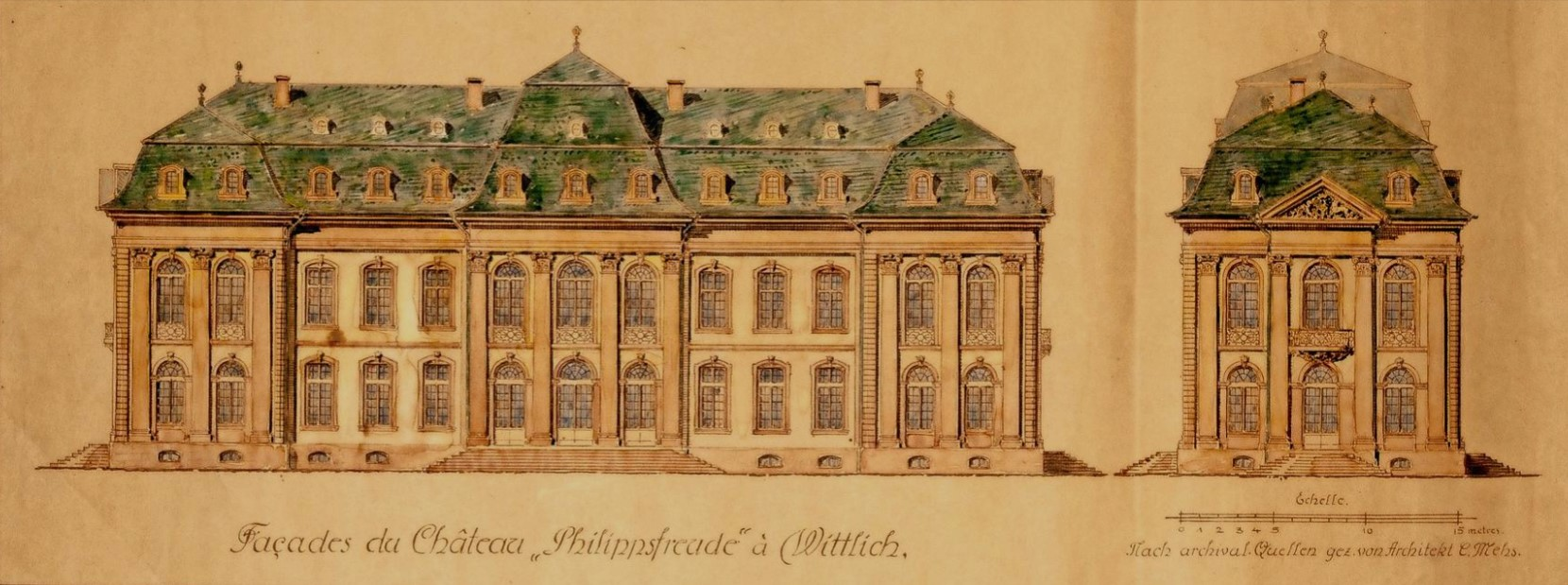
Schloss Philippsfreude in Wittlich

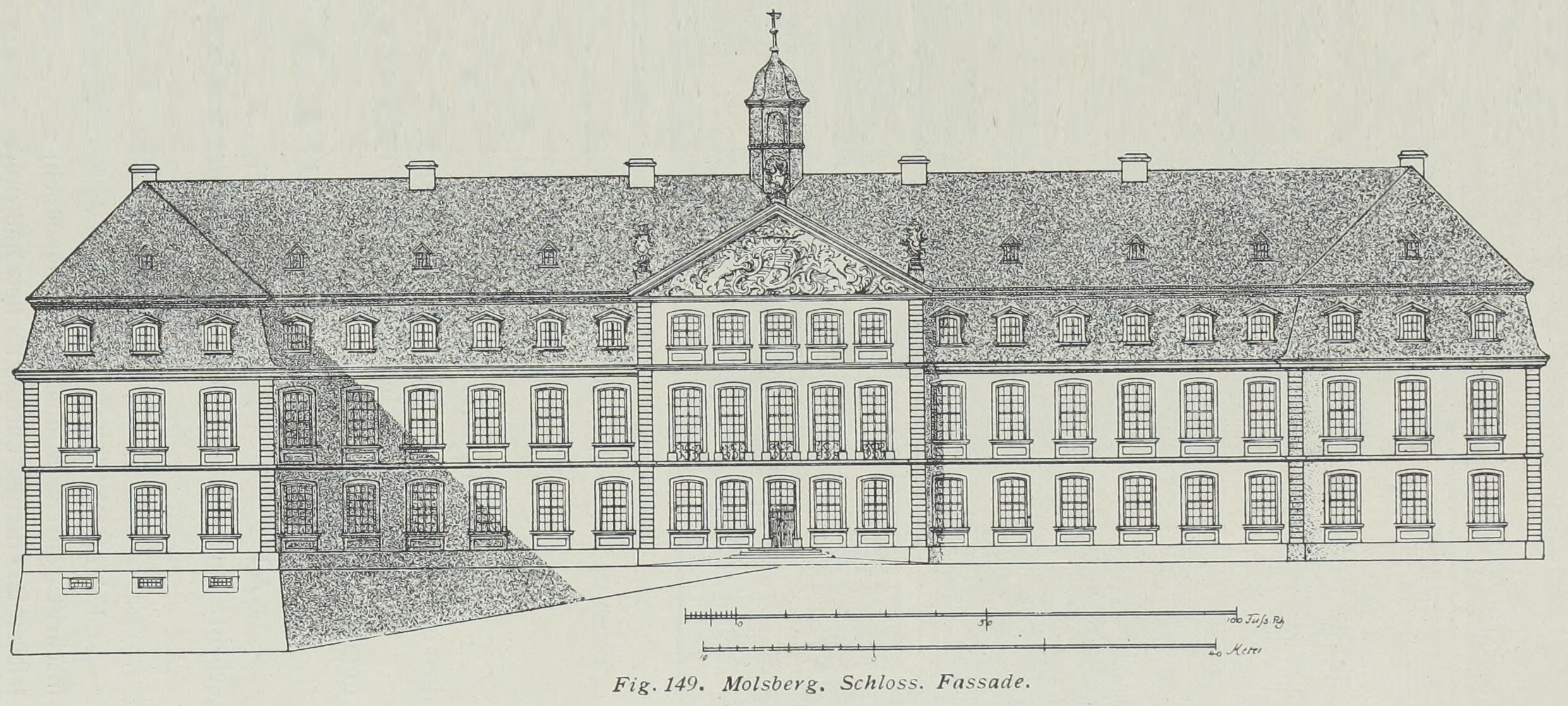
Only one wing was realized from the design for Schloss Molsberg

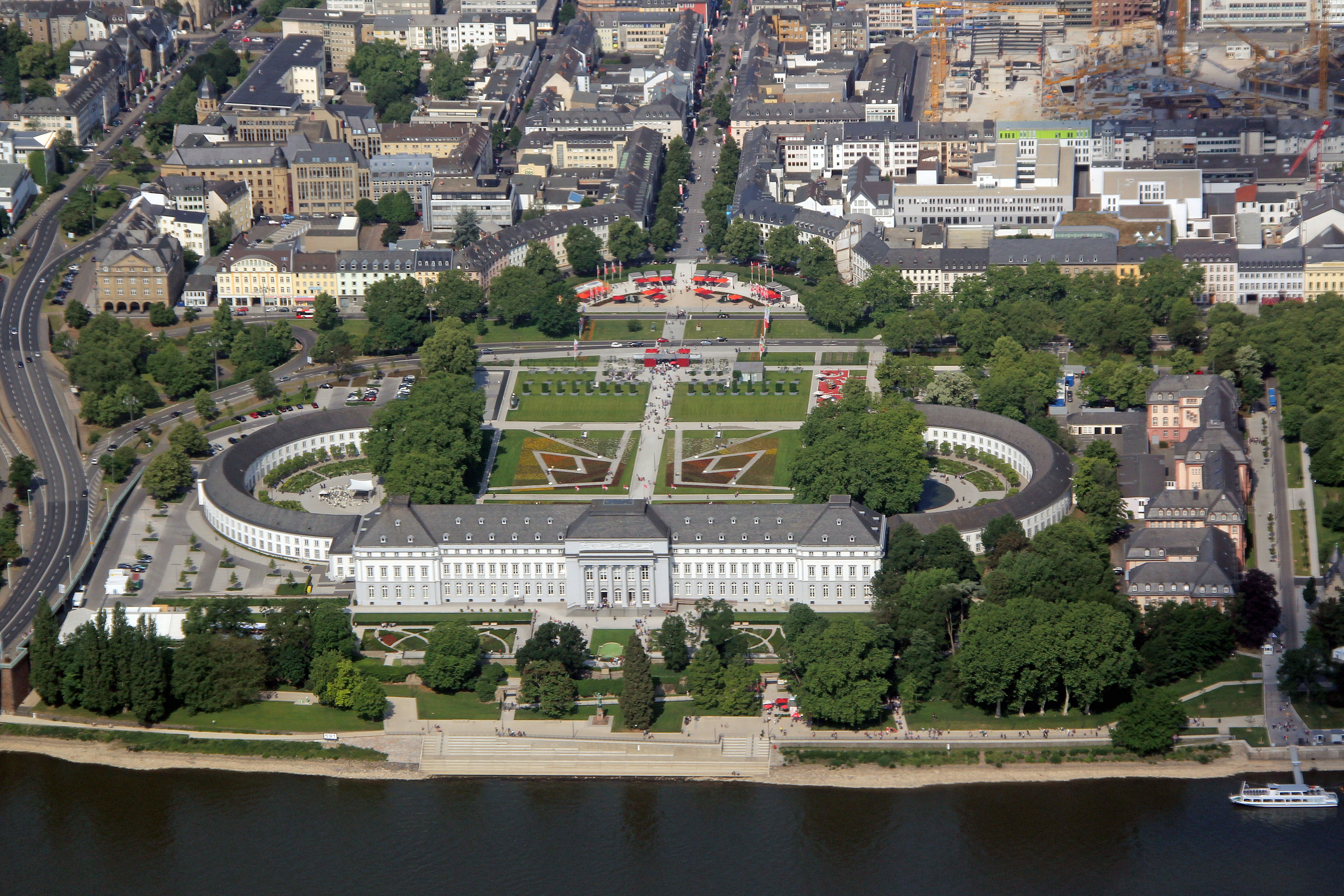
The Electoral palace in Koblenz

The Electoral pavillion in Bad Bertrich

== Archbishop-Electors of Trier ==
- John I 1189–1212
- Theoderich von Wied 1212–1242
- Arnold II von Isenburg 1242–1259
- Heinrich II von Finstingen 1260–1286
- Bohemond I von Warnesberg 1286–1299
- Diether von Nassau 1300–1307
- Heinrich II von Virneburg 1300–1306 (in opposition)
- Baldwin von Luxemburg 1307–1354
- Bohemond II von Saarbrücken 1354–1362
- Kuno II von Falkenstein 1362–1388
- Werner von Falkenstein 1388–1418
- Otto von Ziegenhain 1418–1430
- Raban von Helmstatt 1430–1438
- Jakob I von Sierck 1439–1456
- John II of Baden 1456–1503
- Jakob II von Baden 1503–1511
- Richard von Greiffenklau zu Vollrads 1511–1531
- Johann von Metzenhausen 1531–1540
- Johann Ludwig von Hagen 1540–1547
- John of Isenburg-Grenzau 1547–1556
- Johann von der Leyen 1556–1567
- Jakob von Eltz-Rübenach 1567–1581
- Johann von Schönenberg 1581–1599
- Lothar von Metternich 1599–1623
- Philipp Christoph von Sötern 1623–1652
- Karl Kaspar von der Leyen-Hohengeroldseck 1652–1676
- Johann Hugo von Orsbeck 1676–1711
- Charles Joseph of Lorraine 1711–1715
- Franz Ludwig of Palatinate-Neuburg 1716–1729
- Franz Georg von Schönborn-Buchheim 1729–1756
- Johann IX Philipp von Walderdorff 1756–1768
- Prince Clemens Wenceslaus of Saxony 1768–1803
