= Johann von Metzenhausen =

Catholic archbishop (1492–1540)

- Archbishop-Elector of Trier
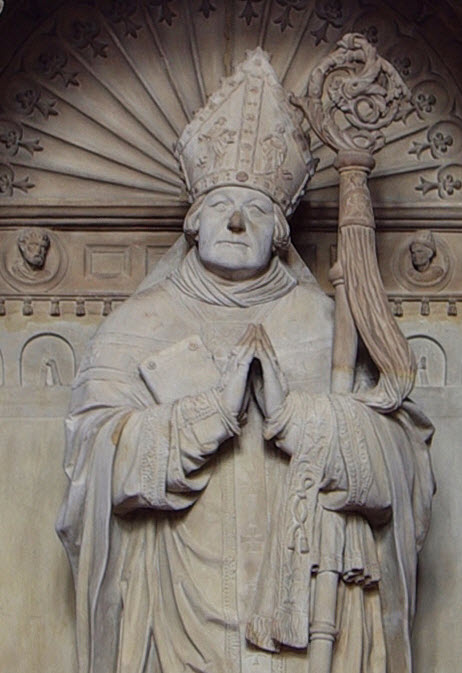
- Statue of Johann von Metzenhausen from the Cathedral of Trier.
- Church: Catholic Church
- Diocese: Electorate of Trier
- In office: 1531–1540
- Predecessor: Richard von Greiffenklau
- Successor: John IV Louis

Orders
- Ordination: 16 March 1532
- Consecration: 17 March 1532 by Nikolaus Schienen

Personal details
- Born: 1492 Neef
- Died: 22 July 1540 (aged 47–48) Thanstein Castle

Johann von Metzenhausen (1492–1540) was the Archbishop-Elector of Trier from 1531 to 1540.

== Biography ==
Johann von Metzenhausen was born in Neef in 1492, the son of Heinrich von Metzenhausen and his wife Margarete Boos von Waldeck. He became a domiciliary of the cathedral chapter of the Cathedral of Trier in 1505, and became a canon in 1511. The cathedral chapter elected him precentor in 1512; dean in 1517; and provost in 1521. In the wake of the death of Richard von Greiffenklau zu Vollrads, the cathedral chapter met on 27 March 1531 and elected Metzenhausen as the new Archbishop of Trier.

As archbishop, Metzenhausen opposed the Protestant movement, though he was generally conciliatory. He instituted reforms at the University of Trier and worked to improve the training of the clergy in the Archbishopric of Trier. With the outbreak of the Münster Rebellion in 1534, Metzenhausen helped raise troops to defeat the Anabaptist uprising. He attended the Colloquy of Haguenau in 1540, serving as one of the presidents of the colloquy.

Metzenhausen died suddenly on 22 July 1540 while visiting Thanstein Castle, near Haguenau.

== Sources ==
- Peter G. Bietenholz and Thomas Brian Deutscherp, Contemporaries of Erasmus (University of Toronto Press, 1985), Vol. 2, p. 439

John of Metzenhausen Born: 1492 in Neef Died: 22 July 1540 on Thannstein castle near Haguenau
Catholic Church titles
Regnal titles
Preceded by Richard von Greiffenklau zu Vollrads	Archbishop-Elector of Trier as John III; 1531–1540	Succeeded by John IV Louis
