= Margaret of the Palatinate =

- Duchess consort of Lorraine
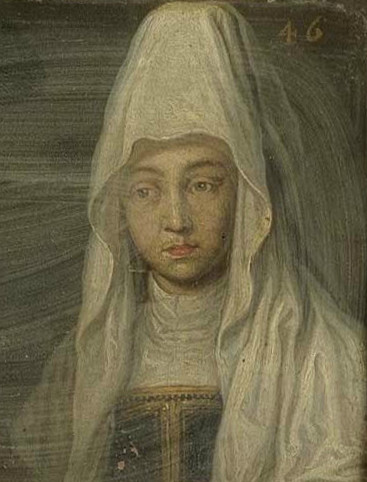
- Born: 1376
- Died: 26 August 1434 (aged 57–58); Einville-au-Jard
- Spouse: Charles II, Duke of Lorraine
- Issue: Isabella, Queen of Naples and Duchess of Lorraine; Louis; Ralph; Catherine, Margravine of Baden-Baden
- House: Wittelsbach
- Father: Rupert of Germany
- Mother: Elisabeth of Nuremberg

Margaret of the Palatinate (German: Margarete von der Pfalz; 1376 – 26 August 1434, Einville-au-Jard) was the daughter of Rupert of Germany and Elisabeth of Nuremberg. She married Charles II, Duke of Lorraine on 6 February 1393. Her maternal grandparents were Frederick V, Burgrave of Nuremberg, and Elisabeth of Meissen. One of her grandchildren was Margaret of Anjou, Queen Consort of King Henry VI of England.

== Issue ==
Her children with Charles II of Lorraine included:

- Isabella, Duchess of Lorraine (1400–1453), heiress of Lorraine and wife of René I of Naples
- Louis (died young)
- Ralph (died young)
- Catherine de Lorraine (1407–1439), wife of Jacob, Margrave of Baden

== Sources ==
- Bogdan, Henry (2007). La Lorraine des Ducs (in French). Perrin.
