= Charles I of Baden-Baden =

Margrave of Baden-Baden

Charles I
- Margrave of Baden-Baden
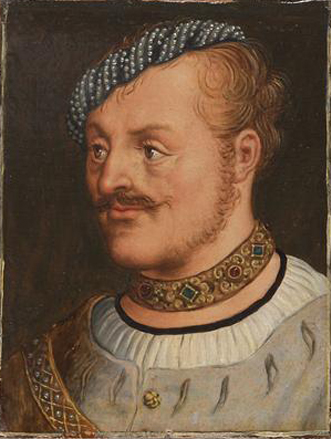
- Born: 1427
- Died: 24 February 1475 (aged 47–48)
- Noble family: House of Zähringen
- Spouse: Catherine of Austria
- Issue Detail: Katharina; Zimburg; Margareta; Christopher I of Baden; Albert, Margrave of Baden-Hachberg; Frederick
- Father: Jacob, Margrave of Baden-Baden
- Mother: Catherine of Lorraine

Charles I of Baden (1427 – 24 February 1475, Pforzheim) was a Margrave of Baden-Baden during 1454–1475.

Charles was the elder son of Jacob, Margrave of Baden-Baden, and his wife Catherine, daughter of Duke Charles II of Lorraine. In 1462 he became involved in the Bavarian War (1459–63) against Frederick I, Elector Palatine. This war finished in the same year with Charles's defeat and capture at the Battle of Seckenheim in 1462.

== Family and children ==
On 1 July 1447, Charles married Catherine of Austria (1423 – 11 September 1493), daughter of Archduke Ernest the Iron. They had:

1. Katharina (15 January 1449 – before 8 May 1484), married on 19 May 1464 to Count George III of Werdenberg-Sargans
2. Zimburg (15 May 1450 – 5 July 1501), married on 19 December 1468 to Count Engelbert II of Nassau-Dillenburg
3. Margareta (1452–1495), Abbess in Lichtenthal
4. Christopher I of Baden (13 November 1453 – 19 April 1527), married Ottilie of Katzenelnbogen
5. Albert, Margrave of Baden-Hachberg (1456–1488)
6. Frederick (9 July 1458 – 24 September 1517), Bishop of Utrecht

== Sources ==
- Hohkamp, Michaela (2007). "Sisters, Aunts, and Cousins: Familial Architectures and the Political Field in Early Modern Europe". In Sabean, David Warren; Mathieu, Jon; Teuscher, Simon (eds.). Kinship in Europe: Approaches to Long-Term Development (1300-1900). Berghahn Books.
- Lorenz, Sönke (2016). "Reuchlin and the University of Tubingen". In Plummer, Marjorie Elizabeth (ed.). Ideas and Cultural Margins in Early Modern Germany: Essays in Honor of H.C. Erik Midelfort. Translated by Head, Randolph C.; Schöntag, Hiltrud. Taylor & Francis.
- Tresp, Uwe (2010). "SeckenHeim, Battle of". In Rogers, Clifford J. (ed.). The Oxford Encyclopedia of Medieval Warfare and Military Technology. Vol. 3. Oxford University Press. pp. 244–245.

Charles I of Baden-Baden House of Zähringen Died: 24 February 1475
Preceded by Jacob	Margrave of Baden-Baden; 1454–1475	Succeeded by Christopher I

== External links and references ==
- (in German) Article in the ADB
