= John of Isenburg-Grenzau =

- Archbishop of Trier
- Church: Catholic Church
- Diocese: Electorate of Trier
- In office: 1547–1556

Personal details
- Born: c. 1507
- Died: 18 February 1556

John of Isenburg-Grenzau (German: Johann V. von Isenburg-Grenzau) (c. 1507 – 18 February 1556, in Montabaur) was the Count of Isenburg-Grenzau from 1554 until 1556, and (as John IV) the Archbishop-Elector of Trier from 1547 until 1556.

John was the second son of Count Henry the Elder. His father only had the money to educate John and his brother Salentin, and they were both sent into the church. In 1547 he was elected the Archbishop of Trier. As archbishop, John reorganised the finances of the archdiocese, and worked to improve the standards of his father's lands. In 1554 John succeeded his brother Anthony as Count of Isenburg-Grenzau.

John spent much of his time in his Westerwald residence of Montabaur, where he died in 1556.

John of Isenburg-Grenzau House of Isenburg Born: around 1507 Died: 18 February 1556 in Montabaur
Catholic Church titles
Regnal titles
Preceded by John IV	Archbishop- Elector of Trier as John V 1547–1556	Succeeded by John VI
