= Richard von Greiffenklau zu Vollrads =

Archbishop-Elector of Trier

- Archbishop-Elector of Trier
- Church: Catholic Church
- Archdiocese: Trier
- In office: 1511–1531
- Predecessor: Jakob II von Baden
- Successor: Johann III von Metzenhausen

Orders
- Ordination: 29 May 1512
- Consecration: 30 May 1512 by Uriel von Gemmingen

Personal details
- Born: 1467 Schloss Vollrads
- Died: 13 March 1531 (aged 63–64) Wittlich
- Buried: Trier Cathedral

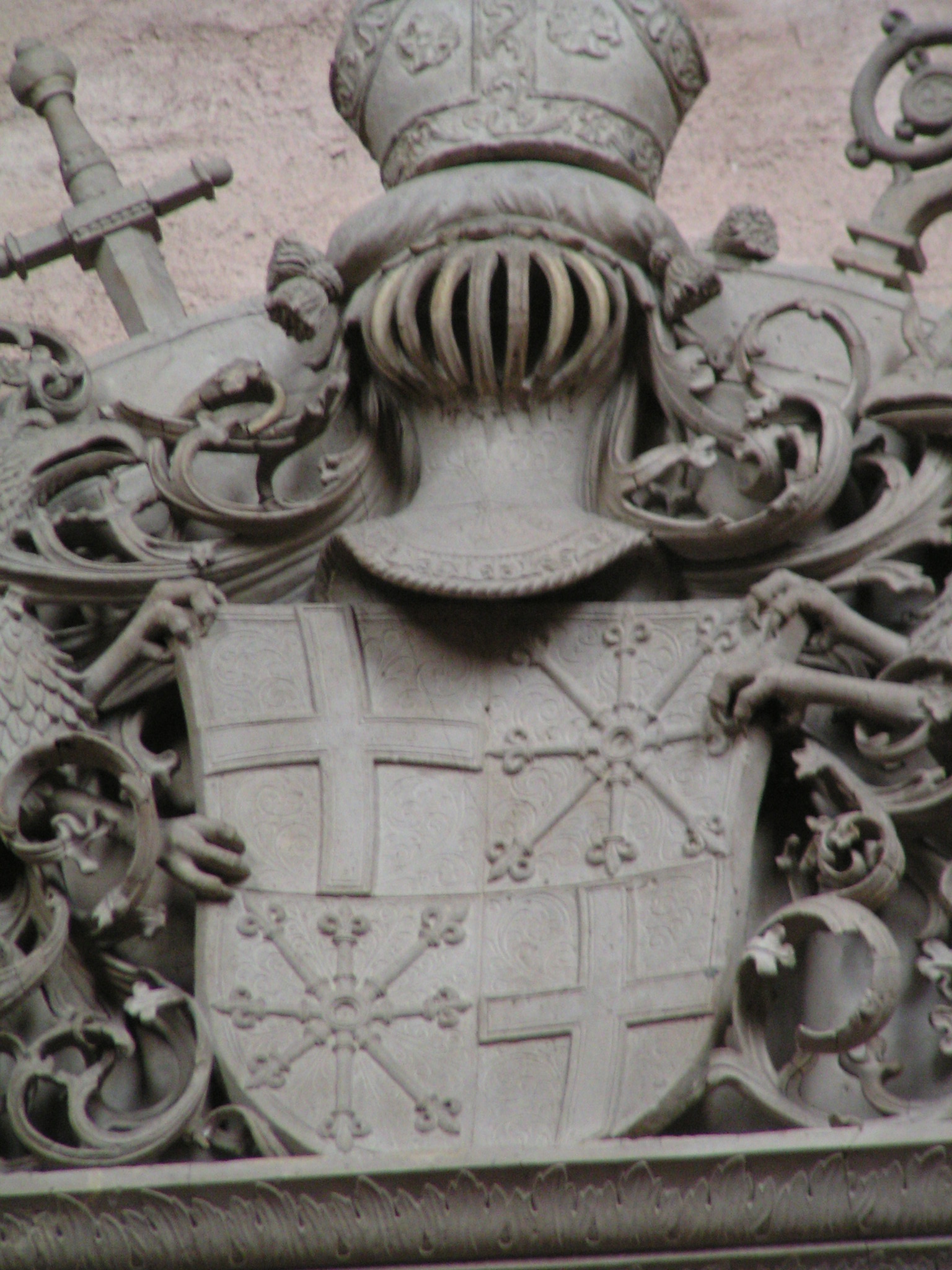
Richard's arms, from his tomb in the Cathedral of Trier.

Richard von Greiffenklau zu Vollrads (also spelled Greiffenclau and Vollraths; 1467 – 13 March 1531) was a German clergyman who served as Archbishop and Elector of Trier from 1511 until his death in 1531.

== Biography ==
Richard von Greiffenklau zu Vollrads was born in Schloss Vollrads in 1467, the son of Johann von Greiffenklau and Klara von Ratsamhausen. As the family's fourth son, Richard was groomed for a career in the church from a young age.

In 1487, he became a canon of the Cathedral of Trier. He began studies in Paris in 1488. In 1503, he was made cantor of the Cathedral of Trier and also became a canon of Mainz Cathedral.

Richard was elected Archbishop of Trier on 15 May 1511. Pope Julius II confirmed his appointment on 26 April 1512, and on 30 May 1512 Archbishop of Mainz Uriel von Gemmingen consecrated Richard as a bishop.

Only 23 days after his installation as Archbishop, Richard opened the altar that had enshrined a relic believed to be the seamless robe of Jesus since the building of the Dome in the presence of Maximilian I, Holy Roman Emperor and exhibited it.

In 1515, Richard completed judicial reforms and allowed Jews to re-enter the Electorate of Trier. During the imperial election of 1519, Richard was bribed by Francis I of France and subsequently voted for Francis, although Francis lost the election to Charles V, Holy Roman Emperor. This did not prevent Charles V from inviting Richard to the Diet of Worms in 1521 where, at Charles' behest, Richard unsuccessfully attempted to convince Martin Luther to recant the views that had resulted in Pope Leo X issuing the papal bull Exsurge Domine, which had excommunicated Luther in 1520. In 1522, during the Knights' War, Franz von Sickingen declared war on the Archbishopric of Trier but he failed in his efforts to take Trier. Richard sided with the coalition of princes that ultimately defeated the Knights' War in 1523.

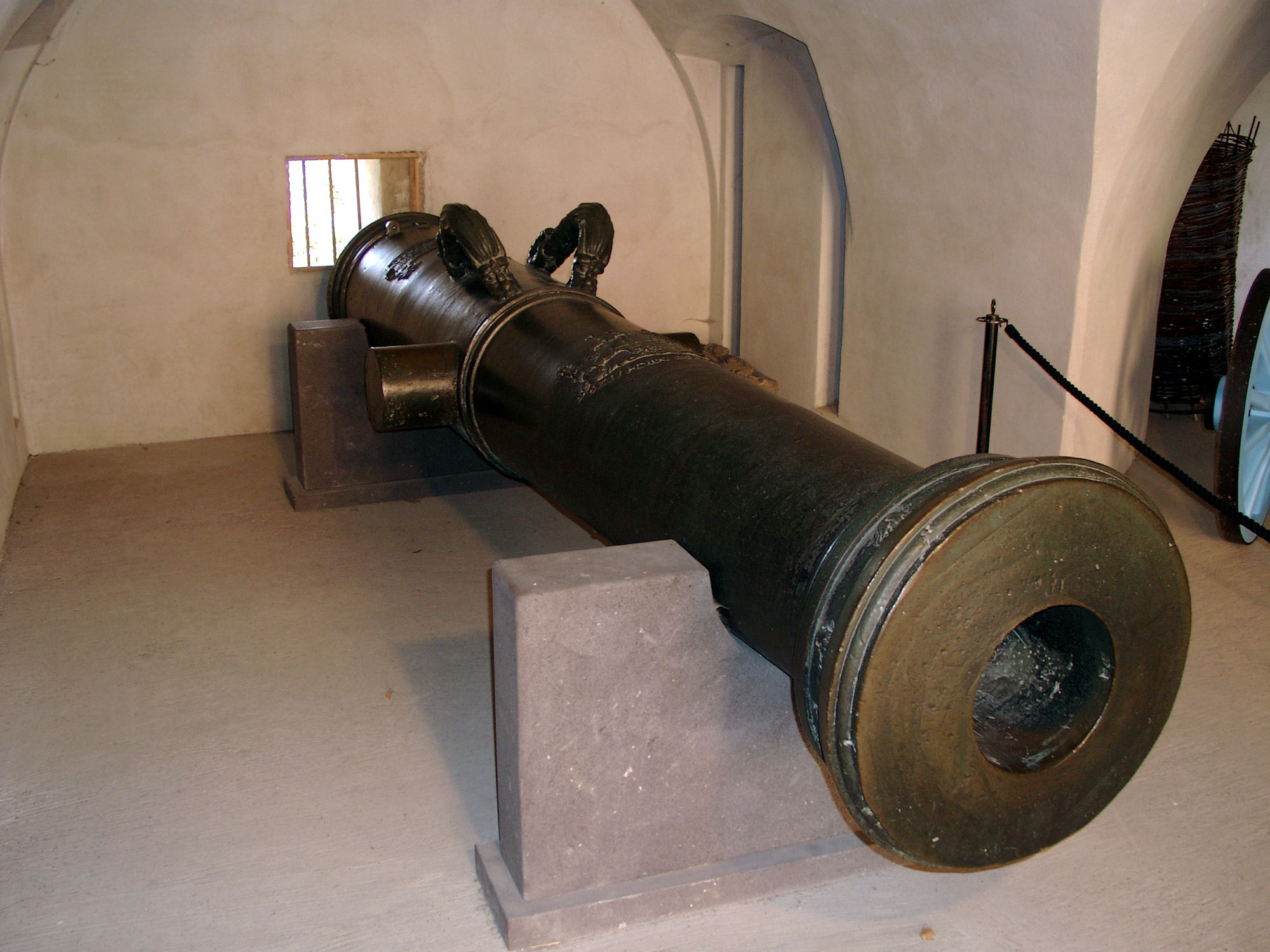
The Kanone Greif commissioned by Richard in 1524.

The next year, he commissioned additions to the Ehrenbreitstein Fortress, including the large cannon known as the Kanone Greif, the largest siege gun of its time. Richard attended the Second Diet of Speyer in 1529, but did not attend the 1530 Diet of Augsburg (probably due to illness), instead sending Johann von Metzenhausen as his representative.

Richard died at the Schloss Ottenstein in Wittlich on 13 March 1531. He is buried in the Cathedral of Trier, and has a large Renaissance funerary monument.

Richard von Greiffenklau zu Vollrads Born: 1467 Died: 13 March 1531
Catholic Church titles
Regnal titles
| Preceded by Jakob II von Baden | Archbishop-Elector of Trier; 1511–1531 | Succeeded by Johann III von Metzenhausen |
