= Johann Ludwig von Hagen =

Archbishop-Elector of Trier

- Archbishop-Elector of Trier
- Church: Catholic Church
- Archdiocese: Trier
- In office: 1540–1547

Personal details
- Born: 1492
- Died: 23 March 1547 (aged 54–55)

Johann Ludwig von Hagen (1492 – 23 March 1547) was a German clergyman who served as Archbishop and Elector of Trier from 1540 until his death in 1547.

== Biography ==
Johann Ludwig von Hagen was born in Pfalzel near Trier in 1492, the son of Friedrich von Hagen, Amtmann of the Archbishopric of Trier. He studied in Paris and Cologne and then held various ecclesiastical positions in the Archbishopric of Trier.

On 9 August 1540 the cathedral chapter of the Cathedral of Trier elected Johann Ludwig von Hagen as the new Archbishop of Trier. Pope Paul III confirmed the appointment on 10 December 1540. During his time as archbishop, he attended regularly to his ecclesiastical duties and opposed the Protestant Reformation. During the Schmalkaldic War, large areas of the Archbishopric of Trier were devastated by armies, especially Koblenz and the surrounding area.

Johann Ludwig von Hagen died in Ehrenbreitstein on 23 March 1547. He is buried in the Cathedral of Trier. His tomb was destroyed in 1804.

Johann Ludwig von Hagen Born: 1492 Died: 23 March 1547
Catholic Church titles
Regnal titles
Preceded by Johann III	Archbishop-Elector of Trier as Johann IV; 1540–1547	Succeeded by John of Isenburg-Grenzau
