= John II of Baden =

Margrave of Baden

- Coat-of-arms of Baden
- Born: 1434; Hohenbaden Castle in Baden-Baden
- Died: 9 February 1503; Ehrenbreitstein, now part of Koblenz
- Buried: Cathedral of Trier
- Noble family: House of Zähringen
- Father: Jacob, Margrave of Baden-Baden
- Mother: Catherine de Lorraine

John II of Baden (1434 at Hohenbaden Castle in Baden-Baden – 9 February 1503 in Ehrenbreitstein) was a titular Margrave of Baden and was Archbishop and Elector of Trier as John II of Baden from 1456 until his death in 1503.

John II of Baden was the third son of Margrave Jacob I of Baden-Baden and his wife Catherine de Lorraine. John was given a strict religious upbringing, as he was destined from an early age for an ecclesiastical career. At the urging of his father, most of his siblings also followed a religious career, the exceptions being his two oldest brothers Charles I and Bernard II and his sister Margaret. He studied in Erfurt, Pavia and Cologne from 1452 to 1456, together with his younger brothers George and Mark.

On 21 June 1456, at the age of 22, he was elected Archbishop of Trier as John II of Baden. His mother was from Lorraine and had connections with Trier. Pope Calixtus III confirmed him as administrator of Trier, because he had not yet reached the minimum age of 35 for consecration as bishop. When he reached that age in 1465, he was consecrated by his suffragan bishop Hubertis Agrippina and the bishops of Metz and Worms.

In 1459, Diether von Isenburg was elected Archbishop of Mainz, ahead of Adolph II of Nassau by a narrow margin. However, the Pope did not confirm Dieter's election. This led to the Baden-Palatinate War, in which John II and his brothers participated on the side of Adolph II of Nassau.

John II of Baden supported reform in the Benedictine monasteries and encouraged them to join the Bursfelde Congregation. In 1469, he sent Johann Fart, the prior of the St. Mary monastery in Trier to the Maria Laach Abbey, where Johann acted as a reformer abbot. Johann was the 21st abbott, his tenure lasted from 1470 to 1491. By appointing Johann, John II thwarted the intentions of Archbishop Rupert of Cologne, who had a different reform candidate in mind.

During John II's reign, the long-anticipated University of Trier was founded on 16 March 1473. The University provided coursed in theology, philosophy, medicine and law. In 1477, he officiated in the wedding of Maximilian of Habsburg and Mary of Burgundy.

In 1488, John II of Baden waged a feud against Cuno III von Winneburg and Beilstein and in 1497 he had 12,000 men besiege the city of Boppard, which was trying to regain its imperial freedom.

On 16 January 1500, he appointed his great-nephew Jakob as co-adjutor with the right to succeed (Latin: coadiutor cum iure successionis) and from 1501, Jakob led the government of the Electorate.

John II died in 1503 in Ehrenbreitstein (now part of Koblenz), after a tenure of 46 years, 7 months and 18 days, the longest of any bishop of Trier. He was buried in the Cathedral of Trier in a magnificent grave that he had built during his lifetime.

John II of Baden House of Zähringen Born: 1434 Died: 9 February 1503
Preceded by Jakob I von Sierck	Elector and Archbishop of Trier; 1456-1503	Succeeded by Jakob von Baden
