= Johann von der Leyen =

Archbishop-Elector of Trier

- Archbishop-Elector of Trier
- Church: Catholic Church
- Archdiocese: Trier
- In office: 1556–1567

Personal details
- Born: c. 1510
- Died: 10 February 1567 (aged 56–57) Koblenz

Johann von der Leyen (c. 1510 – 10 February 1567) was a German clergyman who served as Archbishop and Elector of Trier from 1556 until his death in 1567.

== Biography ==
Johann von der Leyen was born around 1510, the son of Bartholomäus von der Leyen (died 1540), chancellor of the Archbishopric of Cologne, and his wife Katharina von Pallandt. He became Domizellar of the Cathedral of Trier in 1528, during which time he studied at the University of Leuven. In 1532, he became a canon of the Cathedral of Trier. Additional canonicates at Würzburg Cathedral and at Münster Cathedral allowed him to continue his studies at the University of Paris, the University of Freiburg, the University of Orléans, and the University of Padua. He became chaplain of the Cathedral of Trier in 1535 and then Archdeacon in 1548. (Archdeacon is the highest clerical rank attained by Johann von der Leyen and he was never ordained as a priest or bishop.)

When Archbishop of Trier John of Isenburg-Grenzau fell ill, the cathedral chapter of the Cathedral of Trier elected Johann von der Leyen as coadjutor archbishop on 22 October 1555. He became archbishop upon the death of his predecessor on 13 February 1556. He was enthroned as archbishop on 25 April 1556.

Johann von der Leyen was a proponent of the reservatum ecclesiasticum provisions of the Peace of Augsburg. He opposed the efforts of Kaspar Olevianus to bring the Reformation to the Archbishopric of Trier. In 1560, he encouraged the Jesuits to take control of the philosophy and theology faculties of the University of Trier. He oversaw the establishment of a Jesuit gymnasium in 1562.

He died in Koblenz on 10 February 1567. He was buried in Koblenz in the church dedicated to Florinus of Remüs. After his grave was desecrated by occupying French forces, in 1808, he was reburied in the Basilica of St. Castor.

Johann von der Leyen House of Leyen Born: c. 1510 Died: 10 February 1567
Catholic Church titles
Regnal titles
Preceded by John of Isenburg-Grenzau	Archbishop-Elector of Trier as Johann VI; 1556–1567	Succeeded by Jakob von Eltz-Rübenach
