= Moyen =

- Commune
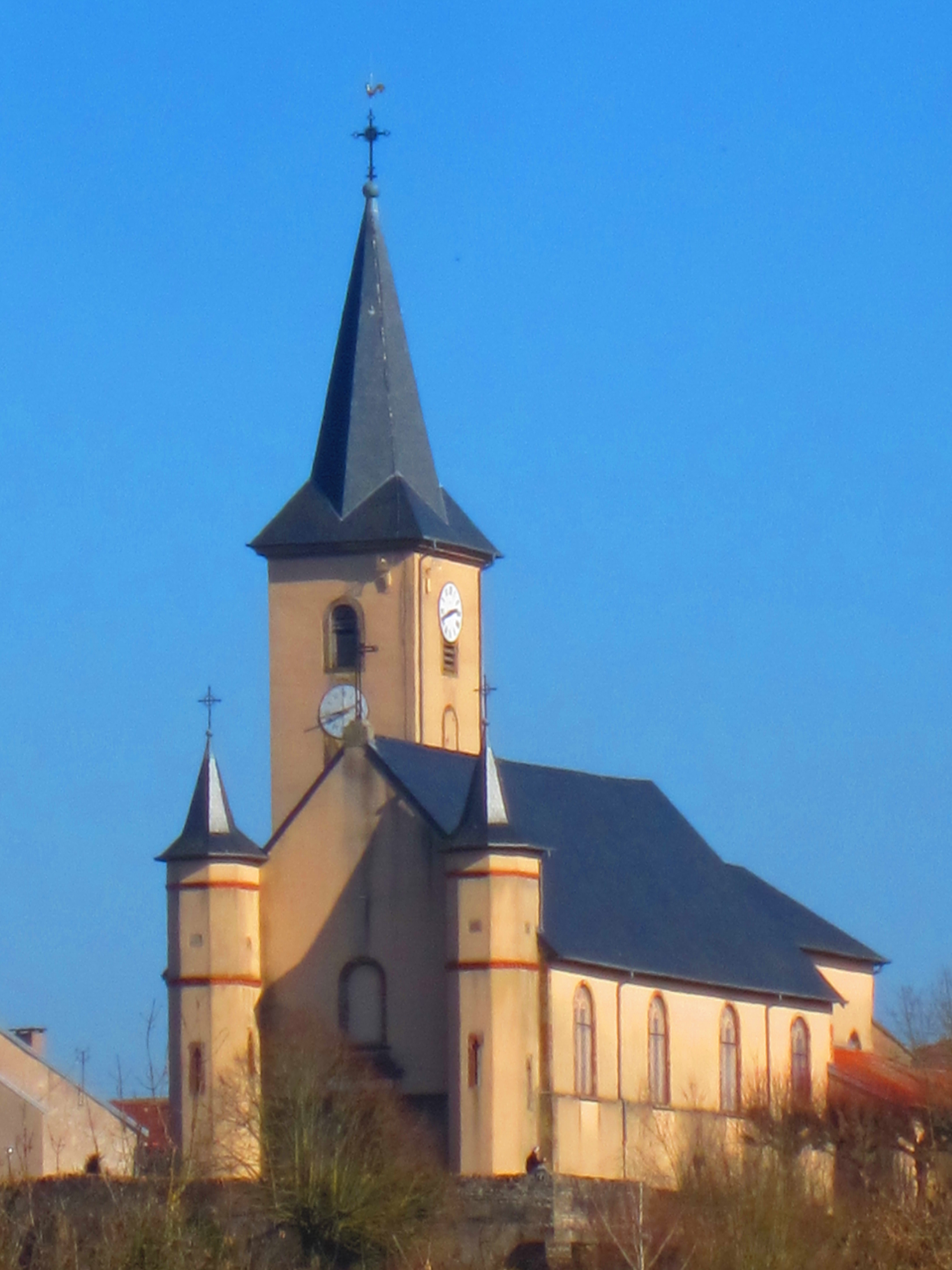
- The church in Moyen

- Coat of arms
- Location of Moyen
- Location within France Location within Grand Est
- Coordinates: 48°29′04″N 6°34′11″E
- Country: France
- Region: Grand Est
- Department: Meurthe-et-Moselle
- Arrondissement: Lunéville
- Canton: Lunéville-2
- Intercommunality: Territoire de Lunéville à Baccarat

Government
  - Mayor (2020–2026): Ludivine Géant
- Area^{1}: 23.57 km^{2} (9.10 sq mi)
- Elevation: 250 m (820 ft)
- Highest elevation: 347 m (1,138 ft)
- Lowest elevation: 236 m (774 ft)
- Population (2023): 517
  - Density: 21.9/km^{2} (56.8/sq mi)
- Time zone: UTC+01:00 (CET)
  - Summer (DST): UTC+02:00 (CEST)
- INSEE/Postal code: 54393 /54118
- ^{1} French Land Register data, which excludes lakes, ponds, glaciers > 1 km^{2} (0.386 sq mi or 247 acres) and river estuaries.

Moyen (French pronunciation: [mwajɛ̃]) is a village and commune in the Meurthe-et-Moselle département of north-eastern France.

== Geography ==
The river Mortagne forms most of the commune's south-western border.

== See also ==
- Communes of the Meurthe-et-Moselle department
