= Charles II of Lorraine =

Duke of Lorraine from 1390 to 1431

Charles II "the Bold"
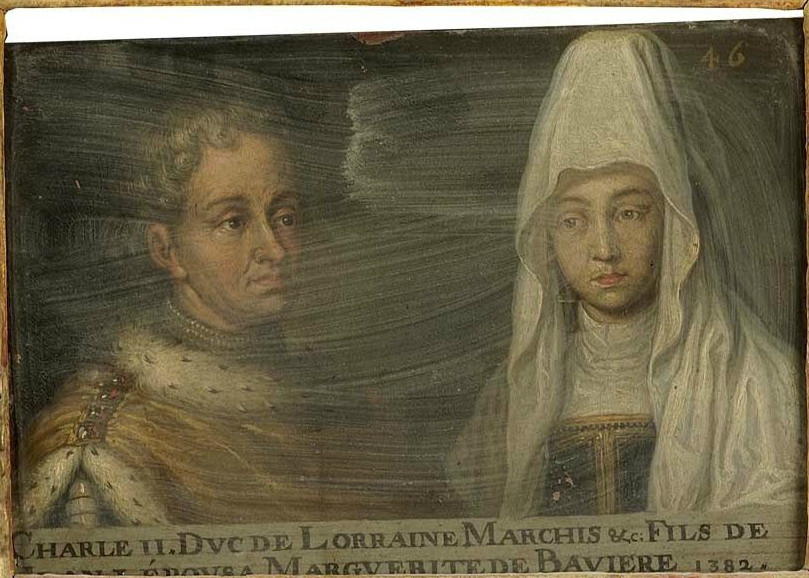
- Charles and his wife Margaret

Duke of Lorraine
- Reign: 27 September 1390 - 25 January 1431
- Predecessor: John I
- Successor: Isabella and René I
- Born: 11 September 1365
- Died: 25 January 1431 (aged 66); Nancy
- Spouse: Margaret of the Palatinate
- Issue Detail: Isabella, Queen of Naples and Duchess of Lorraine; Catherine, Margravine of Baden-Baden
- House: Ardennes-Metz
- Father: John I, Duke of Lorraine
- Mother: Sophie of Württemberg

Charles II (11 September 1365 – 25 January 1431), called the Bold (French: le Hardi), was the Duke of Lorraine from 1390 to his death and Constable of France from 1418 to 1425.

Charles joined the Barbary Crusade, fought at Nicopolis, and aided the Teutonic knights in Livonia. During the Hundred Years' War, he sought closer ties to the French royal family, even being made Constable by Queen Isabeau. Following an indecisive war against his nephew, he died in 1431.

== Biography ==
Born 11 September 1365, (Note: Henry Bogdan, Regine Pernoud and Marie-Veronique Clin indicate Charles was born in 1365) Charles was the elder son of John I, Duke of Lorraine, and Sophie, daughter of Eberhard II, Count of Württemberg. During his youth, he had been close to Philip II, Duke of Burgundy, and they were comrades in arms on several occasions. This proximity to Burgundy was largely a result of his father's moving away from the French court, the court to which the Lorrainer dukes had neared in the past century and a half as they withdrew from the Holy Roman Empire, within which their duchy was still technically a vassal state. Charles was defiant of Louis I, Duke of Orléans, who had supported the citizens of Neufchâteau against his father and the Wenceslaus, King of the Romans when the latter was accused by his subjects of weakness. Wenceslaus was deposed in 1400 and replaced by Rupert III, Count Palatine of the Rhine, Charles's father-in-law.

Charles was also a major participant in some late Crusading movements. He joined the Barbary Crusade led by Louis II, Duke of Bourbon in 1390 and was at the disastrous Battle of Nicopolis in 1396. There he accompanied John the Fearless, the Count of Nevers and son of his friend Philip. In 1399, he assisted the Teutonic Knights in Livonia.

== Hundred Years' War ==
France broke down into two parties: the Armagnacs of Bernard VII, Count of Armagnac, the tutor of the young Charles I, Duke of Orléans, and the Burgundians of John the Fearless, Philip's successor as Duke of Burgundy, who was supported by Charles of Lorraine. Charles did not, however, enter the Anglo-French conflict then raging—the Hundred Years' War—but his brother, Frederick I, Count of Vaudémont, got involved and died in the Battle of Agincourt in 1415. Nevertheless, the queen, Isabeau of Bavaria, appointed Charles Constable in 1418. In 1425, he asserted that the load was too large for him and renounced it.

Charles adopted a new stance vis-à-vis France after the assassination of John the Fearless in 1419. John's successor, Philip III, had much territory in the Low Countries and only Lorraine and Champagne separated his Burgundian from his Belgian possessions. Fearing any warlike ambitions, Charles thought it prudent to reorient his fidelities and friendships away from such a possible adversary. Through his French connections, he obtained the assistance of King Charles VII against Burgundy and married his daughter to the Angevin René, later king of Naples.

Charles's final years were rife with conflict and unhappiness. His nephew, Anthony of Vaudémont demanded a part of the inheritance and Charles had to war against him in 1425, without much success. Early in 1429, Joan of Arc came on a pilgrimage to Saint-Nicolas-de-Port. She counselled the duke to abandon his mistress, Alison du May. Ignoring this advice, Charles gave her an escort and sent her on to Chinon. He died two years later at his capital of Nancy on 25 January.

== Family ==
Charles married Margaret of the Palatinate (1376–1434), daughter of Rupert of Germany and Elisabeth of Nuremberg, in 1393, only two daughters survived childhood:

- Isabella (1400–1453), who became Duchess suo jure on his death and married René, later holder of many prestigious titles
- Louis, died young
- Ralph, died young
- Catherine (1407–1439), married Jacob, Margrave of Baden

With his mistress, the aforementioned Alison du May (murdered in Nancy, 25 January 1431), he had five children:

- Ferry d'Einvile (d. 1453/56), Lord of Billestein, Villacourt, Vaxoncourt, Pallegney and Zincourt. He had issue.
- John Pillelipille (d. 1460), Lord of Darnieulles, married Philippa de Marches. He had issue.
- Ferry de Lunéville (fl. c. 1425).
- Catherine (fl. c. 1425).
- Isabelle (d. after 9 August 1457), married in 1425 to Henry of Liocourt.

== See also ==
- Dukes of Lorraine family tree

== Sources ==
- Bogdan, Henry (2007). La Lorraine des Ducs (in French). Perrin.
- Davidson, Clifford; Oosterwijk, Sophie, eds. (2021). John Lydgate, The Dance of Death, and its model, the French Danse Macabre. Brill.
- Kekewich, Margaret L. (2008). The Good King: René of Anjou and Fifteenth Century Europe. Palgrave Macmillan.
- Pernoud, Régine (1982). Joan of Arc by Herself and Her Witnesses. Translated by Hyams, Edward. Scarborough House.
- Pernoud, Regine; Clin, Marie-Veronique (1998). Wheeler, Bonnie (ed.). Joan of Arc: Her Story. Translated by Adams, Jeremy duQuesnay. St. Martin's Griffin.
- Sumption, Jonathan (2015). The Hundred Years War. Vol. 4: Cursed Kings. Faber & Faber.

Charles II of Lorraine House of Metz Born: 1364 Died: 25 January 1431
Preceded by John I	Duke of Lorraine; 1390–1431	Succeeded by Isabella of Lorraine and René of Anjou
