= Catherine of Austria (1420–1493) =

Margravine of Baden-Baden from 1447 to 1475

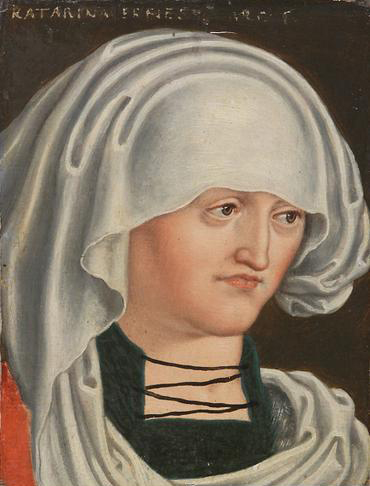
- Portrait by Anton Boys
- Born: 1420; Wiener Neustadt
- Died: 11 September 1493; Hohenbaden Castle in Baden-Baden
- Burial: Baden-Baden
- Spouse: Charles I, Margrave of Baden-Baden
- Issue Detail: Christopher I, Margrave of Baden-Baden; Albert, Margrave of Baden-Hachberg; Frederick
- House: House of Habsburg (by birth); House of Zähringen (by marriage)
- Father: Ernest, Duke of Austria
- Mother: Cymburgis of Masovia

Catherine of Austria (1420 in Wiener Neustadt – 11 September 1493 at Hohenbaden Castle in Baden-Baden) was a member of the House of Habsburg and through marriage Margravine of Baden.

== Life ==
Catherine was a daughter of the Duke Ernest I of Austria and Styria, nicknamed "the Iron" from his marriage to Cymburgis, a daughter of Duke Siemowit IV of Masovia. Catherine's older brother Frederick III was crowned Holy Roman Emperor in 1452. She grew up in Wiener Neustadt, together with her brothers Frederick III and Albert VI.

Catherine married Margrave Charles I of Baden-Baden (1427-1475) in Pforzheim 15 July 1447. She brought him a dowry of 30000ducats. She expressed the preservation of her high rank by putting the Austrian coat of arms next to the shield of Baden in her personal coat of arms. after his marriage, Charles I was appointed governor of Further Austria by Archduke Sigismund of Austria and Tyrol. In this position, he became acquainted with Sigismund's councillor Matthäus Hummel.

Catherine outlived her husband, with whom she was joined in tender marriage for 18 years. She became the ancestress of the House of Baden. Her son Christopher left her Hohenbaden Castle as a widow seat and built the New Castle in Baden-Baden for himself.

Catherine died in 1493 and was buried in Baden-Baden.

== Issue ==
From her marriage with Charles I, Catherine had the following children:

1. Catherine (15 January 1449 – before 8 May 1484), married on 19 May 1464 to Count George III of Werdenberg-Sargans
2. Zimburgis (15 May 1450 – 5 July 1501), married on 19 December 1468 to Count Engelbert II of Nassau-Dillenburg
3. Margareta (1452–1495), Abbess in Lichtenthal
4. Christopher I, Margrave of Baden-Baden (13 November 1453 – 19 April 1527)
5. Albert, Margrave of Baden-Hachberg (1456–1488)
6. Frederick (9 July 1458 – 24 September 1517), Bishop of Utrecht

== Sources ==
- Hohkamp, Michaela (2007). "Sisters, Aunts, and Cousins: Familial Architectures and the Political Field in Early Modern Europe". In Sabean, David Warren; Teuscher, Simon; Mathieu, Jon (eds.). Kinship in Europe: Approaches to Long-Term Development (1300-1900). Berghahn books. pp. 91–104.
- Constant von Wurzbach: Biographisches lexikon des kaiserthums Oesterreich, S. 401 f., K. K. Hof- und Staatsdruckerei, 1860
