= Jacopo Strada =

Italian architect (1507–1588)

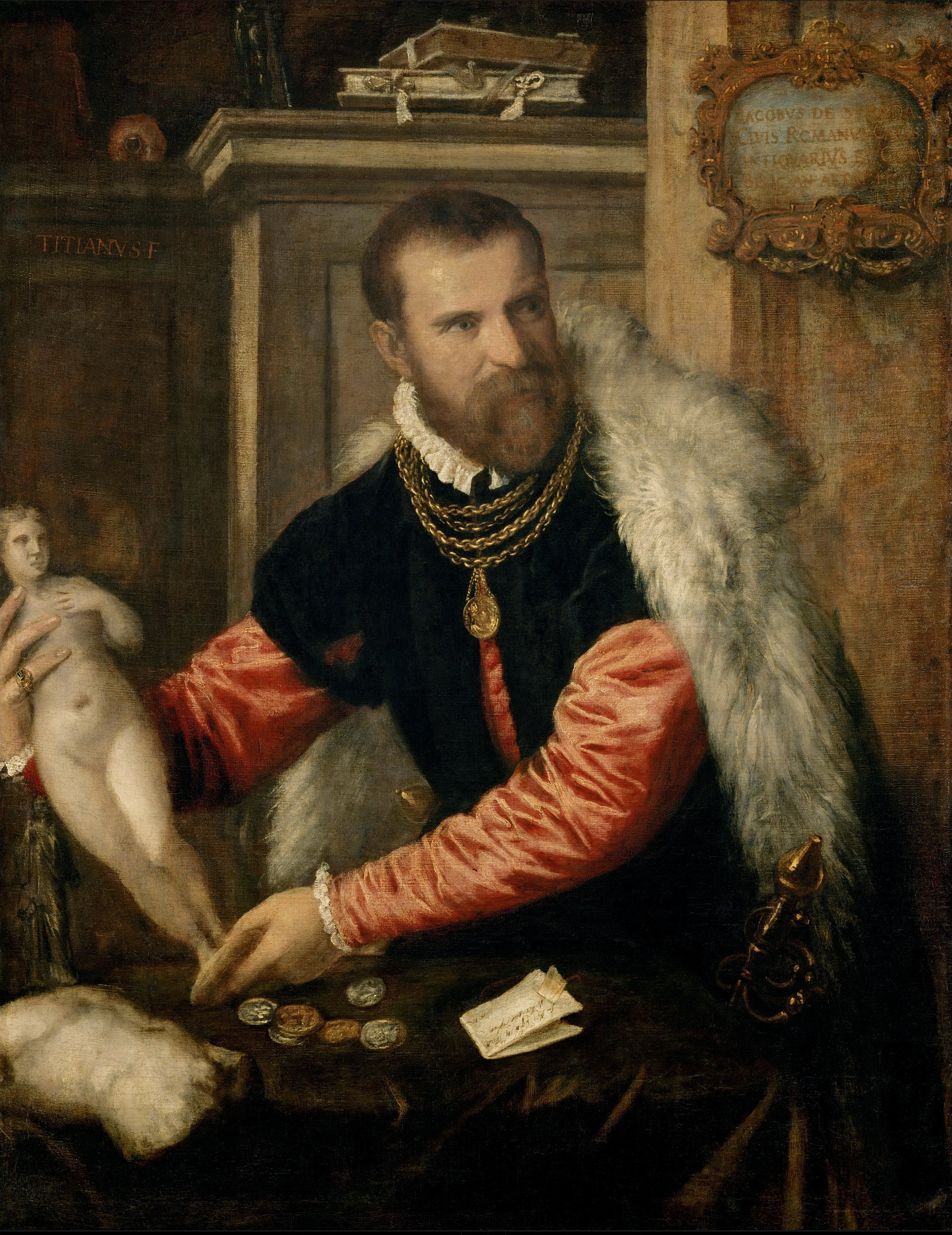
Portrait of Jacopo Strada by Titian, 1567 (Kunsthistorisches Museum, Vienna)

Jacopo Strada (Mantua, 1507 – Prague 1588) was an Italian polymath courtier, painter, architect, goldsmith, inventor of machines, numismatist, linguist, collector, and art dealer. His portrait by Titian has kept his image familiar.

== Biography ==
He is supposed to have received early training as a goldsmith in the Mantua workshops of Giulio Romano; drawings of Giulio's Palazzo del Tè and of its painted interiors and those of the Palazzo Ducale at Mantua, datable 1567-68, are attributed to Jacopo Strada, intended for his Descrizione di tutta Italia. From 1552 to 1555 he sojourned in Lyon and travelled to Rome in the service of Pope Paul III, and after his death his successor Marcellus II, upon whose sudden death he returned north. From 1556 onwards he settled at Vienna and from 1576 served as an official artist and architect to three successive Habsburg Holy Roman emperors, Ferdinand I, Maximilian II and Rudolph II. He also worked for Albert V, Duke of Bavaria (Albrecht), for whom he conceived the Antiquarium to house the antiquities at the Munich Residenz; the Roman sculptures that he assembled for the Duke may still be seen in the setting he devised there.

He also served as the friend and trusted agent of the Augsburg patrician, humanist and book-collector, and a friend and advisor of Albrecht, the immensely rich Jakob Fugger (1516–1557), for whom he scouted works of art in Italy from his headquarters in Mantua. On Fugger's commission he assembled a comprehensive array of coats of arms of Italian nobility, filling fifteen volumes, for Fugger's library. A suite of drawings of ancient coins, that Strada did for Fugger, has found its way into Duke Albrecht's collection and is preserved at Gotha.

In 1544 he wed Gräfin Ottilia Schenk von Roßberg in Lyon. He moved to Nuremberg in 1546, where he was granted the city's freedom as a goldsmith in 1549. In 1556 he moved to Vienna, taking a house that still stands, now Bankgasse 12, and putting his antiquarian knowledge at the disposal of the Habsburg court, and rewarded with the care of the imperial treasury. He worked as architect to Ferdinand I in the ongoing construction of the Hofburg. In December 1566 he journeyed to Albrecht's court in Munich, to oversee the Antiquarium planned in conjunction and competition with Fugger, returning to Vienna in 1568. For Schloss Bučovice near Brünn he provided plans for the owner Jan Šember von Boskovic. For Schloss Neugebäude, begun from scratch (neu gebäude) as a hunting box by Maximilian II in 1568, no architect is reported in surviving documents, but its advanced integration with gardens makes Strada the most likely candidate; its construction, altered by numerous minute changes, abruptly came to an end with the Emperor's death in 1576.

The circumstances surrounding the making of the Titian portrait show Strada in a less favourable light. He visited Venice in 1567-68 to try and acquire for Albrecht the famous collection of art and antiquities left by Gabriele Vendramin (died 1552, and also now mainly remembered as the subject of a Titian portrait, the Portrait of the Vendramin Family). This entailed breaking the terms of Vendramin's will, and in the end the attempt failed. Another deal was hatched with Titian while the negotiations proceeded; Strada was to authenticate for the Emperor Maximilian studio repetitions of works that Titian had painted for Philip II of Spain as originals from the hand of the master himself. In return Titian was to paint Strada's portrait, and to receive a fur from him; perhaps the one that seems to be falling from his shoulders in the portrait. Knowledge of the deal comes from a letter to Fugger by Nicolò Stoppio, a Venetian dealer who was Strada's rival in Fugger's service; this claims Titian disliked Strada, and thought him a charlatan. Although the brilliant quality of the portrait has always been recognised, art historians agree the depiction of Strada is not flattering. The pose is taken from a tomb relief of about 1335 that Titian would have known, where a nobleman offers God his soul, represented as a naked baby. However, in his "expensive den", Strada makes a very different offer to a client: "He manhandles a Venus, whose pudica gesture is wittily cancelled out by his hand clamped on her breast. As a shady character, he has an exceptionally heavy chiaroscuro on his face. His crowning achievement, his works on numismatics (a mixture of erudition and nonsense) are significantly placed above his head. His social ambition is emphasised by Titian's late decision to double the loops of his chain."

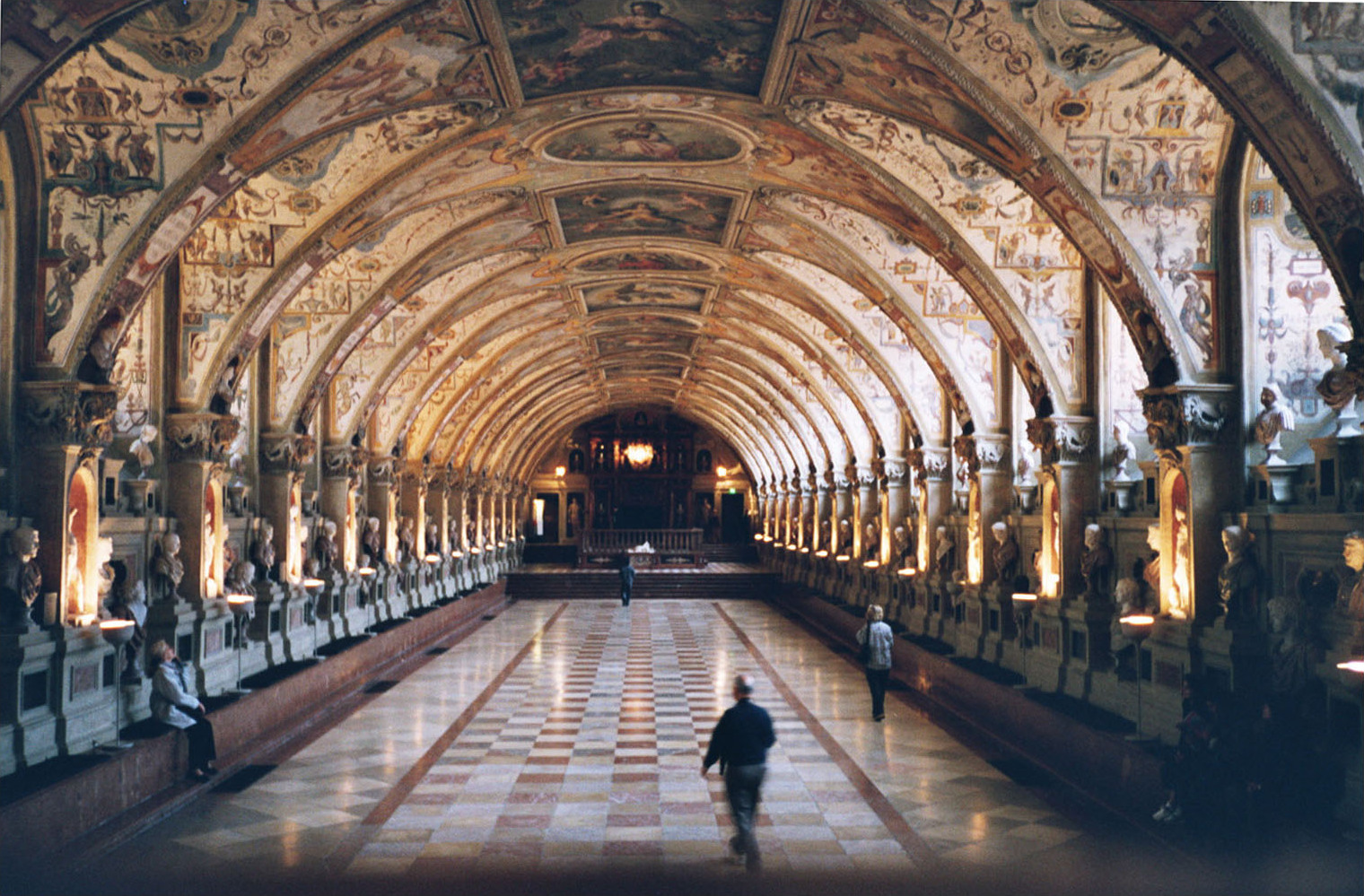
The Antiquarium (begun 1568—71) in the Munich Residenz

He quit Albrecht's service about 1570. During 1571–1574 he compiled a catalogue of the surviving literature of Antiquity and compiled a lexicon. In 1574 his wife Ottilia died. At the end of the year, 27 December, he was accorded noble status. He demolished and rebuilt his dwelling, which housed his library of 3,000 volumes and his Kunstkammer. There he lived until his death, the honoured guest of the emperors. His Palais Strada stood as an eminent example of Late Renaissance architecture in the Simmering district of Vienna until it was demolished in 1875 in the rebuilding of the Wiener Burgtheater.

In 1577 he published in Frankfurt-am-Main Sebastiano Serlio's seventh book of architecture, with its original Italian text, which exists in manuscript on parchment, and Strada's Latin translation. In the introduction Strada reported that he had received the manuscript from Serlio himself in Lyon in 1550.

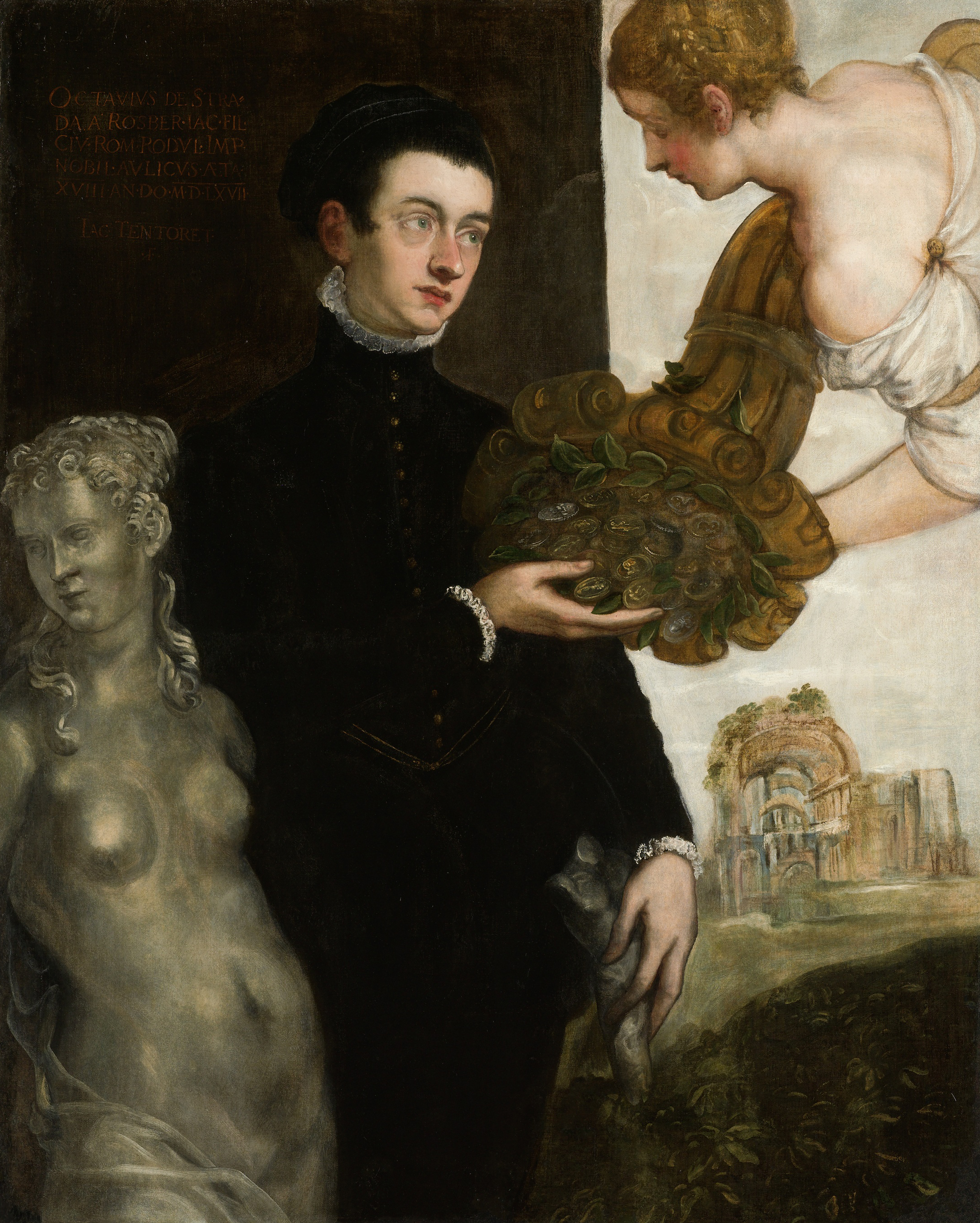
Portrait of Ottavio Strada receiving a cornucopia with coins from Fortuna, an allusion to his study of ancient coins - ascribed to Marietta Robusti (Tintoretto's daughter)

He died in Prague and is buried in the Church of St. Nicholas in the Malá Strana. His son, Ottavio Strada (1550–1607), (Note: was painted about the same time as Titian's of his father.) his assistant at the Hofburg, followed in his father's footsteps in the service of the Imperial court as expert in works of art. Ottavio's daughter Katharina was a favourite of Emperor Rudolph II, and bore him six children.

== Bibliography ==
- Volker Heenes - Dirk Jacob Jansen: Jacopo Strada’s Magnum ac Novum Opus. A Sixteen Century Corpus of ancient Numismatics Petersberg 2022 (Cyriacus 16), ISBN 978-3-7319-0995-8
- Volker Heenes: [Combinations of] Unrelated Obverses and Reverses of Ancient Coins in Jacopo Strada's Numismatic Works In: Online Zeitschrift zur Antiken Numismatik 3 (2021), S. 55-76 doi:10.17879/ozean-2021-3642 (Open Access)
- Volker Heenes: Copies of Ancient Coins and Inventions all’antica in the Work of Jacopo Strada In: Online Zeitschrift zur Antiken Numismatik 2 (2020), S. 53-83. doi:10.17879/ozean-2020-2914(Open Access).
- Volker Heenes: Jacopo Strada In: INC Compte Rendu 66 (2019), ISSN: 1562-6377, S. 17-34. (Open Access).
- Jansen, Dirk Jacob. Urbanissime Strada : Jacopo Strada and cultural patronage at the Imperial Court. Maastricht, 2015. Doctoral thesis.
- Lawrence, Sarah. Jacopo Strada (1510 – 1588). Mannerist Splendor: Extravagant Designs for a Royal Table. San Francisco: Serge Sorokko Gallery, 2007. ISBN 978-0-9797763-0-4
- Panofsky, Erwin. Problems in Titian, Mostly Iconographic. New York University Press, 1969.
