= Nicolò Stoppio =

Italian art dealer

Nic[c]olò Stoppio (died 1570) was an art dealer, who worked for Albert V, Duke of Bavaria in the highly competitive search for Italian works of art and Roman antiquities to add to the ducal collection. The activities of Niccolo Stoppio, his rival Jacopo Strada, and Philipp Hainhofer were characteristic of a new type of intermediary dealer in the most innovative art markets that surfaced in the second half of the 16th century: courtiers who supplied their patrons with news and art gossip, paintings and curiosities, antiquities and the latest books. Stoppio's correspondence with the immensely rich connoisseur of art, also advisor to Albrecht and the source of some of his earliest purchases of antiquities, Hans Jakob Fugger, survives. His rival was Jacopo Strada, whose competence in matters of art connoisseurship he lost no opportunity to belittle. In furnishing Albert's Antiquarium in the Munich Residenz, Stoppio was largely responsible for purchases on the Venetian market of copies of Roman sculptures and of modern works, whereas Strada was the agent through whom Venetian collections of Roman sculptures passed to Albert. Stoppio also passed on nuggets of high gossip:

Orlando is here [in Venice], and he is well, happy, and a good friend to everybody; he will leave here in eight days for Ferrara with a set of madrigals that he had printed and dedicated to that duke. We shall see how generous [the duke] will be

A letter of 14 December 1567 reports that in a former visit to the studio of Titian, then at work on the Venus and Adonis now at the Prado, Stoppio had made two suggestions for improvements in the painting, which Titian followed.
