= Ferdinand of Bavaria (soldier) =

German noble and general (1550–1608)

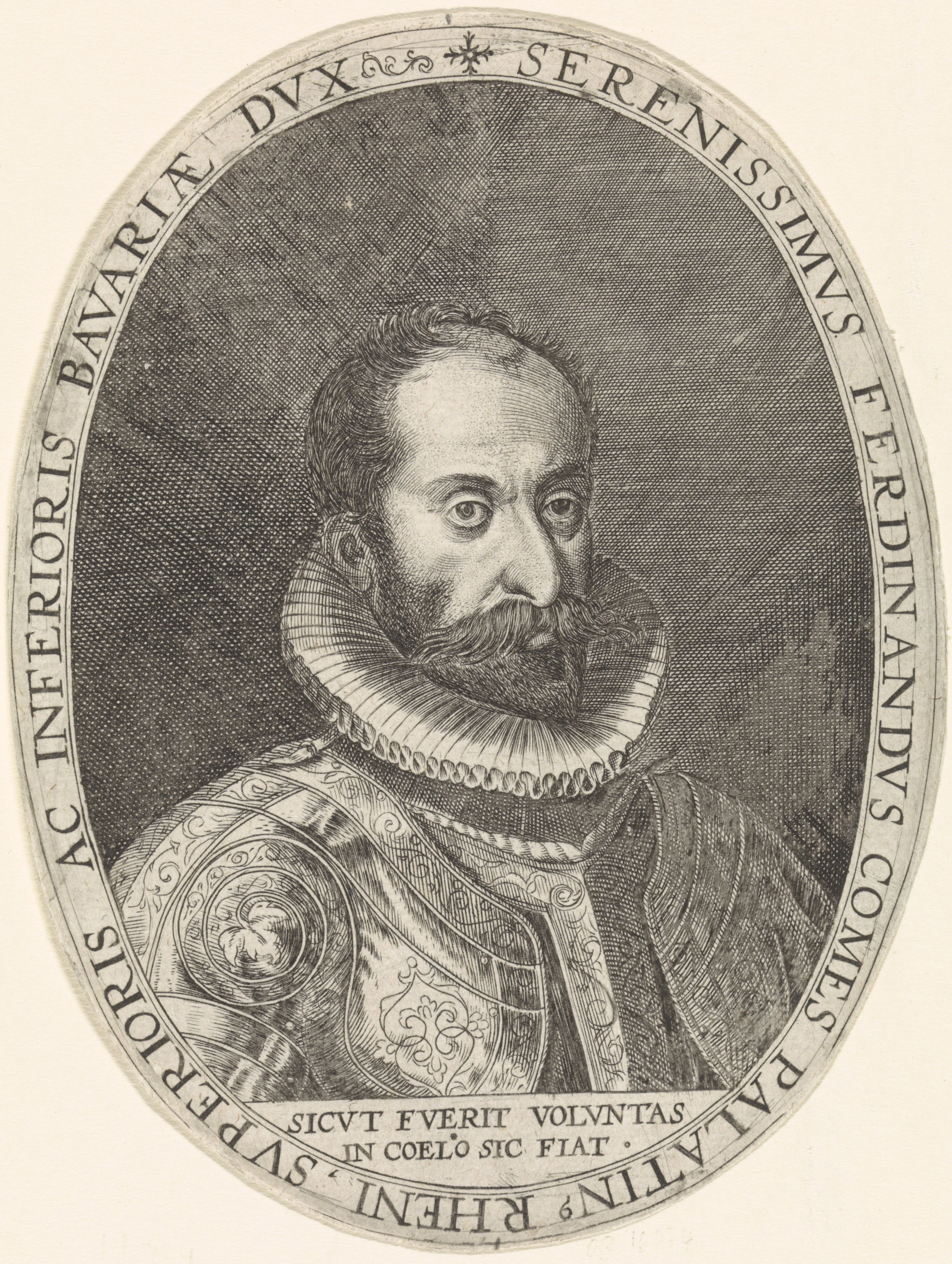
- Engraving of Ferdinand, c. 1600-37
- Born: 20 January 1550; Landshut, Bavaria
- Died: 30 January 1608 (aged 58); Munich, Bavaria
- Spouse: Maria Pettenbeck (m. 1588)
- Issue more...: Franz Wilhelm von Wartenberg
- House: Wittelsbach
- Father: Albert V, Duke of Bavaria
- Mother: Archduchess Anna of Austria

Ferdinand of Bavaria was born 20 January 1550, in Landshut, in the Duchy of Bavaria, and died 30 January 1608 in Munich, at the age of 58. He was the second surviving son of Albert V, Duke of Bavaria, and his wife Archduchess Anna of Austria, and consequently was prepared for a military career. Ferdinand is also known for the two extraordinary diaries he kept, one as fifteen-year-old boy on a journey from Munich to Florence, for his aunt's wedding, and a second journey to Florence, this time as young and experienced man of affairs.

== Youth ==
In 1565, the 15-year-old Ferdinand made a widely publicized journey to Florence, to attend the wedding of his maternal aunt, Johanna of Austria, to Francesco I de' Medici, and to visit with other maternal aunts in the city. Johanna's marriage to the Medici was a politically expedient one: she was expected to produce heirs. The groom's mistress, whom he married after the death of his wife in 1579, was already well-established in 1565: this was a political marriage, and an extravagant one, and cost Duke Cosimo, father of the groom, over 60,000 ducats, a phenomenal sum.

Sending a teen-aged boy into the hot-house of Medici intrigue might have seemed questionable to the sober-minded Wittelsbachs. Albert had supported whole-heartedly the Catholic Counter-Reformation; Jesuits were entrenched at the Jesuit College of Ingolstadt, and had raised his children accordingly. Ferdinand's older brother earned for himself the sobriquet "the Pius" for his melancholy demeanor, his ardent attachment to prayer and meditation, and, more obviously, for his eschewal of hunting, dancing, and other frivolities that dominated social life in a 16th-century court.

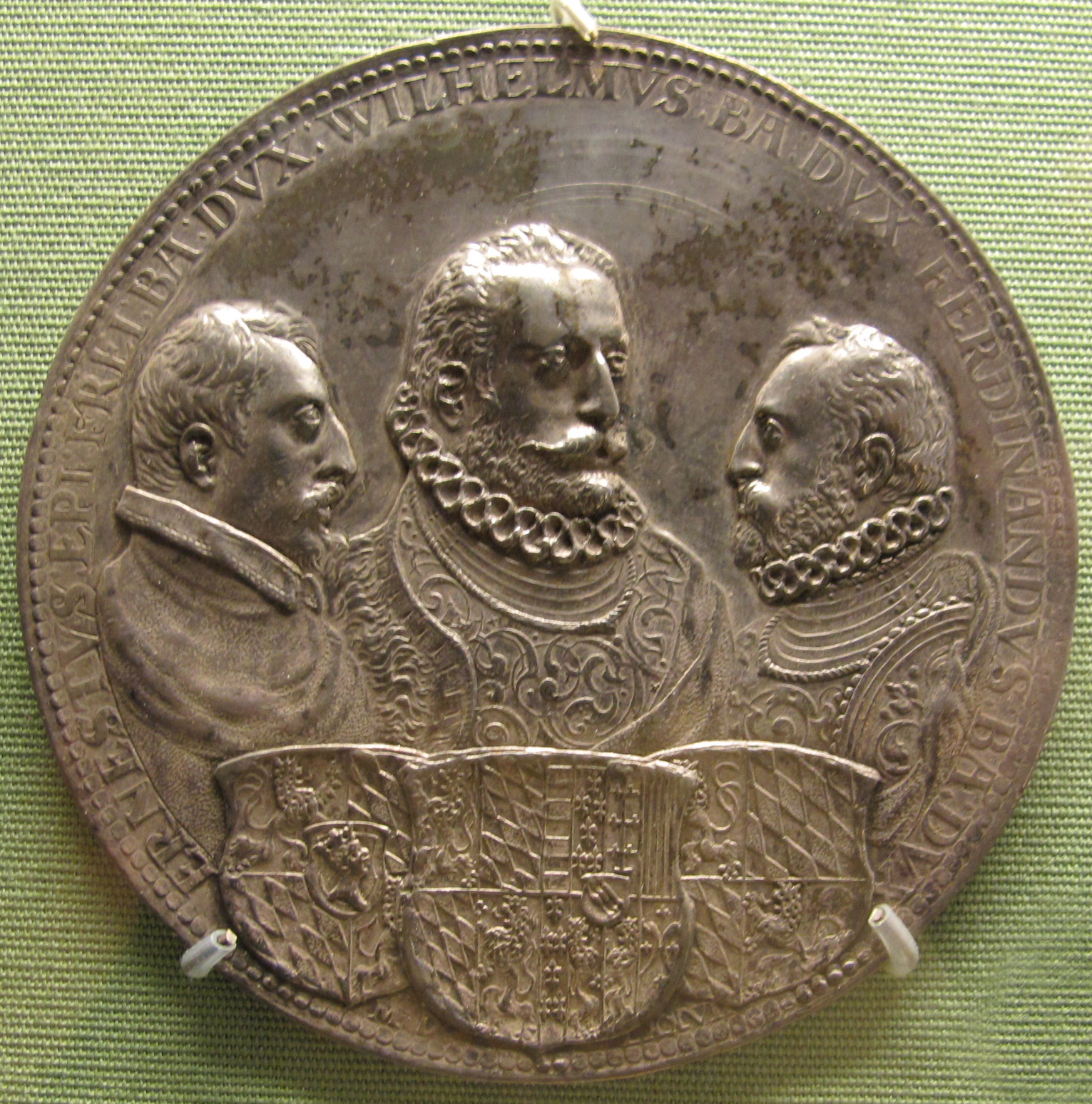
Medal of the brothers Ernst, Wilhelm and Ferdinand of Wittelsbach

The Emperor chided his father on sending his second son, not sending William, heir to the duchy, but Albert pointed out that he was not able, on such short notice, to put together an appropriate entourage for the heir; the second son would have to do. Ferdinand's entourage was no mean affair. His chief financial adviser, Hans Jakob Fugger, served as chief steward on the journey, and Fugger's son as Ferdinand's cup-bearer. They traveled by horseback, sledge, boat, and carriage in the journey that took four months, from Munich to Florence and back to Munich, and throughout the entire journey, Ferdinand maintained a journal, unusually written in the third person, about his adventure. Through Ferdinand's eyes, via his journal, we have an unusual picture of mid-16th century masquerades, musical performances, and comedies, the experience of which Ferdinand brought with him when he returned to Munich in February of the following year.

On another journey, as a guest of the emperor in Vienna, he recorded the near riot during the Corpus Christi procession of 1578. As he and the archdukes Ferdinand and Maximilian heard the mass, the population harassed the celebrant priests, and interfered with the conduct of the procession itself.

== Career ==
His younger brother, Ernst, was elected to the Archbishopric of Cologne, in 1583, as part of the conflict over the control of the electoral see. Ferdinand took command of his brother's army during the Cologne War; his able management of the army, plus the support of troops from the Spanish Netherlands, secured the electoral dignity for his brother, and consolidated the family's place in imperial politics.

== Personal life ==
Ferdinand made a morganatic marriage with Maria Pettenbeck on 26 September 1588. The 16 children of this marriage were raised to the status of Counts and Countesses of Wartenberg. The line died out in 1736. Since then the title has also been used by various members of the Royal House of Bavaria.

- Maria Maximiliane, Countess, Nun in Munich's Riedler Regelhaus, 1589-1638
- Maria Magdalena, Countess, Nun in Munich's Riedler Regelhaus 1590–1620
- Maria Magdalena von Wartenberg, 1592–1598
- Franz Wilhelm, Count of Wartenberg, Bischop of Osnabruck 1593–1661
- Maria Anna of Wartenberg, Nun in Kuhbach Benedictine Cloister, 1594–1629
- Sebastian of Wartenberg 1595–1596
- Ernst of Wartenberg 1596–1597
- Maximillian, Count of Wartenberg 1602–1679
- Ernst Benno, Count of Wartinberg 1605–1606
- Maria Katharina of Wartenberg, 1605–1606
- Ferdinand Lorenz, Count of Wartenberg 1606–1666
- Maria Klara Theresia of Wartenberg 1608–1635

He is buried in the cathedral in Munich, Bavaria.

His surviving siblings were

- William V, Duke of Bavaria 1548–1626
- Maria Anna of Bavaria, 1551–1608, married her uncle, Charles II, archduke of Austria, and was the mother of Ferdinand II, Holy Roman Emperor
- Maximiliana Maria of Bavaria, 1552–1614
- Ernst of Bavaria, Elector of Cologne, 1554–1612

== Ancestry ==
Ancestors of Ferdinand of Bavaria (soldier)

16. Albert III, Duke of Bavaria
8. Albert IV, Duke of Bavaria
17. Anna of Brunswick-Grubenhagen-Einbeck
4. William IV, Duke of Bavaria
18. Frederick III, Holy Roman Emperor
9. Kunigunde of Austria
19. Eleanor of Portugal
Albert V, Duke of Bavaria
20. Christopher I, Margrave of Baden-Baden
10. Philip I, Margrave of Baden-Sponheim
21. Ottilie von Katzenelnbogen
5. Marie of Baden-Sponheim
22. Philip, Elector Palatine
11. Elisabeth of the Palatinate
23. Margaret of Bavaria
Ferdinand of Bavaria
24. Maximilian I, Holy Roman Emperor
12. Philip I of Castile
25. Mary of Burgundy
6. Ferdinand I, Holy Roman Emperor
26. Ferdinand II of Aragon
13. Joanna of Castile
27. Isabella I of Castile
Archduchess Anna of Austria
28. Casimir IV Jagiellon
14. Vladislaus II of Bohemia and Hungary
29. Archduchess Elisabeth of Austria
7. Anna of Bohemia and Hungary
30. Gaston de Foix, Count of Candale
15. Anna of Foix-Candale
31. Infanta Catherine of Navarre
