= Hans Muelich =

German painter

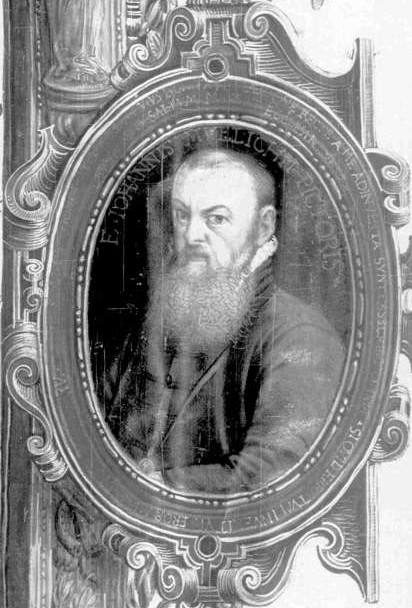
Small selfportrait of Muelich as illustrator, detail of title page of Orlando di Lasso's Penitential Psalms

Hans Muelich or Mielich (1516 – 1573), was a German painter and woodcutter.

== Biography ==
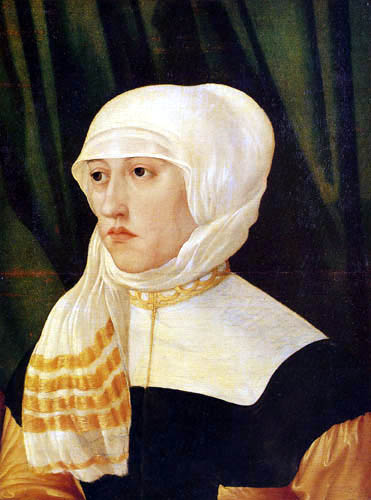
Portrait of a lady, 1540

He was born in Munich as the son of the city painter Wolfgang Muelich and studied with Barthel Beham. He is known as a portrait painter and for historical allegories. In 1536 he moved to Regensburg where he met Albrecht Altdorfer, and in 1541 he travelled to Rome. On his return to Munich in 1543 he became a member of the painter's guild there.

In 1552, Albert V, Duke of Bavaria commissioned an inventory of the jewelry which he and his wife owned. The resulting manuscript, still held by the Bavarian State Library, was the Jewel Book of the Duchess Anna of Bavaria ("Kleinodienbuch der Herzogin Anna von Bayern"), containing 110 drawings by Hans Muelich.

His most important work were portraits of leading Munich patricians and religious works in the Ingolstadt church. He died in Munich.
