= Don Julius Caesar d'Austria =

Illegitimate son of Rudolf II, Holy Roman Emperor

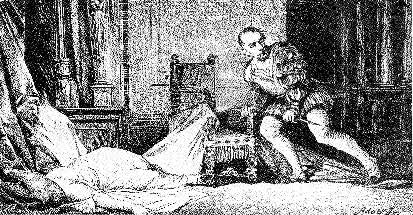
Don Julius Caesar after the murder of Markéta Pichlerová (by Adolf Liebscher)

Don Julius Caesar d'Austria (1584 or 1585—25 June 1609) was the oldest illegitimate son of Holy Roman Emperor Rudolf II and his long-term mistress, Catherina Strada. Don Julius had schizophrenia and died while he was serving a life sentence in prison after the murder of his lover Markéta Pichlerová in 1608.

== Early life ==
D'Austria was born in 1584 or 1585, the eldest of their six children. Despite his illegitimacy, Emperor Rudolf II provided his son with a comprehensive education and actively sought a good position at a royal court.

== Český Krumlov Castle ==
Emperor Rudolf purchased Český Krumlov Castle to serve as his son's seat, and Don Julius arrived first in 1605. In 1607, Don Julius invited Markéta Pichlerová, the daughter of a local barber, to live with him, and her parents agreed. Showing signs of mental illness, Don Julius behaved violently towards Pichlerová, including cutting and beating her. Thinking that he had killed her, he tossed her body out of a window, but she survived and recovered.

According to the local chronicler Václav Březan, "She was so terribly damaged that she was no longer a single piece of body, and in this condition she was thrown by him to the rocks. But it wasn't meant to be her last hour, because she fell on a rubbish heap which saved her life. Once she was healthy again she hid herself from him, but he kept returning to her mother so Markéta had to go to him again."

== Murder and death ==
Don Julius requested for her parents to allow her to return. When her father refused, Don Julius put him in prison. After five weeks, the father relented, and Markéta returned. On Monday, 17 February 1608, Don Julius murdered Markéta and disfigured her body. Březan recorded the event: "On the 17th of February, Julius, that awful tyrant and devil, bastard of the Emperor, did an incredibly terrible thing to his bed partner, the daughter of a barber, when he cut off her head and other parts of her body, and people had to put her into her coffin in single pieces".

Emperor Rudolf did not defend his son and ordered his imprisonment for the remainder of his life. Julius died on 25 June 1609 after showing significant signs of schizophrenia by refusing to bathe and living in squalour. His death was apparently caused by an ulcer that ruptured.
