= Archduchess Anna of Austria =

Duchess of Bavaria from 1550 to 1579

Anna of Austria
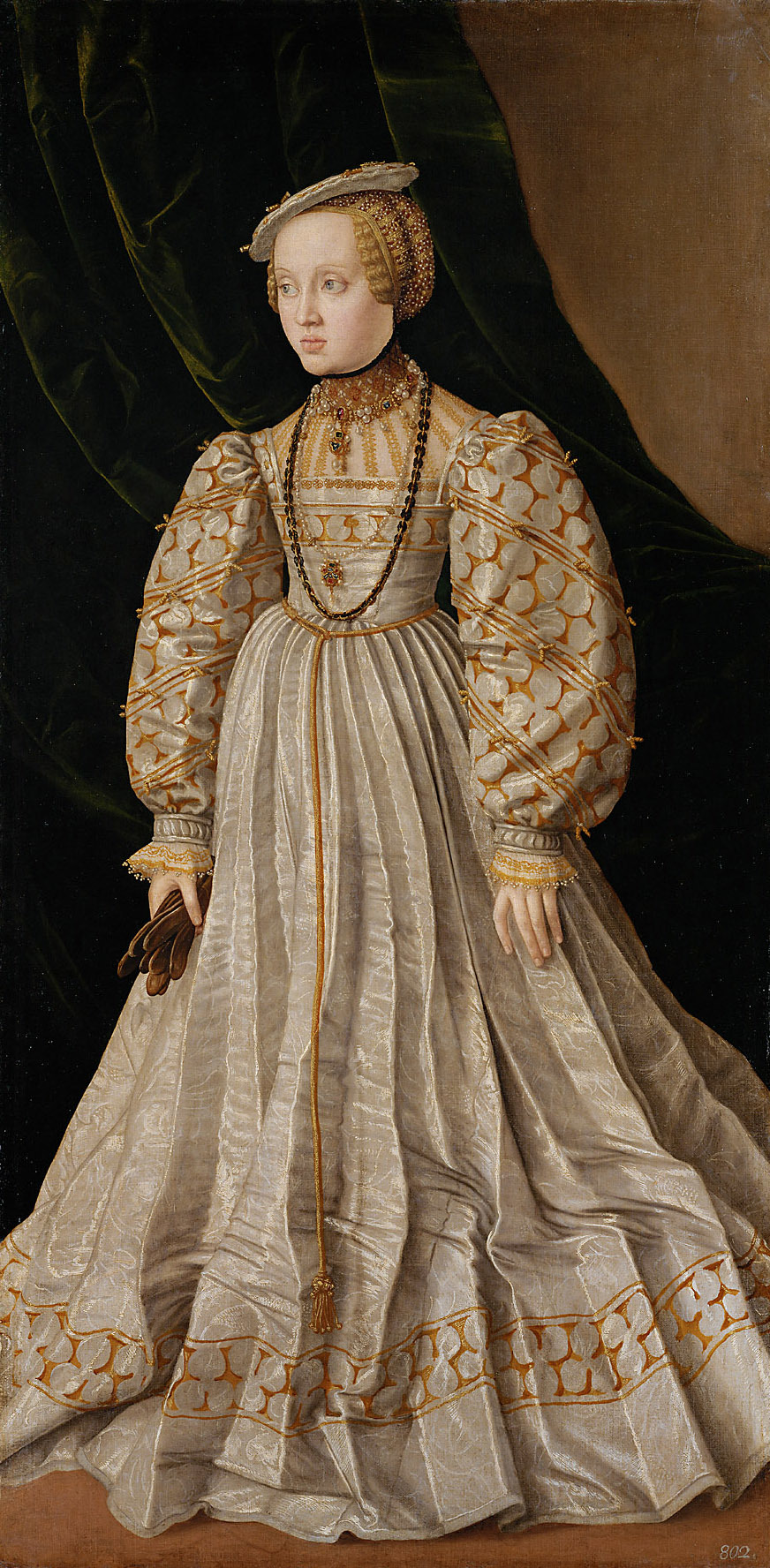
- Portrait by Jakob Seisenegger (c. 1545)

Duchess consort of Bavaria
- Tenure: 7 March 1550 – 24 October 1579
- Born: 7 July 1528; Prague, Kingdom of Bohemia, Holy Roman Empire
- Died: 16 October 1590 (aged 62); Munich, Duchy of Bavaria, Holy Roman Empire
- Spouse: Albert V, Duke of Bavaria (m. 1546; died 1579)
- Issue more...: William V, Duke of Bavaria; Ferdinand of Bavaria; Maria Anna, Archduchess of Austria; Maximiliana Maria of Bavaria; Ernest of Bavaria
- House: Habsburg
- Father: Ferdinand I, Holy Roman Emperor
- Mother: Anna of Bohemia and Hungary

Anna of Austria (7 July 1528 – 16 October 1590), a member of the Imperial House of Habsburg, was Duchess of Bavaria from 1550 until 1579, by her marriage with Duke Albert V.

== Family ==
=== Early life ===
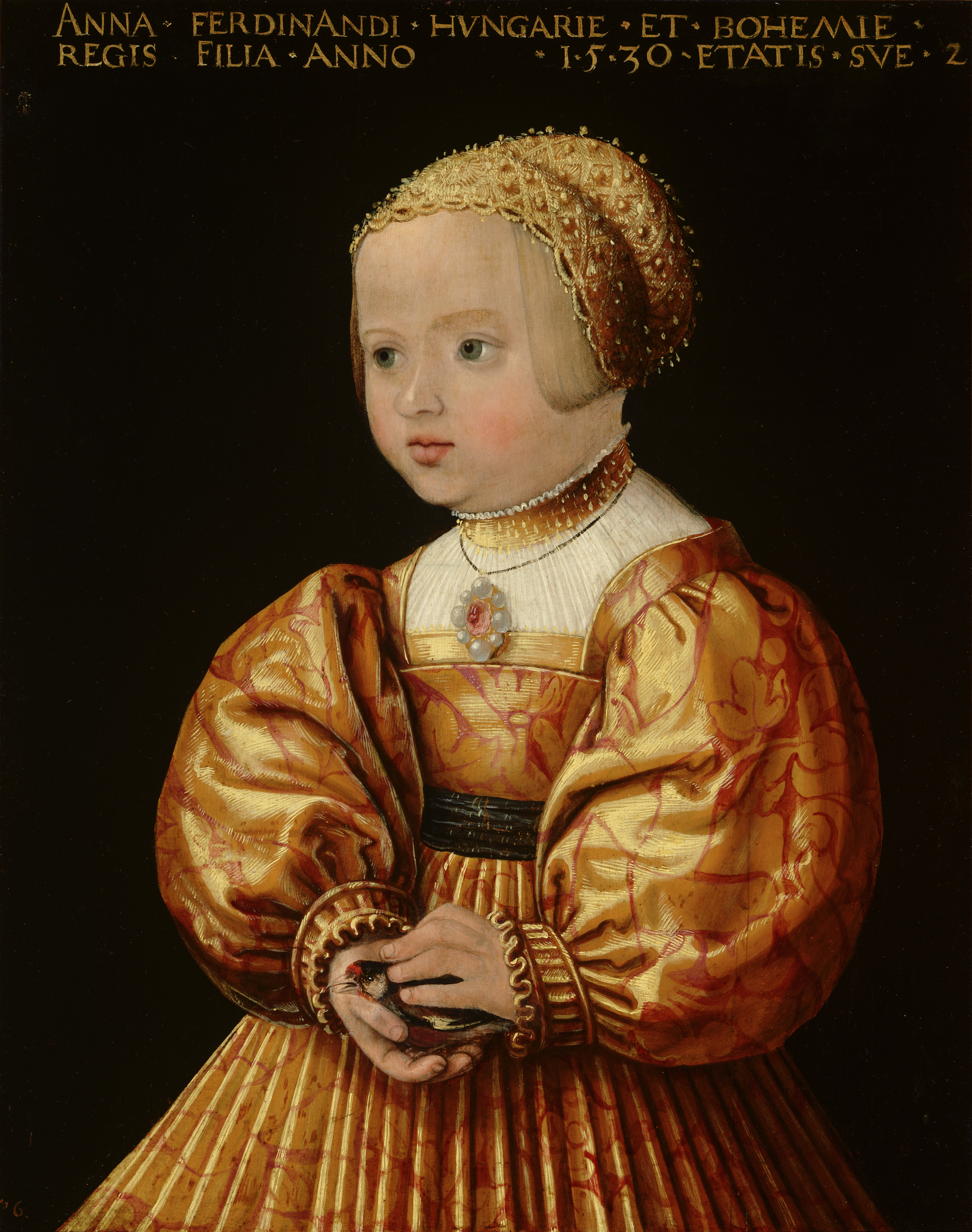
Portrait of Anna of Austria, at the age of two (1530) by Jacob Seisenegger, at Mauritshuis

Born at the Bohemian court in Prague, Anna was the third of fifteen children of King Ferdinand I (1503–1564) from his marriage with the Jagiellonian princess Anna of Bohemia and Hungary (1503–1547). Her siblings included: Elizabeth, Queen of Poland, Maximilian II, Holy Roman Emperor, Ferdinand II, Archduke of Austria, Catherine, Queen of Poland, Eleanor, Duchess of Mantua, Barbara, Duchess of Ferrara, Charles II, Archduke of Austria and Johanna, Duchess of Tuscany.

Anna's paternal grandparents were King Philip I of Castile and his wife Queen Joanna of Castile. Her maternal grandparents were King Vladislaus II of Bohemia and Hungary and his third wife Anne of Foix-Candale.

Anna was sickly at birth and since it was feared she would die, she was quickly baptized. The baptism was performed by the cardinal Bernardo Clesio. Anna was said to be the favourite daughter of Ferdinand, who affectionately called her "little monkey".

As both of Anna's parents had a love of learning, she received a strict and thorough education from the humanist Kaspar Ursinus Velius. They learned German, Italian and French, and received a strict Catholic religious education. Both of Anna's parents were devout Catholics; Ferdinand on one occasion threatened to have anyone who exposed his children to Lutheranism executed. Anna and her sisters were also taught to play keyboard instruments^{1} and to dance.

In 1538, Anna and her siblings Maximilian, Ferdinand and Elizabeth traveled with their father to Linz before traveling on to Vienna. This was so that they could gain some experience in handling themselves in a formal court environment and also prepare for being confirmed in the Catholic faith. The confirmation took place October 8, 1539 in the royal chapel, with a Venetian envoy acting as Anna's god-father. The cardinal Girolamo Aleandro who conducted the ceremony described Anna and her siblings as resembling "a chorus of angels".

=== Marriage plans ===
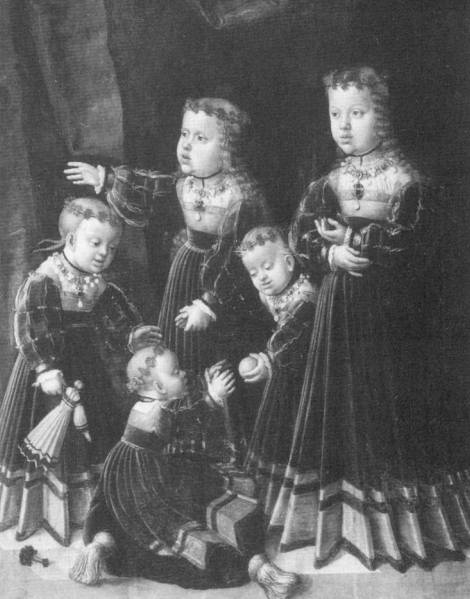
Anna with her sisters (second from the right) by Jakob Seisenegger (1534) Buonconsiglio castle, Trento

In 1530, the three-year-old Anna was betrothed to Theodor of Bavaria, son of William IV, Duke of Bavaria, but he died at a young age in 1534. This left Anna available for new marriage projects which could further the political policies of the Habsburgs.

Anna's uncle, Charles V, had since been engaged in a long conflict against Francis I of France over the Duchy of Milan. Both sides finding themselves in a stalemate on 19 September 1544, the Treaty of Crépy was signed and as a way to cement the peace, it was agreed that the son of Francis I, Charles II de Valois, Duke of Orléans had a choice to marry either Charles V's daughter Maria or his niece Anna. Maria would bring the Netherlands or the Low Countries of Franche-Comté as her dowry while Anna would bring Milan as her dowry. Charles chose Anna, but the marriage never materialized as Charles died of plague on 9 September 1545.

In 1546, Anna had two suitors for her hand in marriage, this was William of Cleves and Albert V of Bavaria (the younger brother of Anna's former betrothed Theodor).

== Marriage ==
In June 1546 Anna, along with her mother and her sister, arrived in Regensburg to finalize marriage negotiations and to meet the prospective grooms.

William had initially been given the choice between Anna and her younger sister Maria for a bride. He chose Anna, but eventually it was deemed more politically prudent that Albert marry Anna. The Wittelsbaches lands bordered Austria and were a potential threat which had to be neutralized by a marriage to a Habsburg, and there was also the expectation of help from the young Duke in Charles V's war against the Schmakaldic league. Anna's father Ferdinand also required that Anna renounce her and her descendants claims to the Habsburg inheritance. Anna's dowry was set at 50,000 guilders.

But before Anna and Albert could be wed they would need a papal dispensation since they were second cousins through Kunigunde of Austria being the grandmother of Albert and her brother Maximilian I, Holy Roman Emperor being the great-grandfather of Anna. An envoy was hastily dispatched to Rome to obtain the dispensation from Pope Paul III. The dispensation was granted on 17 June, and the marriage contract was signed on 19 June.

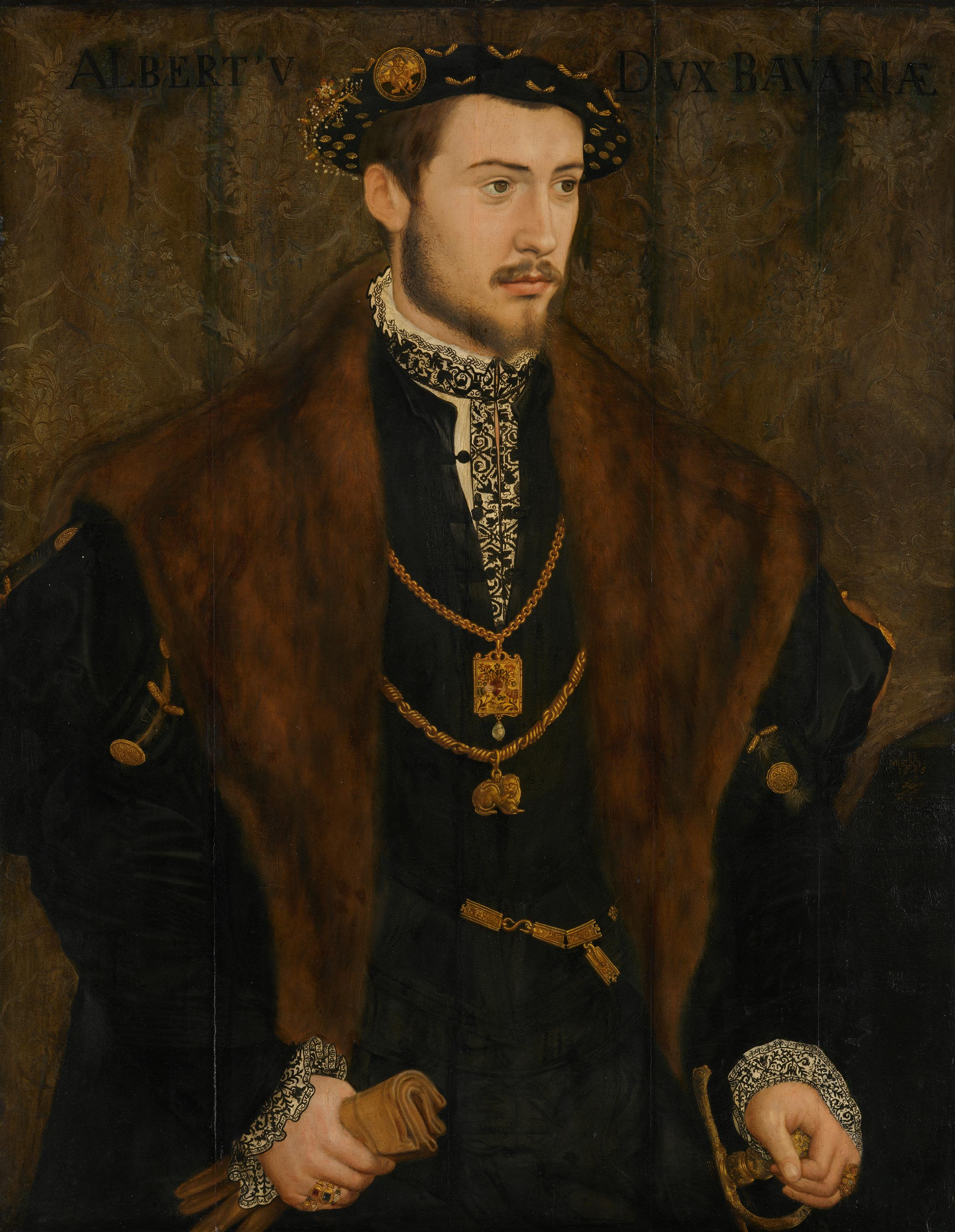
Albert V of Bavaria by Hans Mielich

Anna was married to Albert on 4 July 1546 in a lavish ceremony with festivities which lasted for eight days, and two weeks later on 18 July 1546, Anna's sister married the Duke of Jülich-Kleve.

After the marriage festivities were over, Anna and her new husband left for Bavaria, accompanied by her brother Maximilian.

The young couple lived at the Trausnitz Castle in Landshut until Albert became duke upon his father's death on 7 March 1550. At the Munich Residenz, Anna and Albert had great influence on the spiritual life in the Duchy of Bavaria, and enhanced the reputation of Munich as a city of art, by founding several museums and laying the foundations for the Bavarian State Library.

Anna and Albert were also patrons to the painter Hans Muelich and the Franco-Flemish composer Orlande de Lassus. In 1552, the duke commissioned an inventory of the jewellery in the couple's possession. The resulting manuscript, still held by the Bavarian State Library, was the Jewel Book of the Duchess Anna of Bavaria ("Kleinodienbuch der Herzogin Anna von Bayern"), and contains 110 drawings by Hans Muelich.

A religious woman, Anna made extensive donations to the Catholic abbey of Vadstena in Sweden and generously supported the Franciscan Order. She also provided a strict education of her grandson, the later Elector Maximilian I of Bavaria.

=== Widowhood ===
When her husband died on 24 October 1579 and was succeeded by his eldest surviving son, William V, Anna as duchess dowager maintained her own court at the Munich Residenz. In 1740, 150 years after her death in 1590, her descendant Elector Charles Albert of Bavaria would use her marriage treaty with Albert as a pretext to claim the Austrian and Bohemian crown lands of the Habsburg monarchy.

== Death ==
Anna died 15 October 1590 in Munich and was laid to rest in Frauenkirche.

== Children ==
The marriage of Anna and Albert produced the following children:

- Karl (7 September 1547 – 7 December 1547)
- William V (29 September 1548 – 7 February 1626)
- Ferdinand (20 January 1550 – 30 January 1608)
- Maria Anna (21 March 1551 – 29 April 1608); married Archduke Charles II of Austria
- Maximiliana Maria (4 July 1552 – 11 July 1614), died unmarried
- Friedrich (26 July 1553 – 18 April 1554)
- Ernst (17 December 1554 – 17 February 1612), Archbishop of Cologne

== Ancestors ==
Ancestors of Archduchess Anna of Austria

8. Maximilian I, Holy Roman Emperor
4. Philip I of Castile
9. Mary, Duchess of Burgundy
2. Ferdinand I, Holy Roman Emperor
10. Ferdinand II of Aragon
5. Joanna of Castile
11. Isabella I of Castile
1. Anna of Austria
12. Casimir IV Jagiellon
6. Vladislaus II of Bohemia and Hungary
13. Elizabeth of Austria
3. Anne of Bohemia and Hungary
14. Gaston II, Count of Candale
7. Anne of Foix-Candale
15. Catherine of Foix

== Notes ==
^{1}Musical instruments such as the virginal, the clavichord and the cembalo

Royal titles
Preceded by Marie of Baden-Sponheim	Duchess consort of Bavaria; 1550–1579	Succeeded by Renata of Lorraine
