= Kateřina Stradová =

Czech noblewoman

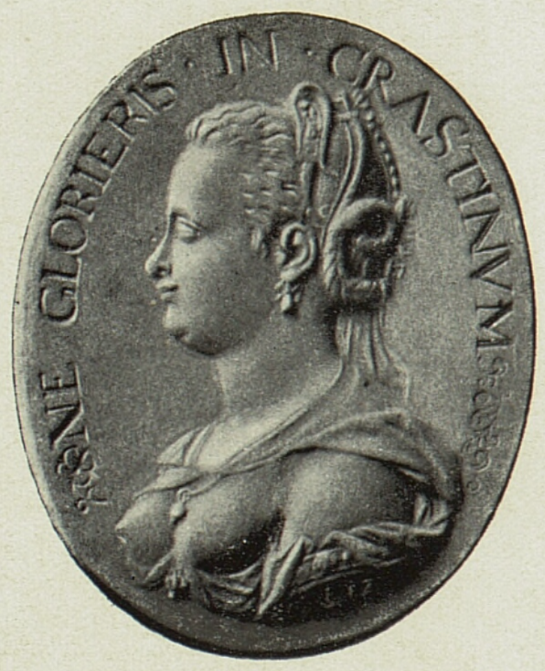
Catherina Strada by Paulus van Vianen

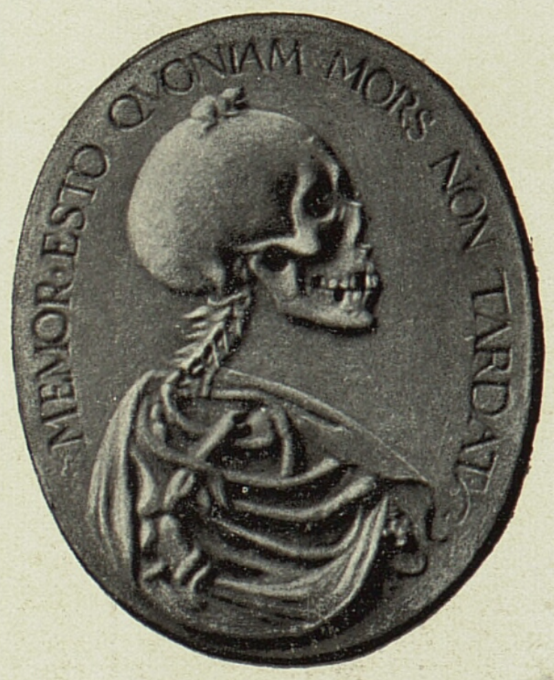
Catherina Strada by Paulus van Vianen

Images published in Český svět

Kateřina Stradová also known as Anna Marie Stradová and Catherina Strada (c. 1568-1629), was the mistress of Rudolf II, Holy Roman Emperor, with whom she had six children.

Kateřina Stradová was the daughter of the painter Ottavio Strada the Elder, the sister of the painter Ottavio Strada the Younger, and the grand-daughter of the dealer and courtier Jacopo Strada. She became the mistress of Rudolf II at about the age of fifteen. She was given the title of countess. They had six children, but only their eldest son is well attested in historical records. She was given the title of countess and is described as bright and attentive, educated in Vienna, and was said to have fine and gracious features.

== Children ==
She had six children with Rudolf:

1. Don Julius Caesar d'Austria
2. Matyáš d’Austria
3. Carlos d’Austria
4. Karolina d’Austria
5. Dorothea d’Austria
6. Alžběta d’Austria

== In popular culture ==
In the films The Emperor and the Golem and The Baker's Emperor, she was played by Marie Vášová.
