= Maximiliana Maria of Bavaria =

Bavarian princess

Maximiliana Maria
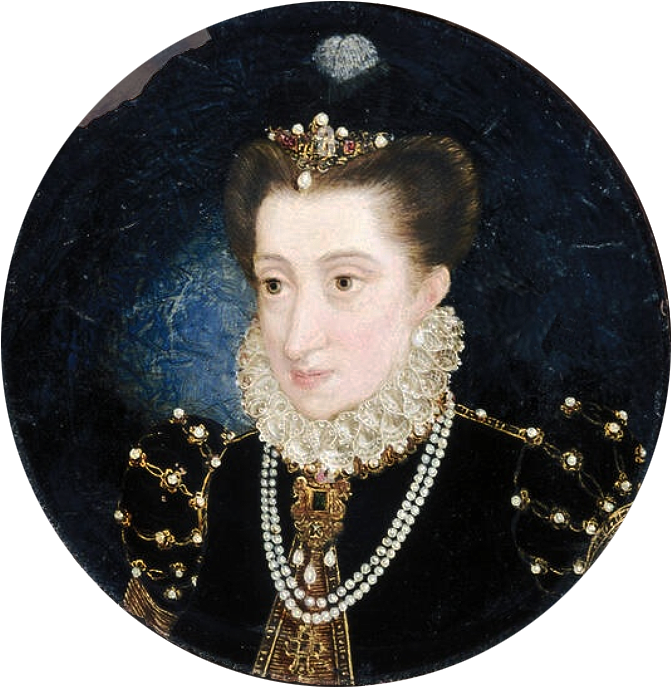
- Miniature of Maximiliana Maria of Bavaria (c. 1578)
- Born: 4 July 1552; Munich, Duchy of Bavaria; Holy Roman Empire
- Died: 11 July 1614 (aged 62); Munich, Duchy of Bavaria; Holy Roman Empire
- Burial: Munich Frauenkirche
- House: Wittelsbach
- Father: Albert V, Duke of Bavaria
- Mother: Archduchess Anna of Austria

Princess Maximiliana Maria of Bavaria (4 July 1552 – 11 July 1614) was a Bavarian princess.

== Biography ==
=== Early life ===
Maximiliana was born on 4 July 1552 in Munich. She was the youngest daughter of Albert V, Duke of Bavaria and his wife Archduchess Anna of Austria, a daughter of Ferdinand I, Holy Roman Emperor. She was educated in music and trained under Hans Schachinger. As an appreciator of music, she became close with the family of Orlande de Lassus.

Both of her parents being devout Catholics Maximiliana was also raised in this strict adherence to this faith and was towards the later part of her life described as being "withdrawn and pious like a nun".

=== Marriage plans ===
From a young age Maximiliana was the subject of many marital projects and the proposed matches included Henry I., Duke of Guise and Guidobaldo II della Rovere.

Maximiliana was also of interest to John Sigismund Zápolya, being as she was the grand-daughter of Anne of Hungary and Bohemia. Such a marriage would have legitimized Zapolyas claim on Hungary. In the end Zapolya had to give up his aspirations for the Hungarian crown and sign the Treaty of Speyer in 1570. Zapolya acknowledged Maximilian II as the sole king of Hungary and died the following year.

There were also overtures from the Portuguese beginning in 1573, to have Maximiliana marry her second cousin king Sebastian of Portugal. Sebastians grand-mother and Maximiliana's great-aunt Catherine of Austria supported this marriage and sent two elaborate Lankan ivory caskets as a gift to the Bavarian court. It was also rumored that Alfonso II d'Este, who was the widower of Maximiliana's aunt Barbara of Austria, had an interest in marrying her.These marital projects did not however materialize and Alfonso instead married Maximiliana's cousin Margherita Gonzaga.

The impediments to Maximiliana's marriage seem to have been due partly to shifting politics and partly because, although Maximiliana had many valuable family connections, both her and her sister`s dowries seem to have been small, which deterred potential husbands.

After the death of the morganatic wife of her maternal uncle Ferdinand II, Archduke of Austria in 1582, he decided to make a political marriage which would give him legitimate heirs.The twenty-nine year old Maximiliana was considered a candidate. Maximiliana's elder sister Maria Anna had been married to another uncle,Charles II, Archduke of Austria in 1571. In the end Ferdinand however considered Maximiliana too old, and instead married another niece (and a cousin of Maximiliana´s) Anna Juliana Gonzaga.

=== Later life ===
Maximiliana never married and lived at the court of her brother William V, Duke of Bavaria.William provided for her care, granting her an allowance of 6,000 guilders. Her brother would build small, richly furnished private chapels for individual members of the family in connection with their living quarters, these chamber chapels "(German: Kammerkapellen), and she would also at times live as a tertiary in the Ridler monastery (German : Ridler Frauen Closter" in Munich.

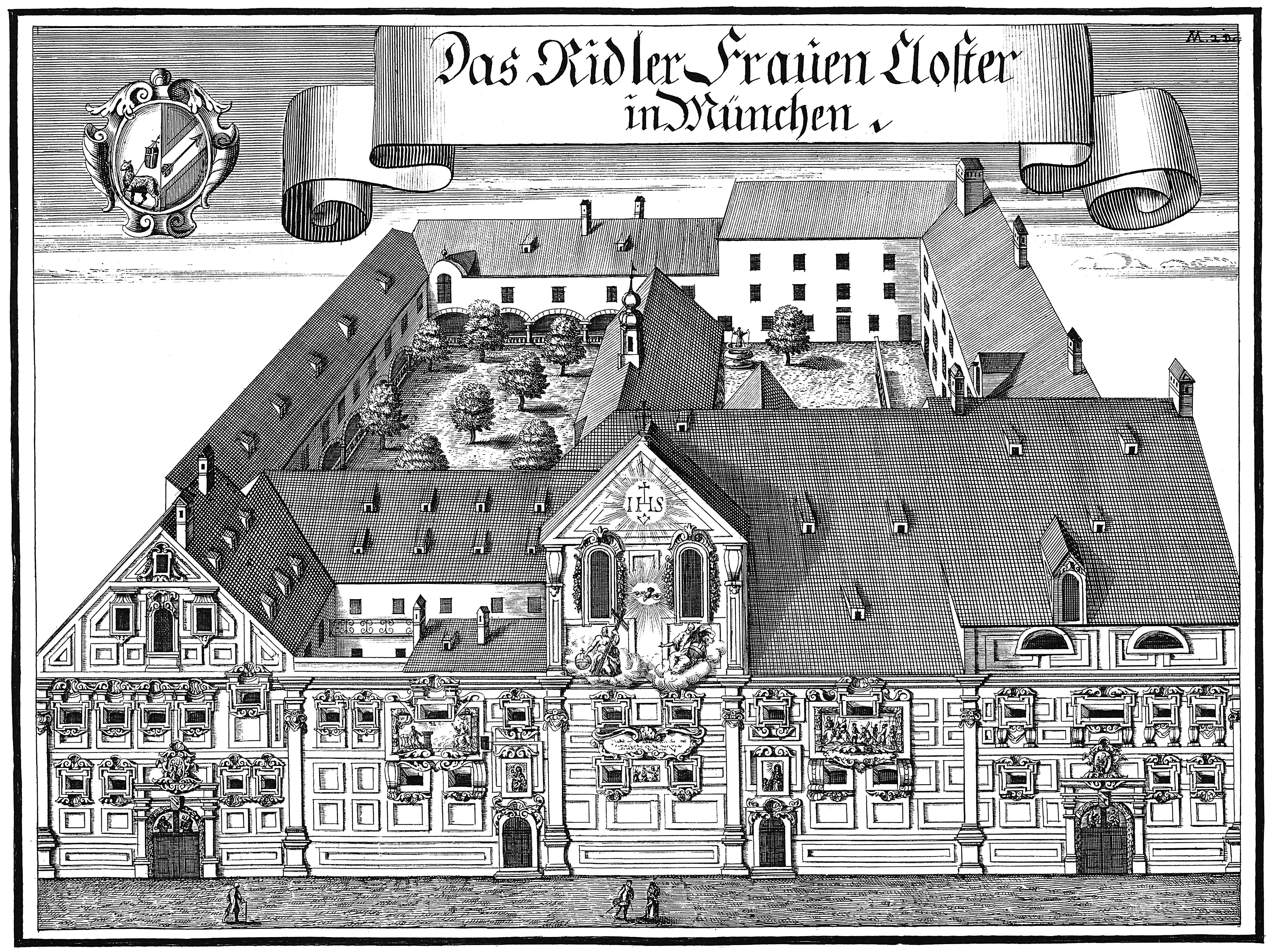
Engraving of Ridler monastery (1701) by Michael Wenig

She was however not completely withdrawn from the secular world. Maximiliana and her sister Maria Anna, the consort of Charles II, orchestrated the to marriage of their niece, Maria Anna, with Ferdinand, Archduke of Inner Austria. She lived for three years in Austria with her sister before returning to Munich in 1598. Maximiliana moved into the Wilhelminische Veste in 1603.

== Death ==
She died on 11 July 1614 and was buried at the Cathedral of Our Dear Lady in Munich.
