= Antiquarium =

Renaissance hall in the Munich Residenz

Coordinates: 48.1407°N 11.5789°E

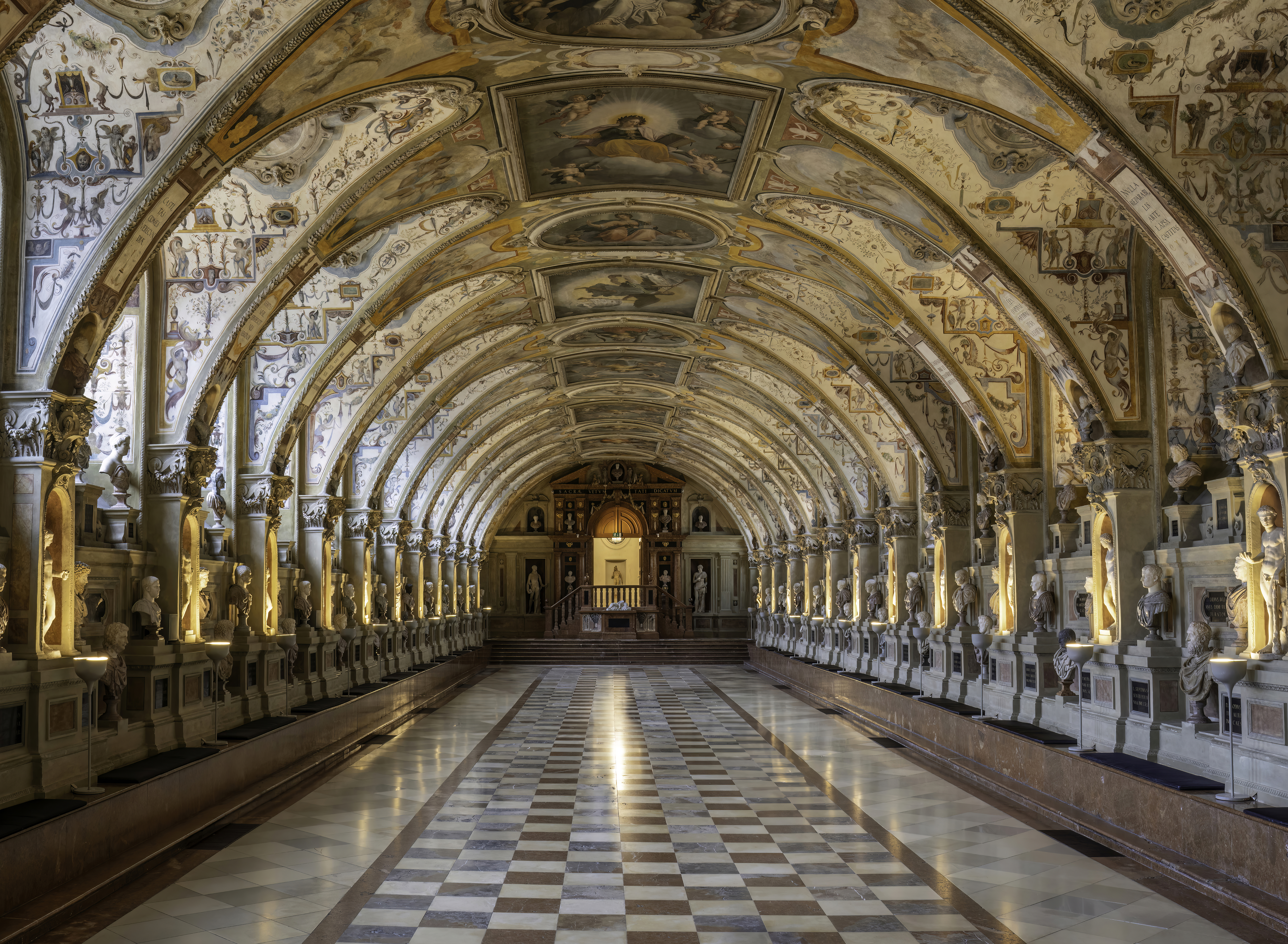
The Antiquarium, one of the oldest Renaissance vaults in Europe

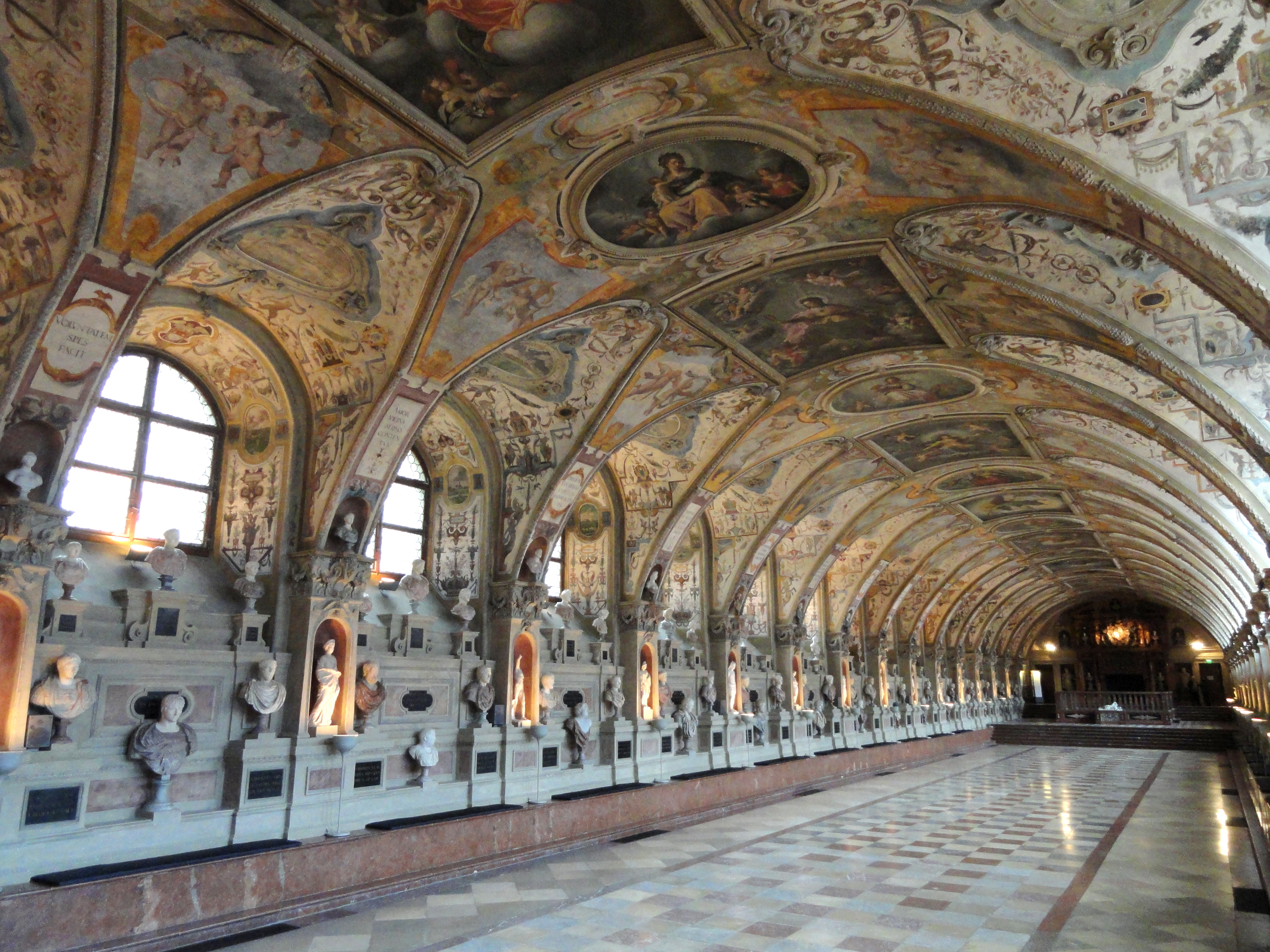
Side view of the figure collection

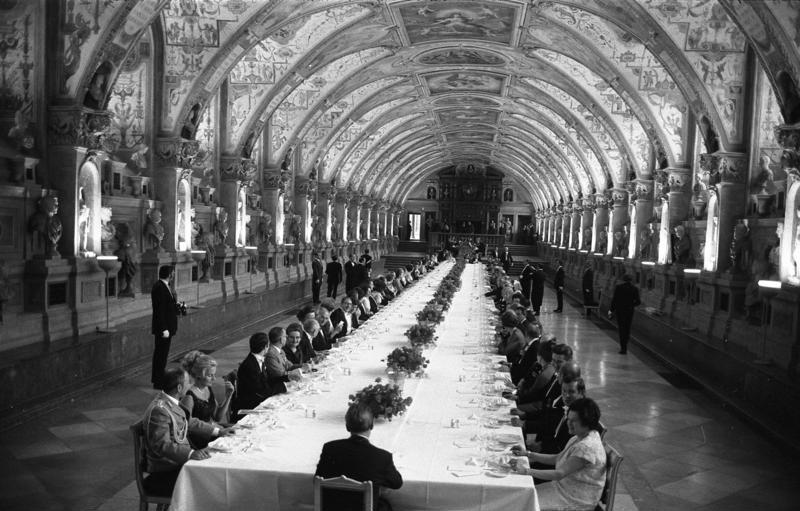
State visit of the Belgian royal couple on 29 April 1971

The Antiquarium was built from 1568 to house the ducal Collection of Classical Antiquities and Library as an extension of the Munich Residenz and was converted into a ballroom soon after. It is one of the most important surviving Renaissance collection buildings.

== Architecture ==
The ground floor hall of the Antiquarium, 69 metres long, is considered the largest Renaissance hall north of the Alps. The continuous barrel vault is hollowed out by the piercing caps of the 17 pairs of windows and is transparent. The rich painting by artists such as Hans Donauer the Elder, Alessandro Scalzi, called Padovano, Peter Candid and Antonio Viviani with 102 views of old Bavarian towns was completed only at around 1600.

== History ==
The residence in downtown Munich was the seat of the Bavarian dukes, electors and kings. Between 1568 and 1571 Duke Albrecht V built a free-standing, two-storey building there for his extensive sculpture collection (on the ground floor) and library (on the upper floor) based on ideas by Jacopo Strada from Mantua. In 1580-1584 Friedrich Sustris was commissioned to convert the ground floor hall of the Antiquarium into a festival and banquet hall, and the painting still preserved today was begun.

During the Second World War, the vault was destroyed by an explosive bomb in the middle. However, the moisture penetrating the vault in the following years was even more serious as it severely destroyed the ceiling painting. Following the closure of the gap in the vaults and the reroofing of the building wing, the Antiquarium was rebuilt under the direction of Otto Meitinger. The hall is again used for receptions by the Bavarian state government and for concerts. It is part of the Residenzmuseum.
