= Rudolf II, Holy Roman Emperor =

Holy Roman Emperor from 1576 to 1612

Rudolf II
- Imperator Romanorum
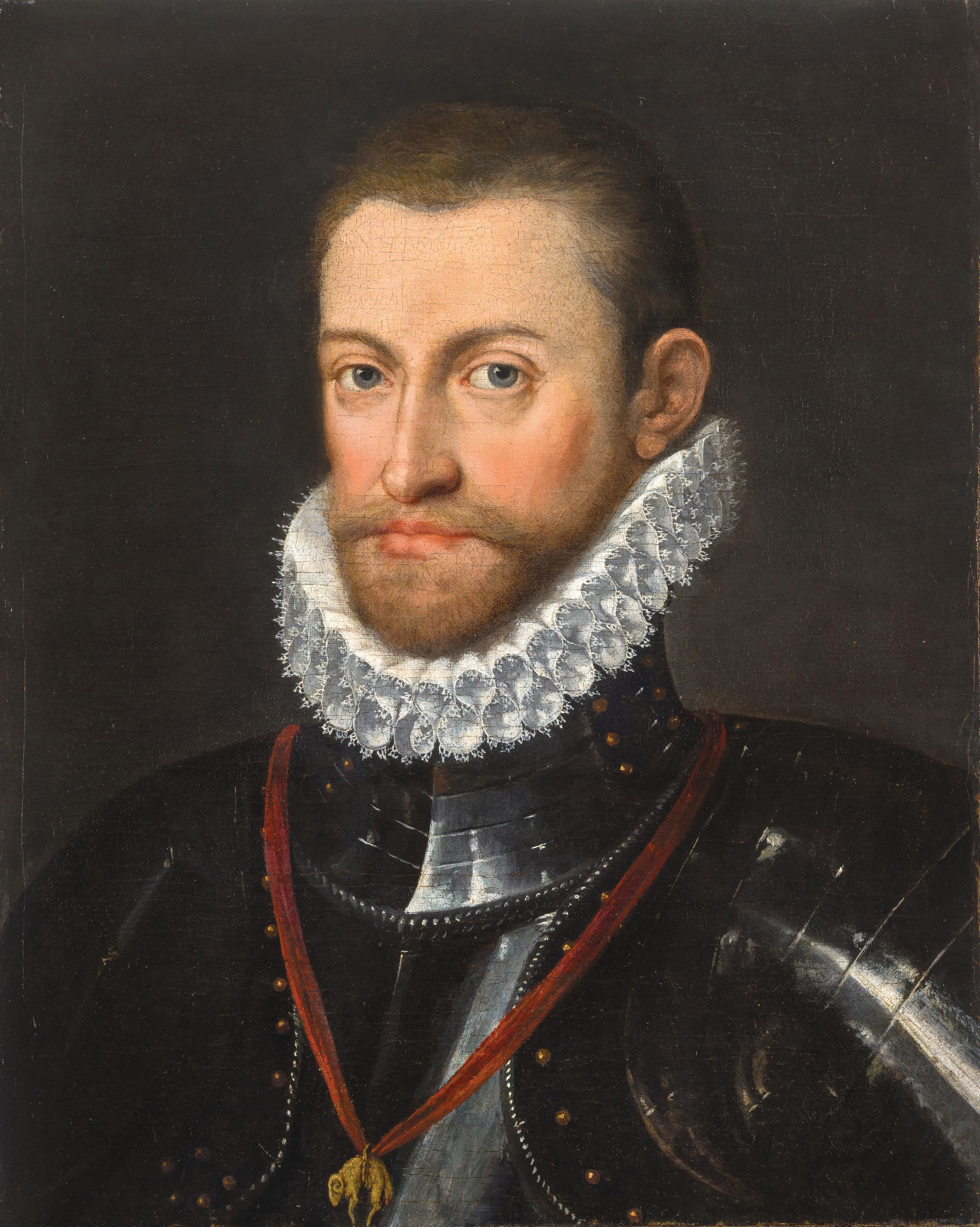
- Portrait by the circle of Martino Rota, c. 1576–1583

Holy Roman Emperor
- Reign: 12 October 1576 – 20 January 1612
- Proclamation: 1 November 1576, Regensburg Cathedral
- Predecessor: Maximilian II
- Successor: Matthias
- Born: 18 July 1552; Vienna, Archduchy of Austria, Holy Roman Empire
- Died: 20 January 1612 (aged 59); Prague, Kingdom of Bohemia, Holy Roman Empire
- Burial: St. Vitus Cathedral
- Issue more...: Don Julius Caesar d'Austria (ill.)
- House: Habsburg
- Father: Maximilian II, Holy Roman Emperor
- Mother: Maria of Austria

Rudolf II (18 July 1552 – 20 January 1612) was Holy Roman Emperor (1576–1612), King of Hungary and Croatia (as Rudolf I, 1572–1608), King of Bohemia (1575–1608/1611) and Archduke of Austria (1576–1608). He was a member of the House of Habsburg.

Rudolf's legacy has traditionally been viewed in three ways: an ineffectual ruler whose mistakes led directly to the Thirty Years' War; a great and influential patron of Northern Mannerist art; and an intellectual devotee of occult arts and learning which helped seed what would be called the Scientific Revolution. Determined to unify Christendom, he initiated the Long Turkish War (1593–1606) with the Ottoman Empire. Exhausted by war, his citizens in Hungary revolted in the Bocskai Uprising, which led to more authority being given to his brother Matthias. Under Rudolf's reign, there was a policy of tolerance towards Judaism.

== Early life ==
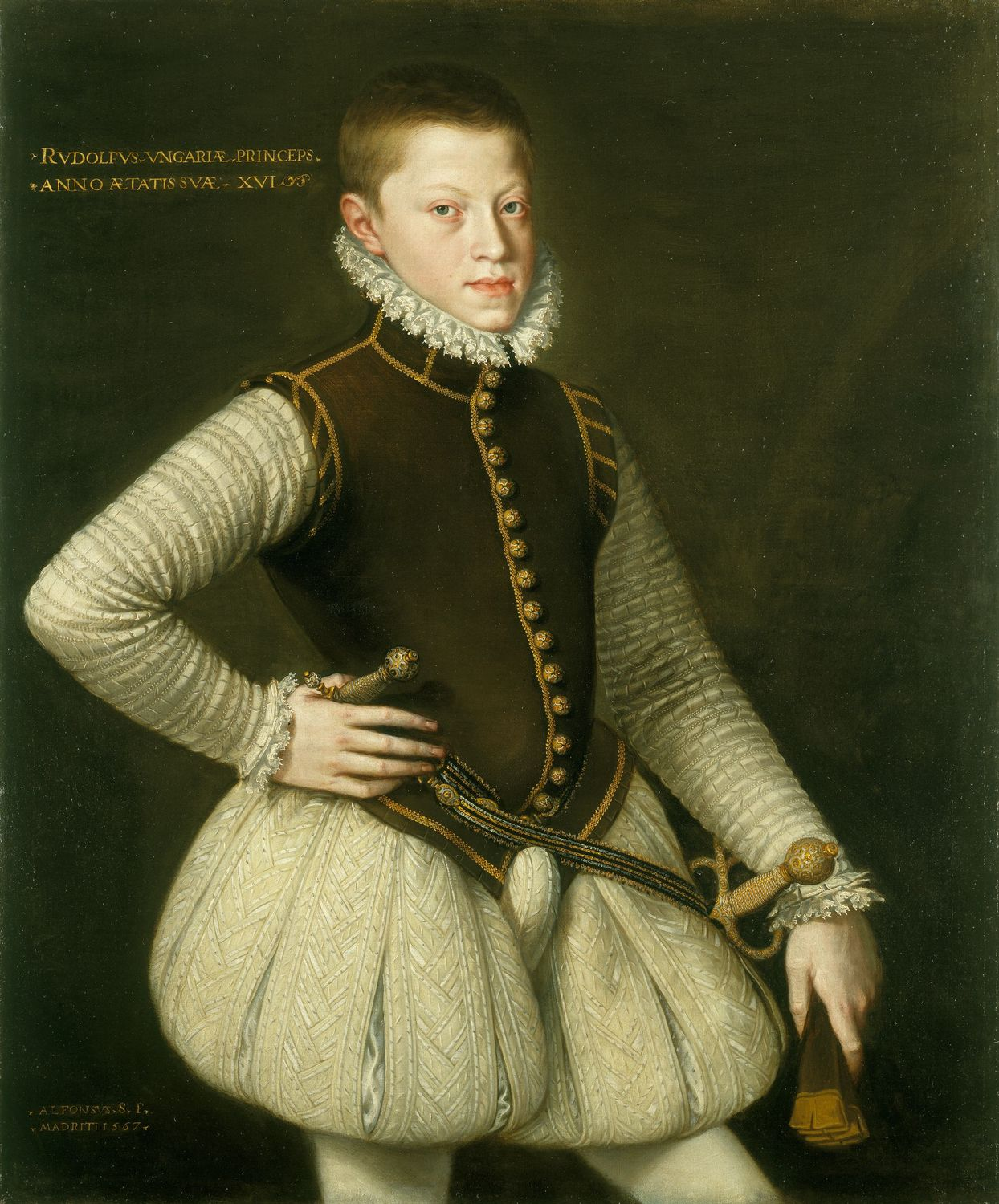
Archduke Rudolf, aged 16, painted by Alonso Sánchez Coello

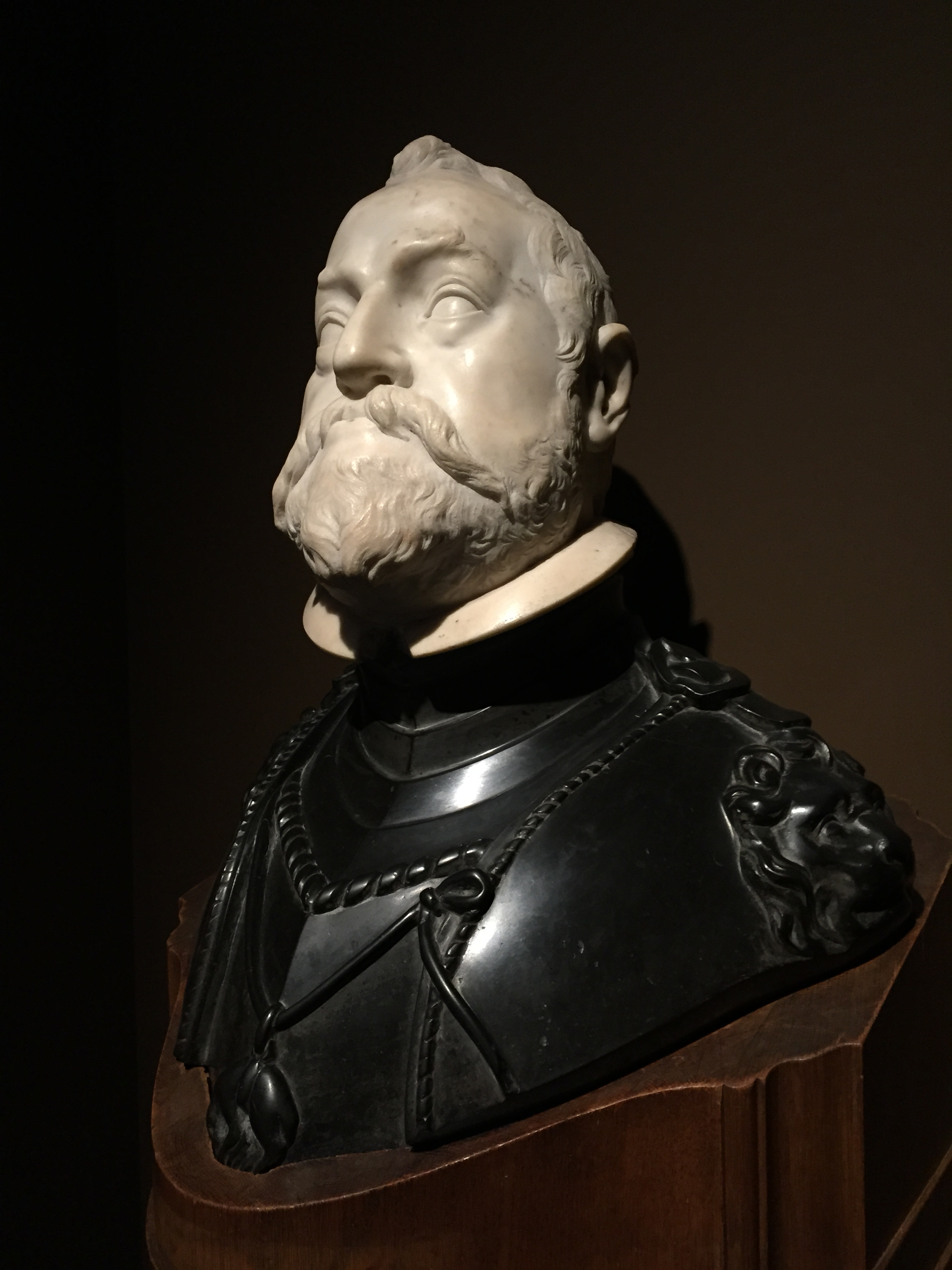
A portrait bust of Rudolf II in the collection of the Antwerp City Hall, Belgium

Rudolf was born in Vienna on 18 July 1552. He was the eldest son and successor of Maximilian II, Holy Roman Emperor, King of Bohemia, and King of Hungary and Croatia; his mother was the Spanish Princess Maria, a daughter of Charles V and Isabella of Portugal. He was the elder brother of Matthias, who was to succeed him as King of Bohemia and Holy Roman Emperor.

Rudolf spent eight formative years, from age 11 to 19 (1563–1571), in Spain, at the court of his maternal uncle Philip II of Spain, together with his younger brother Ernest, future governor of the Low Countries.

After his return to Vienna, his father was concerned about Rudolf's aloof and stiff manner, typical of the more conservative Spanish court, rather than the more relaxed and open Austrian court, but his Spanish mother saw in him courtliness and refinement. In the years following his return to Vienna, Rudolf was crowned King of Hungary (1572), King of Bohemia and King of the Romans (1575) when his father was still alive.

For the rest of his life, Rudolf would remain reserved, secretive, and largely a recluse who did not like to travel or even partake in the daily affairs of the state.

He was more intrigued by occult learning, such as astrology and alchemy, which were mainstream in the Renaissance period, and had a wide variety of personal hobbies, such as horses, clocks, collecting rarities, and being a patron of the arts. He suffered from periodic bouts of "melancholy" (depression), which was common in the Habsburg line. These became worse with age and were manifested by a withdrawal from the world and its affairs into his private interests.

== Personal life ==
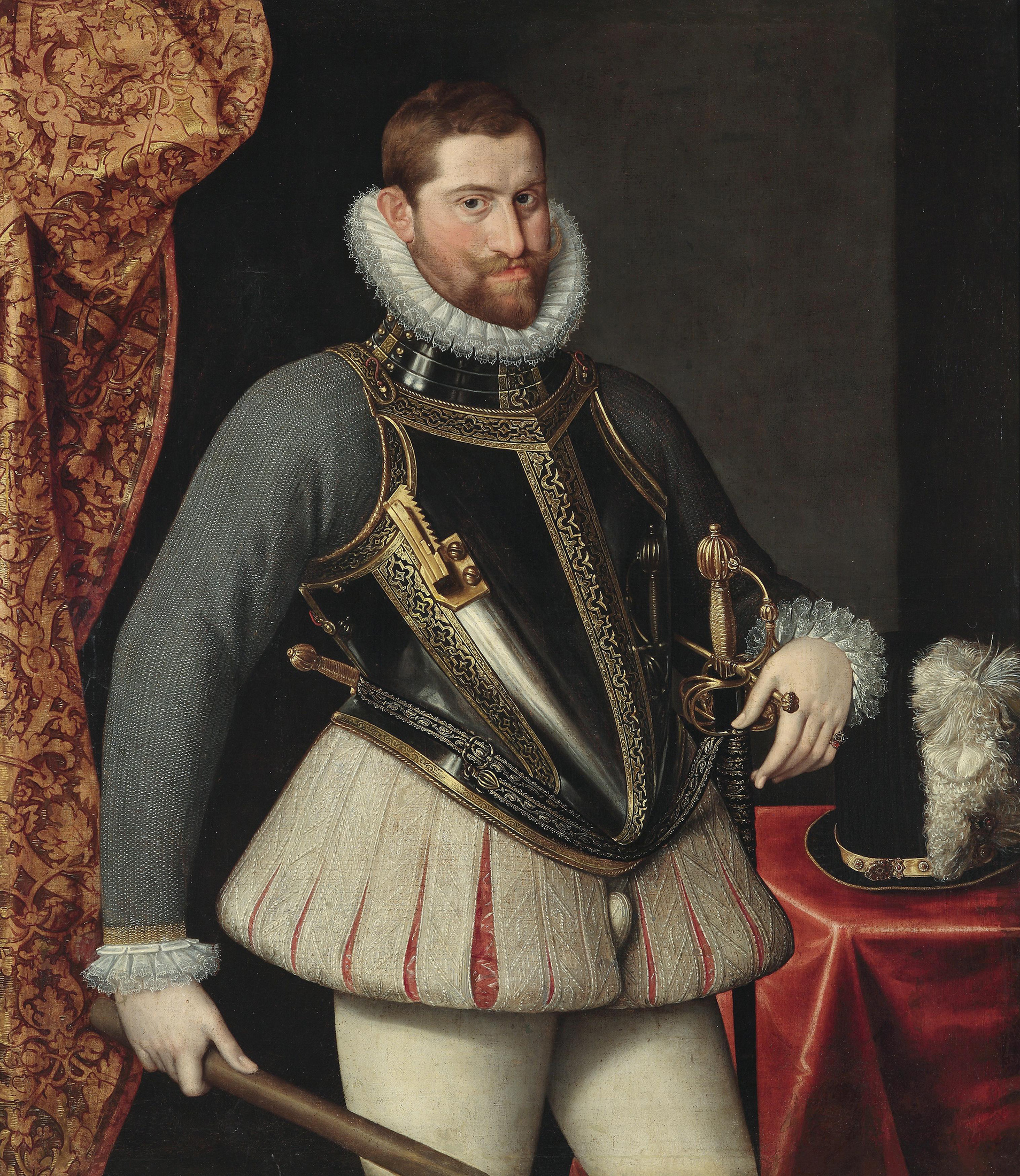
Portrait of Rudolf II by Lucas van Valckenborch, c. 1580

Like Elizabeth I of England, whose birth was 19 years before his, Rudolf dangled himself as a prize in a string of diplomatic negotiations for marriages, but never in fact married. Rudolf was known to have had a succession of affairs with women, some of whom claimed to have been impregnated by him. He had several illegitimate children by his mistress Catherina Strada. Their eldest son, Don Julius Caesar d'Austria, was likely born between 1584 and 1586 and received an education and opportunities for political and social prominence from his father. Another famous child was Karolina (1591–1662), Princess of Cantecroix, mother-in-law of Béatrix de Cusance, later Duchess of Lorraine as the second wife of Charles IV, Duke of Lorraine.

During his periods of self-imposed isolation, Rudolf reportedly had affairs with his Obersthofmeister, Wolfgang Siegmund Rumpf vom Wullroß (1536–1606), and a series of valets. One of them, the Jewish Philipp Lang von Langenfels (1560–1609), influenced him for years and was hated by those seeking favours with the emperor.

Rudolf succeeded his father, Maximilian II, on 12 October 1576. In 1583, he moved the court to Prague.

In 1607, Rudolf sent Julius to live in Český Krumlov Castle, in Bohemia, in what is now the Czech Republic, a castle that Rudolf had acquired from Peter Vok of Rosenberg, the last member of the House of Rosenberg, who had fallen into financial ruin. Julius lived at Český Krumlov in 1608, when he reportedly abused and murdered the daughter of a local barber, who had been living in the castle, and then disfigured her body. Rudolf condemned his son's act and suggested that he should be imprisoned for the rest of his life.

However, Julius died in 1609 after he had shown signs of schizophrenia, refused to bathe and lived in squalor. His death was apparently caused by an ulcer that ruptured.

Many artworks commissioned by Rudolf are unusually erotic. The emperor was the subject of a whispering campaign by his enemies in his family and the Catholic Church in the years before he was deposed. Sexual allegations might well have formed a part of the campaign against him.

== Reign ==
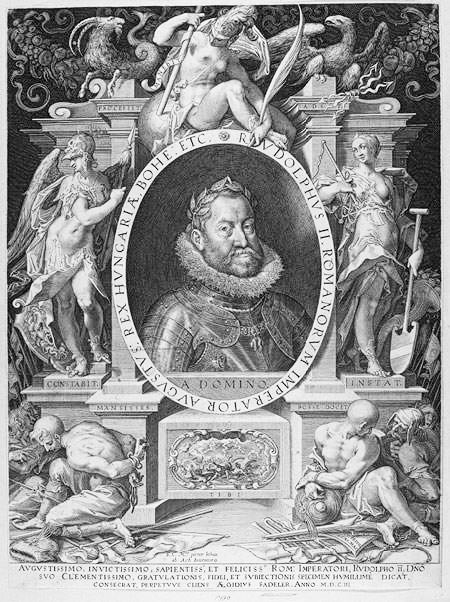
Engraving by Aegidius Sadeler (1603)

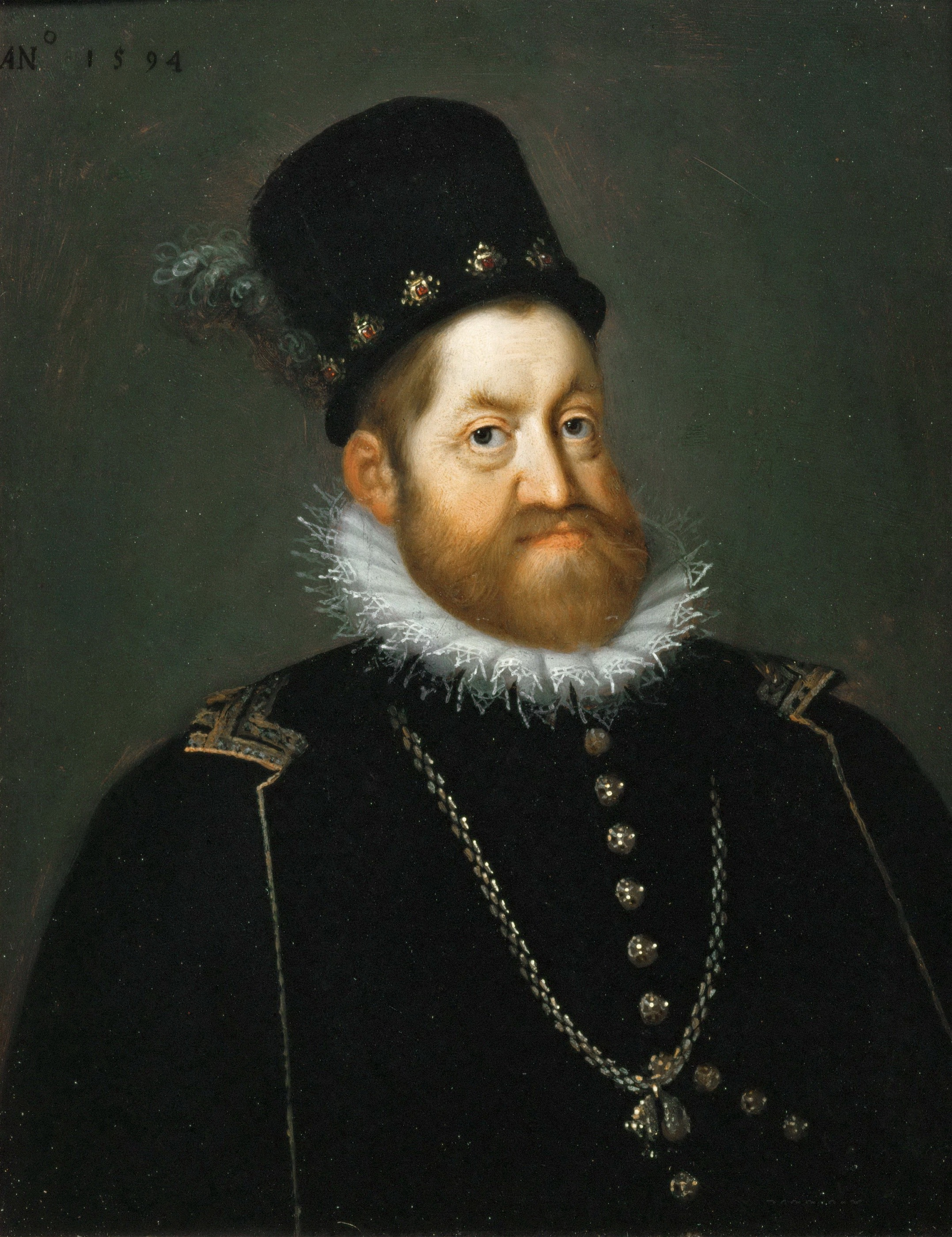
Portrait by Joseph Heintz the Elder, 1594

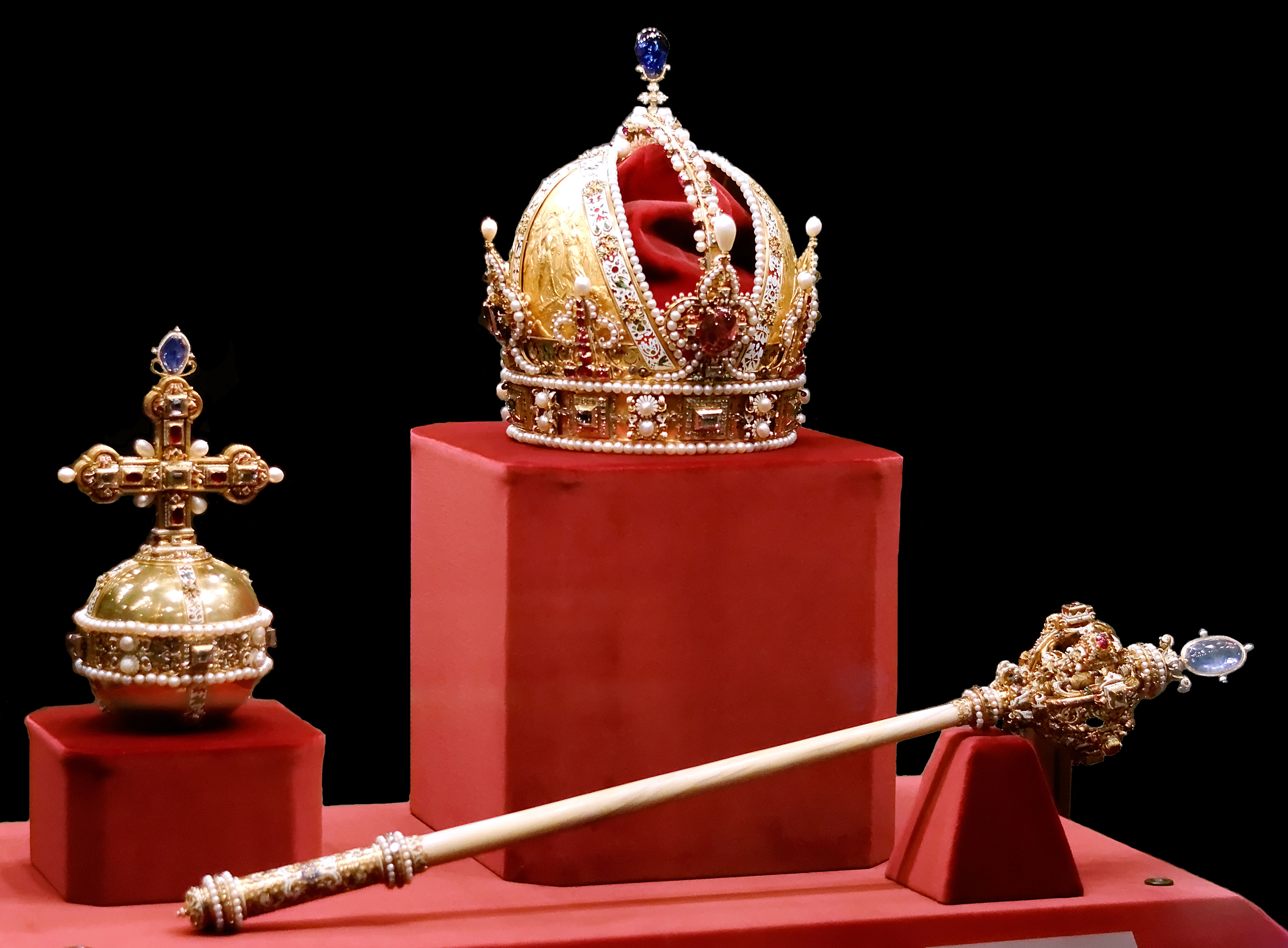
Globus cruciger, crown and scepter of Rudolf II

Historians have traditionally blamed Rudolf's preoccupation with the arts, occult sciences and other personal interests for the political disasters of his reign. More recent historians have re-evaluated that view and see his patronage of the arts and occult sciences as a triumph and key part of the Renaissance, and his political failures as a legitimate attempt to create a unified Christian empire that was undermined by the realities of religious, political, and intellectual disintegrations of the time.

Although raised in his uncle Philip II's Catholic court in Spain, Rudolf was tolerant of Protestantism and other religions, including Judaism. Rudolf's tolerant policy towards the Jews would see Jewish cultural life flourishing and their population increasing under his reign.

He largely withdrew from Catholic observances and even in death refused the last sacramental rites. He had little attachment to Protestants either, except as a counter-weight to papal policies. He put his primary support behind conciliarists, irenicists and humanists. When the papacy instigated the Counter-Reformation by using agents sent to his court, Rudolf backed those whom he thought were the most neutral in the debate, either by not taking a side or by trying to promote restraint. This led to political chaos and threatened to provoke civil war.

His conflict with the Ottoman Empire was the final cause of his undoing. Unwilling to compromise with the Ottomans and stubbornly determined that he could unify all of Christendom with a new crusade, he started a long and indecisive war against the Ottomans in 1593. The war lasted until 1606 and is known as the "Long Turkish War".

By 1604, his Hungarian subjects were exhausted by the war and revolted, led by Stephen Bocskai (Bocskai uprising). In 1605, Rudolf was forced by his other family members to cede control of Hungarian affairs to his younger brother, Archduke Matthias. By 1606, Matthias had forged a difficult peace with the Hungarian rebels (Peace of Vienna) and the Ottomans (Peace of Zsitvatorok).

Rudolf was angry with Matthias's concessions and saw them as giving away too much to further his hold on power. That made Rudolf prepare to start a new war against the Ottomans, but Matthias rallied support from the disaffected Hungarians and forced Rudolf to cede the crowns of Hungary, Austria and Moravia to him. Meanwhile, the Bohemian Protestants demanded greater religious liberty, which Rudolf granted in the Letter of Majesty in 1609. Bohemians continued to press for further freedoms, and Rudolf attempted to suppress the Protestant estates with the help of his cousin, Leopold V, Bishop of Passau, whose troops entered Bohemia in 1611.

Bohemian Protestants then appealed to Matthias for help. His army held Rudolf prisoner in his castle in Prague until 1611, when Rudolf ceded the crown of Bohemia, as well, to his brother.

== Death ==
Sarcophagus of Rudolf II

Rudolf died in January 1612, nine months after he had been stripped of all effective power by his younger brother, except the empty title of Holy Roman Emperor, to which Matthias was elected in June 1612. In May 1618, with the event known as the Defenestration of Prague, the Protestant Bohemians, in defence of the rights granted them in the Letter of Majesty, threw imperial officials out of the window and thus the Thirty Years' War (1618–1648) started.

== Art collecting and patronage ==
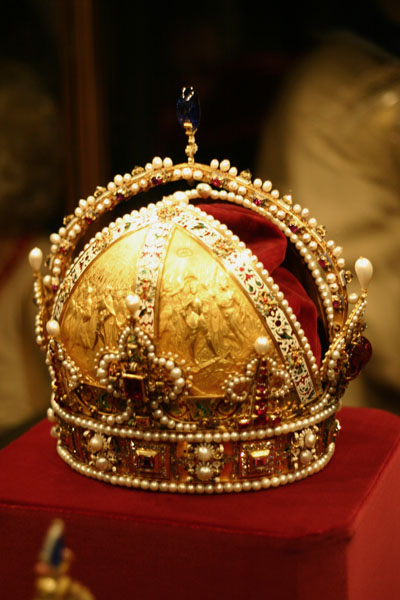
The Crown of Rudolf II later became the Austrian Empire's imperial crown.

Rudolph as the Roman vegetation god Vertumnus, in Vertumnus by Giuseppe Arcimboldo, 1591.

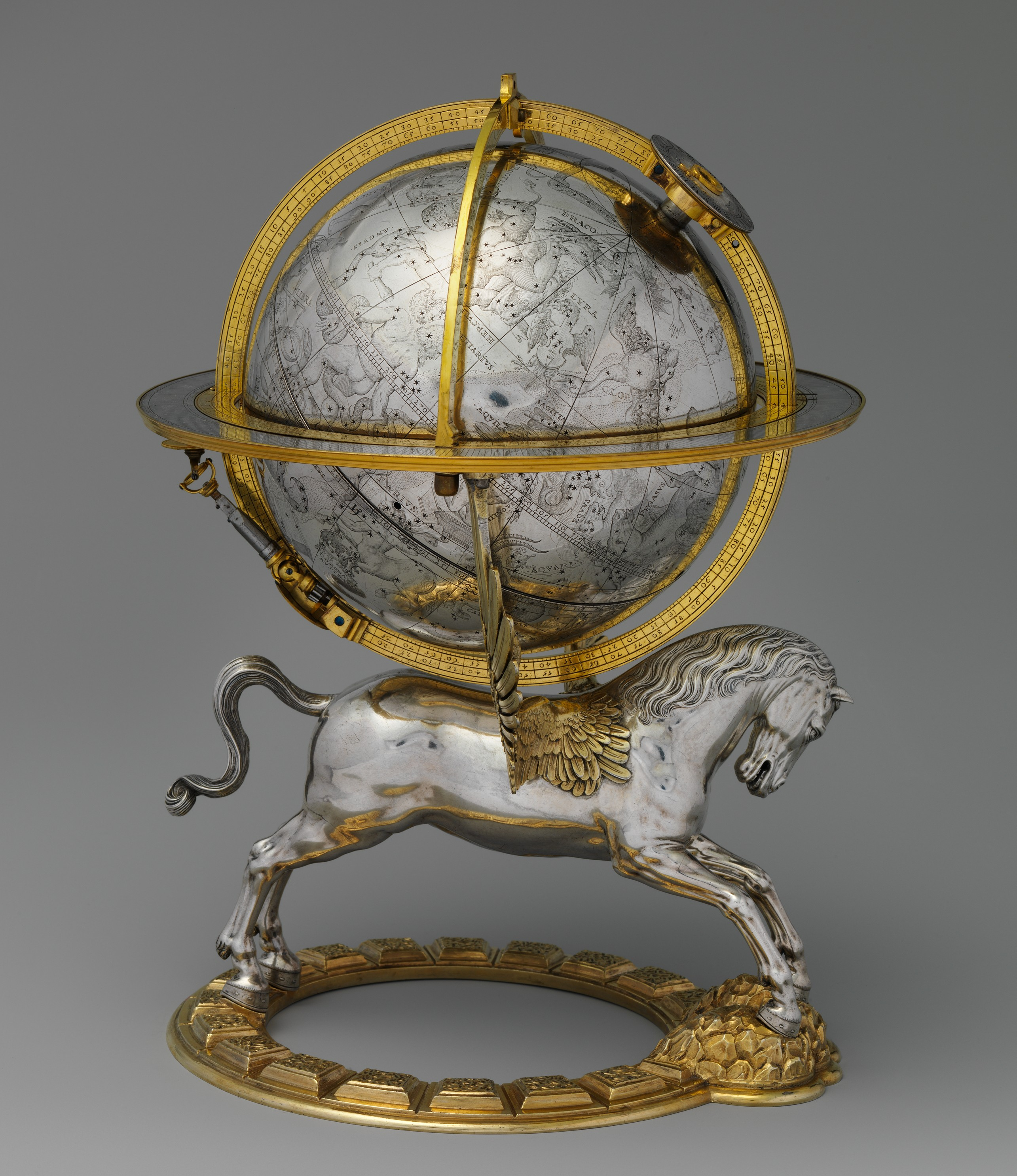
Celestial globe with clockwork, made for the Kunstkammer of Rudolf II, 1579

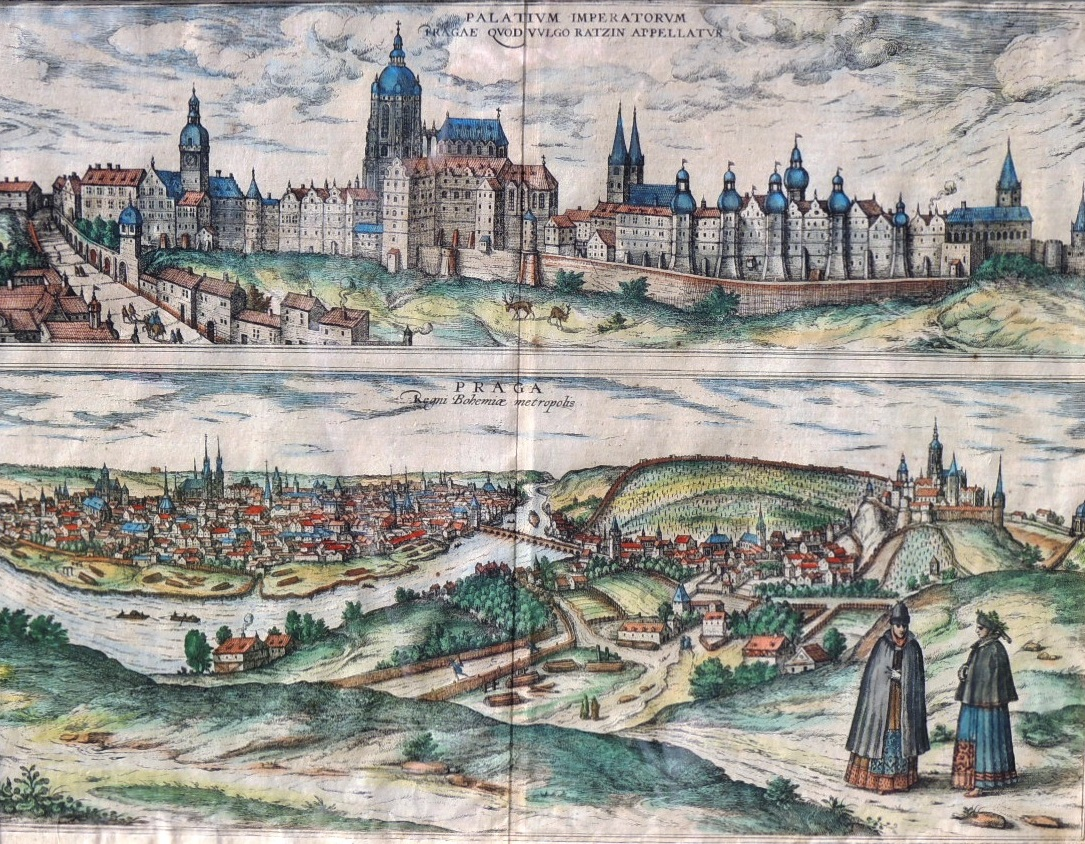
Prague Castle in 1595 by Joris Hoefnagel

Rudolf moved the Habsburg capital from Vienna to Prague in 1583. Rudolf loved collecting paintings and was often reported to sit and stare in rapture at a new work for hours on end. He spared no expense in acquiring great masterworks, such as those of Albrecht Dürer and Pieter Bruegel the Elder. Rudolf's collections were the most impressive in the Europe of his day. He was patron to some of the finest contemporary artists, who mainly produced new works in the Northern Mannerist style, such as Bartholomeus Spranger, Hans von Aachen, Giambologna, Giuseppe Arcimboldo, Aegidius Sadeler, Roelant Savery, Joris Hoefnagel, and Adrian de Vries, and commissioned works from Italian artists like Paolo Veronese.

Rudolf's love of collecting for the kunstkammer extended to decorative objects of all kinds, natural artefacts, and mechanical moving devices. In addition, his court included artists who contributed ceremonial swords, musical instruments, clocks, waterworks, astrolabes, compasses, telescopes and other scientific instruments. Rudolf also attracted some of the best scientific instrument makers of the time, such as Jost Bürgi, Erasmus Habermel and Hans Christoph Schissler, who had direct contact with the court astronomers and through the financial support of the court were economically independent to develop scientific instruments and manufacturing techniques.

Rudolf patronised astronomers Tycho Brahe and Johannes Kepler, who both attended his court. Brahe, who had spent much of his life making observations of stars and planets that were more accurate than any previous observations, directed Kepler to work on the planet Mars. In doing so, Kepler found that in order to fit the observations to the required accuracy, it was necessary to assume that each planet orbits the sun in an ellipse with the sun at one focus, sweeping out equal areas in equal times, resulting in Kepler's laws of planetary motion. It was Rudolf's patronage of the two astronomers that made this possible, as Kepler recognised when he eventually published the Rudolphine Tables.

The poet Elizabeth Jane Weston, a writer of Renaissance Latin poetry, published numerous odes to him while appealing for him to release her stepfather's assets.

Rudolf kept a menagerie of exotic animals, botanical gardens, and Europe's most extensive "cabinet of curiosities" incorporating "the three kingdoms of nature and the works of man". It was housed at Prague Castle, where between 1587 and 1605 he built the northern wing to house his growing collections. A lion and a tiger were allowed to roam the castle, as is documented by the account books, which record compensation paid to survivors of attacks or to family members of victims.

The Codex Gigas was one of Rudolf's possessions. He was also alleged, by a single piece of hearsay, to have owned the Voynich manuscript, a codex whose author, purpose, language and script, and posited cypher remain unidentified to this day. In a letter written in 1665, Johannes Marcus Marci claims to have heard that Rudolf acquired the manuscript for 600 gold ducats at some unspecified time. No evidence in support of this assertion has ever been discovered.

As was typical of the time, Rudolf II had a portrait painted in the studio of the renowned Alonso Sánchez Coello. Completed in 1567, the portrait depicted Rudolf II at the age of 15. This painting can be seen at the Lobkowicz Palace in the Rozmberk room.

By 1597, Rudolf's collections occupied three rooms of the incomplete northern wing. When the building was completed in 1605, the collection was moved to the dedicated Kunstkammer. Naturalia (minerals and gemstones) were arranged in a 37-cabinet display that had three vaulted chambers in front, each about 5.5 m wide by 3 m high and 60 m long, connected to a main chamber 33 m long. Large uncut gemstones were held in strong boxes.

Apart from the fantastic nature of the objects, the aesthetics of their arrangement and presentation played an important role in highlighting the harmonious expression of divine order and the analogy of a micro-macrocosm in art, nature, and the world.

Rudolf's kunstkammer was not a typical "cabinet of curiosities", a haphazard collection of unrelated specimens. Rather, the Rudolfine kunstkammer was systematically arranged in an encyclopaedic fashion. In addition, Rudolf employed his court gemologist and physician Anselmus de Boodt (1550–1632), to curate the collection. Anselmus was an avid mineral collector and travelled widely on collecting trips to the mining regions of Germany, Bohemia and Silesia, often accompanied by his Bohemian naturalist friend, Thaddaeus Hagecius. Between 1607 and 1611, Anselmus catalogued the kunstkammer and in 1609 published Gemmarum et Lapidum, the finest gemological treatise and encyclopedia ever written for this time.

Rudolf's successors did not appreciate the collection, and the kunstkammer gradually fell into disarray. Some 50 years after its establishment, most of the collection was packed into wooden crates and moved to Vienna. Most of the paintings that reached Vienna remain there, in the Kunsthistorisches Museum, with other pieces in the Secular Treasury and other museums. The collection remaining at Prague was looted during the last year of the Thirty Years' War by Swedish troops who sacked Prague Castle on 26 July 1648 and took the best of the paintings, many of which later passed to the Orléans Collection after the death of Christina of Sweden. In 1782, the remainder of the collection was sold piecemeal to private parties by Joseph II, Holy Roman Emperor. One of the surviving items from the kunstkammer is a "fine chair" that was looted by the Swedes in 1648 and now owned by the Earl of Radnor at Longford Castle in Britain, and others survive in museums.

== Occultism ==
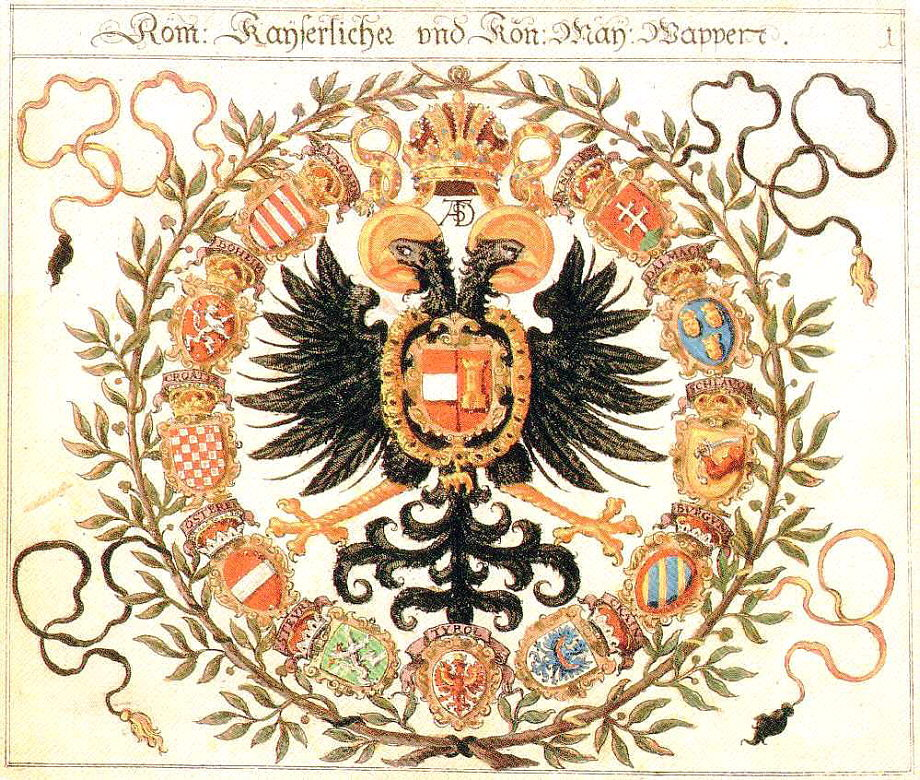
Great coat of arms, 1605

Astrology and alchemy were regarded as mainstream scientific fields in Renaissance Prague, and Rudolf was a firm devotee of both. His lifelong quest was to find the philosopher's stone, and Rudolf spared no expense in bringing Europe's best alchemists to court, such as Edward Kelley and John Dee. Rudolf even performed his own experiments in a private alchemy laboratory. When Rudolf was a prince, Nostradamus prepared a horoscope, which was dedicated to him as "Prince and King". In the 1590s, Michael Sendivogius was active at Rudolph's court.

Rudolf gave Prague a mystical reputation that persists in part to this day, with Alchemists' Alley, on the grounds of Prague Castle, being a popular visiting place and tourist attraction. He was also a patron of the occult sciences. That and his practice of tolerance towards Jews caused during his reign the legend of the Golem of Prague to be established.

== Issue ==
Rudolf had a relationship with the royal mistress Kateřina Stradová (also known as Anna Marie Stradová, or Catherina Strada, c. 1568-1629), with whom he had six children:

- Don Julius Caesar d'Austria
- Matyáš d'Austria
- Carlos d'Austria
- Karolina d'Austria
- Dorothea d'Austria
- Alžběta d'Austria

== Titles ==
The full titulature of Rudolf after he inherited the Holy Roman Empire and the vast realms of Central and Eastern Europe went as follows:

His Imperial and Royal Majesty, Rudolf II, by the Grace of God elected Holy Roman Emperor, forever Augustus, King of Germany, King of Hungary, of Bohemia, of Dalmatia, of Croatia, of Slavonia, of Galicia, of Lodomeria, of Italy, of Cumania, of Bulgaria, of Serbia, of Rama, of Romania, etc.; Archduke of Austria; Duke of Burgundy, of Styria, of Carinthia and of Carniola; Grand Prince of Transylvania; Margrave of Moravia; Duke of Brabant, of Limburg, of Luxemburg, of Guelders, of Württemberg, of Upper and Lower Silesia, of Milan, of Mantua, of Parma, of Piacenza, of Guastalla, of Auschwitz, of Zator and of Teck; Prince of Swabia; Princely Count of Habsburg, of Flanders, of Tyrol, of Hainault, of Kyburg, of Gorizia, of Gradisca, of Namur; Lord of the Wendish Mark and of Mechlin; Landgrave of Alsace; Duke of Lorraine and Bar, Grand Duke of Tuscany; Marquess of the Holy Roman Empire, Burgovia, the Enns, the Upper and Lower Lusatia, Lord of the Marquisate of Slavonia, of Port Naon and Salines, etc.

== Ancestors ==
Ancestors of Rudolf II, Holy Roman Emperor

8. Philip I of Castile (= 12)
4. Ferdinand I, Holy Roman Emperor
9. Joanna of Castile (= 13)
2. Maximilian II, Holy Roman Emperor
10. Vladislas II of Bohemia and Hungary
5. Anne of Bohemia and Hungary
11. Anne of Foix
1. Rudolf II, Holy Roman Emperor
12. Philip I of Castile (= 8)
6. Charles V, Holy Roman Emperor
13. Joanna of Castile (= 9)
3. Maria of Austria
14. Manuel I of Portugal
7. Isabella of Portugal
15. Maria of Aragon

== Male-line family tree ==
House of Habsburg

Original line
Albert; Count of Habsburg c. 1188–1239
Rudolf I of Germany c. 1218–1291
Albert I of Germany; 1255–1308	Hartmann; 1263–1281	Rudolf II; Duke of Austria; 1270–1290
Rudolf I of Bohemia; 1281–1307	Frederick the Fair c. 1289–1330	Leopold I Duke of Austria; 1290–1326	Albert II; Duke of Austria; 1298–1358	Henry the Friendly; 1299–1327	Otto; Duke of Austria; 1301–1339	John; Parricida c. 1290–1312/1313
Albertinian line	Leopoldian line
Rudolf IV; Duke of Austria; 1339–1365	Frederick III; 1347–1362	Albert III; Duke of Austria; 1349–1395	Leopold III; Duke of Austria; 1351–1386	Frederick II; Duke of Austria; 1327–1344	Leopold II; Duke of Austria; 1328–1344
Albert IV; Duke of Austria; 1377–1404	William; Duke of Austria c. 1370–1406	Leopold IV; Duke of Austria; 1371–1411	Ernest; Duke of Austria; 1377–1424	Frederick IV; Duke of Austria; 1382–1439
Albert II of Germany; 1397–1439	Frederick III; HRE; 1415–1493	Albert VI; Archduke of Austria; 1418–1463	Sigismund; Archduke of Austria; 1427–1496
Ladislaus the Posthumous; 1440–1457	Maximilian I HRE; 1459–1519
Philip I of Castile; 1478–1506
Spanish / Iberian line	Austrian / HRE line
Charles V HRE; 1500–1558	Ferdinand I HRE; 1503–1564
Philip II of Spain; 1527–1598	Maximilian II; HRE; 1527–1576	Ferdinand II; Archduke of Austria; 1529–1595	Charles II; Archduke of Austria; 1540–1590
Carlos; Prince of Asturias; 1545–1568	Philip III of Spain; 1578–1621	Rudolf II; HRE; 1552–1612	Ernest of Austria; 1553–1595	Matthias; HRE; 1557–1619	Maximilian III; Archduke of Austria; 1558–1618	Albert VII; Archduke of Austria; 1559–1621	Wenceslaus; Archduke of Austria; 1561–1578	Andrew; Margrave of Burgau; 1558–1600	Charles; Margrave of Burgau; 1560–1618	Ferdinand II; HRE; 1578–1637	Maximilian Ernest of Austria; 1583–1616	Leopold V Archduke of Austria; 1586–1632	Charles of Austria; 1590–1624
Philip IV of Spain; 1605–1665	Charles of Austria; 1607–1632	Ferdinand of Austria; 1609–1641	John-Charles of Austria; 1605–1619	Ferdinand III; HRE; 1608–1657	Leopold Wilhelm of Austria; 1614–1662	Ferdinand Charles; Archduke of Austria; 1628–1662	Sigismund Francis; Archduke of Austria; 1630–1665
Balthasar Charles; Prince of Asturias; 1629–1646	Charles II of Spain; 1661–1700	Ferdinand IV; King of the Romans; 1633–1654	Leopold I HRE; 1640–1705	Charles Joseph of Austria; 1649–1664
Joseph I HRE; 1678–1711	Charles VI; HRE; 1685–1740
Lorraine
Maria Theresa; HRE; 1740–1780	Francis I HRE; 1745–1765
Habsburg-Lorraine
Joseph II; HRE; 1765–1790	Leopold II; HRE; 1790–1792
Francis II; HRE; 1792–1806

== See also ==
- History of Austria
- Kings of Germany family tree; he was related to every other king of Germany
- Mineral collecting – Rudolf II was the 16th century's most famous mineral collector; his collections were curated by Anselmus de Boodt
- Moldavian Magnate Wars for the background on southern wars (with Ottoman Turkey and its allies)
- Vespasiano I Gonzaga, a friend of Rudolf who built a Renaissance "ideal city" in Sabbioneta, Italy

== Bibliography ==
- Bolton, Henry Carrington (1904). The Follies of Science at the Court of Rudolph II, 1576–1612. Milwaukee: Pharmaceutical Review Publishing Co. Digital edition by the University and State Library Düsseldorf.
- Evans, R. J. W. (1973). Rudolf II and His World: A Study in Intellectual History, 1576–1612. Clarendon Press, 2nd ed., 1984.
- Fidler, Richard (2020). "Chapter 4: The Great Work: 1550-1619". The Golden Maze: A Biography of Prague. Australia: ABC Books. pp. 132–183. ISBN 9780733335266.
- Eliška Fučíková et al., eds. (1997). Rudolf II and Prague: The Court and the City. Thames & Hudson. ISBN 978-0500237373.
- Howard Hotson. "Rudolf II", in Encyclopedia of the Renaissance, ed. Paul Grendler. Vol. 5. ISBN 0-684-80514-6.
- Kaufmann, Thomas DaCosta (1988). The School of Prague: Painting at the Court of Rudolf II. Chicago: University of Chicago Press. ISBN 9780226427270.
- Kaufmann, Thomas DaCosta (2025). Rudolf II: The Life and Legend of the Mad Emperor. London: Reaktion Books Ltd. ISBN 978 1 83639 061 9.
- Philippe Malgouyres (2025). La Science de l'émerveillement: Artistes et intellectuels à la cour de Rodolphe II (1552–1612). Paris: Mare & Martin.
- Marshall, Peter (2006). The Magic Circle of Rudolf II: Alchemy and Astrology in Renaissance Prague. ISBN 0-8027-1551-6. Also published as The Theatre of the World: Alchemy, Astrology and Magic in Renaissance Prague (in the UK, ISBN 0-436-20521-1; in Canada, ISBN 0-7710-5690-7); and in paperback as The Mercurial Emperor: The Magic Circle of Rudolf II in Renaissance Prague (2007). ISBN 978-1-84413-537-0.
- Rady, Martyn (2020). Chapter 10 "Rudolf II and the Alchemists of Prague". The Habsburgs: To Rule the World. New York: Basic Books. pp. 107-115. ISBN 978-1-5416-4450-2.
- Trevor-Roper, Hugh (1976). Princes and Artists, Patronage and Ideology at Four Habsburg Courts 1517–1633. London: Thames & Hudson. ISBN 0-500-23232-6.
- Rowse, A. L. (1977). Homosexuals in History: Ambivalence in Society, Literature and the Arts. Macmillan Publishers. ISBN 0-02-605620-8.

Rudolf II, Holy Roman Emperor House of Habsburg Born: 18 July 1552 Died: 20 January 1612
Regnal titles
Preceded by Maximilian II, Holy Roman Emperor	King of Bohemia; 1576–1611	Succeeded by Matthias, Holy Roman Emperor
Preceded by Maximilian II, Holy Roman Emperor	King of Hungary and Croatia; Archduke of Austria; Margrave of Moravia; 1576–1608	Succeeded by Matthias, Holy Roman Emperor
Preceded by Maximilian II, Holy Roman Emperor	King of the Romans; King in Germany; 1575–1612	Succeeded by Matthias, Holy Roman Emperor
Preceded by Maximilian II, Holy Roman Emperor	Holy Roman Emperor; 1576–1612	Succeeded by Matthias, Holy Roman Emperor
Preceded by Iacopo VII Appiani	Prince of Piombino; 1603–1611	Succeeded by Isabella Appiani
