= Albert V of Bavaria =

Duke of Bavaria from 1550 to 1579

Albert V
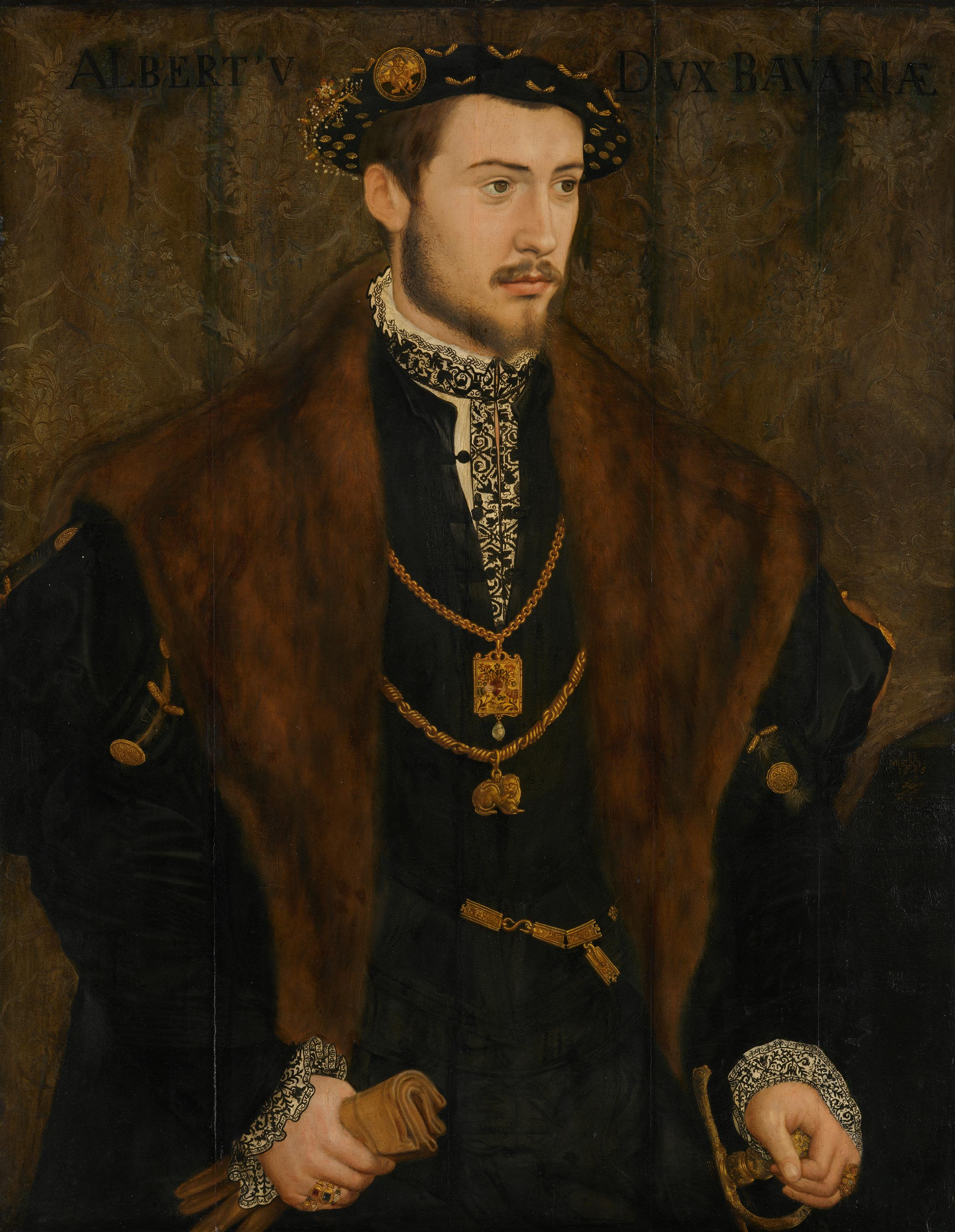
- Portrait by Hans Mielich, 1545

Duke of Bavaria
- Reign: 7 March 1550 – 24 October 1579
- Predecessor: William IV
- Successor: William V
- Born: 29 February 1528; Munich
- Died: 24 October 1579 (aged 51); Munich
- Burial: Munich Frauenkirche
- Spouse: Archduchess Anna of Austria (m. 1546)
- Issue more...: William V, Duke of Bavaria; Ferdinand; Maria Anna, Archduchess of Austria; Maximiliana Maria of Bavaria; Ernest of Bavaria
- House: House of Wittelsbach
- Father: William IV, Duke of Bavaria
- Mother: Marie of Baden-Sponheim
- Religion: Roman Catholicism

Albert V (German: Albrecht V.) (29 February 1528 – 24 October 1579) was Duke of Bavaria from 1550 until his death. He was born in Munich to William IV and Maria Jacobäa of Baden.

== Early life ==
Albert was educated at Ingolstadt by Catholic teachers. On 4 July 1546 he married Anna of Austria, a daughter of Ferdinand I, Holy Roman Emperor and Anna of Bohemia and Hungary (1503–1547), daughter of King Ladislaus II of Bohemia and Hungary and his wife Anne de Foix. The union was designed to end the political rivalry between Austria and Bavaria. In 1550, Albert succeeded his father as duke of Bavaria.

== Political activity ==
Albert was now free to devote himself to the task of establishing Catholic conformity in his dominions. A strict Catholic by upbringing, Albert was a leader of the German Counter-Reformation. Incapable by nature of passionate adherence to any religious principle, and given rather to a life of idleness and pleasure, he pursued the work of repression because he was convinced that the cause of Catholicism was inseparably connected with the fortunes of the house of Wittelsbach. He took little direct share in the affairs of government, nevertheless, and easily lent himself to the plans of his advisers, among whom during the early part of his reign were two sincere Catholics, Georg Stockhammer and Wiguleus Hundt. The latter took an important part in the events leading up to the Peace of Passau (1552) and the Peace of Augsburg (1555).

Duke Albert made strenuous efforts to procure for his son, Ernest of Bavaria, election as Archbishop-elector of Cologne. These efforts would not pay off until after Albert's death; however, a member of the Wittelsbach house of Bavaria would be Archbishop of Cologne for almost two centuries thereafter.

As successor of his uncle Ernest of Salzburg, Duke Albert was since 1560 administrator and owner of the mortgage of the county of Glatz, before he returned the redeemed county to Emperor Maximilian II in 1567.

== Cultural activity ==
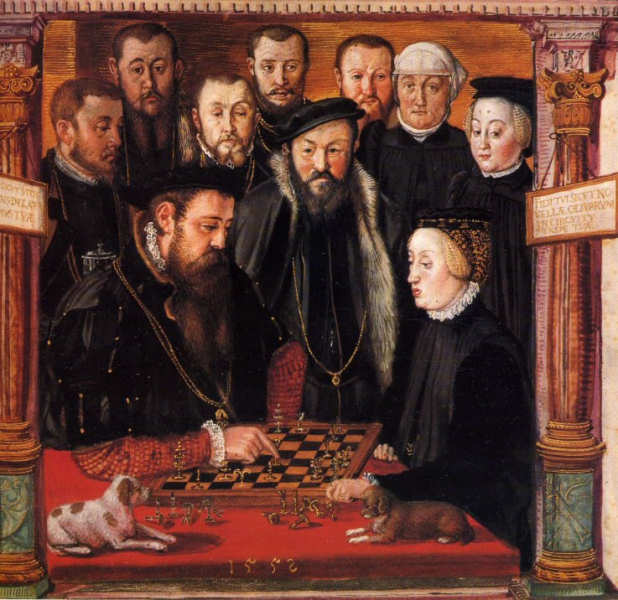
Duke Albert V of Bavaria and his consort Anna of Austria playing chess, portrait by Hans Mielich (1552)

In 1546, Albert and his father William IV ordered the construction of Dachau Palace (completed 1577), a Renaissance style four-winged palace with a court garden which eventually become the preferred dwelling of the rulers of Bavaria.

In 1552, Albert commissioned an inventory of the jewelry which he and his wife Anna owned. The resulting manuscript, still held by the Bavarian State Library, was the Jewel Book of the Duchess Anna of Bavaria ("Kleinodienbuch der Herzogin Anna von Bayern"), and contains 110 drawings by Hans Muelich. Albert was a patron of the arts and a collector whose personal accumulations are the basis of the Wittelsbach antique collection of Greek and Roman antiquities, the coin collection, and the Wittelsbach treasury in the Munich Residenz founded by him to house the jewels of the Wittelsbach dynasty; some of his Egyptian antiquities remain in the collection of Egyptian art. His personal library founded in 1558 has come to the Bavarian State Library in Munich, inheritor of the Wittelsbach court library. In 1559 Albert founded the Paedagogium in Munich.

Albert bought whole collections in Rome and Venice; in Venice, after tiresome drawn-out negotiations with the aged Andrea Loredan, he purchased the Loredan collection virtually in its entirety: 120 bronzes, 2480 medals and coins, 91 marble heads, 43 marble statues, 33 reliefs and 14 various curiosities, for the sum of 7000 ducats; "they were all exported from Venice secretly at night in large chests". At the same time, squabbles among the heirs of Gabriele Vendramin thwarted him in his attempt to purchase the single most important collection in Venice and paintings and antiquities, drawings by the masters and ancient coins. To house his extensive collection of antiquities he commissioned the Antiquarium (created 1568–1571) in the Munich Residenz, the largest Renaissance hall north of the Alps.

Albert appointed Orlando di Lasso to a court post and patronized many other artists; this led to a huge burden of debts (½ Mio. Fl.).

Albert died in 1579 in Munich and was succeeded by his son William. He is buried in the Frauenkirche in Munich.

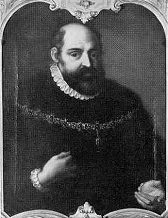
Duke Albert V of Bavaria

== Family and children ==
With Archduchess Anna of Austria he had seven children:

1. Charles, born and died in 1547
2. William V, Duke of Bavaria (29 September 1548 – 17 February 1626)
3. Ferdinand (20 January 1550 – 30 January 1608)
4. Maria Anna (21 March 1551 – 29 April 1608)
5. Maximiliana Maria (4 July 1552 – 11 July 1614)
6. Friedrich (26 July 1553 – 18 April 1554)
7. Ernest of Bavaria (17 December 1554 – 17 February 1612), Archbishop and prince-elector of Cologne 1583–1612

Albert is buried in the Frauenkirche in Munich.

== Ancestry ==
Ancestors of Albert V of Bavaria

8. Albert III, Duke of Bavaria-Munich
4. Albert IV, Duke of Bavaria
9. Anna of Brunswick-Grubenhagen-Einbeck
2. William IV, Duke of Bavaria
10. Frederick III, Holy Roman Emperor
5. Kunigunde of Austria
11. Eleanor of Portugal
1. Albert V, Duke of Bavaria
12. Christoph I of Baden
6. Philip I of Baden
13. Ottilie of Katzenelnbogen
3. Marie of Baden-Sponheim
14. Philip, Elector Palatine
7. Elisabeth of the Palatinate
15. Margaret of Bavaria
