= Philip II of Baden-Baden =

Philip II, Margrave of Baden-Baden
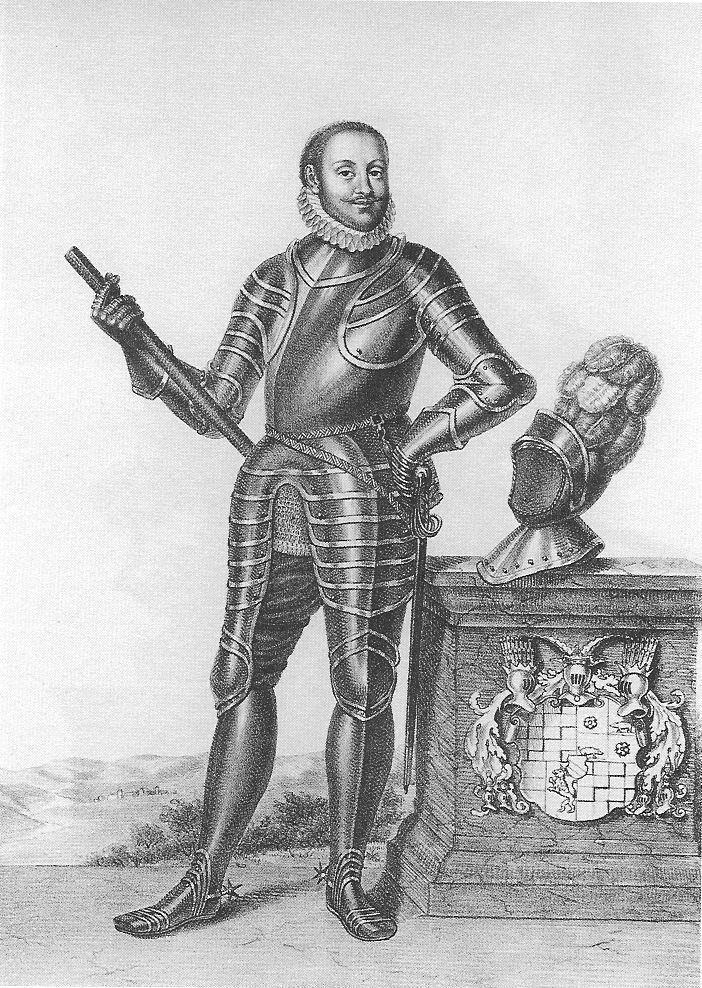
- Margrave Philip II of Baden
- Born: 19 February 1559; Baden-Baden
- Died: 7 June 1588 (aged 29); Baden-Baden
- Noble family: House of Zähringen
- Father: Philibert, Margrave of Baden-Baden
- Mother: Mechthild of Bavaria

Margrave Philip II of Baden (born 19 February 1559 in Baden-Baden – died 7 June 1588 in Baden-Baden) was from 1571 to 1588 Margrave of the Margraviate of Baden-Baden. He was the son of the Protestant Margrave Philibert of Baden-Baden and the Catholic Mechthild of Bavaria.

== Life ==
Philip's father, Philibert, died in early October 1569 during the Battle of Moncontour. The 10-year-old Philip and his one-year older sister Jakobea were then raised by their guardian, their uncle Albert V of Bavaria. Albert gave Philip a strictly Catholic education. At the University of Ingolstadt, Philip was educated in the spirit of the Counter Reformation.

Philibert had promised his subjects freedom of religion, but after his death, this freedom was more and more restricted by his widow and his son, who were strongly influenced by their Catholic upbringing. Even during the regency of his uncle and guardian Duke Albert V, the Catholic rite was reintroduced in Baden-Baden in the years 1570–71. After he took up government, Philip's first decree was that all citizens of Baden-Baden had to visit church services, under threat of severe penalties.

Philip dismantled the New Castle at Baden-Baden (the one built in 1579) and built a more magnificent, Renaissance-style castle on the same spot. This increased his debts considerably. An inventory made in 1582 brought to light, in addition to 218 musical instruments, a debt of 200000guilders. Philip tried to cover these debts by rearranging the commercial sector and increasing taxes. Thus, the economy of the margraviate gradually came to resemble a planned economy.

A dark chapter in the history of Baden-Baden are the witch-hunts, that took place during his reign. They began during the Bavarian regency, but their number increased considerably during Philips's reign. The last witch hunt under Philip II took place in 1580; 18 women were burnt at the stake in the districts of Rastatt, Baden-Baden and Kuppenheim.

When Philip died at the age of 29, he left no descendants, and was succeeded by his cousin Edward Fortunatus, Margrave of Baden-Rodemachern. Philip was buried in the Collegiate Church in Baden-Baden.

== Ancestors ==
Ancestors of Philip II of Baden-Baden

16. Charles I, Margrave of Baden-Baden
8. Christopher I, Margrave of Baden-Baden
17. Catherine of Austria
4. Bernhard III, Margrave of Baden-Baden
18. Philip II "the Younger" of Katzenelnbogen
9. Ottilie of Katzenelnbogen
19. Ottilie of Nassau-Siegen
2. Philibert, Margrave of Baden-Baden
20. Anthony I, Count of Ligny
10. Charles I, Count of Ligny
21. Françoise of Croÿ-Chimay
5. Françoise of Luxembourg-Brienne
22. Jacques d'Estouteville, Baron of Saint-André
11. Charlotte of Estouteville
23. Gilette de Coëtivy
1. Philip II, Margrave of Baden-Baden
24. Albert III, Duke of Bavaria
12. Albert IV, Duke of Bavaria
25. Anna of Brunswick-Grubenhagen-Einbeck
6. William IV, Duke of Bavaria
26. Frederick III, Holy Roman Emperor
13. Kunigunde of Austria
27. Eleanor of Portugal, Holy Roman Empress
3. Mechthild of Bavaria
28. Christopher I, Margrave of Baden-Baden
14. Philip I, Margrave of Baden
29. Ottilie of Katzenelnbogen
7. Marie of Baden-Sponheim
30. Philip, Elector Palatine
15. Elisabeth of the Palatinate
31. Margaret of Bavaria, Electress Palatine

Philip II of Baden-Baden House of Zähringen Born: 19 February 1559 Died: 7 June 1588
Preceded by Philibert	Margrave of Baden-Baden; 1569–1588	Succeeded by Edward Fortunatus
