= Ernest of Bavaria =

Prince-Elector-Archbishop of Cologne from 1583 to 1612

- Prince-Elector-Archbishop of Cologne
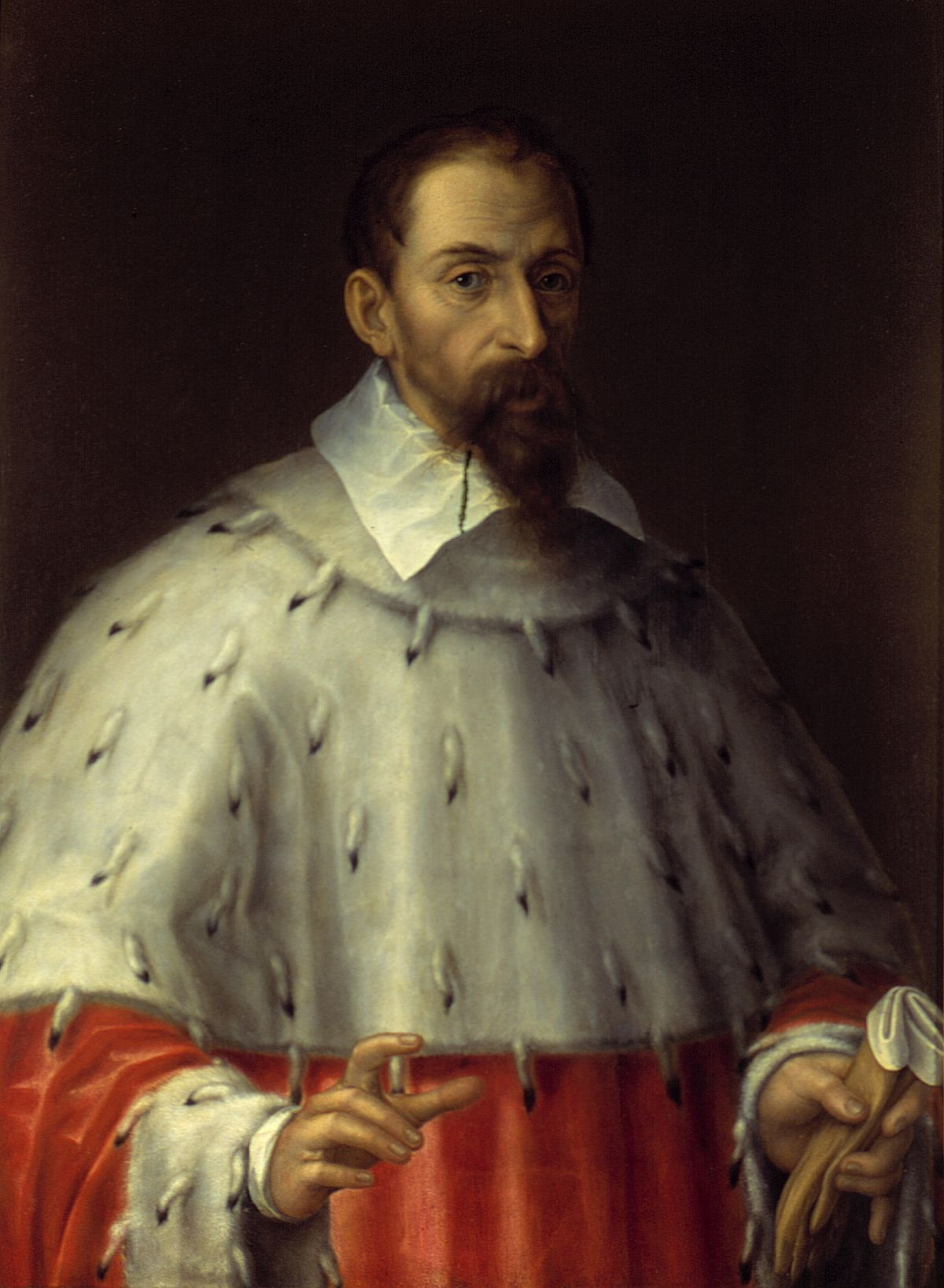
- Portrait by Hans Werl, now in the Alte Pinakothek (c. 1601)
- Reign: April 1583 – 17 February 1612
- Predecessor: Gebhard Truchsess von Waldburg
- Successor: Ferdinand of Bavaria
- Born: 17 December 1554; Munich, Duchy of Bavaria
- Died: 17 February 1612 (aged 57); Arnsberg, Archbishopric of Cologne
- Burial: Cologne Cathedral
- House: Wittelsbach
- Father: Albert V, Duke of Bavaria
- Mother: Anna von Habsburg

Wittelsbach-Hapsburg aristocrat Ernest of Bavaria (German: Ernst von Bayern) (17 December 1554 – 17 February 1612) was Prince-Elector-Archbishop of the Archbishopric of Cologne and, as such, Archchancellor of the Holy Roman Empire and Duke of Westphalia, from 1583 to 1612 as successor of the expelled Archbishop Gebhard Truchsess von Waldburg.

He was also simultaneously Prince-Bishop of Münster, Hildesheim, Freising, and Liège, Count of Loon, and Prince-Abbot of Stavelot. In Freising he had already become bishop by the age of 12.

== Early life and education ==
Ernest was born in Munich, the son of Albert V, Duke of Bavaria, and Anna of Austria. Duke Albert had destined his third son, Ernest, for the clerical vocation. He was educated and trained by the Jesuits at Ingolstadt.

== Ancestry ==
Ancestors of Ernest of Bavaria

16. Albert III, Duke of Bavaria
8. Albert IV, Duke of Bavaria
17. Anna of Brunswick-Grubenhagen-Einbeck
4. William IV, Duke of Bavaria
18. Frederick III, Holy Roman Emperor
9. Kunigunde of Austria
19. Eleanor of Portugal
Albert V, Duke of Bavaria
20. Christopher I, Margrave of Baden-Baden
10. Philip I, Margrave of Baden-Sponheim
21. Ottilie von Katzenelnbogen
5. Marie of Baden-Sponheim
22. Philip, Elector Palatine
11. Elisabeth of the Palatinate
23. Margaret of Bavaria
Ernest of Bavaria
24. Maximilian I, Holy Roman Emperor
12. Philip I of Castile
25. Mary of Burgundy
6. Ferdinand I, Holy Roman Emperor
26. Ferdinand II of Aragon
13. Joanna of Castile
27. Isabella I of Castile
Archduchess Anna of Austria
28. Casimir IV Jagiellon
14. Vladislaus II of Bohemia and Hungary
29. Archduchess Elisabeth of Austria
7. Anna of Bohemia and Hungary
30. Gaston de Foix, Count of Candale
15. Anna of Foix-Candale
31. Infanta Catherine of Navarre

Ernest of Bavaria House of Wittelsbach Born: 1554 Died: 1612
German royalty
Regnal titles
Catholic Church titles
Preceded by Moritz von Sandizell	Prince-Bishop of Freising; 1566–1612	Succeeded by Stephan von Seiboldsdorf
Preceded by Burkhard of Oberg	Prince-Bishop of Hildesheim (as Ernest II); 1573–1612	Succeeded by Ferdinand of Bavaria
Preceded by Gerard of Grœsbeek	Prince-Bishop of Liège; Prince-Abbot of Stavelot-Malmedy; 1581–1612	Succeeded by Ferdinand of Bavaria
Preceded by Gebhard Truchsess von Waldburg	Archbishop-Elector of Cologne and Duke of Westphalia and Angria; 1583–1612	Succeeded by Ferdinand of Bavaria
Preceded by John William of Jülich-Cleves-Berg	Prince-Bishop of Münster; 1585–1612	Succeeded by Ferdinand of Bavaria
