= Anna Maria of Baden =

German princess

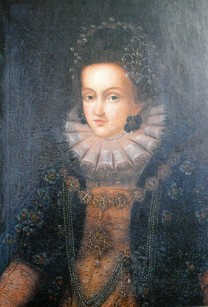
- Born: 22 May 1562
- Died: 25 April 1583 (aged 20); Třeboň, Kingdom of Bohemia
- Noble family: Zähringen (by birth); Rosenberg (by marriage)
- Spouse: William of Rosenberg
- Father: Philibert, Margrave of Baden-Baden
- Mother: Mechthild of Bavaria

Princess Anna Maria of Baden (22 May 1562 – 25 April 1583) was a German noblewoman.

== Biography ==
Anna Maria of Baden was born on 22 May 1562. Her father was Philibert, Margrave of Baden-Baden. Her mother, Mechthild of Bavaria, was a daughter of William IV, Duke of Bavaria. She was a sister of Jakobea and Philip II.

She married William of Rosenberg on 27 January 1578, becoming his third wife. The ceremony was performed by Antonín Brus of Mohelnice. She and William had no children.

Anna Maria died in Třeboň on 25 April 1583 and is buried in the Church of St. Vitus in Český Krumlov.
