= Philibert, Margrave of Baden-Baden =

Philibert of Baden
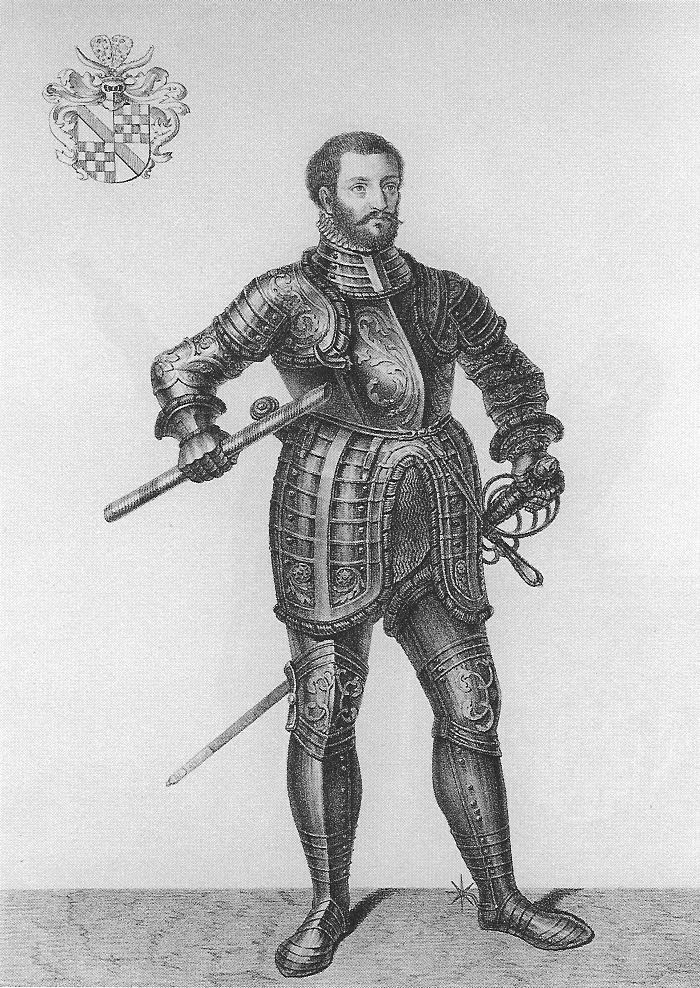
- Margrave Philibert of Baden
- Born: 22 January 1536; Baden-Baden
- Died: 3 October 1569 (aged 33); Moncontour
- Noble family: Zähringen
- Spouse: Mechthild of Bavaria
- Issue: Jakobea; Philip II; Anna Maria; Maria Salome; Son
- Father: Bernhard III, Margrave of Baden-Baden
- Mother: Franziska of Luxembourg

Margrave Philibert of Baden (22 January 1536 in Baden-Baden – 3 October 1569 in Montcontour) ruled the Margraviate of Baden-Baden from 1554 to 1569. Philibert was the son of the Margrave Bernhard III, Margrave of Baden-Baden and Franziska of Luxembourg, daughter of Charles I, Count of Ligny.

Philibert spent part of his youth at the court of Duke William IV of Bavaria in Munich. William, who later became his father-in-law, was known for his strict Catholic perspective and brought the Jesuits to Bavaria. Margrave Philibert was a supporter of Protestantism and converted to it, undeterred by his father-in-law. In 1555 he took part in the negotiations that resulted in the Peace of Augsburg. In 1565 he wanted to come to the aid of the Huguenots in France with 1,500 men. Emperor Maximilian II, however, told him not to do so and Philibert acquiesced.

In 1566, Philibert served in the Imperial army, fighting in Hungary against Sultan Suleiman I. In 1569 he even fought against the Huguenots. He fought on the side of King Charles IX of France, the son in law of Emperor Maximilian II.

Philibert was killed on 3 October 1569 in the Battle of Moncontour against the Huguenots, which the French king won. According to his friend, Heinrich von Stein, he left the battlefield alive and was then pursued by the Huguenots to a castle on the Spanish border, where they caught up with him and killed him. He left a 10-year-old son, Philip who succeeded him as Margrave Philip II. Philip II had an older sister Jakobea and two younger sisters. Philibert's uncle Albert V brought the siblings to Munich and raised them there.

Margrave Philibert was a Protestant, but he was very tolerant in matters of faith. He gave his subjects freedom of religion and he even married a Catholic, Mechthild of Bavaria.

== Marriage and issue ==
Philibert married on 17 January 1557 Mechthild of Bavaria (born: 14 June 1532; died: 2 November 1565), daughter of the Duke William IV of Bavaria. They had five children:

- Jakobea (born: 16 January 1558; died: 3 September 1597, killed in Düsseldorf), married Duke John William of Jülich-Berg-Cleves.
- Philip II (born: 19 February 1559 in Baden-Baden, died: 17 June 1588), Margrave of Baden-Baden.
- Anna Maria (born: 22 May 1562; died: 25 April 1583 Třeboň), third wife of William of Rosenberg.
- Maria Salome (born: 1 February 1563; died: 30 April 1600 in Pfreimd).
- Son (born and died on 31 October 1565).

== Ancestors ==
Ancestors of Philibert, Margrave of Baden-Baden

16. Jacob, Margrave of Baden-Baden
8. Charles I, Margrave of Baden-Baden
17. Catherine de Lorraine
4. Christopher I, Margrave of Baden-Baden
18. Ernest, Duke of Austria
9. Catherine of Austria
19. Cymburgis of Masovia
2. Bernhard III, Margrave of Baden-Baden
20. Philip I, Count of Katzenelnbogen
10. Philip II of Katzenelnbogen
21. Anne of Württemberg
5. Ottilie of Katzenelnbogen
22. Henry II, Count of Nassau-Siegen
11. Ottilie of Nassau-Siegen
23. Genoveva of Virneburg
1. Philibert, Margrave of Baden-Baden
24. Louis de Luxembourg, Count of Saint-Pol
12. Anthony I, Count of Ligny
25. Jeanne de Bar, Countess of Marle and Soissons
6. Charles I, Count of Ligny
26. Philip I of Croÿ-Chimay
13. Françoise de Croÿ-Chimay
27. Walburga of Moers-Saarwerden
3. Françoise of Luxembourg-Brienne
28. Robert d'Estouteville, Seigneur de Beynes
14. Jaques d'Estouteville
29. Ambroise de Loré, dame d'Ivry
7. Charlotte d'Estouteville
30. Olivier de Coëtivy, Count of Taillebourg
15. Gilette de Coëtivy
31. Marie de Valois

== See also ==
- Baden
- List of rulers of Baden

== Sources ==
- Butler, A.J. (1907). "The Wars of Religion in France". In Ward, A.W.; Prothero, G.W.; Leathes, Stanley (eds.). The Cambridge Modern History. Vol. III. Cambridge University Press.
- Albert Krieger (1887). "Philibert, Markgraf von Baden-Baden" . Allgemeine Deutsche Biographie (in German). Vol. 25. Leipzig: Duncker & Humblot. pp. 739–741.

Philibert, Margrave of Baden-Baden House of Zähringen Born: 22 January 1536 Died: 3 October 1569
Preceded by Bernhard III	Margrave of Baden-Baden; 1554–1569	Succeeded by Philip II
