= Bernhard III =

Bernhard III may refer to:

- Bernard III, Duke of Saxony (c. 1140–1212)
- Bernhard III, Prince of Anhalt-Bernburg (died 1348), German prince of the House of Ascania
- Bernhard III of Trent (1484–1539)
- Bernhard III, Duke of Saxe-Meiningen (1851–1928), last reigning duke of Saxe-Meiningen
- Bernhard III, Margrave of Baden-Baden (1474–1536), inherited in 1515 part of his father's margraviate of Baden
