= Maria of Baden-Sponheim =

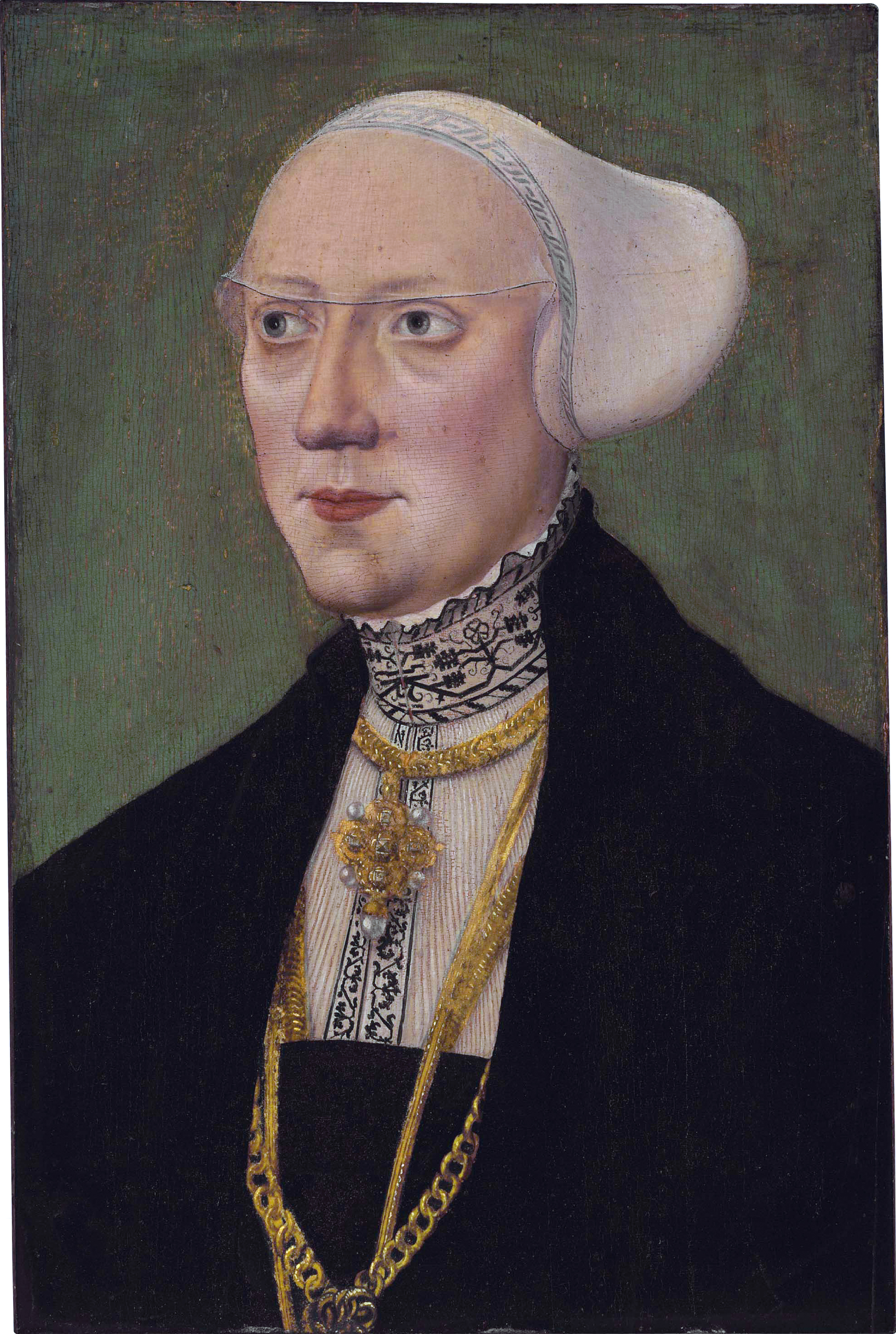

Duchess consort of Bavaria
- Tenure: 5 October 1522 – 7 March 1550
- Born: 25 June 1507
- Died: 16 November 1580 (aged 73); Munich, Bavaria
- Spouse: William IV, Duke of Bavaria
- Issue: Albert V, Duke of Bavaria; Mechthild of Bavaria
- House: House of Zähringen
- Father: Philip I, Margrave of Baden
- Mother: Elisabeth of the Palatinate

Maria Jakobäa of Baden-Sponheim (25 June 1507 – 16 November 1580) was a German noblewoman and duchess consort of Bavaria.

== Life ==
Maria was the daughter of Philip I, Margrave of Baden and Countess Elisabeth, daughter of Philip, Elector Palatine and princess Margarete von Bayern-Landshut. Her paternal grandparents were Christopher I, Margrave of Baden-Baden and Ottilie of Katzenelnbogen.

On 5 October 1522 she married William IV, Duke of Bavaria, eldest son of Albert IV and his wife Kunigunde of Austria. They had four children:

- Theodor (1526–1534)
- Albert V (1528–1579) ∞ 1546 Archduchess Anna of Austria (1528–1590)
- Wilhelm (1529–1530)
- Mechthild of Bavaria (1532–1565) ∞ 1557 Margrave Philibert of Baden-Baden (1536–1569)

== Bibliography ==
- Hans and Marga Rall: Die Wittelsbacher – Von Otto I. bis Elisabeth I., Weltbild (1994) ISBN 3-85001-485-1

Maria of Baden-Sponheim House of Zähringen Born: 25 June 1507 Died: 16 November 1580
Royal titles
Preceded by Kunigunde of Austria	Duchess consort of Bavaria; 1522–1550	Succeeded by Anna of Austria
