= German civil war =

German civil war may refer to any violent conflict between factions within or against the authority of a German state:

- Saxon revolt of 1073–1075, coalition led by Otto of Northeim against the Holy Roman Empire
- Saxon revolt of 1077–1088, coalition led by anti-king Rudolf of Rheinfeld against the Holy Roman Empire
- War of Bohemian Succession (1125–1126), Duchy of Bohemia against the Holy Roman Empire
- Great Interregnum (1250–1275), Hohenstaufen-led coalition against Welf-led coalition
- Bundschuh movement (1493–1517), localized peasant rebellions against the Kingdom of Germany
- Swabian War (1499), Old Swiss Confederacy against the Holy Roman Empire
- Knights' War (1522), Franz von Sickingen-led coalition against the Holy Roman Empire
- German Peasants' War (1524–1525), widespread peasant rebellions against the Swabian League
- Schmalkaldic War (1546–1547), Schmalkaldic League against the Holy Roman Empire
- Princes' Revolt (1552), Maurice of Saxony-led coalition against the Holy Roman Empire
- War of the Jülich Succession (1609–1614), Protestant coalition against the United Duchies of Jülich-Cleves-Berg
- Thirty Years' War (1618–1635), anti-Habsburg alliance against pro-Habsburg alliance
- Upper Austrian peasant war of 1626, Upper Austrian rebels against the Electorate of Bavaria
- German revolutions of 1848–1849 (March Revolution), German Empire against the German Confederation
- Austro-Prussian War (German War of Brothers, 1866), Kingdom of Prussia and allies against the Austrian Empire and German Confederation
- German revolution of 1918–1919 (November Revolution, 1918–1919), revolutionaries and Soviet Republics against German Empire, later Weimar Republic
