= William of Rosenberg =

Bohemian nobleman

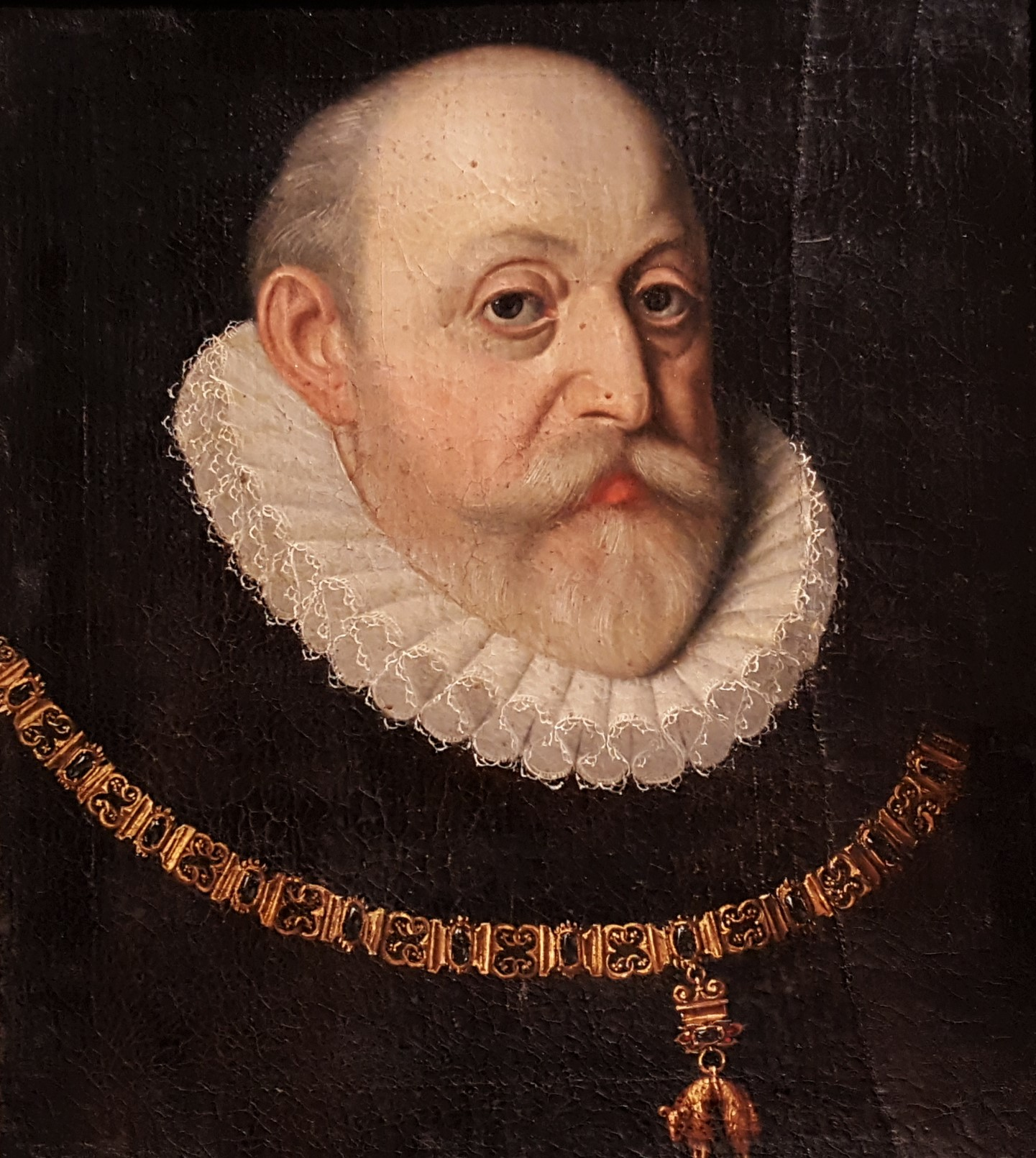
- Born: 10 March 1535
- Died: 31 August 1592 (aged 57)
- Buried: St. Vitus Church in Český Krumlov
- Noble family: House of Rosenberg
- Spouses: Catherine of Brunswick; Sophie of Brandenburg; Anna Maria of Baden; Polyxena of Pernstein
- Father: Jošt III of Rosenberg
- Mother: Anna of Roggendorf

William of Rosenberg (Czech: Vilém z Rožmberka; 10 March 1535 – 31 August 1592) was a Bohemian nobleman. He served as High Treasurer and High Burgrave of Bohemia.

== Life ==
William of Rosenberg was a member of the influential noble House of Rosenberg. He was the son of Jošt III of Rosenberg and his second wife Anna of Roggendorf (d. 1562). His father died when William was four years old. William and his younger brother Peter Vok then stood under the guardianship of their uncle Peter V. From age seven, he studied at the Protestant private school of Arnošt Kraiger von Kraigk in Mladá Boleslav. In 1544, at the age of nine, he switched to a Catholic school for young nobles at the court of Bishop Wolfgang of Passau.

On 23 April 1551, at the age of sixteen, William was declared an adult by a decree of Emperor Ferdinand I. He took up the administration of the family's possessions and chose as his residence Český Krumlov Castle, which he remodeled in the Renaissance style. From 1552 to 1556, he fought a court case against Henry IV of Plauen, the High Chancellor of Bohemia, about their precedence in Bohemian society. In 1560, he was appointed High Treasurer by King Ferdinand. In 1566, he was appointed commander of the Bohemian army and on 10 June 1566, he began forming an army at Znojmo to fight a war against the Ottoman Empire. Their aim was to recapture Szigetvár, which William's brother-in-law Nikola Šubić Zrinski had lost to the Turks. The Habsburg armies were to meet at Győr. However, the Turks retreated south after the death of Suleiman the Magnificent and no battle ensued.

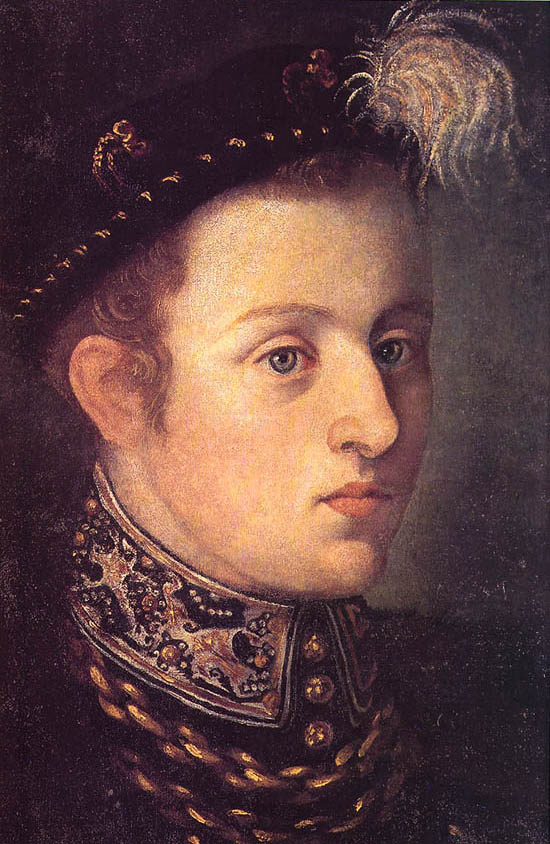
Youth Portrait

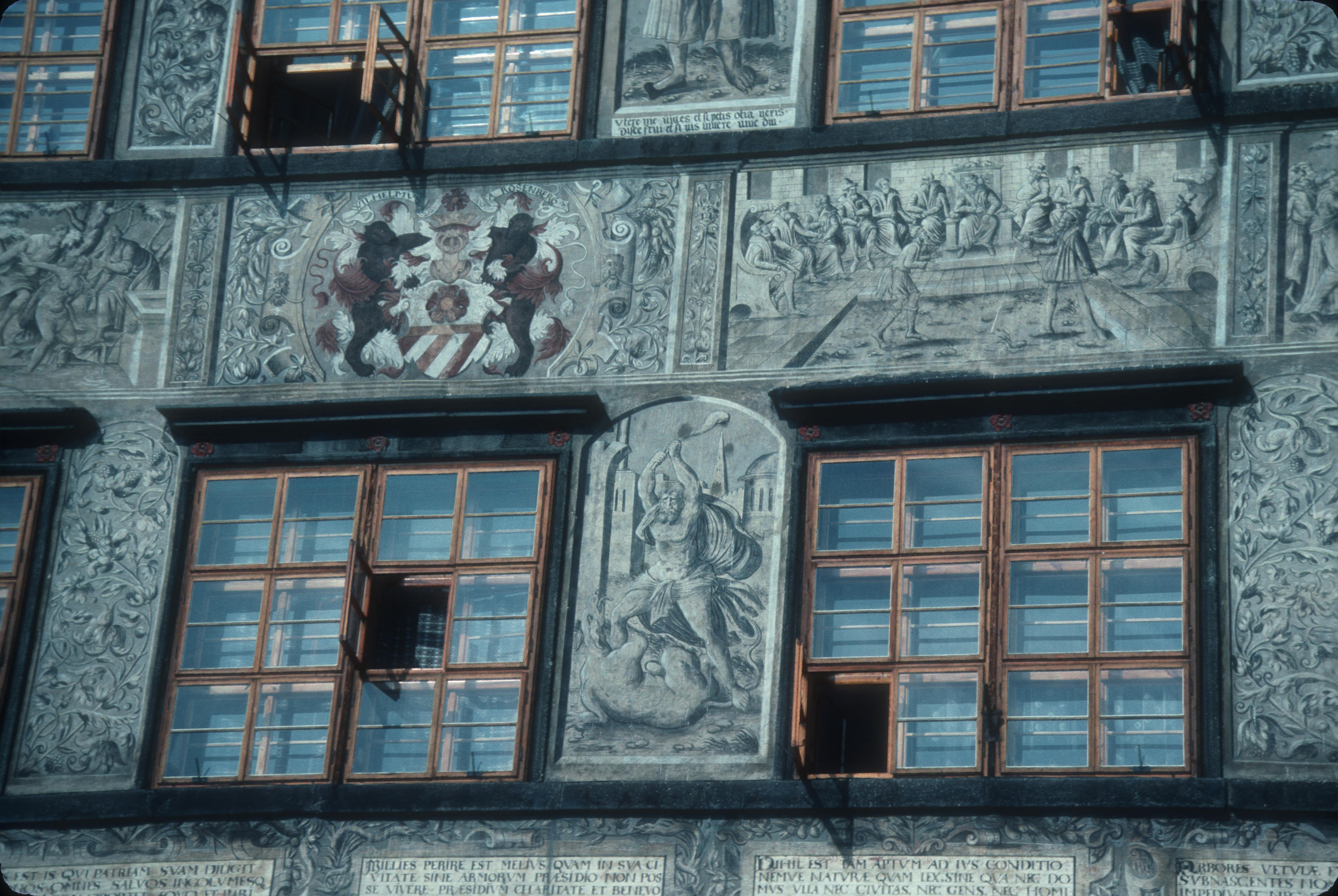
The salt house built at Prachatice in 1571. Note his name WILHELMUS ROSENBERG in the central fresco.

On 26 May 1570, William was appointed High Burgrave of Bohemia, the highest office in the Kingdom. In this position, he was repeatedly given diplomatic duties, for example, he was sent to Germany twice. In 1572, he negotiated with Emperor Maximilian II, the leader of the Holy League about the next step to take in the ongoing war with then Ottoman Empire. In 1574, he was involved in the negotiations about electing King Rudolf II of Bohemia as the new emperor. In Poland, he represented the interests of Archduke Ernest of Austria, who aimed to be elected King of Poland. His efforts were in vain, although he gained so much sympathy that when King Henry fled, he was considered as a candidate to be the next king. As it happened, King Rudolf was also interested and out of loyalty, William withdrew. Eventually Stephen Bathory, a Transylvanian prince, was elected. However, he died shortly after his election. William was honored with the order of the Golden Fleece for his diplomatic mediation.

In 1587, Sigismund III Vasa was elected as the new King of Poland, defeating the Habsburg candidate Maximilian III. Maximilian then tried to grab power in Poland by invading the country. His army was defeated by the Polish general Jan Zamoyski and he was taken prisoner. William was sent to Poland to negotiate his release. These negotiations led to a peace treaty in March 1589, and Maximilian's release.

In addition to his high political office, William was actively promoting science, literature, music and architecture. Both he and his younger brother Peter Vok acted as patrons of the arts. They supported the Charles University in Prague and founded secondary schools in their territories. They created a library with a vast collection of precious manuscripts and incunables. With its approximately 11000 volumes, it was one of the largest libraries of its time. Many humanists such as the Flemish mineralogist, physician and naturalist Anselmus de Boodt (1550-1632) were active at his court.

William also supported economic and cultural development in his territories. His Třeboň Castle was expanded and remodeled in a renaissance style by the architect Antonio Ericer between 1565 and 1575. He added the southwest wing, a tower and the entrance gate. In 1573, William expanded the Rosenberg Palace his uncle Peter V had built inside the Prague Castle, using designs made by the architect Ulrico Aostalli. In the town of Roudnice nad Labem, which he acquired in 1577, he renewed the castle and the bridge across the Elbe.

In 1580, William exchanged some territory with his business manager Jakub Krčín: he transferred Sedlčany and Křepenice to Jakub and received a large deer parc and the Leptáč manor near Netolice in return. Between 1583 and 1589, William built his Kratochvíle Castle at Netolice. This castle is one of the most important Renaissance buildings in southern Bohemia. In 1584, he invited the Jesuits to his Český Krumlov Castle and between 1586 and 1588, they constructed a large college building there. The castle, which was his main residence, was extensively remodeled during his reign and he equipped a number of state rooms in the upper castle. In 1580, he added a tower, connected to the castle with a Renaissance arcade. In 1589 he took part in the negotiations of the Treaty of Bytom and Będzin. Around 1590, he added the Little Castle. He gave town rights to Borovany, which was located in his land, and in Libějovice he expanded the old castle into another renaissance castle. In Třeboň, he promoted carp breeding and constructed the Rožmberk Pond.

William died in 1592 and was buried in the St. Vitus Church in Český Krumlov, next to his third wife, Anna Maria of Baden. Since he was childless, his younger brother Petr Vok inherited his possessions. When Petr Vok died in 1611, the House of Rosenberg died out in the male line.

== Marriages ==
William married four times. All four marriages were childless. By marrying German imperial princesses, he gained political influence outside Bohemia, which benefitted his diplomatic efforts. He married:

1. Catherine of Brunswick (1534 – 10 May 1559). They married on 28 February 1557 in Münden. She died either in Karlovy Vary or in Teplice and was buried in the Rosenberg family vault in the Vyšší Brod Monastery
2. Sophie of Brandenburg (15 December 1541 – 27 June 1564), a granddaughter of King Sigismund I of Poland, and daughter of Joachim II Hector, Elector of Brandenburg. They married on 14 December 1561 in Cölln (now part of Berlin). She died in Český Krumlov and was also buried in Vyšší Brod Monastery
3. Anna Maria of Baden (22 May 1562 – 25 April 1583), daughter of Philibert, Margrave of Baden-Baden. She was 15 years old when they married on 27 January 1578. She died in Třeboň and was buried in the St. Vitus Church in Český Krumlov.
4. Polyxena of Pernštejn (d. 1642). They married on 11 January 1587. After William's death, she married Zdeněk Vojtěch Popel z Lobkovic
