= Mechthild of Bavaria =

German noblewoman

Coat-of-arms of Wittelsbach.

Mechthild of Bavaria (12 July 1532 – 2 November 1565 in Baden-Baden) was a German noblewoman. She was the daughter of William IV, Duke of Bavaria and his wife Marie. She was buried in the Stiftskirche at Baden-Baden.

On 17 January 1557 she married Philibert, Margrave of Baden-Baden, and they had the following children:

- Jakobea (16 January 1558 – 3 September 1597 in Düsseldorf), married Duke John William of Jülich-Cleves-Berg.
- Philip II (19 February 1559 in Baden-Baden – 17 June 1588), Margrave of Baden.
- Anna Maria (22 May 1562 – 25 April 1583 in Třeboň).
- Maria Salome (1 February 1563 – 30 April 1600 in Pfreimd).

Mechthild is a German form of Matilde.
