= Hans Schöpfer the Elder =

German painter

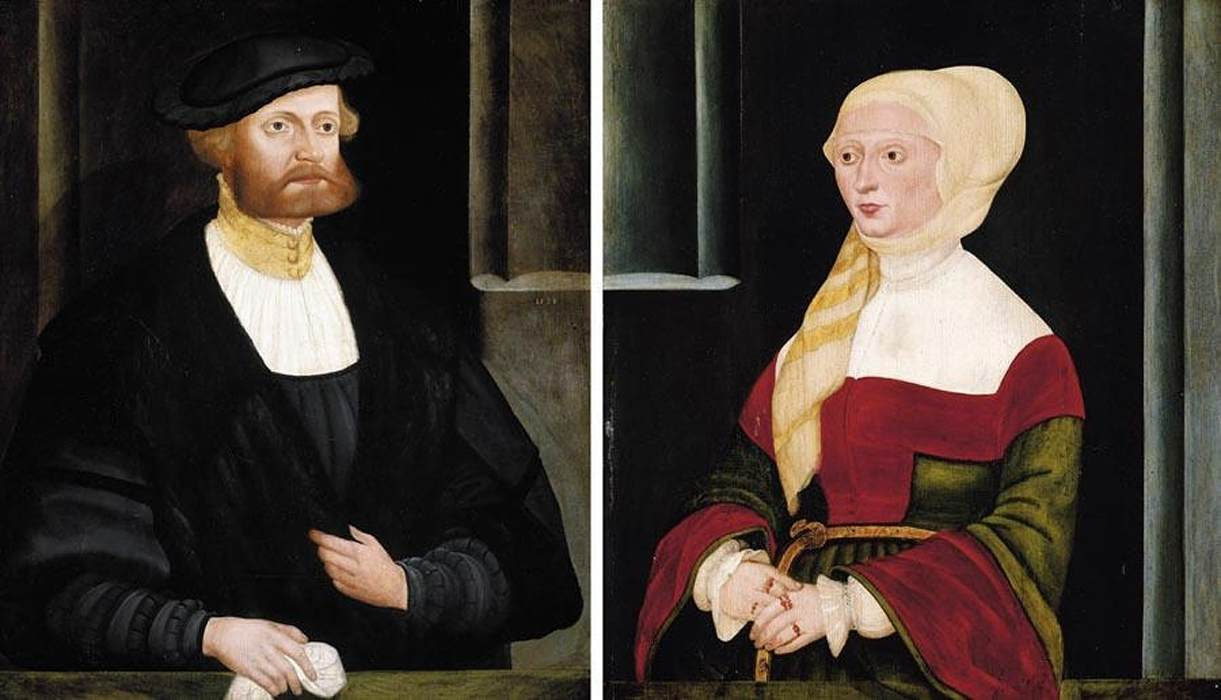
Double Portrait

Hans Schöpfer the Elder (c. 1505 – 1569, Munich) was a German portrait painter.

== Life and work ==
He may have originated in Nuremberg. In 1520, he is documented as an apprentice in the workshop of Wolfgang Muelich, father of the portrait painter Hans Muelich. He left there in 1525 and, in 1531, is listed as a member of the Munich Painter's Guild, of which he became president in 1538.

In between, he was one of several painters who worked with Jörg Breu the Elder to create a series of panel paintings depicting virtuous men and women from the Bible and Roman history.

He was employed by William IV, Duke of Bavaria, and painted a series of portraits of Ladies of the Court for Archduchess Anna, the wife of Albert V, Duke of Bavaria.

His son, also named Hans, is known to have been a portrait painter in Munich until at least 1610.
