= Ernest, Margrave of Baden-Durlach =

Margrave of Baden-Durlach, Founder of the Ernestine line of Baden

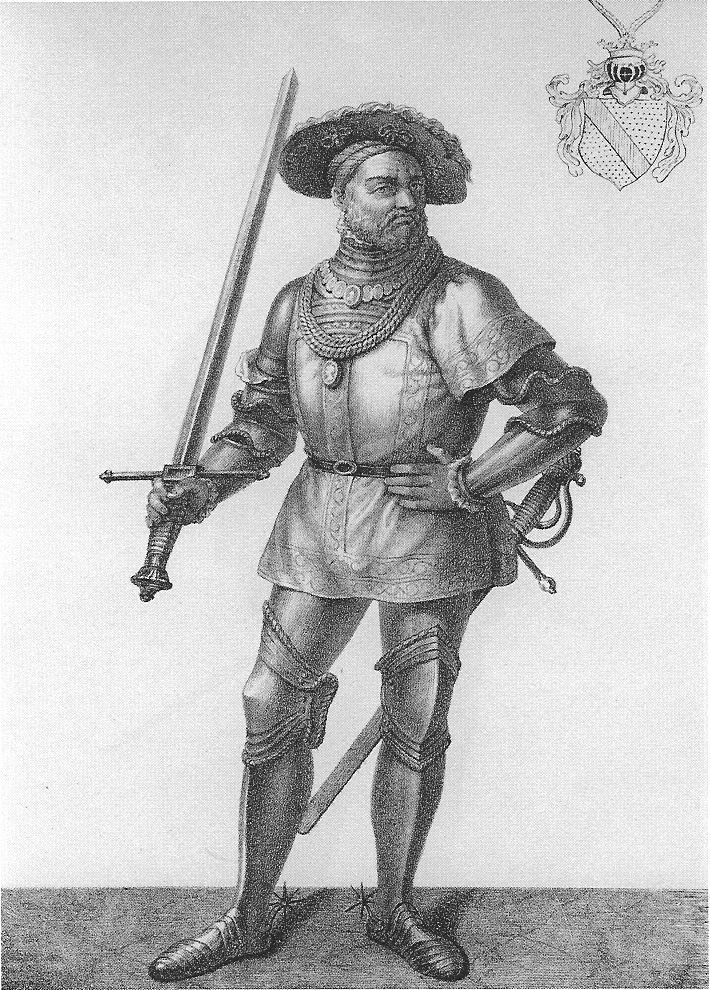
- Ernest, Margrave of Baden-Durlach
- Born: 7 October 1482; Pforzheim
- Died: 6 February 1553 (aged 70); Sulzburg
- Noble family: House of Zähringen
- Spouses: Elisabeth of Brandenburg-Ansbach-Kulmbach; Ursula of Rosenfeld; Anna Bombast of Hohenheim
- Father: Christopher I, Margrave of Baden
- Mother: Ottilie of Katzenelnbogen

Margrave Ernest I of Baden-Durlach (7 October 1482, Pforzheim – 6 February 1553, Sulzburg) was the founder of the so-called "Ernestine" line of the House of Baden, the line from which the later Grand Dukes descended. He was the ruling Margrave of Baden-Pforzheim from 1533 and resided in Pforzheim from 1537. In 1565, his son Charles II moved the capital to Durlach and thereby changed the name of his country to Baden-Durlach. He had to deal with the upcoming Reformation and the frequent Ottoman wars in Europe. In this turbulent time, he tried to maintain a neutral position between the Protestants and Catholics. He did not participate in the Schmalkaldic War.

== Life ==
Ernest was the seventh son of the Margrave Christopher I of Baden and Ottilie of Katzenelnbogen.

Ernest was at first – like most of his brothers – destined for the clergy and was ordained in 1496 in Graben-Neudorf by the Vicar General of Diocese of Speyer. But he was not willing to renounce his inheritance and changed from a spiritual career to a military one. In 1509 he participated in the campaign of the Emperor Maximilian I against the Republic of Venice.

His father, Margrave Christopher I, proposed to make his fifth son, Philip I his sole successor, since Philip was most qualified to govern the country and Christopher wanted to avoid a division of his territory. On 18 June 1511, Christopher demanded that the Estates of Rötteln, Sausenberg and Badenweiler salute Philip, but they refused. On subsequent meetings of the Estates in Rötteln and in 1512 in Kandern, they refused to pay homage to Philip, because they would not be drawn into the internal struggles of the house of Baden. Ernest had threatened the Estates that he would respond with violence if they were to pay homage to his brother.

Ernest administered parts of Baden on behalf of his father from 1515 onwards, as did his brothers Philip I and Bernhard III. After Philip's death, Bernard III and Ernest divided the country into the Margraviates of Baden-Baden ("Bernhardine line") and Baden-Durlach ("Ernestine line"). The two parts were reunited in 1771 under Margrave and later Grand Duke Charles Frederick, a descendant of the Ernestine line, after the extinction of the other lines.

== Marriages and issue ==
Ernest first married on 29 September 1510 with Elisabeth of Brandenburg-Ansbach-Kulmbach (born: 25 March 1494; died: 31 May 1518), the daughter of Margrave Frederick I of Brandenburg-Ansbach-Kulmbach. They had the following children:

- Albert (born: July 1511; died: 12 December 1542), participated in the Austrian war against the Turks in 1541 in Hungary and died on the way back in Wasserburg am Inn
- Anna (born: April 1512; died after 1579), married on 11 February 1537 to Count Charles I of Hohenzollern (born: 1516; died: 8 March 1576)
- Amalie (born: February 1513; died 1594), married in 1561 Count Frederick II of Löwenstein (born: 22 August 1528; died: 5 June 1569)
- Marie Jacqueline (born: October 1514; died: 1592), married in February 1577 to Count Wolfgang II of Barby (born: 11 December 1531; died: 23 March 1615)
- Marie Cleopha (born: September 1515; died: 28 April 1580), married in 1548 Count William of Schultz (died circa 1566)
- Elizabeth (born: 20 May 1516; died: 9 May 1568), married firstly in 1533 Count Gabriel von Salamanca-Ortenburg (died: December 1539), married secondly on 30 July 1543 Count Conrad II of Castell (born: 10 July 1519; died: 8 July 1577)
- Bernhard (born: February 1517; died: 20 January 1553), ruling Margrave

=== First morganatic marriage: Ursula of Rosenfeld ===
Ernest's second marriage was in 1518 with Ursula of Rosenfeld (died: 26 February 1538), the daughter of Wolf of Rosenfeld (d. 1518), Schultheiß of the town of Rosenfeld. This was a morganatic marriage. During Ernests's lifetime, it was controversial whether his son Charles could inherit the Margraviate. In the end, Charles could only inherit the margraviate from his half-brother because the guardians of his cousins in the Bernhardine line did not object. In 1594, this morganatic marriage was cited in the imperial court as an argument when Margrave Ernest Frederick — a grandson of Ernest – contested the right to inherit of the children of Margrave Edward Fortunatus and Marie of Eicken.

They had:

- Margaret (1519–1571)

married on 12 November 1538 to Count Wolfgang II of Oettingen (1511–1572)

- Salome (d. 1559)

married in 1540 Count Ladislas of Fraunberg-Haag (born: 1495, died: 31 August 1566)

- Charles II (born: 24 July 1529; died: 23 March 1577), ruling Margrave

=== Second morganatic marriage: Anna Bombast von Hohenheim ===
Ernest married his third wife on 1 March 1544. She was Anna Bombast of Hohenheim (died: 6 June 1574), cousin of his second wife. This marriage produced no children.

== Ancestors ==
Ancestors of Ernest, Margrave of Baden-Durlach

16. Bernard I, Margrave of Baden-Baden
8. Jacob, Margrave of Baden-Baden
17. Anna of Oettingen
4. Charles I, Margrave of Baden-Baden
18. Charles II, Duke of Lorraine
9. Catherine de Lorraine
19. Margaret of the Palatinate
2. Christopher I, Margrave of Baden
20. Leopold III, Duke of Austria
10. Ernest, Duke of Austria
21. Viridis Visconti
5. Catherine of Austria
22. Siemowit IV of Masovia
11. Cymburgis of Masovia
23. Alexandra of Lithuania
1. Ernest, Margrave of Baden-Durlach
24. John IV, Count of Katzenelnbogen
12. Philip I, Count of Katzenelnbogen
25. Anne of Katzenelnbogen
6. Philip II of Katzenelnbogen
26. Eberhard IV, Count of Württemberg
13. Anna of Württemberg
27. Henriette of Mömpelgard
3. Ottilie of Katzenelnbogen
28. Engelbert I of Nassau
14. Henry II, Count of Nassau-Siegen
29. Johanna van Polanen
7. Ottilie of Nassau-Siegen
30. Rupert IV of Virneburg
15. Genoveva of Virneburg
31. Agnes of Solms-Braunfels

== See also ==
- Baden
- List of rulers of Baden

== Sources ==
- Hohkamp, Michaela (2007). "Sisters, Aunts, and Cousins: Familial Architectures and the Political Field in Early Modern Europe". In Sabean, David Warren; Teuscher, Simon; Mathieu, Jon (eds.). Kinship in Europe: Approaches to Long-Term Development (1300-1900). Berghahn books. pp. 91–104.
- Arthur Kleinschmidt (1877). "Ernst (Markgraf von Baden-Durlach)" . Allgemeine Deutsche Biographie (in German). Vol. 6. Leipzig: Duncker & Humblot. pp. 243–244.
- Friedrich Wielandt (1959). "Ernst, Markgraf von Baden-Durlach". Neue Deutsche Biographie (in German). Vol. 4. Berlin: Duncker & Humblot. pp. 605–606.
- "Entry". Zedlers Universallexikon. Vol. 8. p. 888.
- Johann Christian Sachs: Einleitung in die Geschichte der Marggravschaft und des marggrävlichen altfürstlichen Hauses Baden, Karlsruhe, 1770, part 4 at Google Books
- Pütter: Ueber Mißheirathen Teutscher Fürsten und Grafen, Göttingen, 1796, pp. 83–91
- Christoph Meiners, Ludwig Timotheus Spittler (eds.): Mark-Graf Ernst von Baden und Ursula von Rosenfeld, die Stamm-Eltern des noch blühenden Badischen Hauses, in: Göttingisches Historisches Magazin, vol. 4, Hanover, 1789, pp. 737–772 online
- Casimir Bumiller: Ursula von Rosenfeld und die Tragödie des Hauses Baden, Gernsbach, 2010, ISBN 978-3-938047-51-4
- Karl Seith: Das Markgräflerland und die Markgräfler im Bauernkrieg des Jahres 1525, Karlsruhe, 1926
- Johann David Köhler: Die sehr seltene Fürstl. Badenische Brüderliche Eintrachts-Medaille von A. 1533, in: Im Jahr 1729 wöchentlich herausgegegeber Historischer Münz-Belustigung, part 1, Nuremberg, 1729, pp. 361–368

Ernest, Margrave of Baden-Durlach House of Zähringen Born: 7 October 1482 Died: 6 February 1553
Preceded by Christopher I	Margrave of Baden; 1515–1533; With: Philip I and Bernhard III	Margraviate divided
New division	Margrave of Baden-Durlach; 1533–1553	Succeeded by Bernard IV
