= Philip I of Baden =

Margrave of Baden-Sponheim, Imperial governor

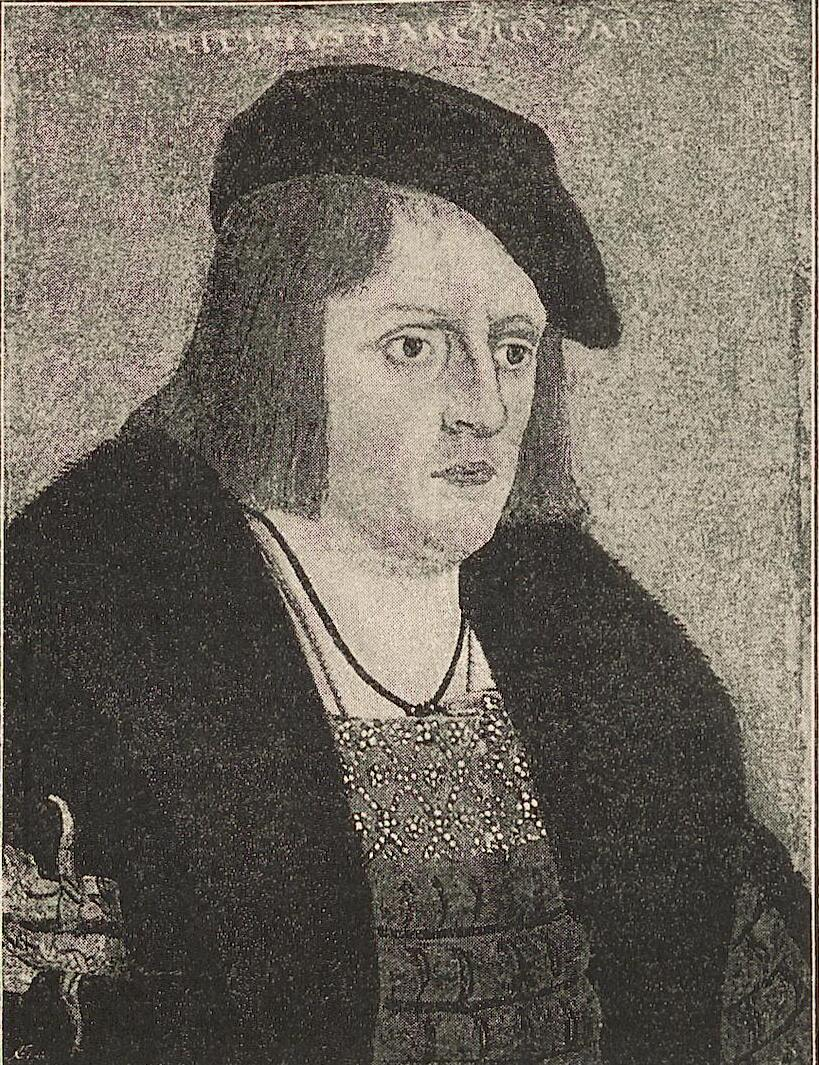
- Born: 6 November 1479
- Died: 17 September 1533 (aged 53)
- Burial: Baden-Baden
- Spouse: Elisabeth of the Palatinate
- Issue: 6, including Marie Jakobäa
- Father: Christopher I
- Mother: Ottilie of Katzenelnbogen

Margrave Philip I of Baden (6 November 1479 – 17 September 1533) took over the administration of his father's possessions Baden (Baden-Baden), Durlach, Pforzheim and Altensteig and parts of Eberstein, Lahr and Mahlberg in 1515 and ruled as governor until he inherited the territories in 1527. From 1524 till 1527, he also acted as an imperial governor in the second Imperial Government.
His official title was Margrave of Baden-Sponheim.

== Life ==
Philip was the fifth son of the Margrave Christopher I of Baden and Ottilie of Katzenelnbogen. His father intended to avoid splitting the inheritance and regarded Philip as his most capable son, so he wanted Philip to inherit the sovereignty over all his territories. He intended Philip to marry with Joan, the heiress of Margrave Philip of Hachberg-Sausenberg — a junior branch of the House of Baden branch line, so that Philip would become sovereign of a considerable territory. The plan failed due to resistance of the French king.

Because of the resistance of Philip's worldly brothers, Christopher later changed his will twice. Philip's brother Bernhard III inherited the holdings on the left bank of the Rhine, his brother Ernest inherited the baronies Hachberg, Usenberg, Sausenburg, Rötteln and Baden Castle in Badenweiler in South Baden.

Philip fought on the French side in the Italian Wars. In 1501 he commanded a ship in the French fleet, that supported the Venice in the war against the Turks.

During his reign, Philip was confronted a wave of rebellions all over southern Germany. In a continuation of the Bundschuh movement and again under the leadership of Joss Fritz the peasants stood up and fought for their rights. This often led to abuse and violence. The rebels marched through Durlach to the monastery Gottesaue, which was looted and completely destroyed — under the eyes of the Margrave. He responded by attacking the homes of the rebels and for example in Berghausen three houses were set on fire. The real aim, however, was the territory of the bishop George of Speyer, who finally escaped to the court of the Elector Palatine in Heidelberg. It wasn't until 1525 that Elector Louis V and his army managed to end the insurgency. On 25 May 1525, Philip I concluded the Treaty of Renchen with his peasants.

He died in 1533 without male heirs. Of his six children only his daughter Maria Jakobäa (1507–1580) survived him. In 1522, she married Duke William IV of Bavaria. His two brothers, Ernest and Bernhard III divided his estate among themselves — the resulting margraviates of Baden-Durlach and Baden-Baden were reunified in 1771.

== Grave ==
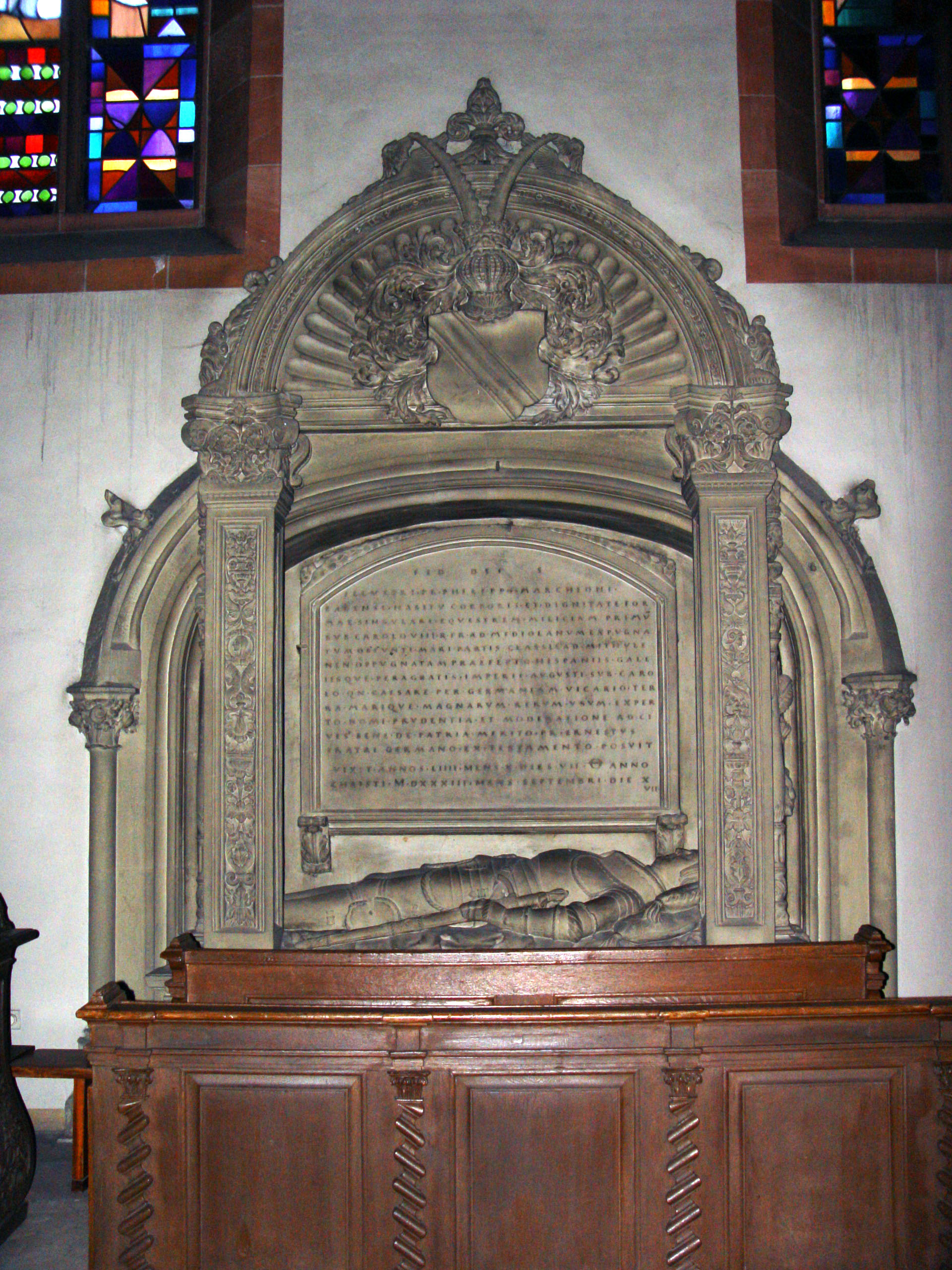
grave of Philip I of Baden

The grave of the Margrave Philip I of Baden is located in the Collegiate Church in Baden-Baden. His tomb is adorned with a life size sculpture in full armor, but without a helmet. The tomb bears the following Latin is inscription:

HALLOWED BY THE BELIEF IN GOD
THE ILLUSTRIOUS PRINCE PHILIP, MARGRAVE OF BADEN,
AN EXCELLENT PRINCE WITH A POWERFUL BODY AND A BEAUTIFUL SHAPE,
WHO BEGAN HIS CAREER AS KNIGHT WITH CHARLES VIII, KING OF FRANCE;
AT THE SIEGE OF MILAN
WHO COMMANDED PART OF THE FLEET AT THE SIEGE OF MITHYLENE
WHO TRAVELED SPAIN AND FRANCE,
WHO WAS GOVERNOR OF THE GERMAN EMPIRE DURING THE REIGN OF EMPEROR CHARLES V,
WHO ACHIEVED GREAT THINGS ON LAND AND ON WATER,
WHO DESERVED MERIT AT HOME WITH WISDOM AND MODERATION WRT THE CITIZENS
- TO HIM -
TO HIS VERY OWN BROTHER,
THIS WAS MONUMENT DEDICATED BY THE LAST WILL OF PRINCE ERNEST,
HE LIVED 54 YEARS 10 MONTHS 7 DAYS,
AND DIED IN 1533 ON SEPTEMBER 17.

The gravestone was created in 1537 by Christoph von Urach.

== Marriage and descendants ==
Margrave Philip I married on 3 January 1503 Elisabeth of the Palatinate (16 November 1483 – 24 June 1522), the daughter of the Elector Philip. The couple had the following children:

- Marie Jakobäa (25 June 1507 – 16 November 1580), married in 1522 Duke William IV of Bavaria (1493–1550)
- Philipp (1508–1509).
- Philipp Jakob (born and died 1511).
- Marie Eva (born and died 1513).
- Johann Adam (born and died 1516).
- Max Kaspar (born and died 1519).

== Ancestors ==
Ancestors of Philip I of Baden

16. Bernard I, Margrave of Baden-Baden
8. Jacob, Margrave of Baden-Baden
17. Anna of Oettingen
4. Charles I, Margrave of Baden-Baden
18. Charles II, Duke of Lorraine
9. Catherine de Lorraine
19. Margaret of the Palatinate
2. Christopher I, Margrave of Baden
20. Leopold III, Duke of Austria
10. Ernest, Duke of Austria
21. Viridis Visconti
5. Catherine of Austria
22. Siemowit IV of Masovia
11. Cymburgis of Masovia
23. Alexandra of Lithuania
1. Philip I, Margrave of Baden
24. John IV, Count of Katzenelnbogen
12. Philip I, Count of Katzenelnbogen
25. Anne of Katzenelnbogen
6. Philip II of Katzenelnbogen
26. Eberhard IV, Count of Württemberg
13. Anna of Württemberg
27. Henriette of Mömpelgard
3. Ottilie of Katzenelnbogen
28. Engelbert I of Nassau
14. Henry II, Count of Nassau-Siegen
29. Johanna van Polanen
7. Ottilie of Nassau-Siegen
30. Rupert IV of Virneburg
15. Genoveva of Virneburg
31. Agnes of Solms-Braunfels

== See also ==
- List of rulers of Baden

== Footnotes ==
Philip I of Baden House of Baden Born: 6 November 1479 Died: 17 September 1533
Preceded by Christopher I	Margrave of Baden; 1515–1533	Succeeded by Ernest as Margrave of Baden-Durlach
Preceded by Christopher I	Margrave of Baden; 1515–1533	Succeeded by Bernhard III as Margrave of Baden-Baden
