= Leonhard von Eck =

Bavarian nobleman and chancellor (1480–1550)

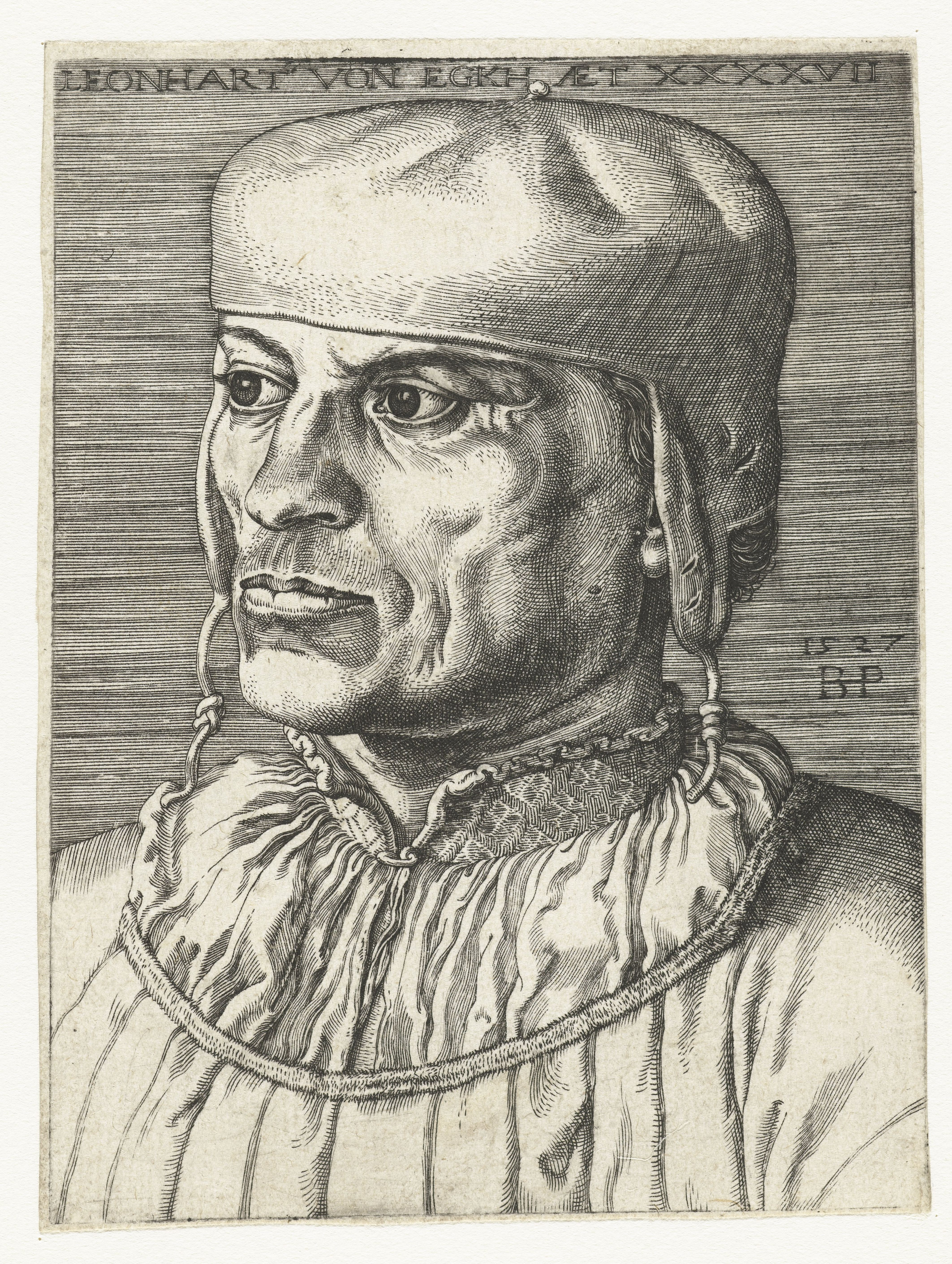
Portrait of Dr. Leonhard von Eck in the State Museums of Prussian Cultural Heritage, Berlin. Copper engraving print

Leonhard von Eck (1480-1550) was a Bavarian nobleman who served as chancellor of Bavaria for thirty years. He was Chancellor to William IV, Duke of Bavaria, and a powerful opponent of the Reformation.

Leonhard von Eck was born in 1480 in Kelheim, a town on the River Danube.

Von Eck attended the universities of Ingolstadt and Siena where he obtained an MA degree and a doctorate of laws. He returned to Germany and was appointed tutor to William IV.

In 1519 became the chancellor of Bavaria, a position he held for the next 30 years.

In 1520 he married Felicitas von Freyberg, the widow of Dietrich von Plieningen, whose library he inherited.

Leonhard died in Munich on 17 March 1550 and was buried in his hometown of Kelheim.
