= Jakobea of Baden =

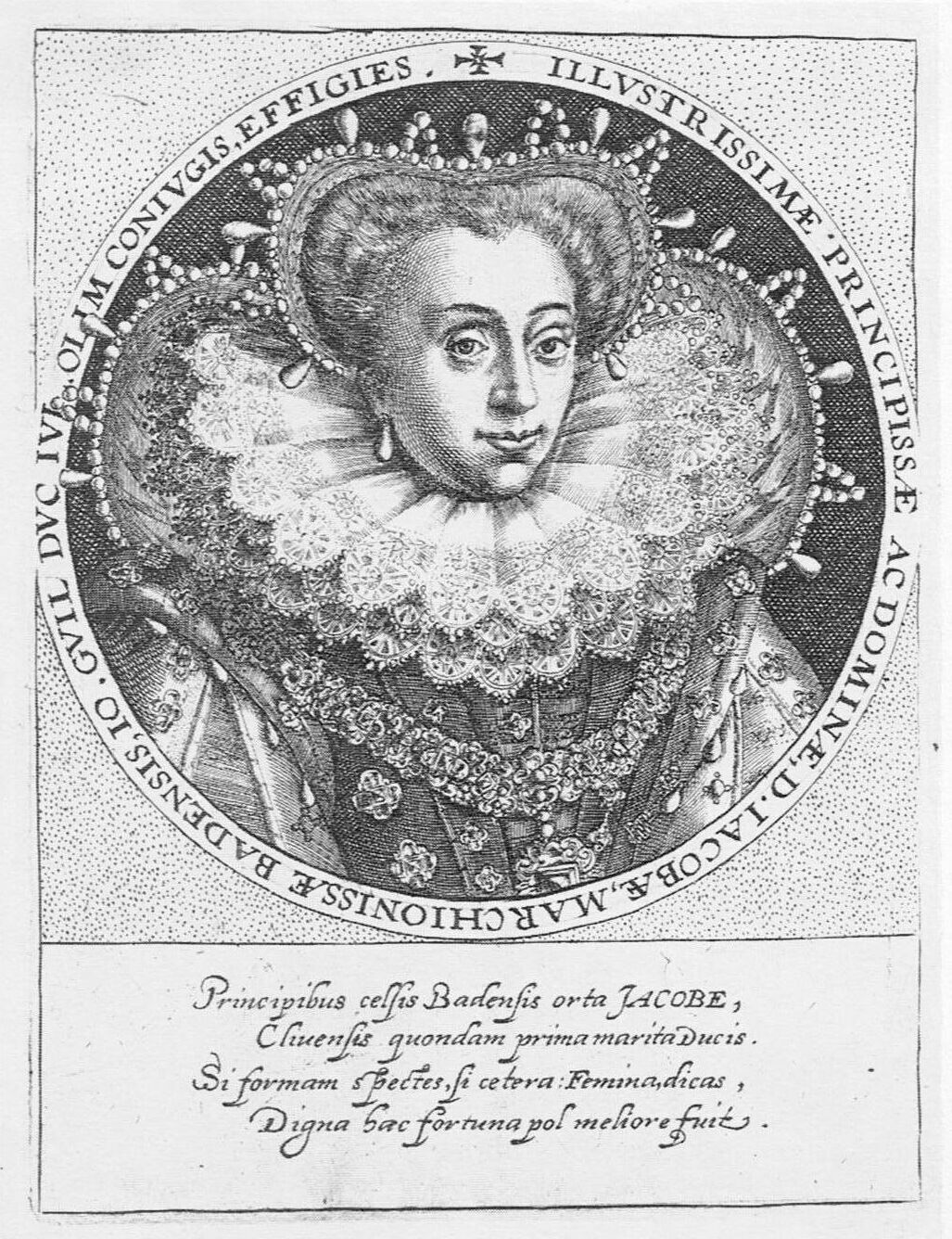
- Jakobea of Baden, posthumous engraving, c. 1600
- Born: 16 January 1558
- Died: 3 September 1597 (aged 39); Düsseldorf
- Buried: Kreuzherren Church in Düsseldorf
- Noble family: Zähringen
- Spouse: John William, Duke of Jülich-Cleves-Berg
- Father: Philibert, Margrave of Baden-Baden
- Mother: Mechthild of Bavaria

Princess Jakobea of Baden (16 January 1558 – 3 September 1597 in Düsseldorf, buried in the St. Lambert Church in Düsseldorf) was daughter of the Margrave Philibert of Baden-Baden and Mechthild of Bavaria.

John William, Duke of Jülich-Cleves-Berg

== Life ==
Jakobea of Baden-Baden became an orphan at an early age and was raised at the court of her maternal uncle Duke Albert V of Bavaria, where she had several suitors. At the insistence of her cousin Ernest of Bavaria, who was Archbishop of Cologne, Emperor Rudolph II, King Philip II of Spain and Pope Gregory XIII, she married, on 16 June 1585, to Duke John William of Jülich-Cleves-Berg, who was considered physically unattractive and mentally unstable and was the son and heir apparent of William "the Rich" of Jülich-Cleves-Berg, in an attempt to keep the confessionally wavering duke William in the Catholic camp. The marriage was celebrated lavishly in Düsseldorf, which at the time was ravaged by the Cologne War, and was documented by Dietrich Graminäus in his volume Beschreibung derer Fürstlicher Güligscher ec. Hochzeit.

William the Rich could never overcome the early death of his eldest son Charles Frederick. He despised his second son and successor, John William, and gave him little chance to learn to govern and thus contributed to the disaster that befell his duchies.

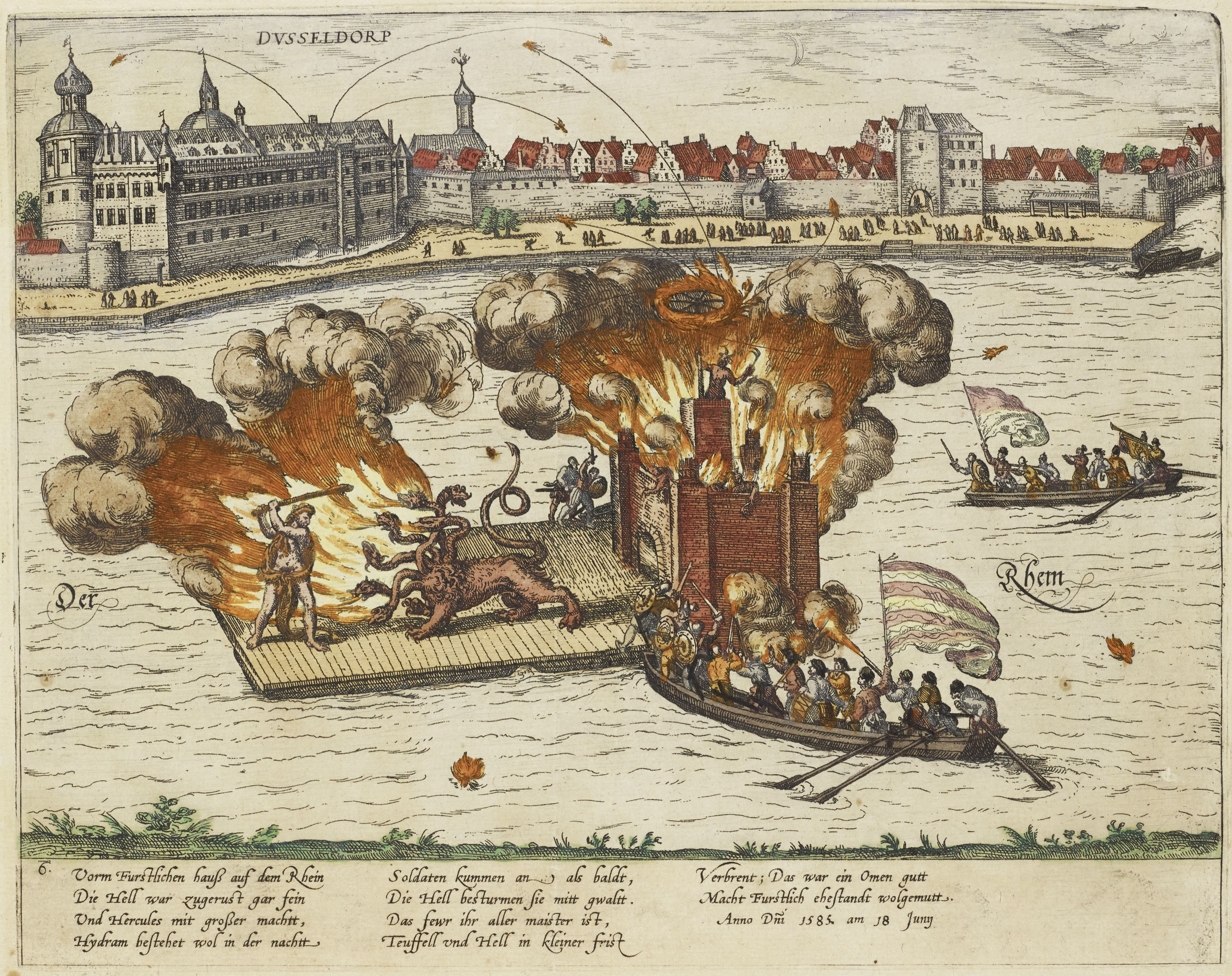
Spectacle on the Rhine: The deeds of Hercules with fireworks; in the background Düsseldorf Castle, picture from the aforementioned volume by Graminäus

When William died in 1592, John William inherited the duchies and Jakobea tried to rule on behalf of her husband, who had been locked up because of his temper tantrums. She had been born a Protestant, but was raised as a Roman Catholic and did not choose for either side. She never became pregnant, possibly because her husband was impotent. She had a relationship with the much younger Dietrich von Hall zu Ophoven, who was Amtmann at Monheim am Rhein and was eventually arrested and locked up in the tower of Düsseldorf Castle. She tried to plead her case in the Roman Rota and at the imperial court in Prague, but the case made little progress. The Catholic side, represented primarily by her sister-in-law Sibylle of Jülich-Cleves-Berg, then took matters into their own hands.

She was found dead in her room on the morning of 3 September 1597, after she had received guests and toasted on her husband's health the night before. Eyewitness accounts suggest that she was strangled or suffocated. The motive for the move appears to have been to make room for a more fertile wife, who could save the endangered dynasty.

She was buried on 10 September 1597 in a closed ceremony in the Kreuzherren Church in Düsseldorf. On 23 March 1820, her body was transferred to the St. Lambert Church in Düsseldorf and solemnly reburied.

The City Museum in Düsseldorf has a lock of her hair.

== Legacy ==
Comparing Jakobea to Mary Stuart is not entirely far-fetched; even so, it may be an exaggeration. Jakobea of Baden was overwhelmed by the confusing conditions at the religiously divided court in Düsseldorf and fled in a love affair for some amusement. When she was held in humiliating captivity and lost all hope of help from her powerful relatives in Baden and Bavaria, she showed her true caliber and attitude. The popular misinformation that Jakobea of Baden was beheaded, would make her more similar to Mary Stuart.
