= Joß Fritz =

German serf and insurgent (c. 1470–1525)

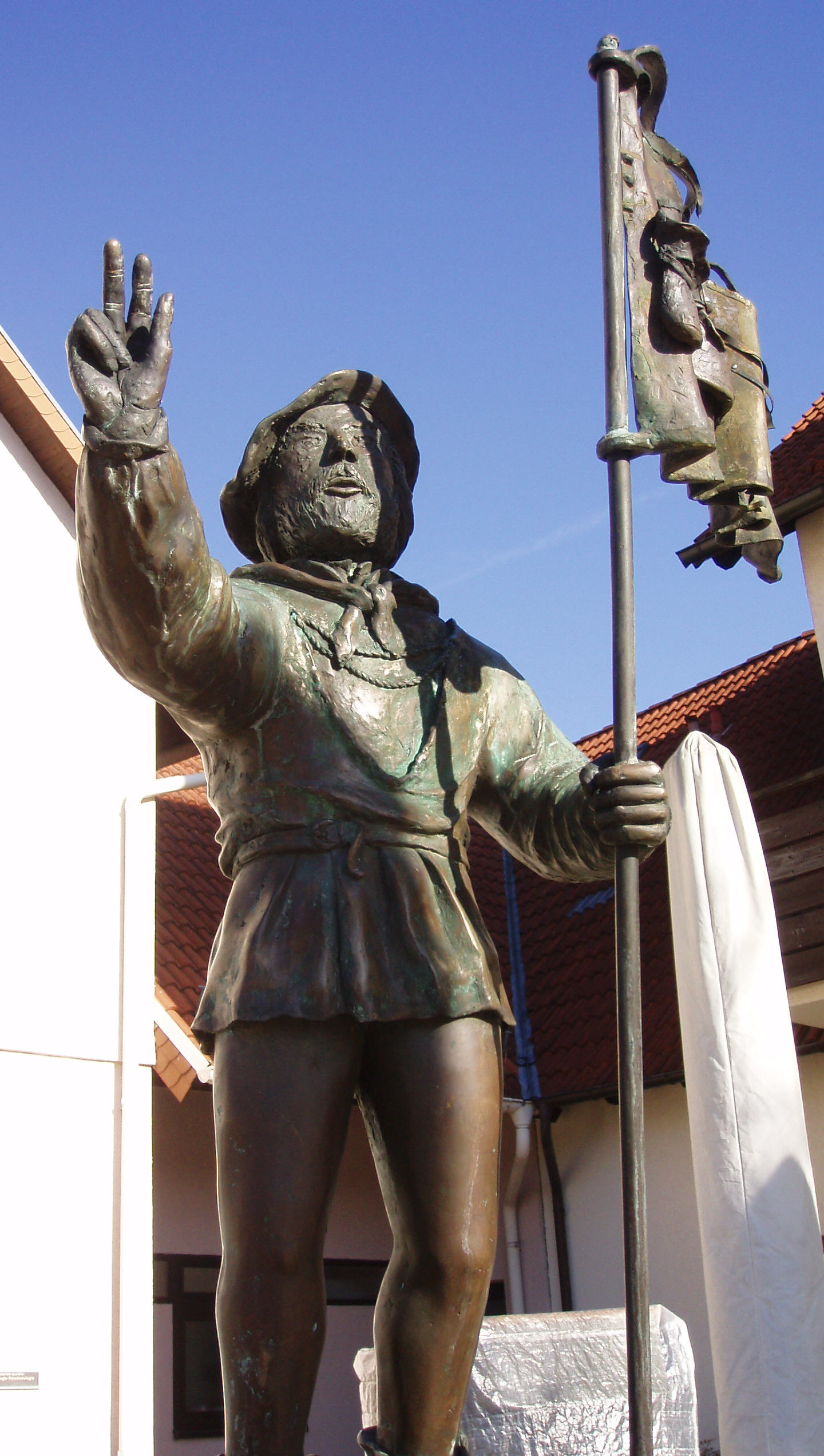
Joss Fritz, Untergrombach

Joss Fritz (c. 1470 – c. 1525) was a notable German insurgent, born as a serf in Untergrombach, Bruchsal. His full name was Joseph Fritz.

In 1512, Fritz emerged as a leader in a progressive series of rebellions aimed at liberating peasants from local feudal and ecclesiastical rule. These uprisings were initially sparked by Hans Boheim in 1476, with further revolts in 1493 and 1501. Fritz was described as

a soldier of commanding presence and great natural eloquence, used to battle and above all to patience. He was one of those who had escaped being quartered. His banner was blue silk with a white cross, and underneath the motto, "O Lord, help the righteous." Fritz was the William Tell of his times. No wonder his name is a favorite one among the Germans.

— J. H. Ward.

Fritz was active in the Upper Rhine area, orchestrating at least three major Bundschuh revolts in 1502, 1512, and 1519. Despite his efforts, these insurrections were quelled before they could fully manifest, primarily due to betrayals by his fellow conspirators.
