= Bernhard III of Baden-Baden =

Bernhard III
- Margrave of Baden-Baden
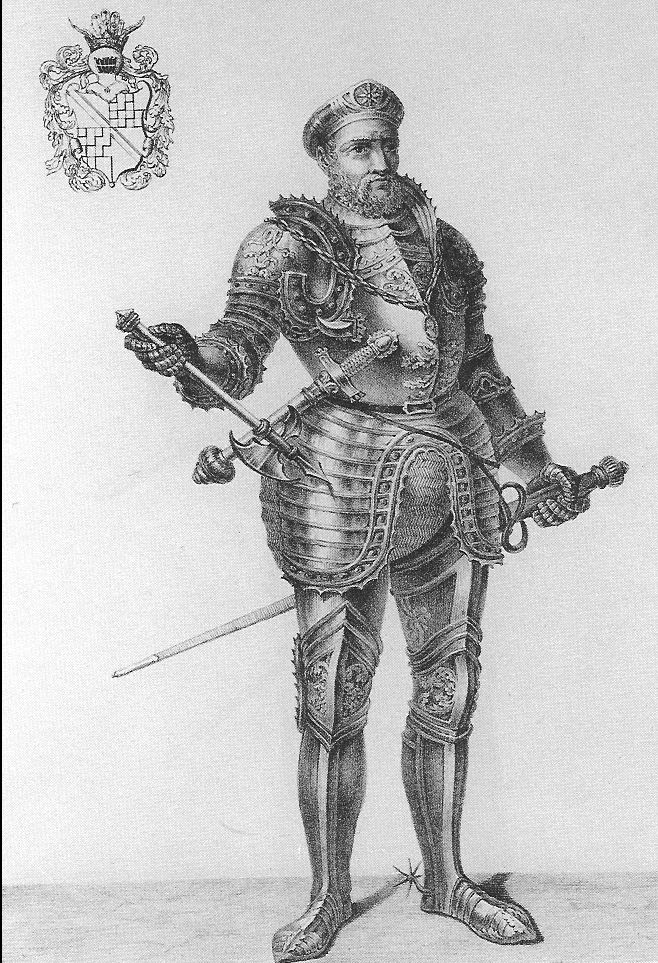
- Margrave Bernhard III of Baden-Baden
- Born: 7 October 1474
- Died: 29 June 1536 (aged 61)
- Noble family: Zähringen
- Spouse: Franziska of Luxemburg
- Issue: Philibert; Christopher
- Father: Christopher I, Margrave of Baden-Baden
- Mother: Ottilie of Katzenelnbogen

Bernhard III, Margrave of Baden-Baden (7 October 1474 – 29 June 1536) inherited in 1515 part of his father's margraviate of Baden. He ruled his part from 1515 until 1536.

His two brothers, Ernest and Philip inherited the other parts; after Philip died, he and Ernest each inherited half of Philip's part. This created two lines of rulers:

- "Bernhardine line" (Catholic) ruled Baden-Baden
- "Ernestine line" (Protestant) ruled Baden-Durlach

The Bernhardine line died out in 1771, allowing Margrave Charles Frederick of the Ernestine line to reunite the Margraviate of Baden.

Bernard was brought up at the court of Emperor Maximilian I and went to Spain with his friend, Maximilian's son Philip I. Philip was appointed King of Spain in 1504.

Margrave Bernhard tended in his later years to Protestantism and introduced the Reformation into the upper Margraviate.

== Marriage and issue ==
Bernhard III married in 1535, two years before his death, Franziska of Luxemburg, Countess of Brienne and Ligny (d. 17 June 1566), the daughter of Charles I, Count of Ligny. They had two sons; the younger, Christopher, was born after Bernard's death:

- Philibert (born: 22 January 1536, died: 3 October 1569)
- Christopher (born: 26 February 1537; died: 2 August 1575)

Bernhard, however, had numerous extra-marital children, of whom six sons (Bernard, Philip, John, George, Caspar, and Melchior) are known. In 1532, Emperor Charles V declared George, Caspar and Melchior to be legitimate princes, and later, Bernhard and Philip as well. These sons were not entitled to inherit, but they received a maintenance payment after their father's death.

== Ancestors ==
Ancestors of Bernhard III of Baden-Baden

16. Bernard I, Margrave of Baden-Baden
8. Jacob, Margrave of Baden-Baden
17. Anna of Oettingen
4. Charles I, Margrave of Baden-Baden
18. Charles II, Duke of Lorraine
9. Catherine de Lorraine
19. Margaret of the Palatinate
2. Christopher I, Margrave of Baden
20. Leopold III, Duke of Austria
10. Ernest, Duke of Austria
21. Viridis Visconti
5. Catherine of Austria
22. Siemowit IV of Masovia
11. Cymburgis of Masovia
23. Alexandra of Lithuania
1. Bernhard, Margrave of Baden-Baden
24. John IV, Count of Katzenelnbogen
12. Philip I, Count of Katzenelnbogen
25. Anne of Katzenelnbogen
6. Philip II of Katzenelnbogen
26. Eberhard IV, Count of Württemberg
13. Anna of Württemberg
27. Henriette of Mömpelgard
3. Ottilie of Katzenelnbogen
28. Engelbert I of Nassau
14. Henry II, Count of Nassau-Siegen
29. Johanna van Polanen
7. Ottilie of Nassau-Siegen
30. Rupert IV of Virneburg
15. Genoveva of Virneburg
31. Agnes of Solms-Braunfels

== See also ==
- Baden
- List of rulers of Baden

== References and sources ==
- Friedrich von Weech (1875). "Bernhard III., Markgraf von Baden" . Allgemeine Deutsche Biographie (in German). Vol. 2. Leipzig: Duncker & Humblot. p. 416.
- Johann Christian Sachs: Einleitung in die Geschichte der Marggravschaft und des marggrävlichen altfürstlichen Hauses Baden, Karlsruhe 1764–1770, vol. 3, p. 195–214

== Footnotes ==
Bernhard III of Baden-Baden House of Zähringen Born: 7 October 1474 Died: 29 June 1536
Preceded by Christopher I	Margrave of Baden; 1515–1533 with Ernest and Philip	Margraviate divided into Baden-Baden and Baden-Durlach
New division	Margrave of Baden-Baden; 1533–1536	Succeeded by Philibert
