= Bundschuh movement =

1493–1517 peasant uprisings in southwestern Germany

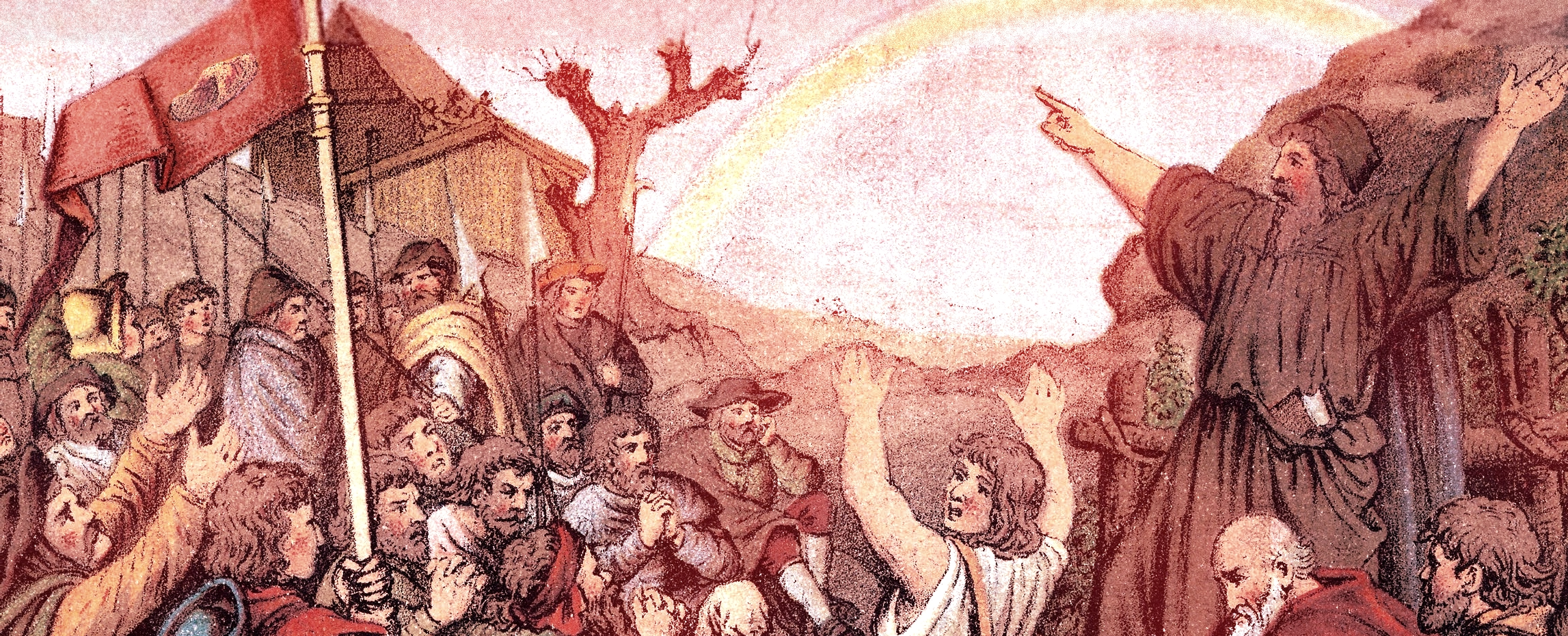
Painting depicting rebellious peasants with the Bunschuh ("tied shoe") banner, GDR, 1949-1991.

In German history, the Bundschuh movement (German: Bundschuh-Bewegung) refers to a series of localized peasant rebellions in the Kingdom of Germany's southwest from 1493 to 1517. They were one of the causes of the German Peasants' War (1524–1525). The Bundschuh movement was not a movement in the proper sense, but a number of loosely linked local conspiracies and planned uprisings. It was so called because of the tied peasant shoe (Bundschuh) the peasants displayed on their flag. Under this flag, peasants and city dwellers had defeated the troops of the French count of Armagnac along the Upper Rhine in 1439, 1443, and 1444.

Bundschuhfahne with the Bundschuh emblem.

Individual uprisings – seeking relief from oppressive taxes, arbitrary justice systems, high debts, costly ecclesiastic privileges, serfdom, prohibitions on hunting and fishing, and the like – occurred in 1476 in Niklashausen (Tauber valley), in 1493 in Schlettstadt (now Sélestat)/Alsace, for the first time under the Bundschuh banner), in 1502 in Bruchsal and Untergrombach, in 1513 in Lehen (Breisgau), and in 1517 along the Upper Rhine. Each of these was defeated very quickly, and the leaders, such as Joß Fritz, were generally executed.

== Bundschuh ==
As a sign displayed on their flag the peasants chose the Bundschuh (=tied shoe), a leather shoe typical of peasants. It was to symbolise the joint rising and advance of the peasants against their lords. It also contrasted the boots worn by knights with their spurs.
