= Elisabeth of the Palatinate, Landgravine of Hesse =

German noble

Elizabeth of the Palatinate
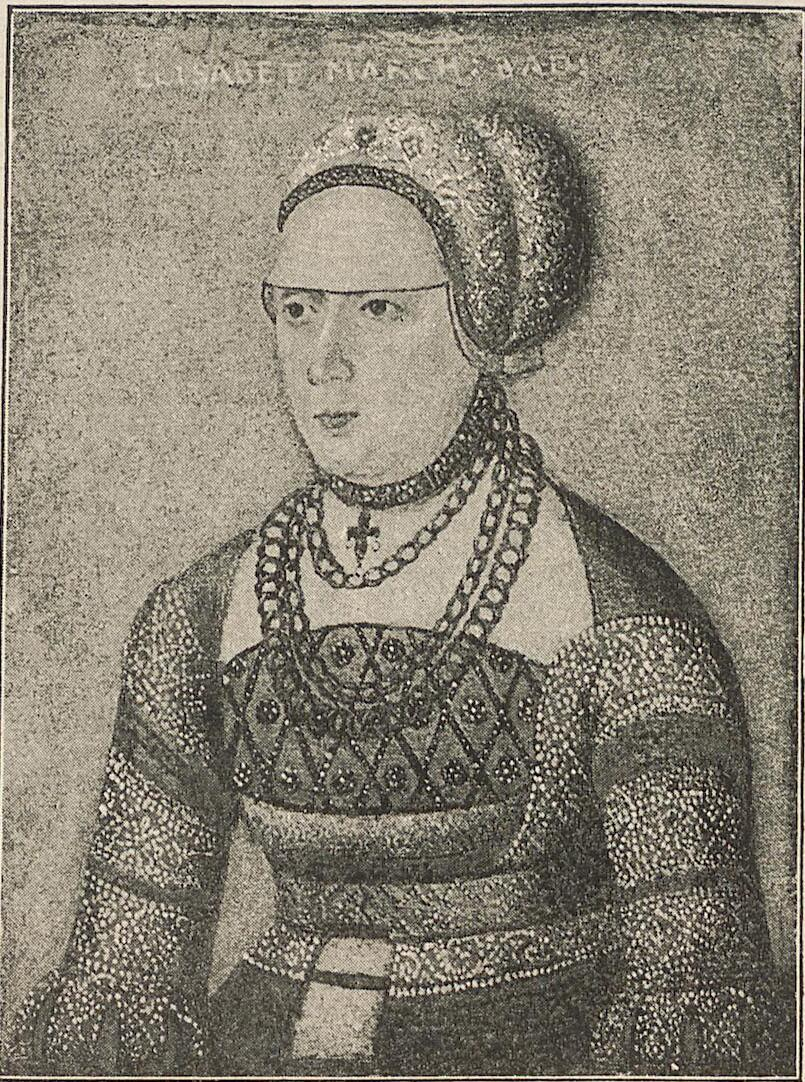
- Born: 16 November 1483; Heidelberg
- Died: 24 June 1522 (aged 38); Baden-Baden
- Spouse: William III, Landgrave of Hesse; Philip I, Margrave of Baden
- Issue: 6, including Marie Jakobäa
- House: House of Wittelsbach
- Father: Philip, Elector Palatine
- Mother: Margaret of Bavaria

Elizabeth of the Palatinate (16 November 1483 in Heidelberg – 24 June 1522 in Baden-Baden) was a member of the House of Wittelsbach and a Countess Palatine of Simmern and by marriage, successively Landgravine of Hesse-Marburg and Margravine of Baden.

== Life ==
Elizabeth was a daughter of the elector Philip (1448–1508) from his marriage to Margaret of Bavaria (1456–1501), daughter of Duke Louis IX. of Bavaria-Landshut.

She first married on February 12, 1496, in Heidelberg with Landgrave William III of Hesse-Marburg (1471–1500). The nuptials took place in 1498 in Frankfurt am Main. The marriage tied William III closer to the Palatinate house while his cousins in Kassel were considered to be partisans of the Emperor. In the event he would die without an heir, William had promised Elizabeth almost the entire county of Katzenelnbogen as wittum. However, when William III died, his whole territory, including Katzenelnbogen, was inherited by his cousin William II of Hesse-Kassel. The Palatinate party then proposed that Elisabeth should marry William II. William declined, and married a princess close to the House of Habsburg. William II also participated in the imperial ban against Elisabeth's father and brother, because of the dispute over Elisabeth's wittum.

Three years after the death of her first husband Elisabeth married on January 3, 1503, in Heidelberg with Margrave Philip I of Baden-Sponheim (1479–1533). In a contract concluded in 1508 with respect to Elizabeth's dowry, it was stipulated that the part of Sponheim that Baden had ceded to the Palatinate in 1463, was to be returned to Baden.

Elizabeth died on June 14, 1522, and was buried in the Collegiate Church in Baden-Baden.

== Offspring ==
From her second marriage to Margrave Philip of Baden Elisabeth had the following children:

- Marie Jakobäa (1507–1580)

married in 1522 Duke William IV of Bavaria (1493–1550)

- Philipp (1508–1509)
- Philipp Jakob (died 1511)
- Eva Marie (died 1513)
- Johann Adam (died 1516)
- Max Kaspar (died 1519)
