= Ottilie of Katzenelnbogen =

Margravine of Baden-Baden

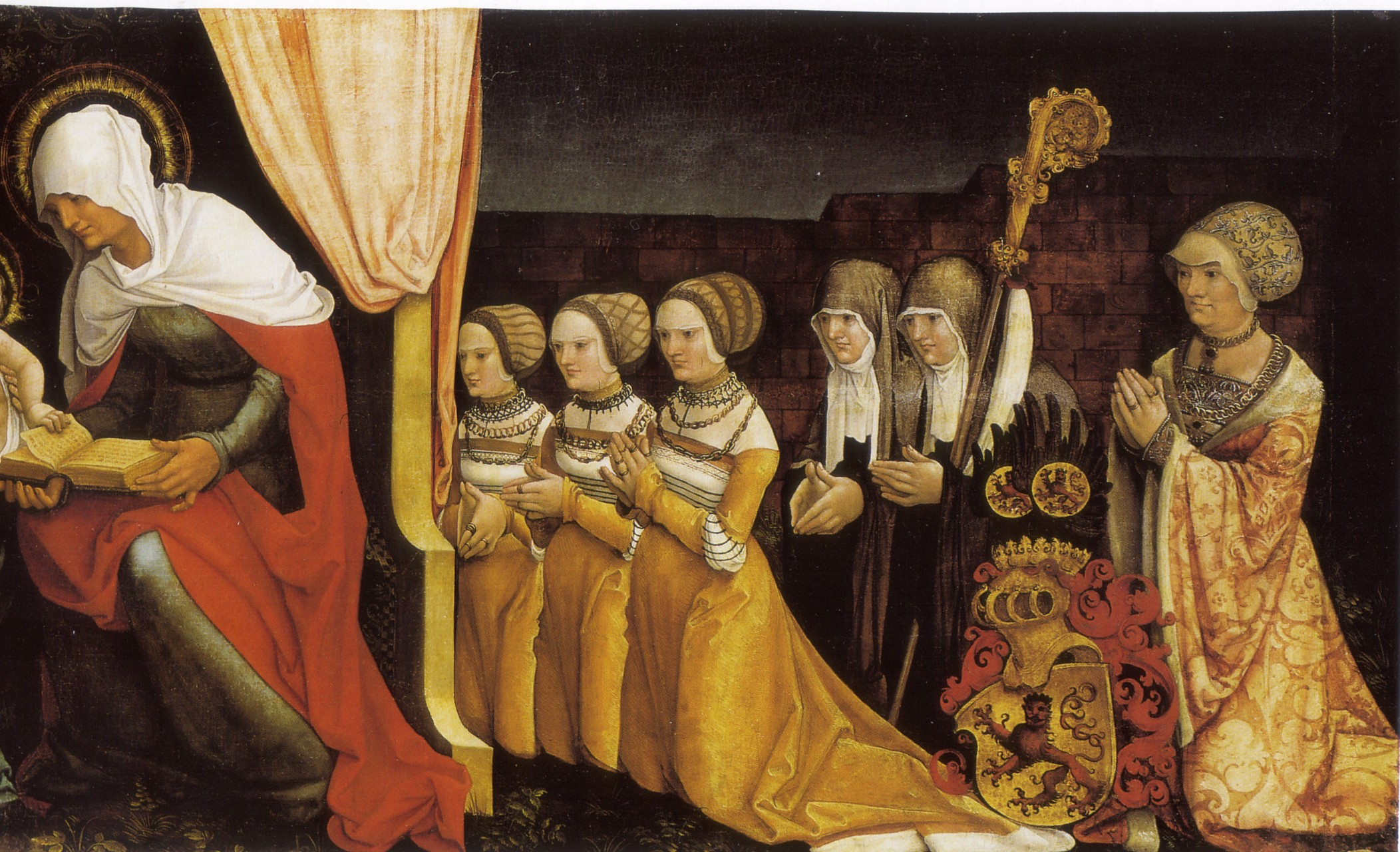
- Ottilie and her five daughters, section of the Markgrafentafel.
- Born: c. 1451
- Died: 15 August 1517; Baden-Baden
- Spouse: Christoph I of Baden
- Father: Philipp II ''the Younger'' of Katzenelnbogen
- Mother: Ottilie of Nassau-Siegen

Ottilie of Katzenelnbogen (c. 1451 – 15 August 1517, Baden-Baden), was by marriage Margravine of Baden-Baden.

== Life ==
She was the only child of Philipp II ''the Younger'' of Katzenelnbogen (1427 – 27 February 1453) and Ottilie of Nassau-Siegen (April 1437 – July 1493), the only daughter of Henry II of Nassau-Siegen and his first wife Genoveva of Virneburg. Her baptism took place one month after her father's death, on 22 March in Starkenburg Castle, near Darmstadt.

Philipp II the Younger was in turn the eldest of the two sons of Count Philipp I of Katzenelnbogen the Elder (1402 – 1479) and his first wife, Anna of Württemberg (1408 – 1471).

Shortly after Ottilie's uncle and last male member of the family, Eberhard of Katzenelnbogen was murdered (1456), her grandfather Philipp I made an agreement with Frederick I, Elector Palatine, under which Ottilie was betrothed with the Elector's nephew Philip; however, when she reached a marriageable age in 1467, eleven years after the engagement, the groom refused to marry her for personal reasons. Instead, and thanks to the intrigues of John II of Baden, Elector and Archbishop of Trier, she was engaged with his nephew Christoph, heir of Baden-Baden. The marriage contract was signed on 20 June 1468, and the formal wedding ceremony took place seven months later, on 30 January 1469 in the city of Koblenz as a part of double ceremony, because that day Christoph's sister Cimburga married with Count Engelbert II of Nassau-Dillenburg (first-cousin of Ottilie's mother). Only two years later, before 13 January 1471, Ottilie of Nassau-Dillenburg, Dowager Hereditary Countess of Katzenelnbogen remarried, with Count Oswald of Thierstein (1435 - end June 1488) and three years later, on 24 January 1474, Anna of Nassau-Dillenburg, Engelbert II's sister, married with Count Philipp I of Katzenelnbogen the Elder as her second wife.

Ottilie's dowry was the highest of the Middle Ages ever introduced into the House of Baden. In addition to the Stadeck Castle with all his accessories (about 26,000 florins) were added further 48,000 longer-dated guilders. The total amount was of about 80,000 florins.

The marriage between Ottilie and her husband is described as happy. They had 15 children between 1470 and 1493, of whom 13 reached adulthood:

1. Ottilie (6 June 1470 – 1490), Abbess in Pforzheim.
2. Jakob (6 June 1471 – 27 April 1511, Cologne), Archbishop of Trier.
3. Marie (2 July 1473 – 9 January 1519); Abbess in Lichtenthal.
4. Bernhard III (7 April 1474 – 29 June 1536), Margrave of Baden-Baden.
5. Charles (21 June 1476 – 7 October 1510), canon in Strasbourg and Trier.
6. Christoph (21 July 1477 – 29 March 1508), canon in Strasbourg and Trier.
7. Philipp I (10 December 1478 – 17 September 1533), Margrave of Baden-Sponheim.
8. Rudolf (16 June 1481 – 23 September 1532), canon in Mainz, Cologne, Strasbourg and Augsburg.
9. Ernst (7 October 1482 – 6 February 1553), Margrave of Baden-Durlach.
10. Wolfgang (10 May 1484 – 24 June 1522).
11. Sibylle (26 April 1485 – 10 July 1518), married on 24 January 1505 to Philipp III, Count of Hanau-Lichtenberg.
12. Rosine (5 March 1487 – 29 October 1554), married firstly in 1503 to Count Franz Wolfgang of Hohenzollern and secondly on 17 December 1526 to Baron Johann von Ow zu Wachendorf.
13. Johann (born and died 19 June 1490).
14. Beatrix (22 January 1492 – 4 April 1535), married in 1508 to John II, Count Palatine of Simmern.
15. Georg (1 July 1493 – 16 November 1493).

After Ottilie's grandfather died in 1479, began a dispute with her aunt's husband, Henry III, Landgrave of Upper Hesse for her share in the Katzenelnbogen possessions, which were previously negotiated in Ottilie's marriage contract. After lengthy negotiations, was made a settlement between both parties, in which the Margrave of Baden-Baden received a sum of 4,000 florins in exchange of the formal renunciation of his wife's claims. When Ottilie's cousin William III, Landgrave of Hesse died in 1500, she received another 12,000 guilders as monetary compensation, so in March 1501 the House of Baden finally waived their claims over the County of Katzenelenbogen.

Ottilie died on 15 August 1517 in Baden-Baden and was buried in the local Collegiate Church. Her bronze Epitaph shows an image of her with the coats of arms of Württemberg and Katzenelnbogen at her feet.

== See also ==
- List of consorts of Baden
