= William IV of Bavaria =

Duke of Bavaria (1493–1550)

William IV
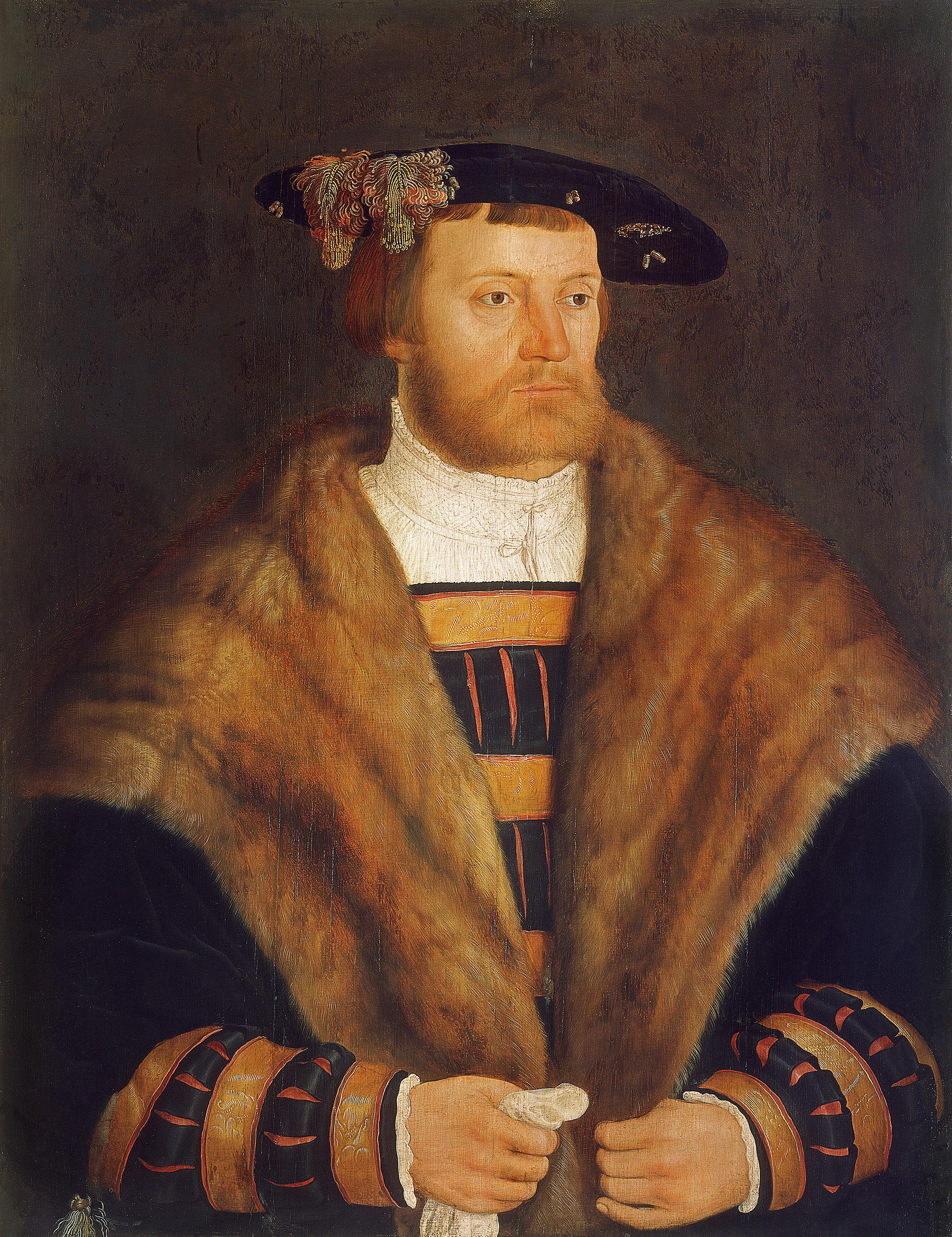

Duke of Bavaria
- Reign: 18 March 1508 – 7 March 1550
- Predecessor: Albert IV
- Successor: Albert V
- Co-ruler: Louis X (1516–1545)
- Born: 13 November 1493; Munich
- Died: 7 March 1550 (aged 56); Munich
- Burial: Munich Frauenkirche
- Spouse: Jakobaea of Baden
- Issue: Albert V, Duke of Bavaria; Mechthild of Bavaria
- House: House of Wittelsbach
- Father: Albert IV, Duke of Bavaria
- Mother: Kunigunde of Austria
- Religion: Roman Catholicism

William IV (German: Wilhelm IV; 13 November 1493 – 7 March 1550) was Duke of Bavaria from 1508 to 1550, until 1545 together with his younger brother Louis X, Duke of Bavaria. He was born in Munich to Albert IV and Kunigunde of Austria, a daughter of Emperor Frederick III.

== Political activity ==
Though William's father, Albert IV, had determined the everlasting succession of the firstborn prince in 1506, his younger brother Louis refused a spiritual career with the argument that he was born before the edict became valid. With support of his mother and the States-General, Louis forced William to accept him as co-regent in 1516. Louis then ruled the districts of Landshut and Straubing, in general in concord with his brother.

William initially sympathized with the Reformation but changed his mind as it grew more popular in Bavaria. In 1522 William issued the first Bavarian religion mandate, banning the promulgation of Martin Luther's works. After an agreement with Pope Clement VII in 1524 William became a political leader of the German Counter-Reformation, although he remained in opposition to the Habsburgs since his brother Louis X claimed the Bohemian crown. Both dukes also suppressed the peasant uprising in South Germany in an alliance with the Prince-Archbishop of Salzburg in 1525.

The conflict with Habsburg ended in 1534 when both dukes reached an agreement with Ferdinand I in Linz. William then supported Charles V in his war against the Schmalkaldic League in 1546, but however did not succeed in preserving the Palatine electoral dignity. William's chancellor for 35 years was the forceful Leonhard von Eck.

== Cultural activity ==
On 23 April 1516, before a committee consisting of gentry and knights in Ingolstadt, William issued his famous purity regulation for the brewing of Bavarian Beer, stating that only barley, hops, and water could be used. This regulation remained in force until it was abolished as a binding obligation in 1986 by Paneuropean regulations of the European Union.

In 1523 with the appointment of Ludwig Senfl began the rise of the Bavarian State Orchestra. Of particular importance is the Eckbibel Johann Eck wrote on behalf of William, a biblical translation from 1537, which is theologically directly against Luther and therefore belongs to the Catholic correction bibles. It is also significant in terms of linguistics because it is not written in the East German Saxon, but in Bavarian Upper German.

William was a significant collector and commissioner of art. Among other works he commissioned an important suite of paintings from various artists, including the Battle of Issus by Albrecht Altdorfer. This, like most of William's collection, is now housed in the Alte Pinakothek in Munich. With his order to expand the Neuveste with the so-called Rundstubenbau and to set up the first Court Garden began the history of the Munich Residenz as a representative palace. To the history cycle of the garden pavilion belonged Albrecht Altdorfer's painting. In 1546, he and his son Albert V ordered the construction of Dachau Palace from a Gothic ruin into a Renaissance style four-winged palace with a court garden which later became the favored residence of the rulers of Bavaria.

William died in 1550 in Munich and was succeeded by his son Albert. He is buried in the Frauenkirche in Munich.

== Family and children ==
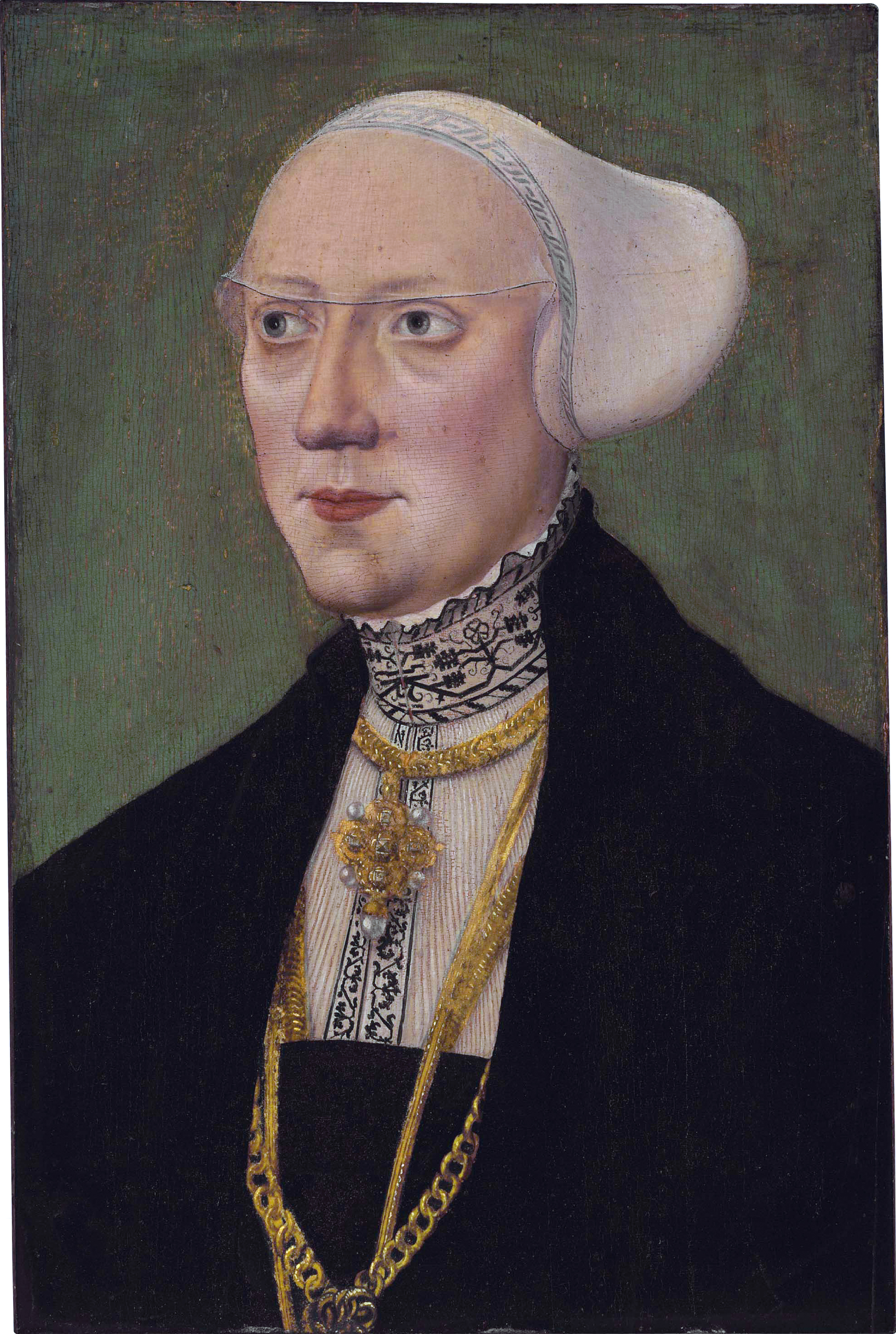
William's wife Marie of Baden-Sponheim (portrait by Hans Schöpfer the Elder)

In 1522 William married Jakobaea of Baden (1507–1580), a daughter of Margrave Philip I of Baden and his consort Princess Elisabeth of Palatinate; they had four children:

1. Theodor of Bavaria (10 February 1526 – 8 July 1534)
2. Duke Albert V of Bavaria (1528–1579)
3. Wilhelm of Bavaria (17 February 1529 – 22 October 1530)
4. Mechthild of Bavaria (12 July 1532 – 2 November 1565), married in 1557 Philibert of Baden (1536–1569)

== Ancestors ==
Ancestors of William IV of Bavaria

16. John II, Duke of Bavaria
8. Ernest, Duke of Bavaria
17. Catherine of Gorizia
4. Albert III, Duke of Bavaria
18. Bernabò Visconti
9. Elisabetta Visconti
19. Beatrice Regina della Scala
2. Albert IV, Duke of Bavaria
20. Albert I, Duke of Brunswick-Grubenhagen
10. Eric I, Duke of Brunswick-Grubenhagen
21. Agnes of Brunswick-Lüneburg
5. Anna of Brunswick-Grubenhagen-Einbeck
22. Otto I, Duke of Brunswick-Göttingen
11. Elisabeth of Brunswick-Göttingen
23. Margarethe of Jülich-Berg
1. William IV, Duke of Bavaria
24. Leopold III, Duke of Austria
12. Ernest, Duke of Austria
25. Viridis Visconti
6. Frederick III, Holy Roman Emperor
26. Siemowit IV, Duke of Masovia
13. Cymburgis of Masovia
27. Alexandra of Lithuania
3. Kunigunde of Austria
28. John I of Portugal
14. Edward of Portugal
29. Philippa of Lancaster
7. Eleanor of Portugal, Holy Roman Empress
30. Ferdinand I of Aragon
15. Eleonor of Aragon
31. Eleanor of Alburquerque

William IV of Bavaria House of Wittelsbach Born: 13 November 1493 Died: 7 March 1550
Regnal titles
Preceded by Albert IV	Duke of Bavaria; 1508–1550	Succeeded by Albert V
