= Christopher I of Baden =

Margrave of Baden from 1475 to 1515

Christopher I
- Margrave of Baden
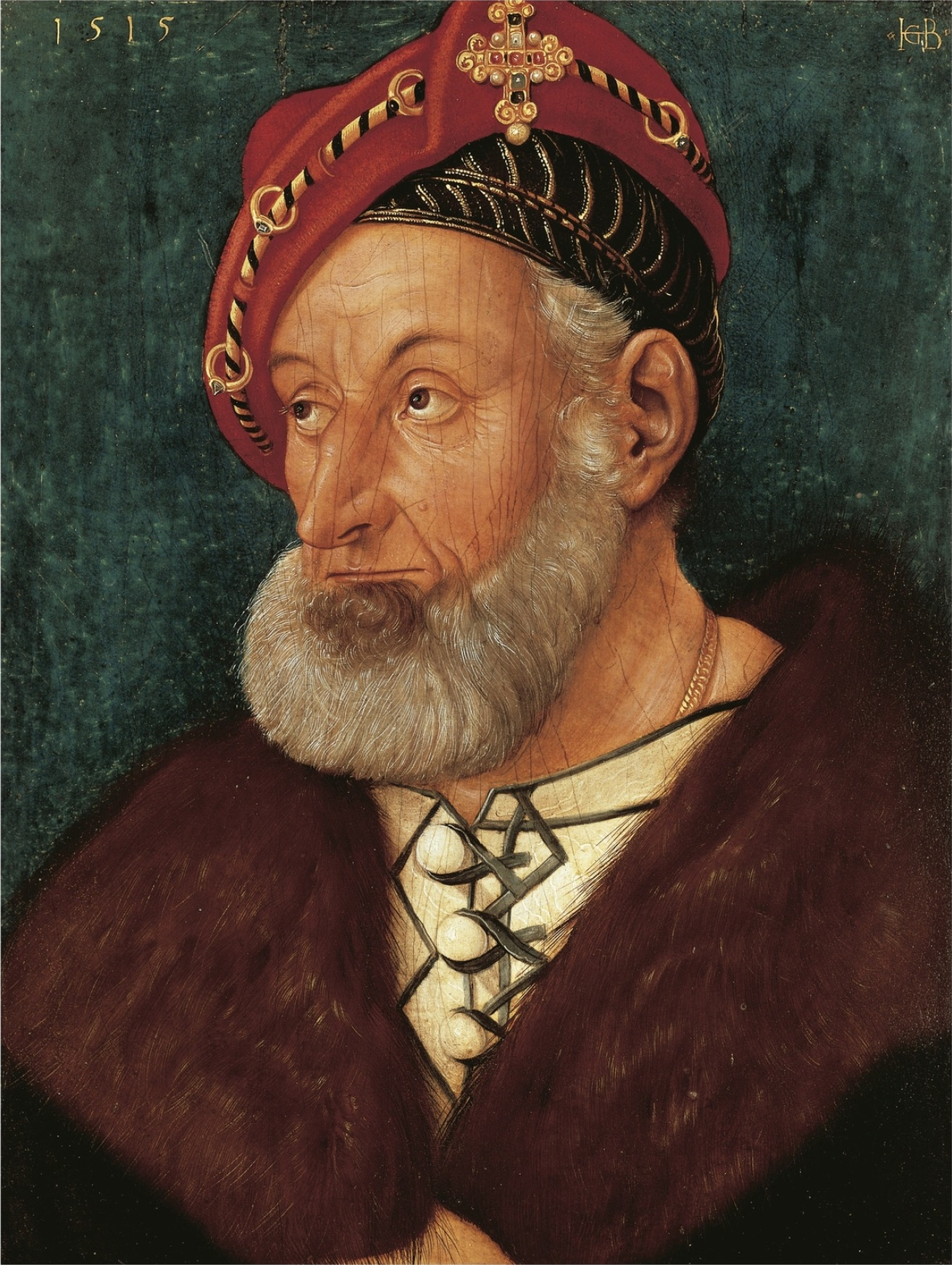
- Christoph of Baden-Baden by Hans Baldung, 1515
- Born: 13 November 1453; Baden-Baden, Margraviate of Baden, Holy Roman Empire
- Died: 19 April 1527 (aged 73); Baden-Baden, Margraviate of Baden, Holy Roman Empire
- Noble family: Zähringen
- Spouse: Ottilie of Katzenelnbogen
- Issue: Ottilie; Jakob; Marie; Bernhard III; Charles; Christopher; Philipp; Rudolf; Ernst; Wolfgang; Sibylle; Rosine; John; Beatrix; George
- Father: Charles I of Baden-Baden
- Mother: Catherine of Austria

Christopher I of Baden (13 November 1453 – 19 April 1527) was the Margrave of Baden from 1475 to 1515.

== Life ==
Christopher was the eldest son of Charles I of Baden-Baden and Catherine of Austria, a sister of Frederick III, Holy Roman Emperor.

Christopher regained the territories that were lost by his father to the Palatinate and its allies. He maneuvered to keep these territories united under his son and successor Philip I, but his efforts were thwarted by Louis XII of France. In 1479, the seat of the Margraviate of Baden was moved from Hohenbaden Castle to New Castle (Neues Schloss) of Baden-Baden which was built by him.

In 1489 Christopher became a member of the Swabian League. This was part of his efforts for peaceful coexistence with his neighbors (in particular with Württemberg and the cities of Weil and Strasbourg). Within the protection of this South West German pact, Christopher advanced the internal development of his dominion.

Christopher's winegrowing law of 1495 was a major step in improving the quality of wine produced in Baden. His wife Ottilie was from a famous wine-making family in the Kraichgau, the Counts of Katzenelnbogen.

By 1503, Christopher was responsible for uniting all the Badener lands when the Baden-Sausenberg died without male heirs. In 1515, before his death, he divided the Margraviate among his sons Philipp, Bernhard, and Ernst. However, Philipp who had succeeded him died childless, and his share was passed down to his brothers Bernhard and Ernst. Thus, Bernhard founded the so-called "Bernardine line" of Baden-Baden and Ernst founded the "Ernestine line" of Baden-Durlach.

== Family and children ==
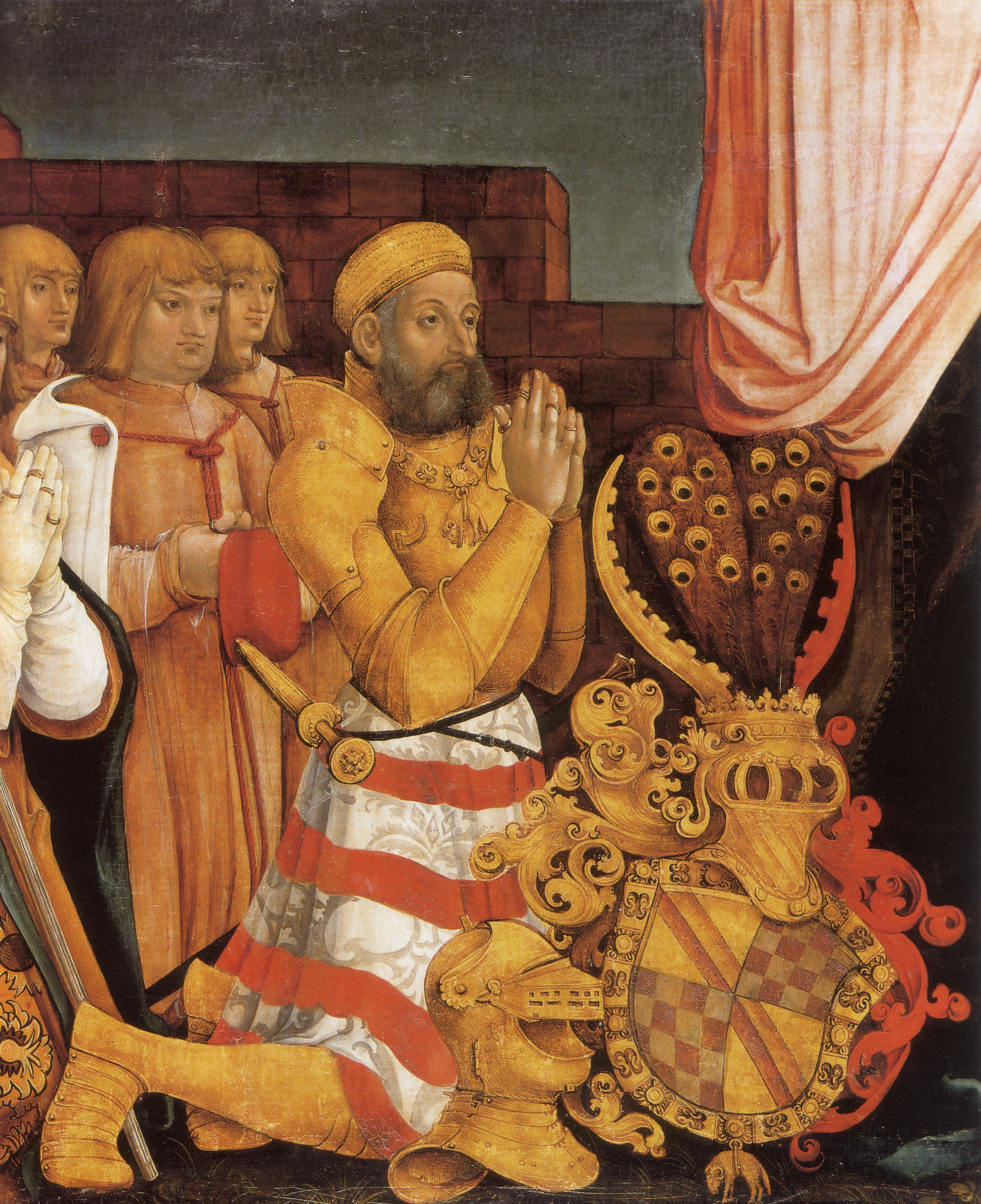
Detail of a painting showing Christopher I

Margrave Christopher married on 30 January 1469 Ottilie of Katzenelnbogen (ca. 1451 – 15 August 1517), a granddaughter of Philipp I of Katzenelnbogen. They had the following children:

1. Ottilie (6 June 1470 – 1490), Abbess in Pforzheim
2. Jakob (6 June 1471 – 27 April 1511, Cologne), Archbishop of Trier
3. Marie (2 July 1473 – 9 January 1519); Abbess in Lichtenthal
4. Bernhard III of Baden-Baden (7 April 1474 – 29 June 1536)
5. Charles (21 June 1476 – 7 October 1510), canon in Strasbourg and Trier
6. Christopher (21 July 1477 – 29 March 1508), canon in Strasbourg and Trier
7. Philipp (10 December 1478 – 17 September 1533); Margrave of Baden-Sponheim
8. Rudolf (16 June 1481 – 23 September 1532), canon in Mainz, Cologne, Strasbourg and Augsburg
9. Ernst, Margrave of Baden-Durlach (7 October 1482 – 6 February 1553), married Ursula of Rosenfeld
10. Wolfgang (10 May 1484 – 24 June 1522)
11. Sibylle (26 April 1485 – 10 July 1518), married on 24 January 1505 to Philipp III of Hanau-Lichtenberg
12. Rosine (5 March 1487 – 29 October 1554), married, firstly in 1503 to Count Franz Wolfgang of Hohenzollern;then secondly on 17 December 1526 to Baron Johann von Ow zu Wachendorf
13. John (d. 19 June 1490)
14. Beatrix (22 January 1492 – 4 April 1535), married in 1508 to John II, Count Palatine of Simmern
15. George (1 July 1493 – 16 November 1493)

== Ancestors ==
Ancestors of Christopher I of Baden

8. Bernard I of Baden-Baden
4. Jacob, Margrave of Baden-Baden
9. Anna of Oettingen
2. Charles I of Baden-Baden
10. Charles II of Lorraine
5. Catherine of Lorraine
11. Margaret of the Palatinate
1. Christopher I, Margrave of Baden
12. Leopold III, Duke of Austria
6. Ernest, Duke of Austria
13. Viridis Visconti
3. Catherine of Austria
14. Siemowit IV of Masovia
7. Cymburgis of Masovia
15. Alexandra of Lithuania

== Sources ==
- Hohkamp, Michaela (2007). "Sisters, Aunts, and Cousins: Familial Architectures and the Political Field in Early Modern Europe". In Sabean, David Warren; Teuscher, Simon; Mathieu, Jon (eds.). Kinship in Europe: Approaches to Long-Term Development (1300-1900). Berghahn books. pp. 91–104.

Christopher I of Baden House of Zähringen Born: 13 November 1453 Died: 19 March 1527
Preceded by Karl I	Margrave of Baden; 1475–1515	Succeeded by Philipp I, Bernhard III and Ernst
Preceded by Philipp	Margrave of Hachberg-Sausenberg; 1503–1515	Succeeded by Philipp I, Bernhard III and Ernst
