= Bernhard, Count of Bylandt =

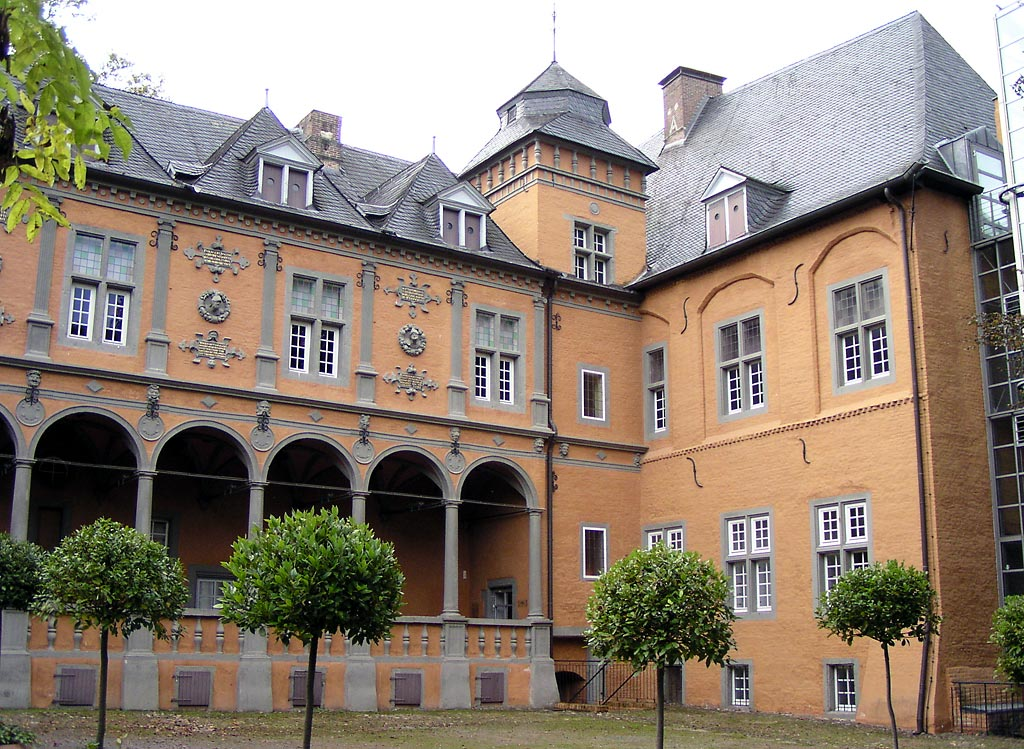
Schloss Rheydt

Bernhard, Count of Bylandt (3 January 1905 – 4 April 1998) was a German nobleman, artist, sculptor, writer and member of the House of Bylandt or more specifically the branch of Bylandt-Rheydt. He studied art under Professor Eduard Kämpffer at the Academy of Art in Breslau. In 1939 he married the German actress Dorothea Gmelin. After divorce he remarried pianist Ilse Josten. In 1958, he became a Professor of Art at the Kunsthochschule Kassel. Bernhard's father, Count Alexander Friedrich von Bylandt-Rheydt (1863–1942) was the last owner of the family seat of Schloss Rheydt. The palace was sold to the town of Rheydt and remains a museum to this day.

== Titles ==
1. Count of Bylandt (Ger: Graf von Bylandt)
2. Baron of Rheydt (Ger: Baron zu Rheydt)
