= Gladbach Abbey =

Abbey in Mönchengladbach, Germany

Coordinates: 51°11′34″N 6°25′52″E

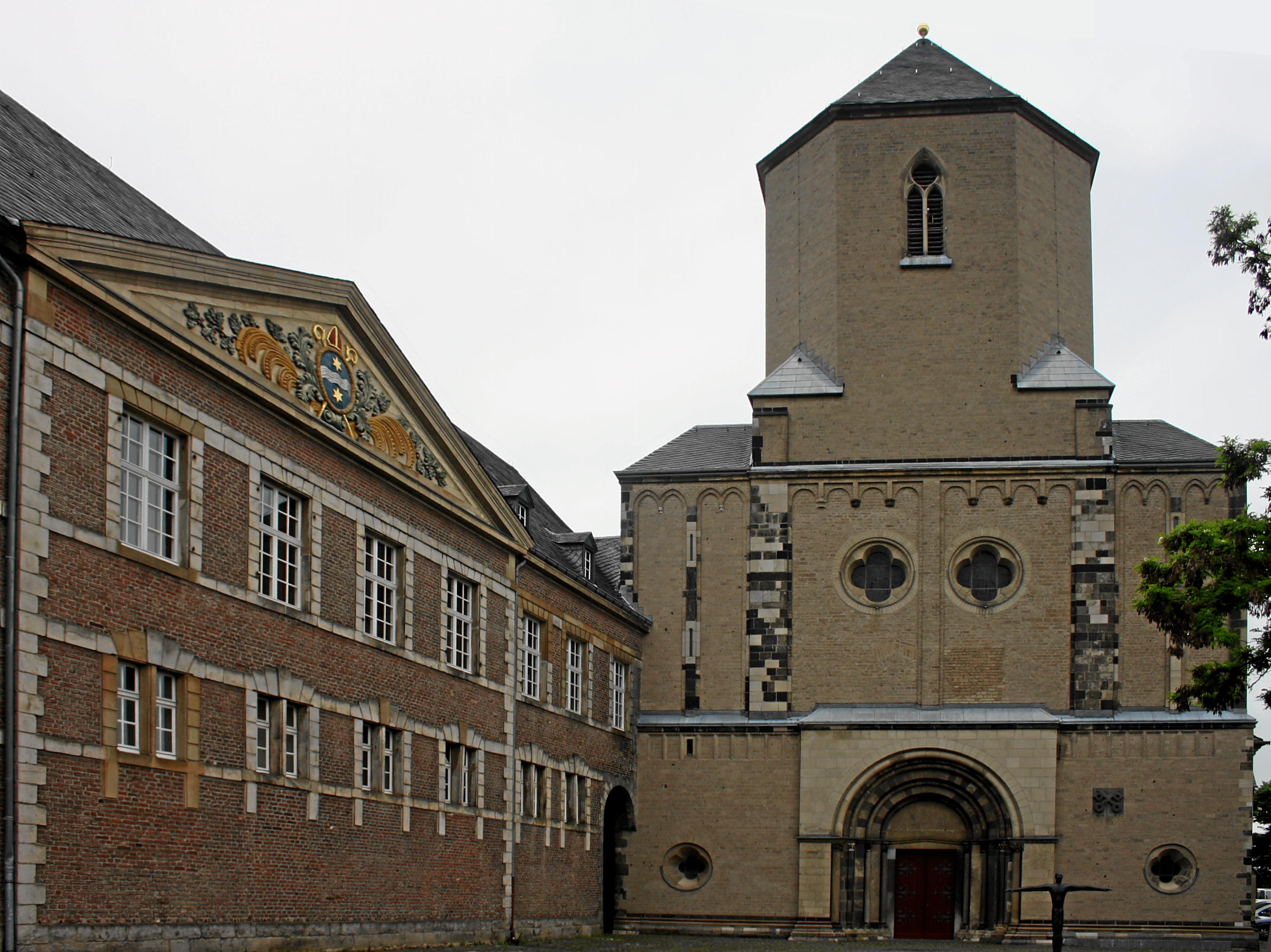
Gladbach Abbey in 2010

Gladbach Abbey was a Benedictine abbey founded in 974 by Archbishop Gero of Cologne and the monk Sandrad from Trier. It was named after the Gladbach, a narrow brook that now runs underground. The abbey and its adjoining villages grew into the town of Gladbach, incorporated in the 1360s, the origin of the present city of Mönchengladbach in North Rhine-Westphalia.

In 1802, the abbey was occupied by troops under the French occupation and secularised; its great library was dispersed. From 1805 to 1835, it was used as a textile mill.

In 1835, the city authorities acquired the main building to replace the old Rathaus, which was demolished. This now constitutes the present Rathaus Abtei. The remaining monastic buildings were also acquired by the city one by one, for the accommodation of municipal offices.
