= Düsseldorf Castle =

German castle

Coordinates: 51°13′39″N 06°46′16″E

The Düsseldorf castle at or in the Düsseldorfer Altstadt existed from 1260 to 1872 or 1896. The building was erected in 1260 as a lowland castle of the Counts of Düsseldorf. Berg at the Rhine mouth of the Düssel on a small island. Extensions as Duke and Court Schloss took place under William, Duke of Jülich-Cleves-Berg (1549), Jan Wellem (late 17th century) and Charles Theodore (1755). The palace gained international attention above all for its Düsseldorf Picture Gallery, which was built from 1709 to 1712 as the first independent gallery building It exhibited a world-famous collection of Renaissance and Baroque paintings until 1805. From 1817 to 1848, part of the palace housed a mint of the Kingdom of Prussia. From 1845 onwards, the former residential palace, which at that time had already housed the Kunstakademie Düsseldorf for several decades, was developed under Friedrich Wilhelm IV into the Parliament of the Rhine Province Provincial Diet. In the night of 19 to 20 March 1872, the palace, for centuries the landmark of the residential city of Düsseldorf as well as a centre in the life and urban fabric of the old town, was a prey to the flames. A remaining south wing was demolished in 1896.

Today, the Burgplatz, whose name refers to the historical use of the area as a castle complex, extends on the site of the castle. Only the Schlossturm, which is home to the Schifffahrtsmuseum, remains of it. Beyond that, the only reminder of the castle there is an outline of differently coloured stones that hints at the former floor plan of the Düsseldorf castle in the pavement of Burgplatz.

== Building history ==
=== Foundation and extension, 13th to 15th century ===
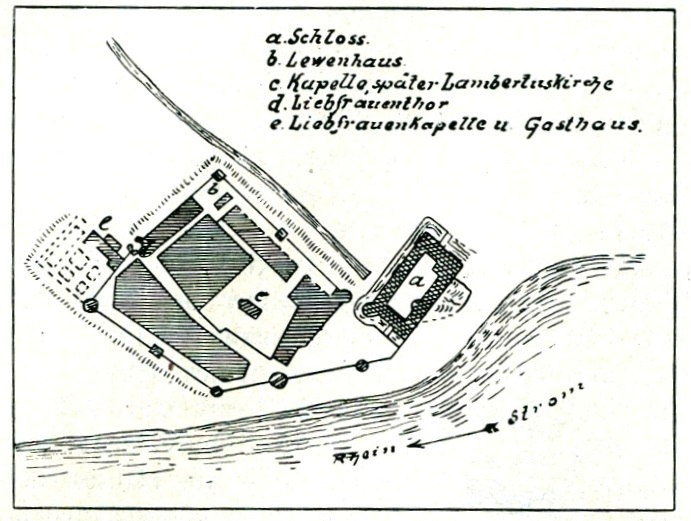
Schloss, 1288

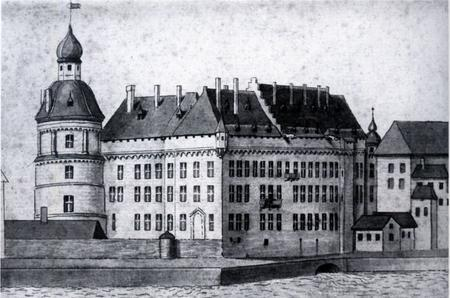
West view of the Düsseldorf Schloss after the remodelling according to the plans of the master builder Nosthofen in 1755.

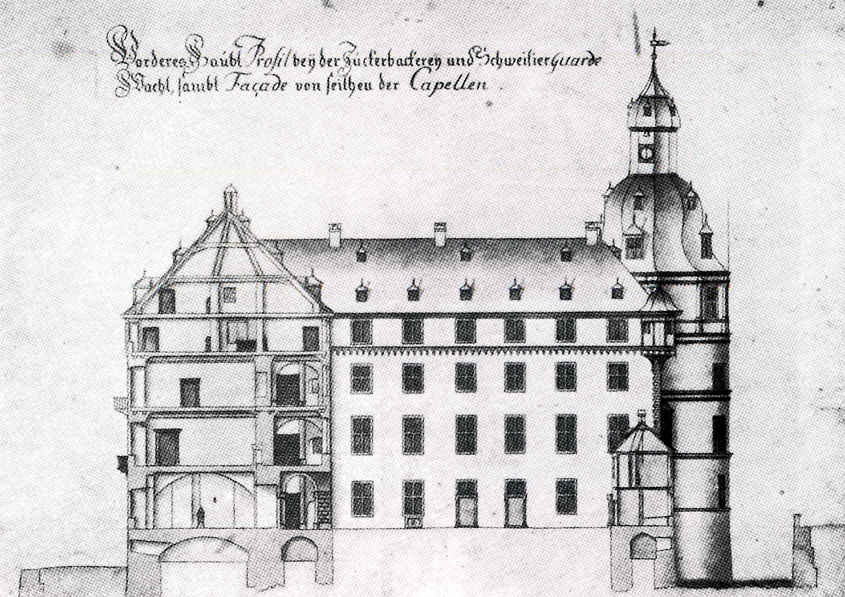
The Düsseldorf Schloss according to a plan from 1756

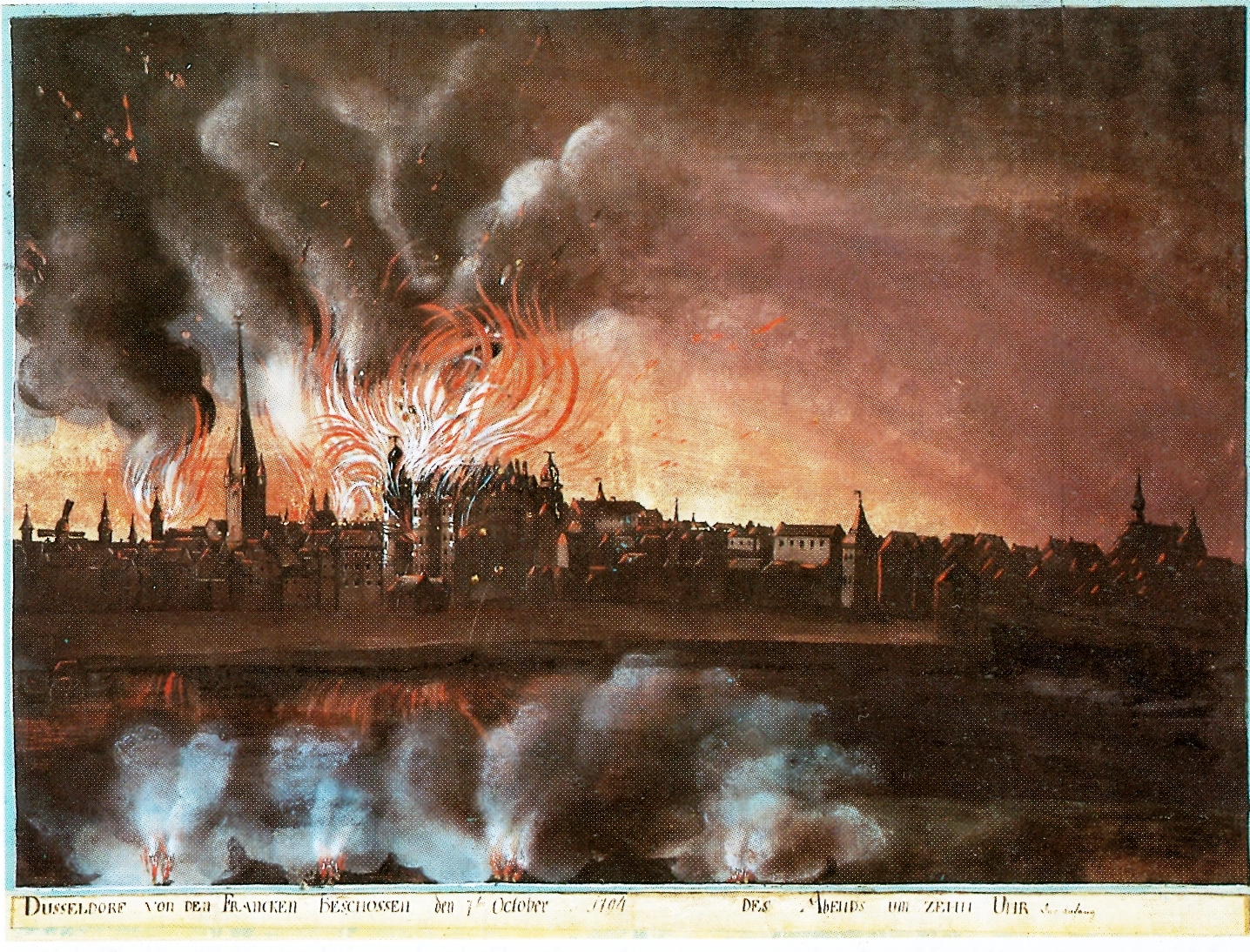
Fire of the city and the Residence Palace after shelling by French artillery on 6 October 1794

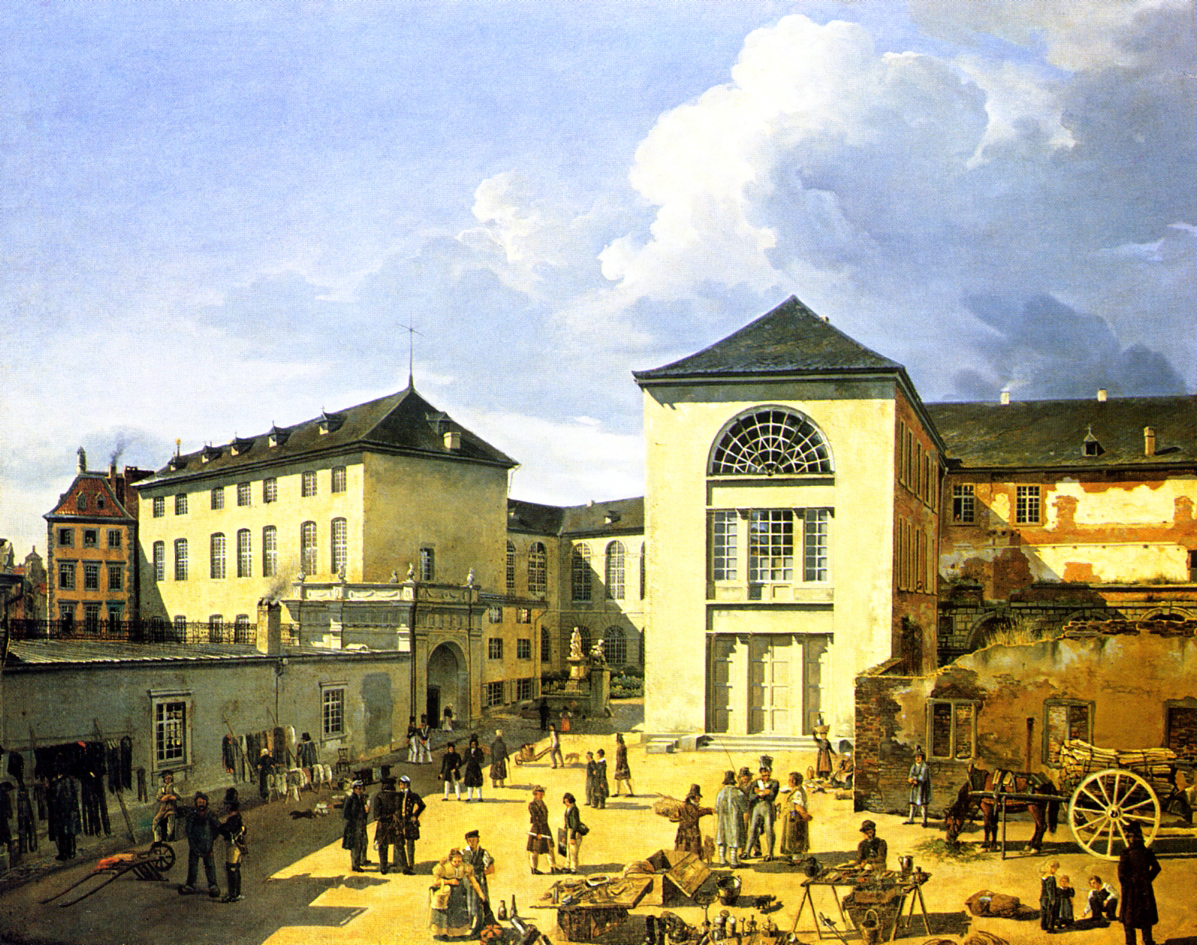
Die alte Akademie in Düsseldorf, Depiction of the Academy of Arts in a wing of the Düsseldorf Schloss in a painting by Andreas Achenbach, 1831

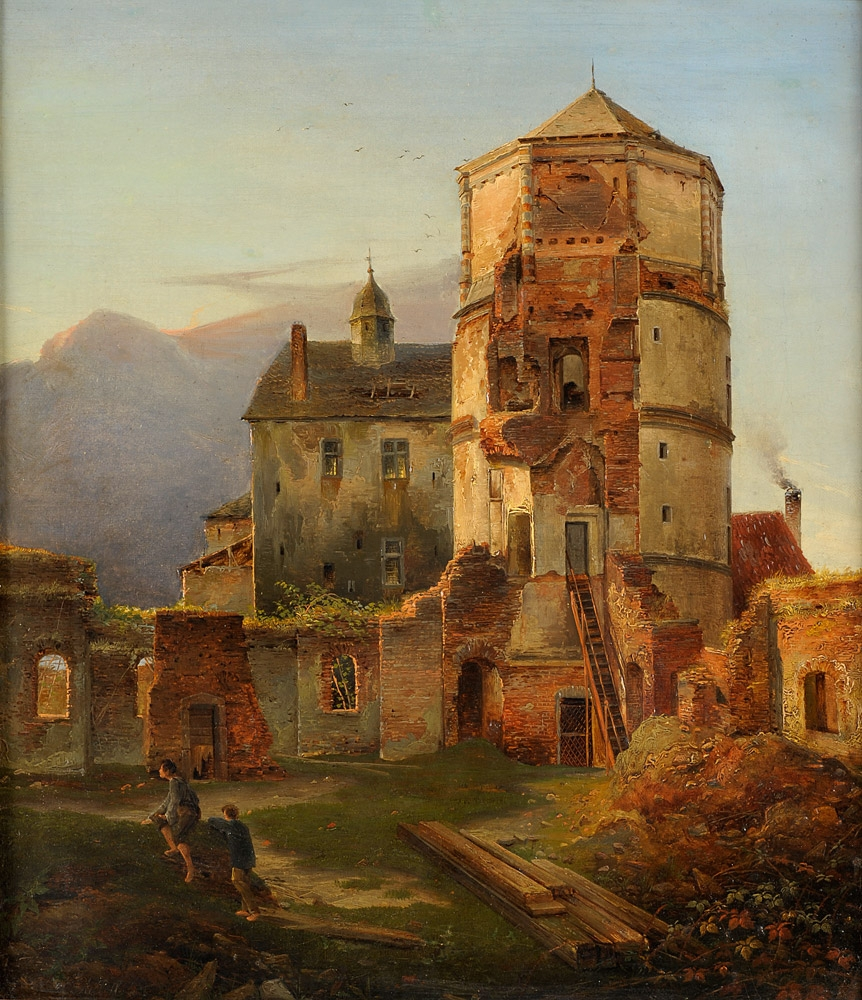
Burgruine, representation of the Schlossturms in a painting by Carl Adloff, around 1840

The castle complex was founded as a comital castle before the year 1260. The origins of the castle date back to the time when Adolf VIII of Berg, together with John I, Duke of Brabant and the counts Walram of Jülich and Eberhard I of the Mark finally ended the rule of the Archbishop of Cologne, Siegfried II of Westerburg, in the Battle of Worringen in 1288. The preserved round tower dates from the 13th century. The elevation of William II to the rank of Imperial Prince entailed a planned spatial arrangement of the Düsseldorf residence. In 1382, the forerunner of the Berg chancellery ("schrijfcamer") existed at the castle. Construction work on a princely chapel is atested in 1382, which was cited as the "castle chapel" in a document dated 12 July 1392 of the Archbishop of Cologne Friedrich III. Further building activities took place around 1384. A three-winged castle complex was built, which occupied approximately the area of today's Burgplatz. The construction took place as part of a town expansion plan. In 1399, two chapels were already present; in the smaller one ("capella minor"), Duke Wilhelm took the promised oath of fealty to the English King Richard II in the presence of the English envoy Johann de Palacio on 23 April 1399. In 1435, a castellan ("Burghgrave") is mentioned. In 1492 the castle burned for the first time, after which increased building activity is noted. At the end of the 15th century, the castle was extended, the square south-eastern tower was built, which dominated the Mühlen- and Kurzestraße, as well as the market and castle square. The material used for the castle was sandstone ashlars mixed with trachyte. Later reinforcements were worked in brick masonry.

=== Fire and destruction in 1510 ===
On 23 December 1510, another fire destroyed the attempt at an expanding reconstruction. "Item in demselven jair op den 23 ten dach December brande die alde Borch to Dusseldorp gans aff", describes the Duisburger Chronik the fire of the Alte Burg in Düsseldorf.

=== Rebuilding and reconstruction according to Pasqualini's plans in 1549 ===
In 1521, Düsseldorf became the capital of the United Duchies of Jülich-Cleves-Berg and was now in urgent need of a representative castle. The reconstruction and rebuilding was led by Bertram von Zündorf. But it was not until Duke William appointed the Renaissance master builder Alessandro Pasqualini from Bologna to Düsseldorf in 1549 that building activity gained momentum.

In 1551, he completed the only remaining castle tower. He placed Tuscan columns in front of it. Pasqualini also added a Renaissance dome to the tower, crowned by a roof lantern with a Welsh bonnet. In the north-eastern corner of the castle courtyard Pasqualini also added a three-storey loggia, which in its "modern Renaissance forms stands out very much from the ancient half-timbered gallery to the left of the rectangular entrepreneure". Documented is an aedicule portal with wall pilasters rhythmised by boss ashlar. The Schlosskapelle with its altar wall and panelling with blind arcade s, Corinthian wall pilasters and verkröpftem Gesims must also be considered Pasqualini's work.

Pasqualini's format and art can be seen in the surviving buildings Rheydt Palace and Jülich Citadel.

On the occasion of his marriage to Jakobea of Baden in 1585, Frans Hogenberg created various copperplate engravings depicting the architecture of the residential palace:

Engravings by Franz Hogenberg of the Düsseldorf Residence around 1585

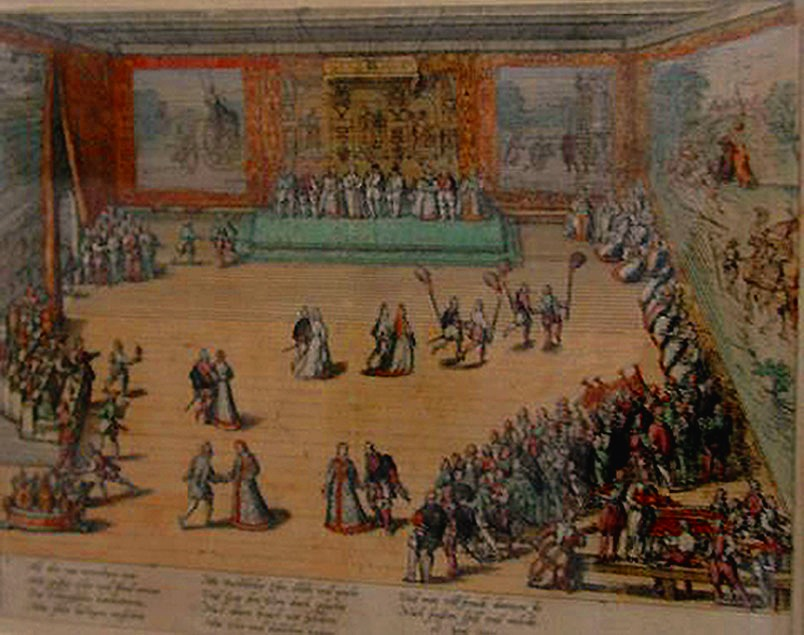
The throne Room

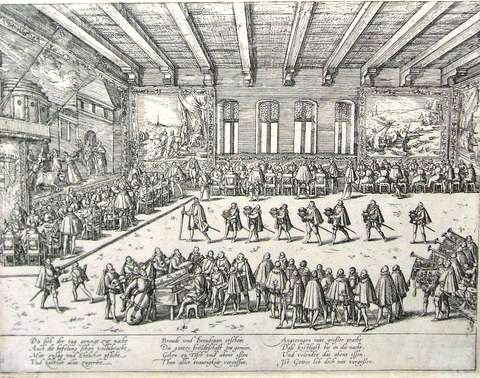
The banquet hall with the Brauttafel

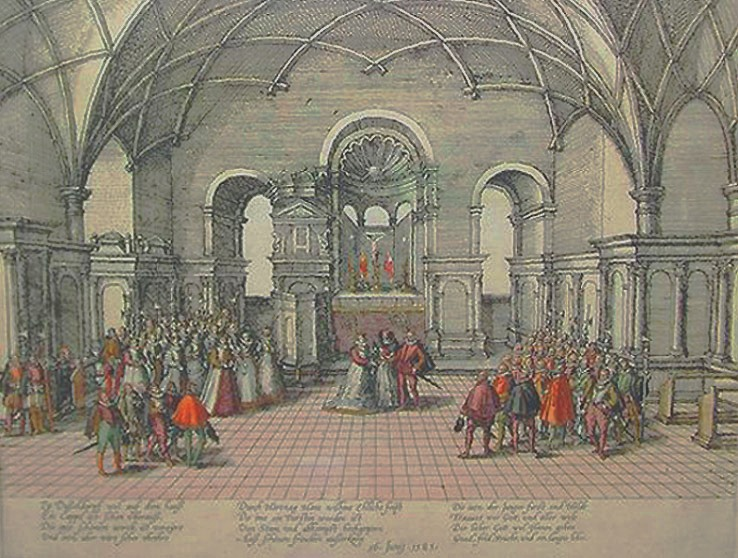
Die Schlosskapelle

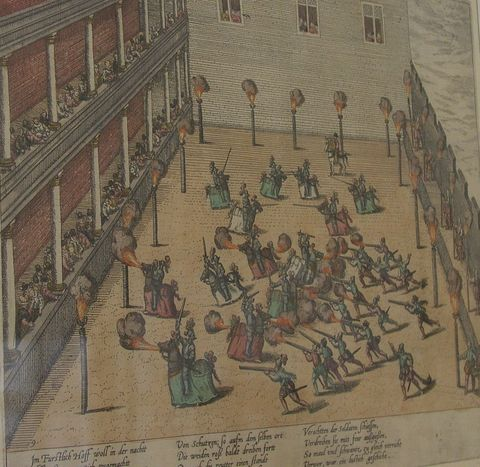
Inner courtyard with columns

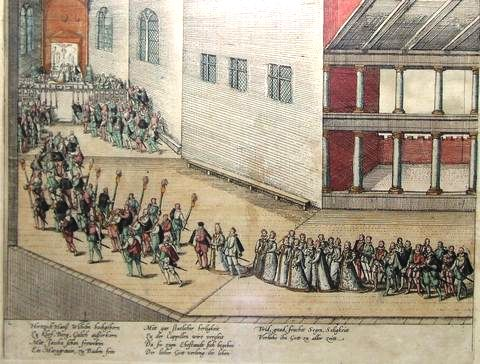
Inner courtyard with columns

In 1613, the Palatinate-Neuburg hereditary prince Wolfgang Wilhelm and the Brandenburg elector Johann Sigismund met in Düsseldorf Schloss to negotiate the War of the Jülich Succession. In the heat of the battle of words, Johann Sigismund slapped the Palatine-Neuburg. The negotiations did not produce an agreement.

=== Reconstruction according to plans by Martinelli, end of 17th century ===
Upon his accession, Elector Jan Wellem, moved the court residence to Düsseldorf. He had the palace "modernised and furnished according to his taste towards the end of the 17th century". The staircase tower on the wing towards the Rhine, as well as the loggia and [half-timbered] galleries, had to give way to arcades and a strictly structured three-line window front".

The renovation work was also directed at the interior; Jan Wellem made use of Italian architects, in particular Domenico Martinelli, who had initially designed a large rectangular four-wing complex with symmetrical Baroque façades and sequences of rooms, incorporating foundation walls from the old palace. Due to a lack of funds, however, this design was not realised; instead, the old palace was lavishly modernised. However, the baroque court also demanded more space. Thus a bakehouse, a brewery, a stable and a riding school were built, as well as a theatre, a ballroom and a page house. The large banqueting hall with windows overlooking the Rhine was built in the wing facing the Rhine. The banquets and balls on the occasion of the wedding of John William, the son of Wilhelm, to Jakobea of Baden had taken place in this hall. The hall had a "very powerful beamed ceiling and huge tapestries". An illustration has been preserved in Dietrich Graminäus' book of memories. In 1654, Duke Philip William received the English King Karl II at the castle. In 1697, another important wedding celebration took place in the castle: The homosexual Gian Gastone de' Medici, alongside his equally homosexual brother Ferdinando the last male representative of the Grand Ducal House of Medici, married Anna Maria Franziska of Saxe-Lauenburg, from whom he soon separated childless, condemning this dynasty to extinction. During the War of the Spanish Succession, in October 1703, Arch Duke Charles, later Roman-German Emperor Charles VI, who had been proclaimed King of Spain, paid a visit to the electoral couple in the castle. Also John Churchill, who was involved in the war at that time, stayed in Düsseldorf during these days. Because of the Conquest of Electoral Cologne Kaiserswerth in 1702, the English Queen Anne had elevated him to the first Duke of Marlborough. Between 1709 and 1712, according to plans by Matteo Alberti, the first independent gallery building Gemäldegalerie Düsseldorf was added to the palace.

Elector Jan Wellem and his wife Anna Maria Luisa resided in Düsseldorf, often moving to Benrath Palace in the summer and to Bensberg Castle for hunting.

After the death of Jan Wellem, the main residence of the Elector was transferred to Heidelberg in 1718 and to Mannheim in 1720 under his successor Karl Philipp, so that the palace and city of Düsseldorf lost their prominent position again.

=== Demolition of the north wing and reconstruction according to Nosthofen's plans in 1755 ===
In 1755 Carl Theodor decided - due to the dilapidation of the old palace caused by fire and damp - to build a new palace. He therefore had the old north wing demolished. In the other wings, he had the parapets of the roofs removed and an additional storey built above the Gothic arches of the third storey as living quarters for the servants. The building complex was crowned with steep, heavy French roofs, the designs supplied by the court architect Johann Caspar Nosthofen. In 1780, Nicolas de Pigage built the new mews.

=== Bombardment and destruction in 1794 and restoration order in 1811 ===
The Armies of revolutionary France reached the Rhine near Neuss and Düsseldorf in 1794. in 1794. On the evening of 6 October, the French under Jean-Baptiste Kléber and Jean-Baptiste Bernadotte, the later King of Sweden, answered a cannonade of the imperial troops in the city with a shelling of Düsseldorf. As a result, a large fire broke out on the night of 7 October, in which the Residenzschloss, the church and convent of the Celestines in Ratinger Straße, the electoral stables on Mühlenstraße, and many burghers' houses burned out and down. The shelling was painted by an unknown person in a gouache: The French battery on the left bank of the Rhine is depicted in the foreground. The city is illuminated by flames bursting out of the castle and the houses on Ratinger and Mühlenstraße.

In the Beautification Decree of 17 December 1811, published in the Law Bulletin of the Grand Duchy of Berg, Napoleon Bonaparte, who had visited Düsseldorf the previous month, provided under Art. 5 that the old palace should be restored and a university housed in it.

=== Reconstruction according to plans by Wiegmann and Stüler in 1845 ===
The remaining parts of the palace were to be used for the Provincial Landtag of the Rhenish Stände and for the Kunstakademie according to plans by the Academy of Arts professor Rudolf Wiegmann and the Royal Prussian court architect Friedrich August Stüler be rebuilt again or structurally supplemented in the style of the neo-Renaissance. In 1845, the foundation stone was laid in the presence of King Frederick William IV. The tower, which still stands as part of the castle ruins, was also rebuilt in the neo-Renaissance style, following Pasqualini's ideas. Thus, the tower was given another lantern with platform above the top floor, according to King Frederick William IV's own design, implemented by Stüler. The north wing was roofed. The Provinzial-Gewerbe-Ausstellung für Rheinland und Westphalen was held in the completed 24 halls of the palace from 15 July to 1 October 1852, even before the Provincial Diet moved in.

=== Fire in 1872 and demolition of the south wing in 1896 ===
In the night of 19 to 20 March 1872, a major fire broke out for unknown reasons on the upper floor of the Rhine-side wing of the palace, affecting the entire palace. The part used for the Ständehaus also burnt out. The Gemäldegalerie Düsseldorf, however, was preserved along with its valuable holdings thanks to the efforts of its curator, the painter Andreas Müller. After the fire, only the castle tower was restored. Initially, Wilhelm Lotz, the head of the architecture class at the Academy of Arts, and Hermann Riffart planned for a reconstruction of the palace for purposes of the art academy. This was opposed by other professors who doubted the suitability of the palace as an academy building and demanded better premises, which they finally obtained with the Neubau der Kunstakademie am Sicherheitshafen in 1879. The Provincial Diet of the Rhine Province also had a new building constructed, the Ständehaus on the Kaiserteich, built between 1876 and 1880. The remaining southern wing of the palace was demolished in 1896. All that remained was the Schlossturm in the form created by Pasqualini, Wiegmann and Stüler, which was called the Round Tower at the beginning of the 20th century.

== Reception ==
- Thomas Coryat, an English travel writer who is considered one of the fathers of the Grand Tour, wrote in his Crudities, published in 1611: "The first town I came to was Düsseldorf, a pretty town in the Duchy of Cleves, situated on the Rhine. It is remarkable for two things: one is a magnificent palace belonging to the duke, and then there is a residence of the ducal court... But little as I saw, I remarked that it is the most magnificent residence I saw in all the Netherlands. This palace possesses a singular peculiarity: a part of the Rhine is beautifully overbuilt by it by suitable vaults laid out for the purpose."
- Heinrich Heine recalled his Düsseldorf childhood with the following lines: '...we sat in front of the marble statue on the Schlossplatz - on one side lies the old, desolate castle, in which it is haunted and at night a black-silk lady without a head, with a long, rustling train wanders around.andelt…“. The black silk lady conceals the memory of the unfortunate Jakobea of Baden.
