= A. Edward Nussbaum =

German-born American mathematician

Adolf Edward Nussbaum
- Born: January 10, 1925
- Died: October 31, 2009 (aged 84)
- Education: Brooklyn College; Columbia University
- Scientific career
- Workplaces: Washington University in St. Louis; Rensselaer Polytechnic Institute

Adolf Edward Nussbaum (10 January 1925 – 31 October 2009) was a German-born American theoretical mathematician who was a professor of mathematics in Arts and Sciences at Washington University in St. Louis for nearly 40 years. He worked with others in 20th-century theoretical physics and mathematics such as J. Robert Oppenheimer and John von Neumann, and was acquainted with Albert Einstein.

== Early years ==
Nussbaum was born to a Jewish family in Rheydt, a borough of the German city Mönchengladbach in northwestern Germany, in 1925. The youngest of three children, he was a Holocaust survivor and was orphaned after the Nazi takeover of Germany.

Both his father, Karl Nussbaum, a wounded veteran of World War I during which he had been awarded the Iron Cross, and his mother, Franziska, was murdered at Auschwitz. His brother, Erwin Nussbaum, was also captured and killed. Nussbaum and his sister, Lieselotte, were separated and sent on a Kindertransport to Belgium in 1939.

When Belgium was invaded by Germany, Nussbaum escaped to southern France, then under the Vichy regime. He lived there at an orphanage known as Château de la Hille. He began his teaching career there, while still a teenager, teaching mathematics to the younger children.

After being captured twice, and jailed once by the Nazis, he escaped on foot to Switzerland, where he attended the University of Zurich, studying both mathematics and physics. In 1947, he was sponsored by relatives in New Jersey to emigrate to the United States.

== Career ==
Shortly after emigrating to the United States, he studied mathematics at Brooklyn College before transferring to Columbia University in New York where he earned his Master of Arts degree in 1950 and his Ph.D. in 1957.

While writing his thesis for Columbia, he worked in the academic year 1952–1953 at the Institute for Advanced Study in Princeton with John von Neumann, a mathematician who used Hilbert spaces in his development of the mathematical basis of quantum mechanics. Hilbert spaces eventually became Nussbaum's area of expertise and he wrote several papers with von Neumann on this topic. During this period, Nussbaum also became acquainted with Albert Einstein, another of the original group at the Institute for Advanced Study.

Nussbaum's thesis was accepted with no revisions and he received his doctorate shortly thereafter.

In the meantime he had worked at the University of Connecticut in Storrs, where he co-authored papers with Allen Devinatz, and at the Rensselaer Polytechnic Institute in Troy, New York. He followed Devinatz to St. Louis to teach at Washington University in 1958.

In 1962, he was a visiting scholar at the Institute for Advanced Studies working with Robert Oppenheimer; in 1967–68 he was a visiting scholar at Stanford University in Palo Alto, California.

He joined Washington University's mathematics faculty as an assistant professor in 1958. He became a full professor in 1966 and taught until 1995, when he was named an emeritus professor.

== Personal life ==
Nussbaum married his cousin's sister-in-law, Anne Ebbin, on September 1, 1957. They had a son, Karl Erich Nussbaum and a daughter, Franziska Suzanne Nussbaum. He died in St. Louis, Missouri, in 2009.

== Selected publications ==
- Devinatz, A.; ——; Neumann, J. Von (1955). "On the Permutability of Self-Adjoint Operators". The Annals of Mathematics. 62 (2): 199–203. doi:10.2307/1969674. ISSN 0003-486X. JSTOR 1969674.
- —— (1955). "The Hausdorff-Bernstein-Widder theorem for semi-groups in locally compact Abelian groups". Duke Mathematical Journal. 22 (4): 573–582. doi:10.1215/S0012-7094-55-02263-8. ISSN 0012-7094.
- Devinatz, A.; —— (1957). "On the Permutability of Normal Operators". Annals of Mathematics. 65 (1): 144–152. doi:10.2307/1969669. JSTOR 1969669.
- —— (1959). "Integral Representation of Semi-Groups of Unbounded Self-Adjoint Operators". Annals of Mathematics. 69 (1): 133–141. doi:10.2307/1970098. JSTOR 1970098.
- Devinatz, Allen; —— (1960). On Real Characters of Certain Semi-groups with Applications. Office of Scientific Research, US Air Force; 54 pages
- —— (1962). "On a theorem by I. Glicksberg". Proceedings of the American Mathematical Society. 13 (4): 645–646. doi:10.1090/S0002-9939-1962-0138721-7.
- —— (1964). "On the reduction of $C$^{*}-algebras". Proceedings of the American Mathematical Society. 15 (4): 567–573. doi:10.1090/S0002-9939-1964-0165383-7.
- —— (1964). "Reduction theory for unbounded closed operators in Hilbert space". Duke Mathematical Journal. 31: 33–44. doi:10.1215/S0012-7094-64-03103-5.
- —— (1965). "Quasi-analytic vectors" (PDF). Arkiv för Matematik. 6 (10): 179–191. Bibcode:1965ArM.....6..179N. doi:10.1007/BF02591357. S2CID 122725979.
- —— (1967). "On the integral representation of positive linear functionals". Transactions of the American Mathematical Society. 128 (3): 460–473. doi:10.1090/S0002-9947-1967-0215108-9.
- —— (1969). "A commutativity theorem for unbounded operators in Hilbert space". Transactions of the American Mathematical Society. 140: 485–491. doi:10.1090/S0002-9947-1969-0242010-0. ISSN 0002-9947.
- —— (1970). "Spectral representation of certain one-parametric families of symmetric operators in Hilbert space". Transactions of the American Mathematical Society. 152 (2): 419–429. doi:10.1090/S0002-9947-1970-0268719-9.
- —— (1972). "Radial exponentially convex functions". Journal d'Analyse Mathématique. 25 (1): 277–288. doi:10.1007/BF02790041. ISSN 0021-7670. S2CID 122743981.
- —— (1973). "Integral representation of functions and distributions positive definite relative to the orthogonal group". Transactions of the American Mathematical Society. 175: 355–387. doi:10.1090/S0002-9947-1973-0333600-6.
- —— (1973). "On functions positive definite relative to the orthogonal group and the representation of functions as Hankel-Stieltjes transforms". Transactions of the American Mathematical Society. 175: 389–408. doi:10.1090/S0002-9947-1973-0333601-8.
- —— (1976). "Semi-Groups of Subnormal Operators". Journal of the London Mathematical Society. s2-14 (2): 340–344. doi:10.1112/jlms/s2-14.2.340.
- —— (1982). "Multi-parameter local semi-groups of Hermetian operators". Journal of Functional Analysis. 48 (2): 213–223. doi:10.1016/0022-1236(82)90067-2.
- —— (1997). "A commutativity theorem for semibounded operators in Hilbert space". Proceedings of the American Mathematical Society. 125 (12): 3541–3545. doi:10.1090/S0002-9939-97-03977-4. JSTOR 2162252.
