= Bylandt =

van Bylandt
- noble family
- Country: Netherlands; Germany
- Founded: 13th century
- Founder: Wilhelmus dictus Doys
- Titles: count, baron
- Cadet branches: Bylandt-Well; Bylandt-Rheydt; Bylandt-Halt-Spaldorf

the House of Bylandt is the name of an ancient house of nobility originating in the Lower Rhine region. It later split into the cadet branches of Bylandt-Well, Bylandt-Rheydt and Bylandt-Halt-Spaldorf.

== History ==
The first traceable ancestors of the house of Bylandt were known by the name of Doys, and were already noble ("Uradel"). The first documented member of this name is Wilhelmus dictus Doys (1260) who died in the Battle of Worringen. Doys is mentioned in 1275 as being the owner of Castle Scate, then a fiefdom of the Counts (and later Dukes) of Cleves. Doys son Dietrich became the first person to use "de Bylandt" as his house name (1294). From then on all descendants used the name Bylandt. Following that period, the Bylandt family became steadily more powerful and acquired vast amounts of land. The title Marshal of the County of Cleves also stayed in the family for a long time. In 1500, the three cadet branches formed. The first branch, Bylandt-Well, became the owners of Gut in Geldern but soon died out. The second, Bylandt-Rheydt, inherited Rheydt, later calling themselves Baron of Rheydt, and gained control of much land, including land in Austria, the Netherlands and Germany. They were later granted the title of Freiherr and in 1865 the title of Count. The third cadet branch, Bylandt-Halt-Spaldorf, gained control of the Castles of Halt and Spaldorf in Westphalia and also became Freiherren in 1661, while in 1678 they were created Imperial Counts.

== Famous scions ==
- Bernhard, Count of Bylandt (1905–1998) professor of art, author.
- Arthur Maximilian, Count of Bylandt (1821–1891), politician, Austrian Minister of Defence.
- Willem Frederik van Bylandt, lieutenant-general during the Napoleonic era.
- Lodewijk van Bylandt (1718–1793), admiral.

== Coat of arms ==
Shield: in gold a black cross. This coat of arms is depicted in the medieval Gelre Armorial (folio 90r).

== Gallery ==
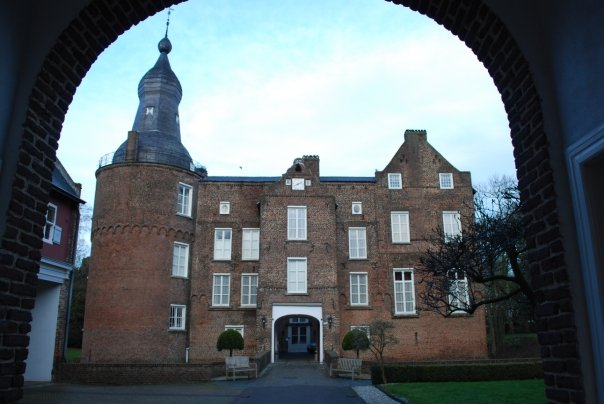
Castle Well, property of the family during the 15th century

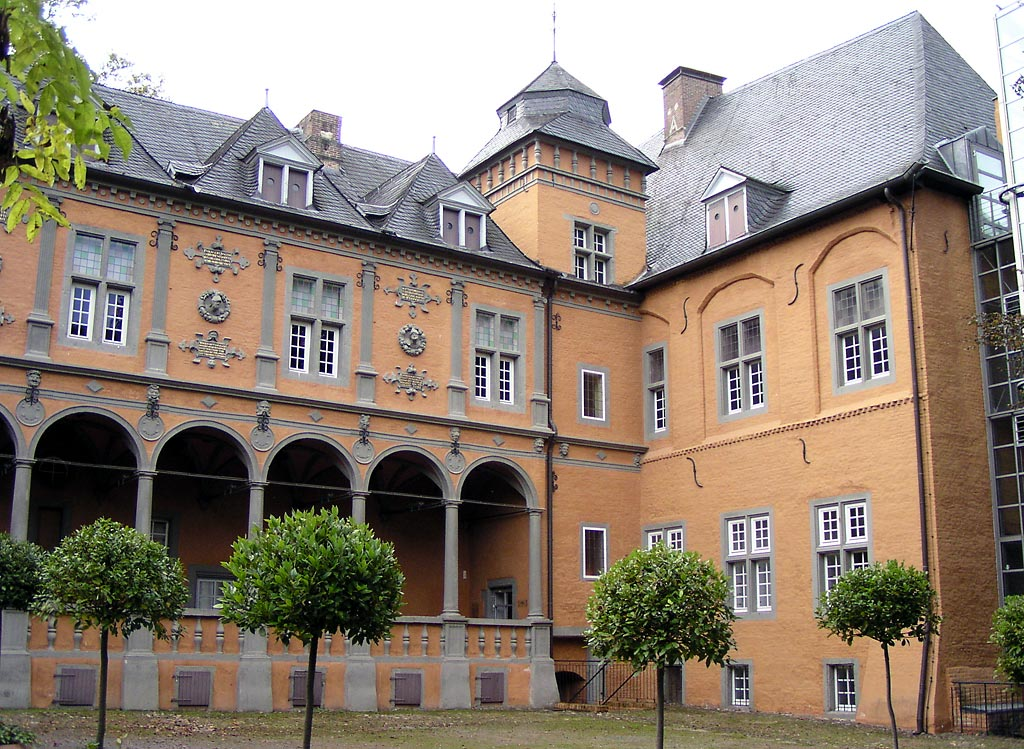
Rheydt Castle, the family seat of the Bylandt-Rheydt branch

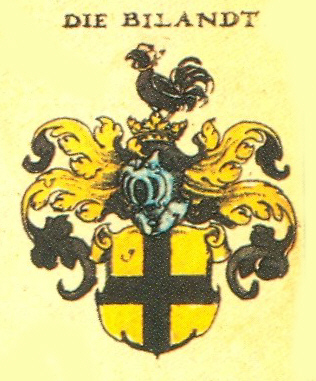
Bylandt coat of arms in Siebmachers Wappenbuch

== Literature ==
- Balk, L.Inventaris van de familie-archieven van Bylant-Halt en van Bylandt-Rheydt (1329–1970) ('s-Gravenhage, 1983). (in Dutch).
- Otto Hupp. Münchener Kalender 1931. (München/Regensburg, 1931). (in German).
- Vorsterman van Oijen, A.A.Genealogie van het geslacht van Bijlandt.('s-Gravenhage, 1891) (in Dutch).
- Nederland's Adelsboek 80 (1989), pp. 599–632 (in Dutch).
- Detlev Schwennicke, Europäische Stammtafeln Band XVIII (1998) Tafel 48–53.
