= Hermann Riffart =

German architect (1840–1919)

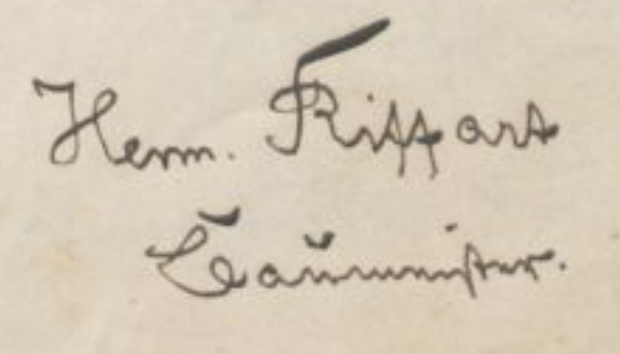
Signature 1874

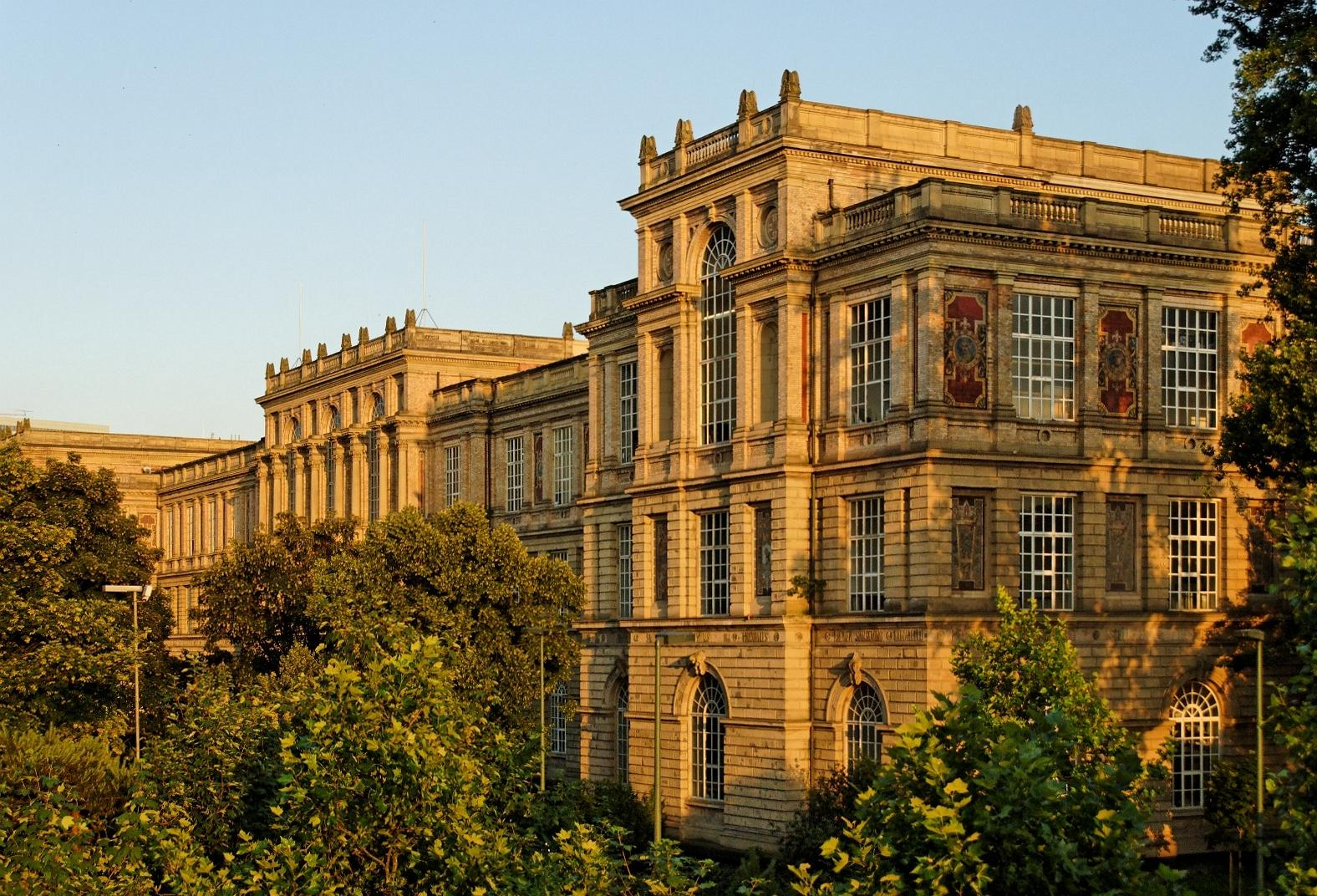
Main building of the Kunstakademie Düsseldorf

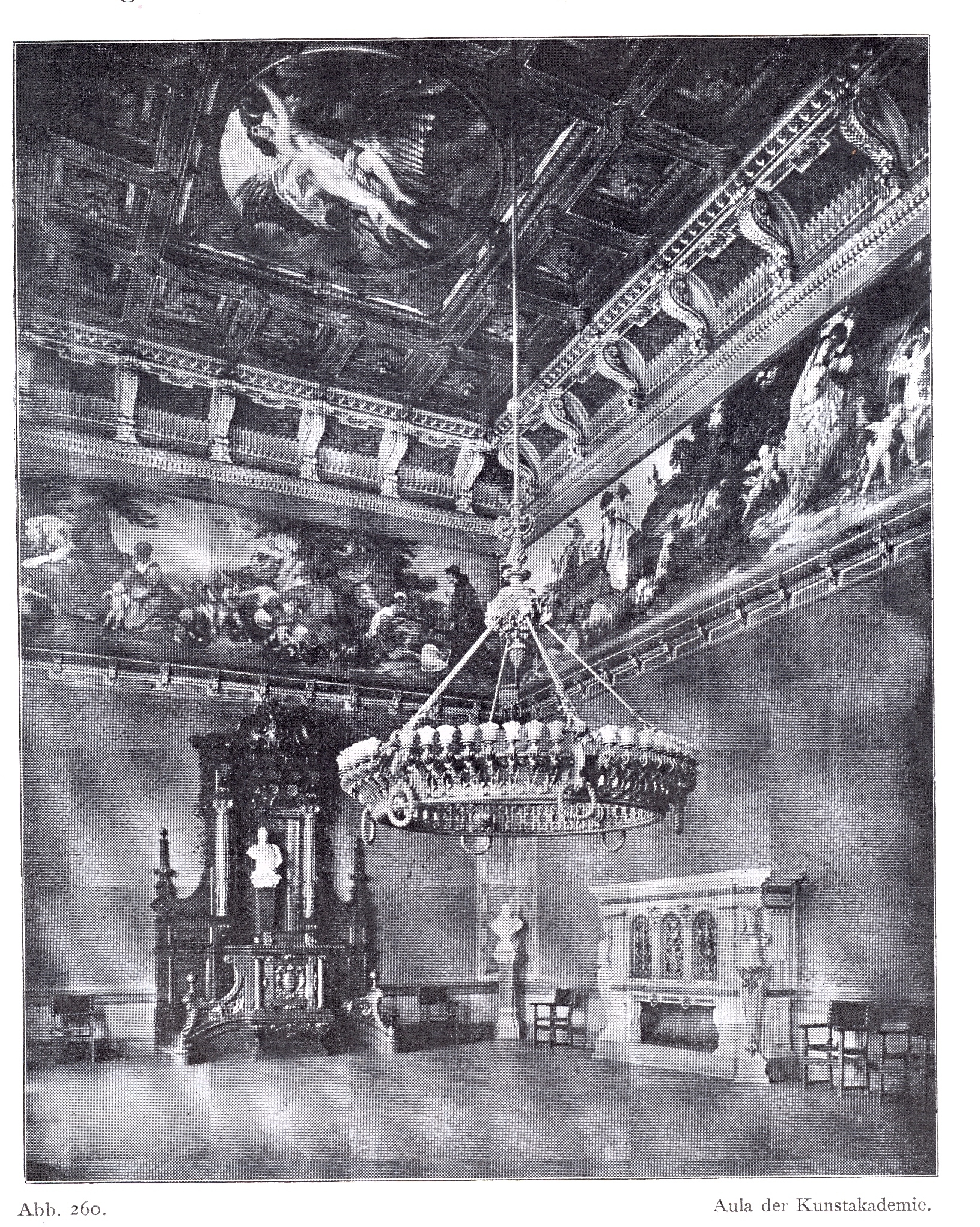
Aula of the Kunstakademie (1875–1879)

Hermann Riffart (3 November 1840 – 3 September 1919), Johann Hermann Hubert Riffart was a German architect of the historism.

== Life and work ==
Riffart was born in Cologne in November 1840 as the son of the carriage manufacturer Johann Hermann Riffart and his wife Catharina Riffart, née Zimmermann. He was trained as an architect by Heinrich Strack in Berlin. with admission to the Architekten- und Ingenieurverein zu Berlin-Brandenburg in 1864. From the beginning of the 1870s, Riffart worked as a building councillor in Düsseldorf. In addition to the building of the state Kunstakademie Düsseldorf (1875–1879), he planned a reconstruction of the Düsseldorf Castle, which had been destroyed by fire, but which was not realised. In 1875, he took part in the competition for the Alte Kunsthalle at Grabbeplatz in Düsseldorf, which he won, but the building was not realised.

On 3 July 1873, his son Carl Maria Hermann was born in Düsseldorf. The latter attended the Königliches Gymnasium, received instruction there in the building trade. In July 1877 the son Ferdinand Maria Hermann was born in Düsseldorf. One of his sons later became a notary in Kevelaer. His daughter Mathilde was born.

His best-known pupil was Bruno Schmitz, who, after attending the construction class at Wilhelm Lotz's art academy in 1874, worked in the master builder's studio for four years.

From 1875, Riffart lived at 38 Capellstraße (heute Kapellstraße). The master builder Hermann Joseph Havenith (5 March 1841 in London – 10 August 1905 in Birstein), who had a building business in Düsseldorf, had built the new house in 1873 (listed since 1983). The Düsseldorf address book lists Riffart as the owner of the house until after 1914, whereby the place of residence is given as Kevelaer, presumably that of his son.

In 1882, the architect Rudolf Custodis mentioned in an appeal to the voters not to vote for the candidate Riffarth because of unnecessary expenditures of the city as follows: "The gentleman is a quite capable government builder; has travelled around Egypt and has received quite beautiful impressions of the conditions there, as the chequered art academy building demonstrates ad oculos to everyone. (That means in German "Who has not yet seen more beautiful caserns?.") Just like the square metre of the Academy of Arts, we can also expect the running kilometre of the canal from this side. (...)."

In 1883, Riffart's architectural watercolours were exhibited in the Galerie Eduard Schulte at Alleestraße 42. In 1889, Riffart is documented as a private master builder in Düsseldorf. At the end of 1891, he, who had been a city councillor since the early 1880s, was appointed to the board of the Kunstgewerbeschule together with the mirror and painting frame manufacturer Conzen and the painter Ernst Bosch. At the time of the founding of the Architekten- und Ingenieurverein Düsseldorf, Riffart was deputy chairman in 1893, the director of the school of arts and crafts Hermann Stiller had the chairmanship.

Son Ferdinand, announced on 4 September 1919 that the government architect out of service Hermann Riffart had died on 3 September 1919 at the age of 78, last residence Marktstraße No. 25 in Kevelaer, husband of Mathilde Ingenlath.

One of Riffart's cousins was the Berlin building official Wilhelm Neumann.

== Work ==
- 1875–1879: Hauptgebäude der Kunstakademie Düsseldorf (also called "Hofgartenschloss"; one of the most important buildings of the Neo-Renaissance in Germany)

== Honour ==
- Roter Adlerorden IV. Class in October 1879 on the occasion of the inauguration of the Kunstakademie Düsseldorf
