= Wasserturm Mönchengladbach =

Coordinates: 51°12′3.7″N 6°25′35.50″E

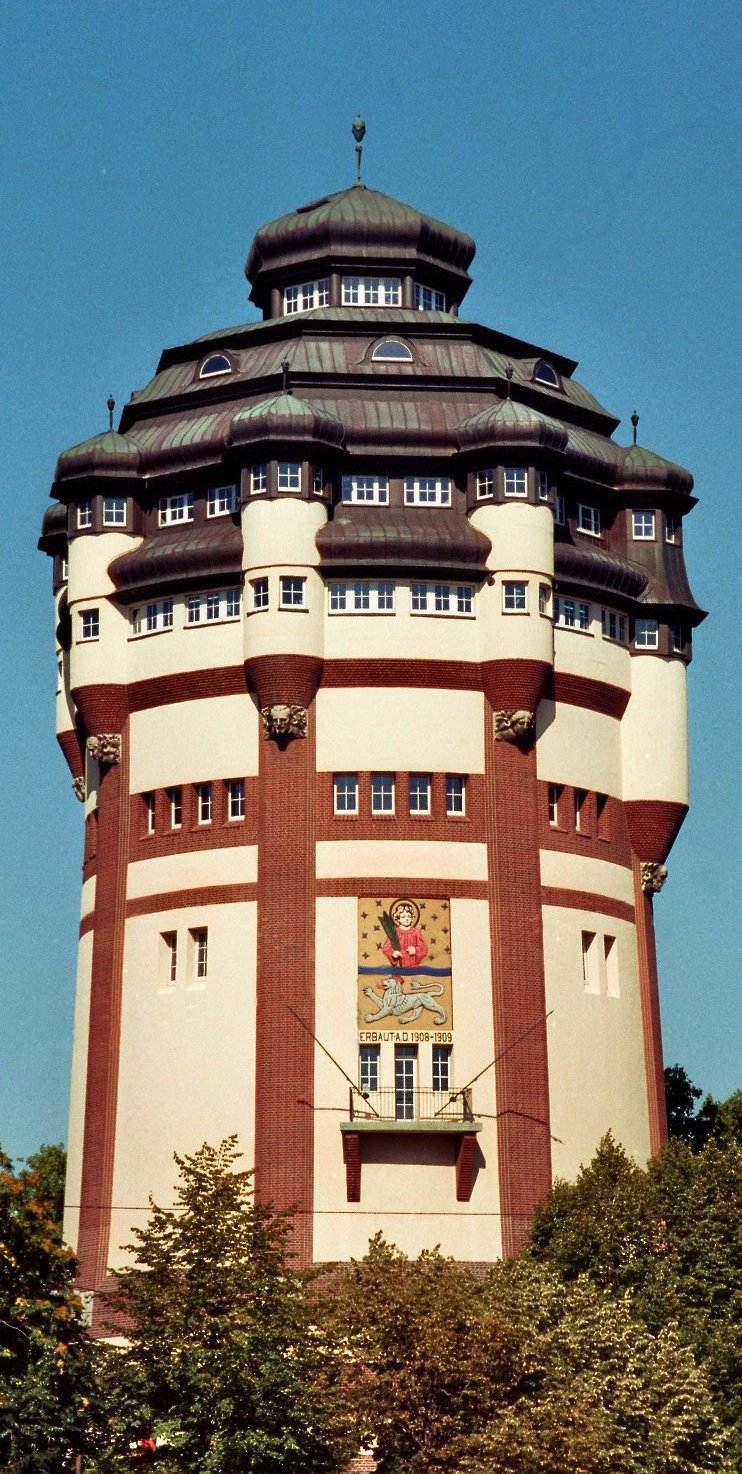
Wasserturm an der Viersener Straße

The Wasserturm Mönchengladbach, also called Neuer Wasserturm, is one of the landmarks of Mönchengladbach.

== Description ==
The construction of the water tower was completed in 1909 within two years and the inauguration on took place on November 14, 1909. The cost for the construction was at that time 216,000 marks . The tower has a height of 51 meters and is located north of the city center on one of the main roads to Viersen . It was built in an Art Nouveau style according to the plans of the architect Otto Greiß, who wanted to make the tower a symbol of the city. The water tower suffered no damage during World War II.

The water tower has two tanks for drinking water supply to the city center and the northern districts of Mönchengladbach. The lower tank with a volume of about 2300 cubic meters supplied the lower areas of Mönchengladbach. The upper tank with a capacity of 800 cubic meters ensured the water supply of the Upper Town.
