= Schloss Rheydt =

Coordinates: 51°10′55″N 6°28′55″E

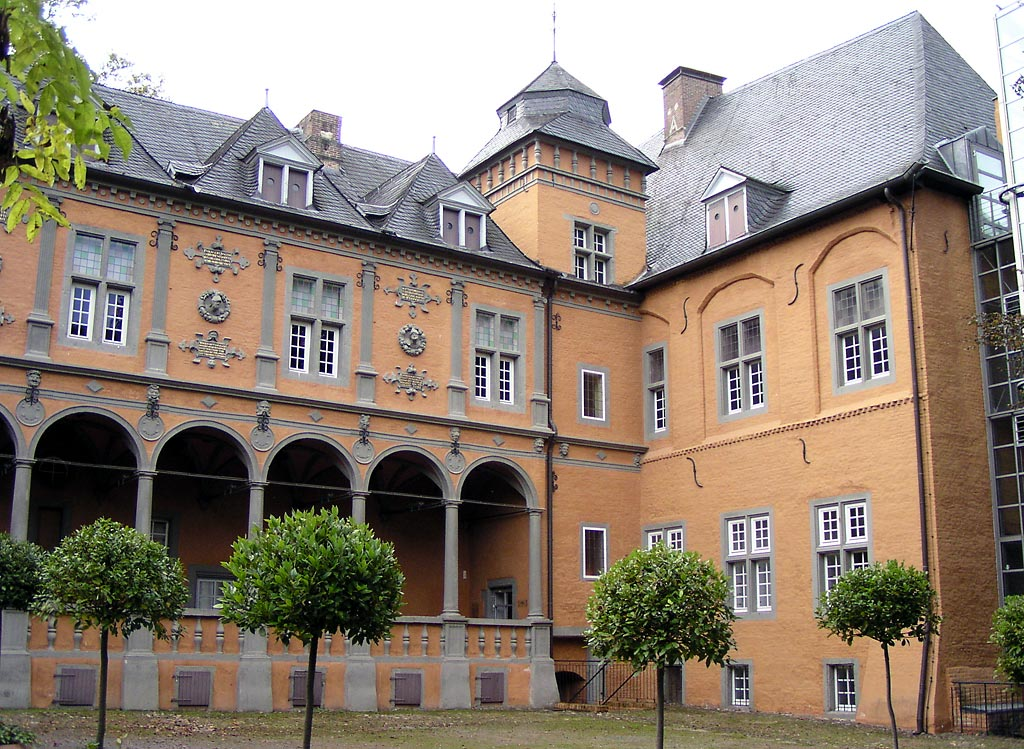
The north wing of Schloss Rheydt

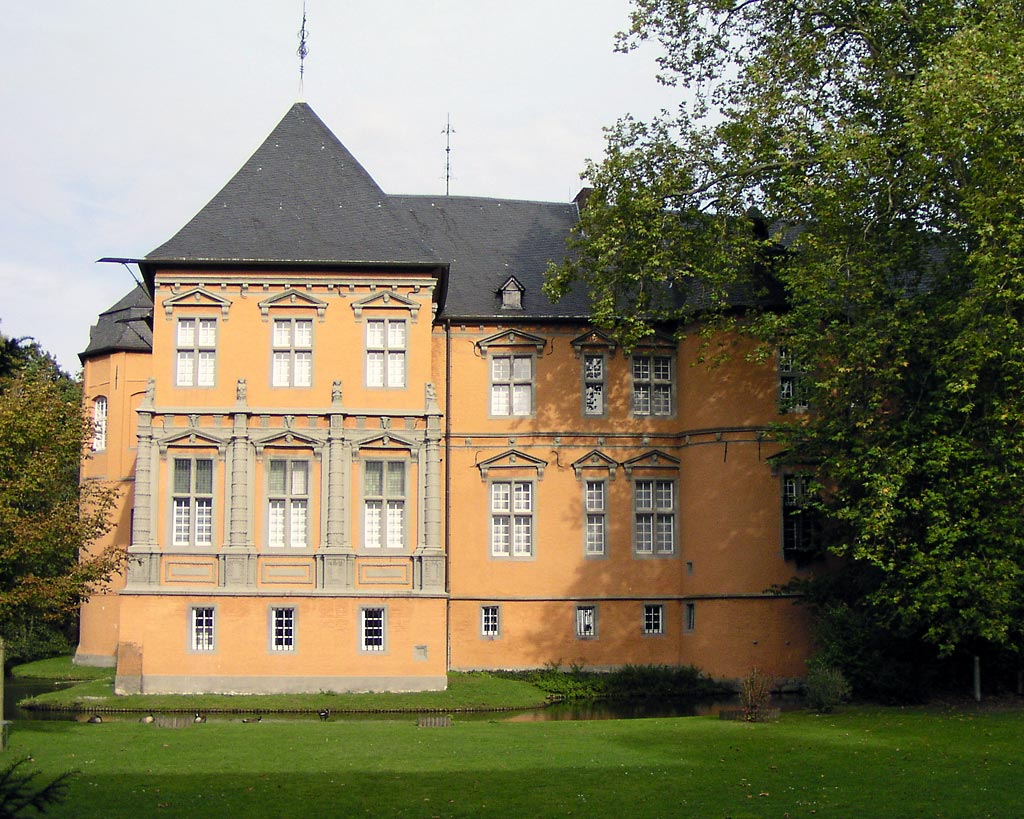
The east wing of Schloss Rheydt

Schloss Rheydt is a Renaissance palace in Rheydt, Mönchengladbach, North Rhine-Westphalia, Germany. Over the years the building has been the family seat of various noble families, including the Bylandt-Rheydt dynasty that ruled over Rheydt for over 300 years and gave the palace its present look.

== History ==
Originally a castle dating from 1060, the palace has evolved over the years to become the palace it is today. The castle's first documented mention dates to 1180, made by the Cologne Archbishop Philip I when he mentioned revenues that were to be collected from the then castle owner, the Lord of Rheydt, in his correspondence. The first Lord of the castle mentioned by name is William of Heppendorf.

Otto von Bylandt had the existing exterior facade created by Maximilian Pasqualini (1534–1572), son of the Italian architect Alessandro Pasqualini. Pasqualini renovated in the style of his father, adding casemates and bastions and creating a moat around the palace. Pasqualini also considerably renovated the interior by adding fireplaces, statues, and various paintings. Most of Pasqualini's work remains in very good condition.

Throughout the 19th century, the palace changed hands many times. However, the owners were unable to maintain the palace due to the upkeep costs. Gradually the palace fell into disrepair. The palace was purchased by the town of Rheydt from the last private owner in 1917. From the years of 1933 to 1945 Joseph Goebbels was an honorary citizen of Rheydt and frequently would live there over that period of time. Since then the palace has undergone some restoration (1988–1993) and vast parts of Schloss Rheydt have been converted into museum areas and reopened. The palace was awarded the European Museum of the Year Award by the European Museum Forum in 1978. An annual medieval festival as well as an annual music festival, the so-called "Sommermusik Schloss Rheydt", also takes place at Schloss Rheydt.
