= Mönchengladbach =

Mönchengladbach Jlabbach (Limburgish)
- City
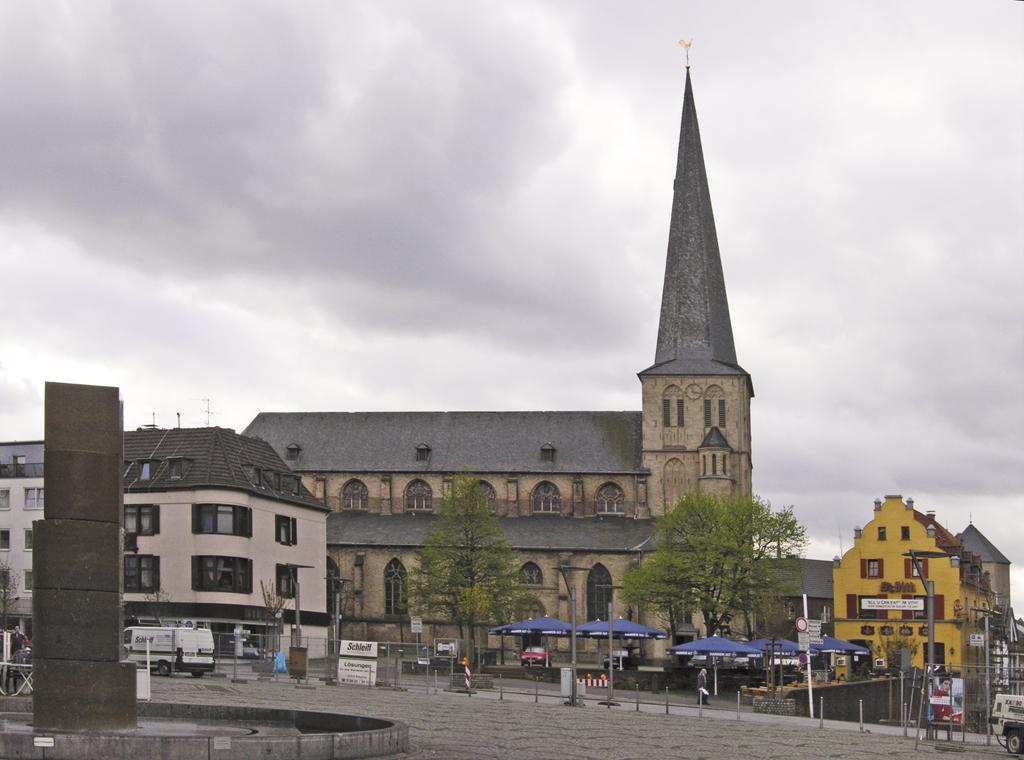
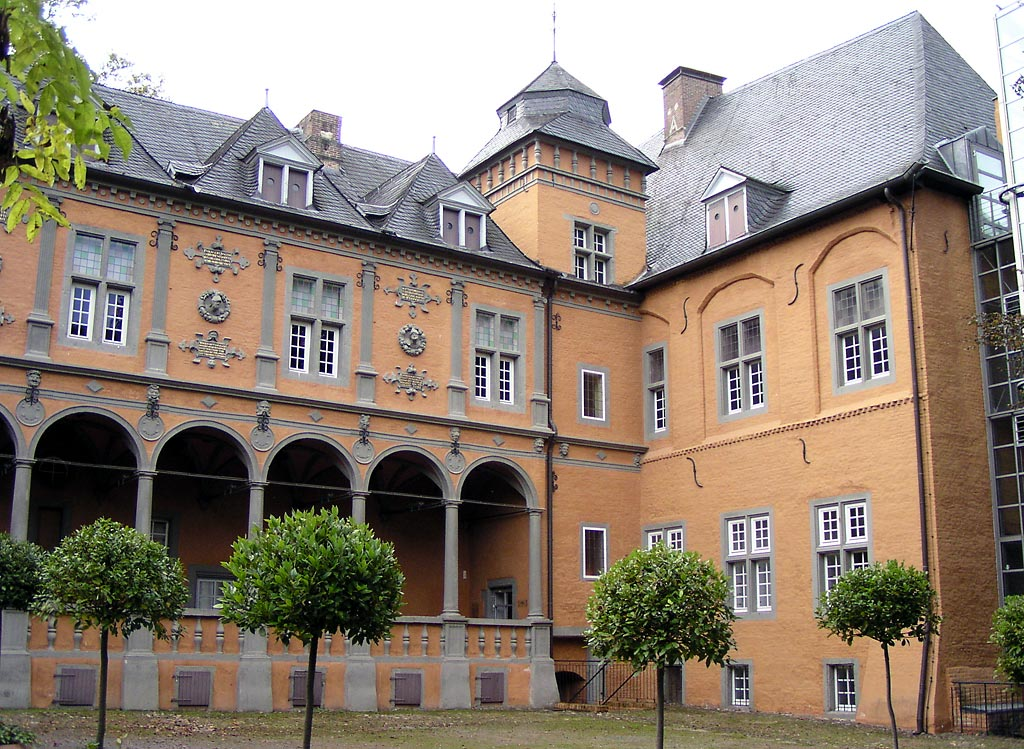
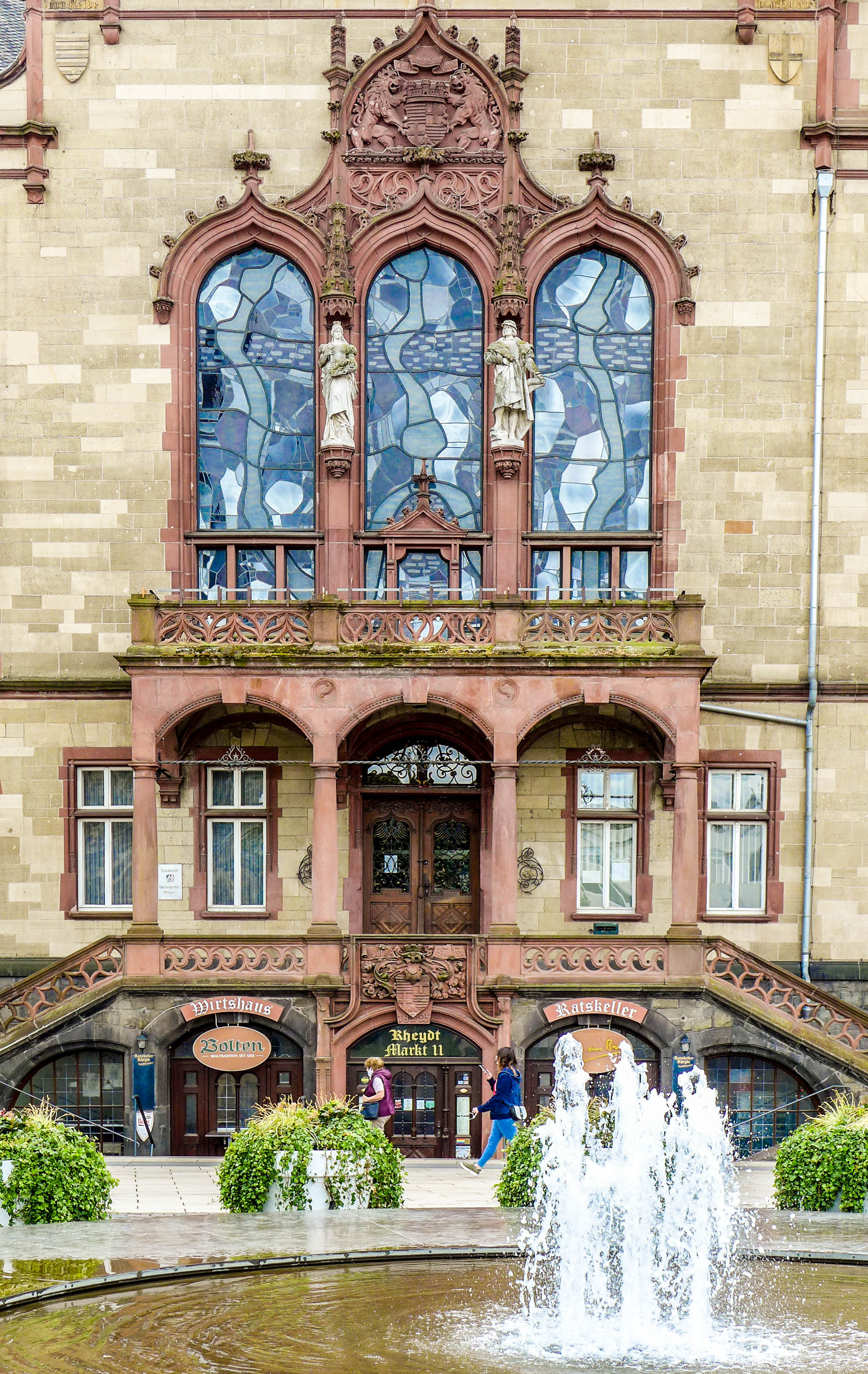
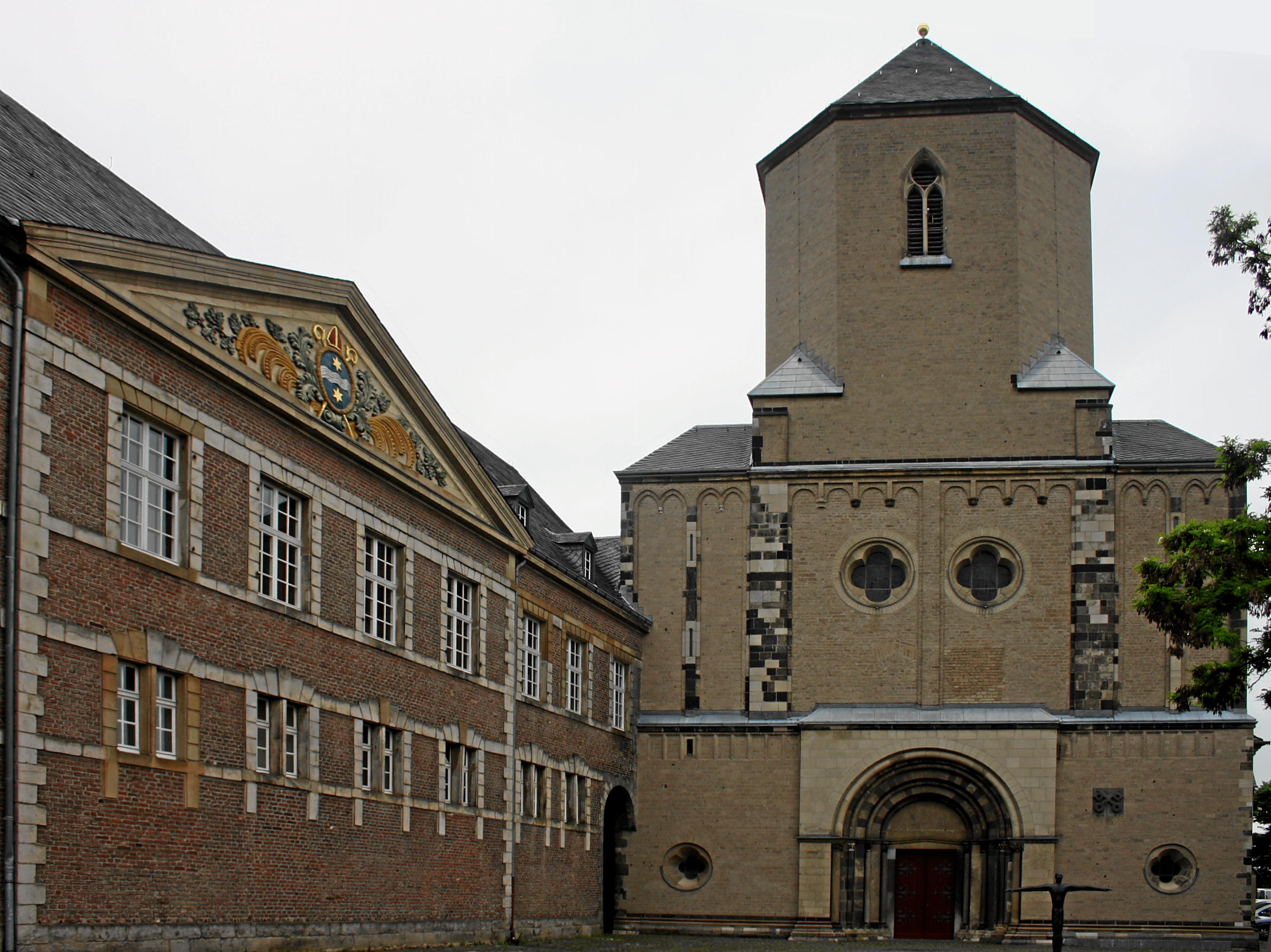
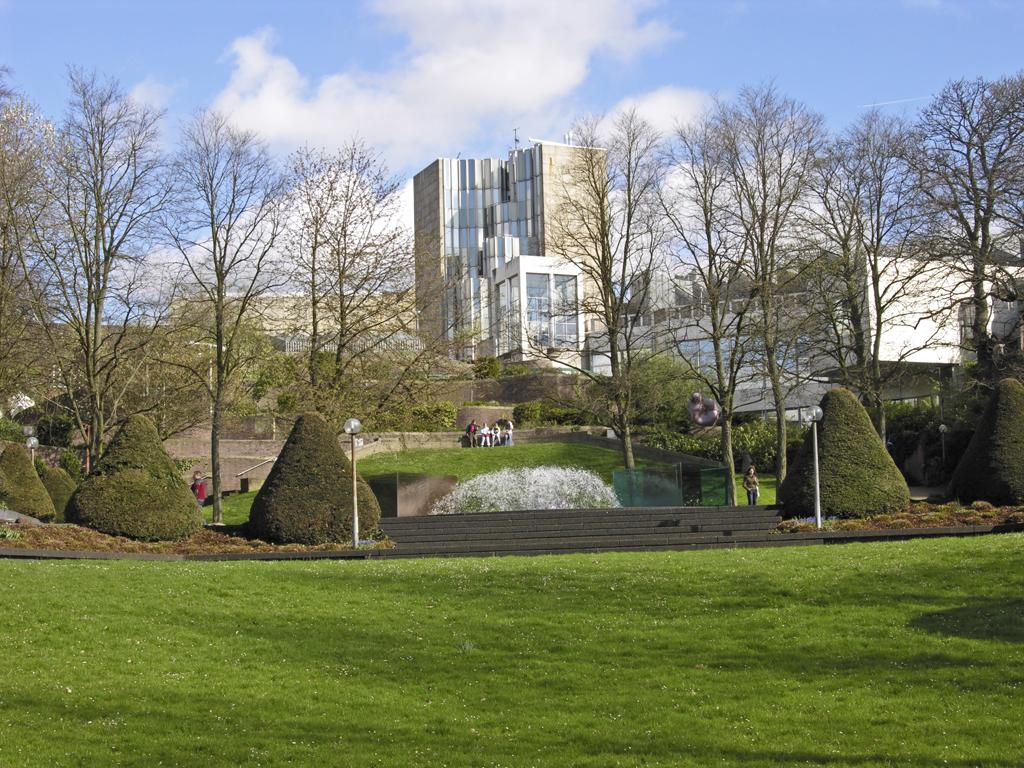
- Old Market in Gladbach Schloss Rheydt Rheydt Townhall Gladbach Abbey Abteiberg Museum

- Flag Coat of arms

- Location of Mönchengladbach in North Rhine-Westphalia
- Interactive map of Mönchengladbach
- Location within Germany Location within North Rhine-Westphalia
- Coordinates: 51°12′N 06°26′E
- Country: Germany
- State: North Rhine-Westphalia
- Admin. region: Düsseldorf
- District: Urban district

Government
  - Mayor (2020–30): Felix Heinrichs (SPD)

Area
  - Total: 170.43 km^{2} (65.80 sq mi)
- Elevation: 70 m (230 ft)

Population (2025-12-31)
  - Total: 267,176
  - Density: 1,567.7/km^{2} (4,060.2/sq mi)
- Time zone: UTC+01:00 (CET)
  - Summer (DST): UTC+02:00 (CEST)
- Postal codes: 41001–41239
- Dialling codes: 02161, 02166
- Vehicle registration: MG
- Website: www.moenchengladbach.de

Mönchengladbach (German: [mœnçn̩ˈɡlatbax]; Limburgish: Jlabbach [jəˈlɑbɑx]) is a city in North Rhine-Westphalia, western Germany, west of the Rhine, halfway between Düsseldorf and the Dutch border.

== History ==
=== Name and origins ===
The original name of the city was Gladbach, by which it is still often known today. To distinguish it from another town of the same name (the present Bergisch Gladbach), it took the name München-Gladbach ("Monks' Gladbach", in reference to the abbey) in 1888. Between 1933 and 1950, it was written München Gladbach (short: M.Gladbach), without a hyphen. This spelling was seen as potentially misleading, as it could imply that Gladbach was a borough of Munich (German: München), so consequently the name was changed to Mönchen-Gladbach in 1950 (and subsequently Mönchengladbach in 1960) to avoid confusion.

The town was founded around Gladbach Abbey in 974. It was named after the Gladbach, a narrow brook which mostly runs underground today. The abbey and adjoining villages became a town in the 14th century. The town of Rheydt is located nearby and is incorporated into Mönchengladbach today.

=== Early history ===
The first settlements in the area of Mönchengladbach are approximately 300,000–400,000 years old and show remains of Homo erectus and Neanderthal. There are numerous cairns from the Neolithic and Bronze Ages.

The history of Mönchengladbach began with the construction of the Gladbach Minster and the founding of an abbey in the year 974 by Gero, Archbishop of Cologne, and his companion, the monk Sandrad of Trier.

To improve the settlement, the monks created a market north of the church in the 12th century. Craftsmen settled near the market. Gladbach received its town charter in 1364–1366. The "town" erected a town wall made of stone, which had to be maintained by the citizens. Remains of the wall can be found at the Geroweiher, as can remains of the "Thick Tower", an old fortified tower at the Waldhausener hill. Until the end of the 18th century, the city belonged to the department of Grevenbroich within the Duchy of Jülich.

On 4 October 1794, the armed forces of the French Revolution marched into the town, one day before the fortress Jülich had been handed over. When the Holy Roman Emperor Francis II ceded the left bank of the river Rhine to France with the Treaty of Lunéville in 1801, Gladbach fell under French laws suppressing clericalism. This was the end of the abbey; the monastery was closed. On 31 October 1802, the last 31 monks left the monastery. The contents of the tremendous abbey library, well known outside Germany, were scattered or destroyed.

From 1798 until 1814, the Mairie Gladbach was part of Canton Odenkirchen, of the Arrondissement Krefeld, of the Roer Département.

=== Recent history ===
In 1815, Gladbach became part of the Kingdom of Prussia and seat of the Landkreis Gladbach, which was dissolved in 1929. In 1815 Gladbach became seat of the Bürgermeisterei (Office of mayor), which was split in 1859 into two parts: the City of Gladbach and Office of Mayor Obergeburth. The latter was renamed to München-Gladbach-Land in 1907.

From 1933 through 1975, the neighborhood of Rheydt was an independent city; the split from München-Gladbach was arranged by Joseph Goebbels, who was born locally. After reuniting with Mönchengladbach, the central station (Rheydt Hauptbahnhof) kept its original name, making Mönchengladbach the only city in Germany to have two rail stations each called Hauptbahnhof.

In response to the 10 May 1940 German invasion of Belgium, Mönchengladbach was bombed by RAF Bomber Command on the evening of 11 May. The bomber crews were attempting to interdict German troop movements on roads, intersections and rail lines in the area, especially the city's railyards. About half of the approximately 36 twin-engine Royal Air Force (RAF) bombers reportedly hit their targets, and three were shot down. Four people were killed on the ground, including a British woman living in Germany.

Forced laborers of the 3rd SS construction brigade were sent to work in the city in 1943.

The Prussian Rhine Province was dissolved after World War II, with the city becoming part of the new state of North Rhine-Westphalia, which was formed in 1946.

== Demographics ==
Historical population

Year	Pop.	±% p.a.
1965	263,706	—
1970	264,423	+0.05%
1975	261,373	−0.23%
1980	258,430	−0.23%
1985	254,503	−0.31%
1990	259,436	+0.38%
1995	266,702	+0.55%

Year	Pop.	±% p.a.
2000	263,014	−0.28%
2005	261,444	−0.12%
2010	257,993	−0.27%
2015	259,996	+0.15%
2020	259,665	−0.03%
2025	267,176	+0.57%

Population size may be affected by changes in administrative divisions. Source: Landesdatabank Nordrhein-Westfalen

Largest groups of foreign residents
Nationality	Population (31.12 2022)
Turkey	6,614
Poland	4,538
Syria	4,027
Romania	3,266
Bulgaria	2,872
Ukraine	2,643
Spain	2,326
Italy	1,860
Greece	1,651
Netherlands	1,437

== Geography ==
=== Municipal subdivisions ===
Map of Mönchengladbach showing the boroughs, districts and postal zones

Since 2009, the territory of Mönchengladbach has comprised four (previously ten) boroughs which are subdivided into 44 districts.

The boroughs and their associated districts were:

- Nord: Am Wasserturm, Dahl, Eicken, Gladbach, Hardt-Mitte, Hardter Wald, Ohler, Venn, Waldhausen, Westend, Windberg
- Ost: Bettrath‑Hoven, Bungt, Flughafen, Giesenkirchen‑Mitte, Giesenkirchen‑Nord, Hardterbroich‑Pesch, Lürrip, Neuwerk‑Mitte, Schelsen, Uedding
- Süd: Bonnenbroich‑Geneicken, Geistenbeck, Grenzland‑Stadion, Heyden, Hockstein, Mülfort, Odenkirchen‑Mitte, Odenkirchen‑West, Pongs, Rheydt, Sasserath, Schloss Rheydt, Schmölderpark, Schrievers
- West: Hauptquartier, Hehn, Holt, Rheindahlen‑Land, Rheindahlen‑Mitte, Wanlo, Wickrath-Mitte, Wickrath‑West, Wickrathberg

=== Climate ===
Climate data for Mönchengladbach (1991-2020)
Month	Jan	Feb	Mar	Apr	May	Jun	Jul	Aug	Sep	Oct	Nov	Dec	Year
Daily mean °C (°F)	3.3 (37.9)	3.8 (38.8)	6.7 (44.1)	10.4 (50.7)	14.2 (57.6)	17.1 (62.8)	19.1 (66.4)	18.6 (65.5)	15.0 (59.0)	11.0 (51.8)	6.9 (44.4)	4.0 (39.2)	10.8 (51.5)
Average precipitation mm (inches)	60.8 (2.39)	57.0 (2.24)	51.5 (2.03)	41.1 (1.62)	58.3 (2.30)	63.9 (2.52)	70.9 (2.79)	72.3 (2.85)	59.0 (2.32)	59.9 (2.36)	60.6 (2.39)	70.4 (2.77)	725.7 (28.58)
Mean monthly sunshine hours	54.2	73.1	125.7	174	201.6	204.4	211.3	197.3	149.3	107.5	58.8	43.6	1,600.8
Source: Deutscher Wetterdienst

== Economy ==
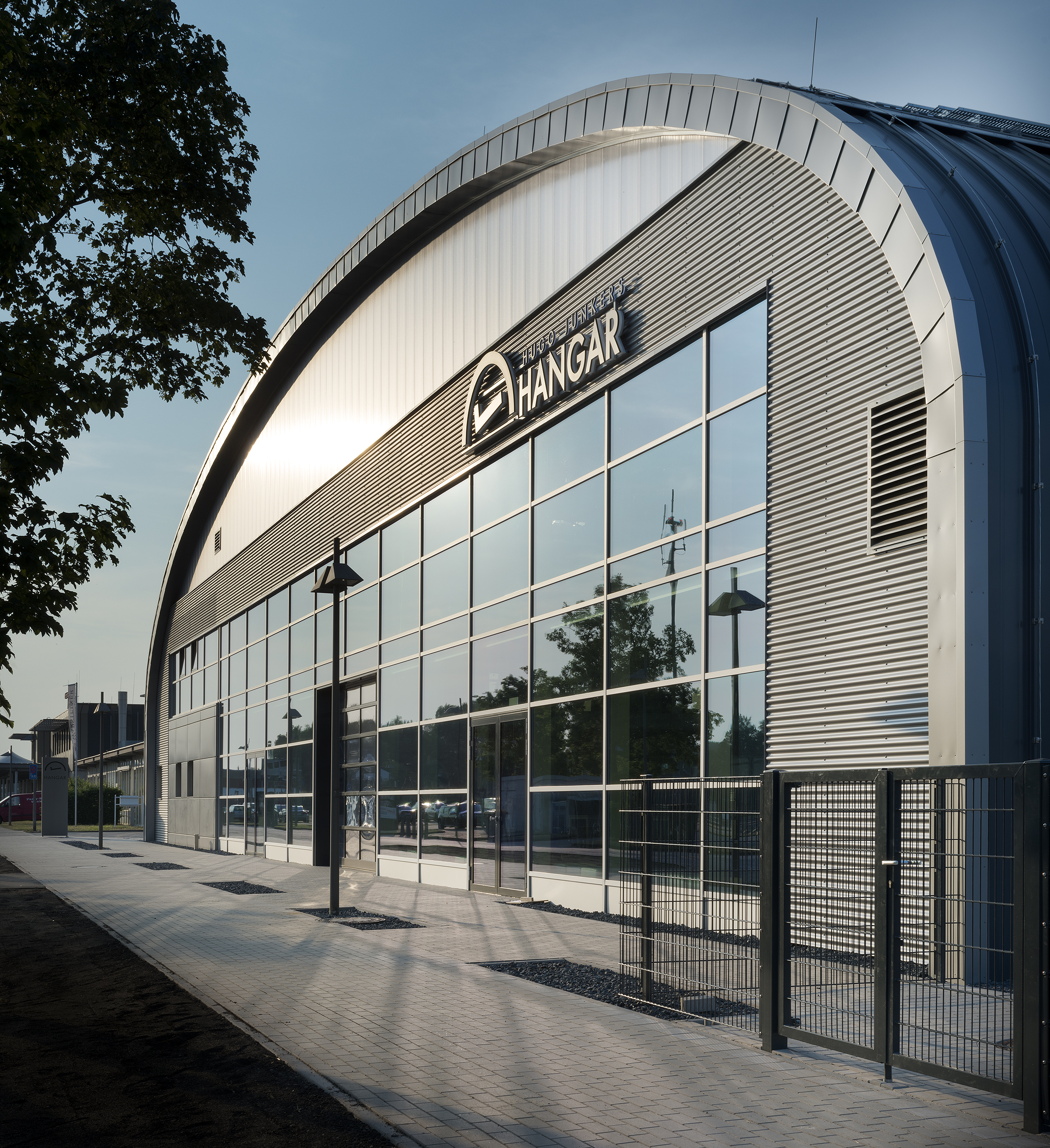
Hugo Junkers Hangar, aviation and event facility

Mönchengladbach's industrial ascent was mainly influenced by the development of the textile industry from the mid-19th to the mid-20th century. In addition, a textile-oriented machine industry also developed.

After the Second World War, a major structural change began, reducing the importance of the textile industry and attracting new economic sectors. At present, only 7 percent of employees work in the once dominant textile and clothing industry (for example: Van Laack and gardeur).

As part of the successful diversification of the business location, local government and representatives founded the Mönchengladbach Business Development Corporation (WFMG) in 1997. WFMG and the University of Applied Sciences Niederrhein have developed a five-pillar model for the future orientation of the business location. Thereafter textile and fashion, mechanical engineering and electrical engineering, logistics, the creative industry and the health sector are the leading sectors for the economic future of the city of Mönchengladbach. As part of an active cluster policy, the WFMG has partly initiated its own networks for these industries.

The most important employer in Mönchengladbach is the Santander Consumer Bank, which has its headquarters at Aachener Straße in Mönchengladbach's city center.

The economic structure includes: tool and spinning machines (Dörries Scharmann, Monforts, Trützschler, Schlafhorst), automatic conveyor systems, signal and system technology (Scheidt & Bachmann), transformers (SMS Meer), cables (Nexans Germany formerly Kabelwerk Rheydt), printed matter and foodstuffs.

Chocolatier Heinemann is known beyond the city limits for his cakes, pralines and baked goods, which he offers in cafés on site as well as in Düsseldorf and Munich. Furthermore, beer breweries are represented in Mönchengladbach. The Oettinger brewery produces at the site of the former Hannen brewery. The Hensen brewery has been producing a lower Rhine-type Altbier since 2015 at the former spring of the river Gladbach in the Waldhausen district.

Especially in the 1970s and 1980s, nightlife was attractive to young party people from Düsseldorf. In the meantime, tourism in particular is playing a certain role. Mönchengladbach has about 40 hotels (for example: Hotel Burgund) and inns as well as a youth hostel in the district Hardter Wald. In total, there are about 2,000 beds. The number of overnight stays is over 200,000 annually.

Mönchengladbach Airport is dominated by general aviation. There are currently no scheduled services to and from Mönchengladbach. Additionally, there are few business-charter passenger flights. In June 2015, Hugo Junkers Hangar was opened as an aviation and event facility. Airplane enthusiasts can book sightseeing flights with Junkers Ju 52 from the 1940s. The next major international airport Düsseldorf Airport is only 20 kilometres (12 mi) away to the east.

== Politics ==
=== Mayor ===
The current mayor of Mönchengladbach is Felix Heinrichs of the Social Democratic Party (SPD) since 2020. The most recent mayoral election was held on 13 September 2020, with a runoff held on 27 September, and the results were as follows:

Candidate	Party	First round		Second round	
Candidate	Party	Votes	%	Votes	%
Felix Heinrichs	Social Democratic Party	32,808	37.5	50,421	74.2
Frank Boss	Christian Democratic Union	25,929	29.6	17,513	25.8
Boris Wolkowski	Alliance 90/The Greens	15,304	17.5		
Corina Bülow	Alternative for Germany	4,706	5.4		
Stefan Dahlmanns	Free Democratic Party	3,149	3.6		
Sebastian Merkens	The Left	3,010	3.4		
Chana Clarissa Lischewski	Die PARTEI	1,914	2.2		
Franz Josef Schiller	Ecological Democratic Party	540	0.6		
Sandra van den Broek	National Democratic Party	186	0.2		
Valid votes		87,546	97.3	67,934	99.3
Invalid votes		2,473	2.7	496	0.7
Total		90,019	100.0	68,430	100.0
Electorate/voter turnout		207,117	43.5	207,018	33.1
Source: State Returning Officer

=== City council ===
Results of the 2020 city council election

The Mönchengladbach city council governs the city alongside the mayor. The most recent city council election was held on 13 September 2020, and the results were as follows:

Party	Votes	%	±	Seats	±
Christian Democratic Union (CDU)	30,198	34.0	▼7.5	26	▼3
Social Democratic Party (SPD)	22,365	25.2	▼4.3	20	±0
Alliance 90/The Greens (Grüne)	18,879	21.2	▲10.6	16	▲9
Alternative for Germany (AfD)	5,282	5.9	▲4.5	5	▲4
Free Democratic Party (FDP)	4,911	5.5	▲1.0	4	▲1
The Left (Die Linke)	3,605	4.1	▼0.4	3	±0
Die PARTEI (PARTEI)	2,419	2.7	▲1.5	2	▲1
Ecological Democratic Party (ÖDP)	507	0.6	New	0	New
Alliance for Innovation and Justice (BIG)	439	0.5	New	0	New
National Democratic Party (NPD)	229	0.3	▼0.6	0	▼1
Independents	30	0.0	–	0	–
Valid votes	88,864	98.7			
Invalid votes	1,160	1.3			
Total	90,024	100.0		76	▲8
Electorate/voter turnout	207,117	43.5	▲0.8		
Source: State Returning Officer

== Points of interest ==
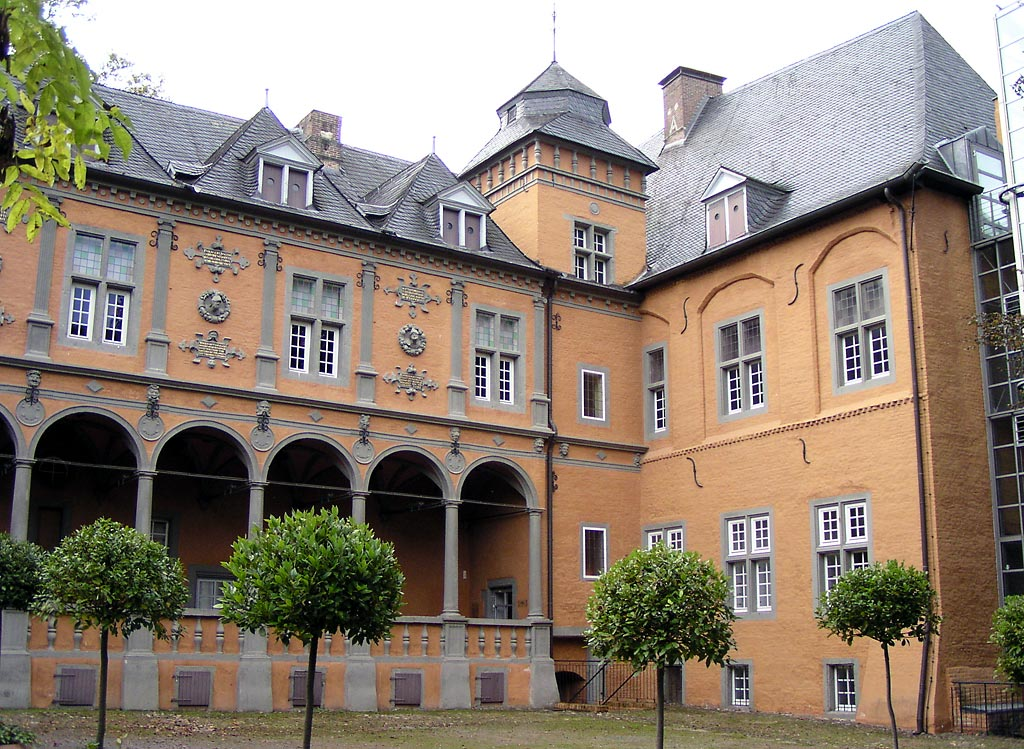
Rheydt Castle

- Municipal Abteiberg Museum for contemporary art
- Municipal Museum Schloss Rheydt for fine art
- Museum im Wasserturm Rheindahlen for relics of the Stone Age
- Museum Altes Zeughaus e. V. for Carnival
- Museum Schloss Wickrath for ornithology
- Bunter Garten, municipal park with botanical garden and arboretum
- Wasserturm Mönchengladbach

== Twin towns – sister cities ==
Mönchengladbach is twinned with:

- (United Kingdom) Bradford, England, UK (1971)
- (United Kingdom) North Tyneside, England, UK (1958)
- Roubaix, France (1969)
- Roermond, Netherlands (1971)
- (United Kingdom) Thurrock, England, UK (1969)
- Verviers, Belgium (1970)

== Transport ==
The city has two main railway stations: Mönchengladbach Hauptbahnhof and Rheydt Hauptbahnhof, the result of the merger of the two cities, in which the deprecated name for Rheydt Hbf was never removed. Line 8 of the Rhine-Ruhr S-Bahn connects the city to Düsseldorf and Hagen; an extension further westwards is being discussed. A number of regional trains serve Mönchengladbach, including regional line RE13 to the city of Venlo which is located in the Netherlands. By the end of 2009 it was the largest city in Germany without regular long-distance services. With the new schedule for 2010, Mönchengladbach got an InterCity/Intercity-Express connection twice a week.

The city also has a commercial airport called Mönchengladbach Airport. However, there are no schedule flights to and from the airport. The nearest passenger airports are Düsseldorf Airport, located 34 km (21 mi) north east, and Cologne Bonn Airport, located 79 km (49 mi) south east of Mönchengladbach.

Local bus and rail transport is carried out by the NEW-AG under the VRR transport association regulations.

== Sports ==
=== Football ===
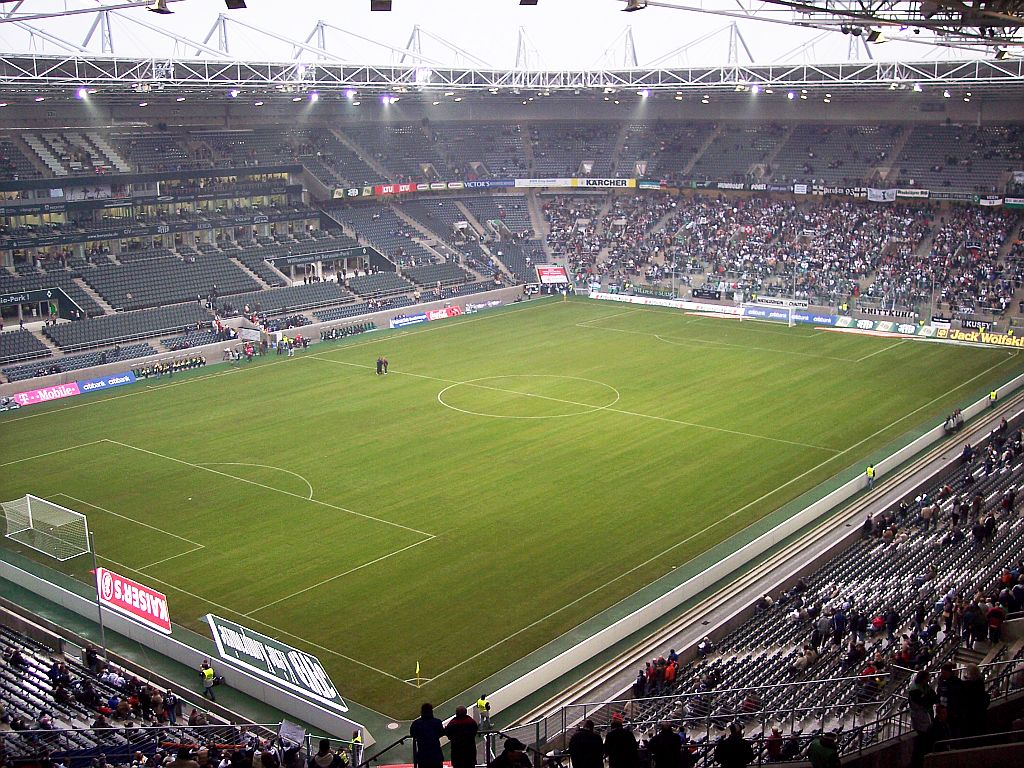
Borussia-Park, stadium of Borussia Mönchengladbach

Mönchengladbach has a long football tradition. Its home club, Borussia Mönchengladbach, is one of the country's most well-known, best-supported, and successful teams. The club plays on the Borussia-Park stadium with a capacity of 54,057. The club has the sixth largest fan club in Germany, "The Foals" (Die Fohlen), with more than 50,000 active members.

=== Field hockey ===
The city hosted three International Field Hockey world championships: the 2006 Men's World Hockey Cup, the 2008 Women's Hockey Champions Trophy, and the 2010 Men's Hockey Champions Trophy.

=== Harness racing ===
Since 1892, Mönchengladbach has owned a harness racing track called Trabrennbahn Mönchengladbach (Trotting track Mönchengladbach).

== Military ==
Until December 2013, the Rheindahlen Military Complex was located just outside Mönchengladbach, where it was home to the headquarters of the British Armed Forces in Germany.

== Notable people ==
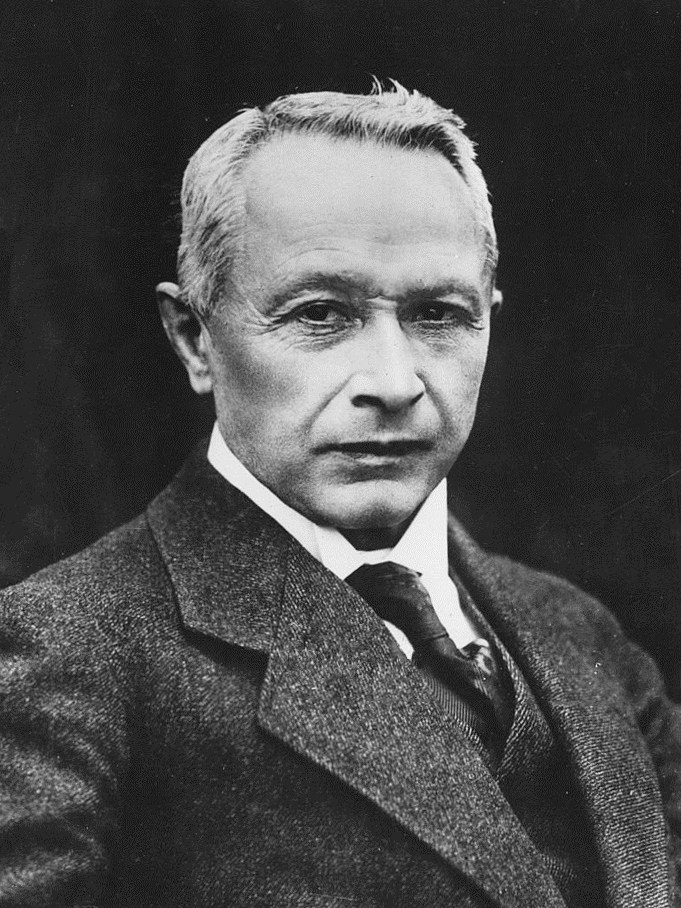
Hugo Junkers

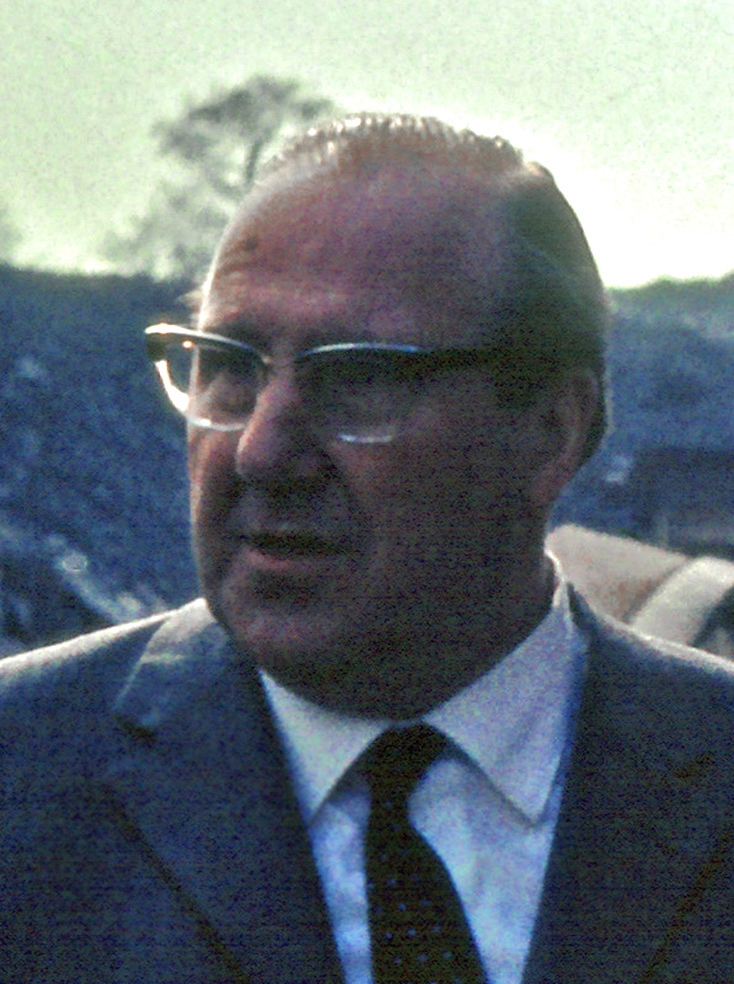
Franz Meyers

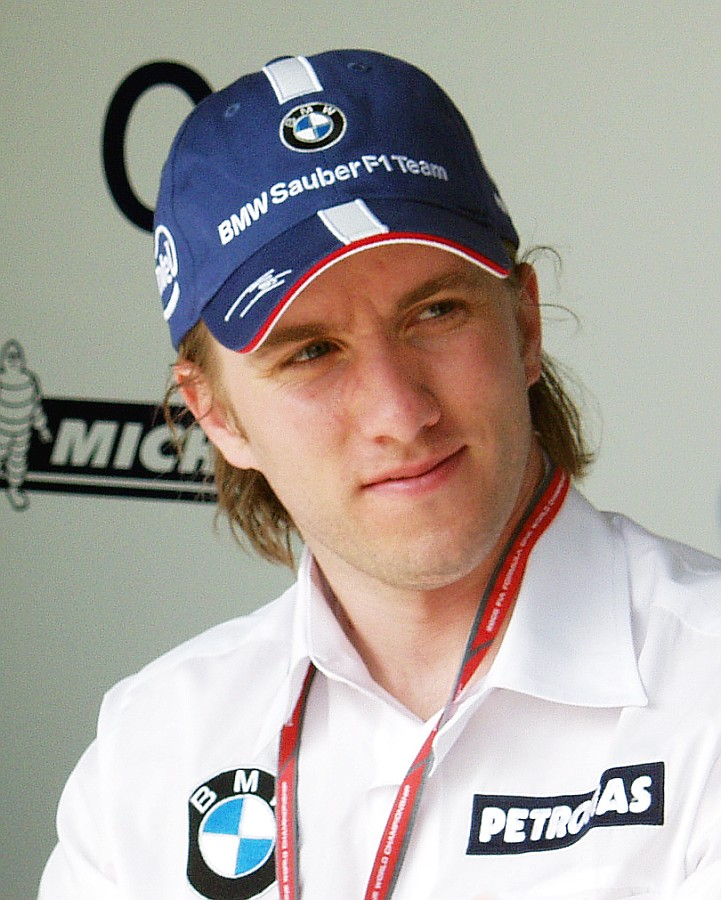
Nick Heidfeld

- Jacob Masen (1606–1681), Jesuit priest, historian, dramatist and theologian
- Hugo Junkers (1859–1935), engineer and entrepreneur
- Lisel Haas (1898–1989), photographer
- Hans Jonas (1903–1993), philosopher and scholar, wrote extensively on ethics
- Franz Meyers (1908–2002), politician (CDU), former minister-president North Rhine-Westphalia
- Elisabeth Gottschalk (1912–1989), German-born Dutch historical geographer and professor
- Jack Zunz (1923–2018), civil and structural engineer, former chairman of Ove Arup & Partners, principal structural designer of the Sydney Opera House
- Dietrich Nummert (1928–2021), journalist
- Petra Schürmann (1933–2010), Miss World 1956
- Shakuntala Banerjee (born 1973) television presenter
- Hildegard Uhrmacher (born 1939), operatic soprano
- Peter Klusen (born 1951), writer, translator and cartoonist
- Karl Jansen-Winkeln (born 1955), Egyptologist
- Reinhold Ewald (born 1956), physicist and ESA astronaut
- Walter Moers (born 1957), author
- Joscho Stephan (born 1979), gypsy jazz guitarist
- Joko Winterscheidt (born 1979), television presenter
- Lena Zingsheim-Zobel (born 1993), politician

=== Sport ===
- Joseph Pilates (1883–1967), physical trainer, proponent of the Pilates method
- Hans Heyer (born 1943), racing driver
- Horst-Dieter Höttges (1943–2023), footballer
- Günter Netzer (born 1944), footballer
- Jupp Heynckes (born 1945), footballer and manager
- Erwin Kremers (born 1949), footballer
- Ulrike von der Groeben (born 1957), television sport journalist
- Michael Frontzeck (born 1964), footballer
- Ellen Lohr (born 1965), racing driver
- Heinz-Harald Frentzen (born 1967), Formula One driver
- Torsten Kratz (born 1970), racing driver
- Jorg Albertz (born 1971), footballer
- Nick Heidfeld (born 1977), Formula One driver
- Sven Heidfeld (born 1978), racing driver
- Marcell Jansen (born 1985), footballer
- Isabell Herlovsen (born 1988), Norwegian footballer
- Marc-André ter Stegen (born 1992), footballer

== See also ==
- Van Laack (1881)
