= Gladbach (Niers) =

River in Germany

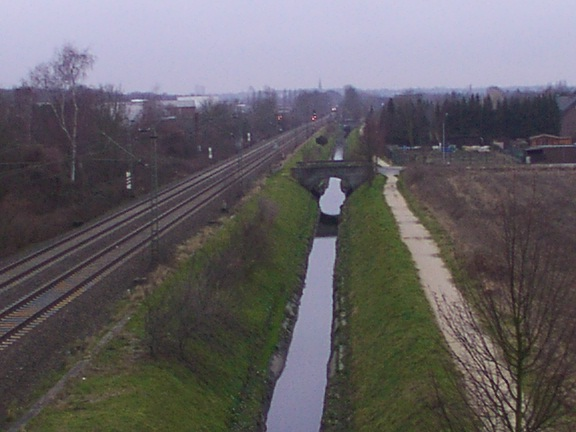

Location
- Country: Germany
- States: North Rhine-Westphalia

Physical characteristics
- Mouth
  - location: Niers
  - coordinates: 51.1977°N 6.4932°E

Basin features
- Progression: Niers→ Meuse→ North Sea

Gladbach is a narrow, short waterway of North Rhine-Westphalia, Germany. It is 1.9 km long and flows into the Niers near Mönchengladbach.

== See also ==
- List of rivers of North Rhine-Westphalia
