= Rheydt =

- Borough of Mönchengladbach
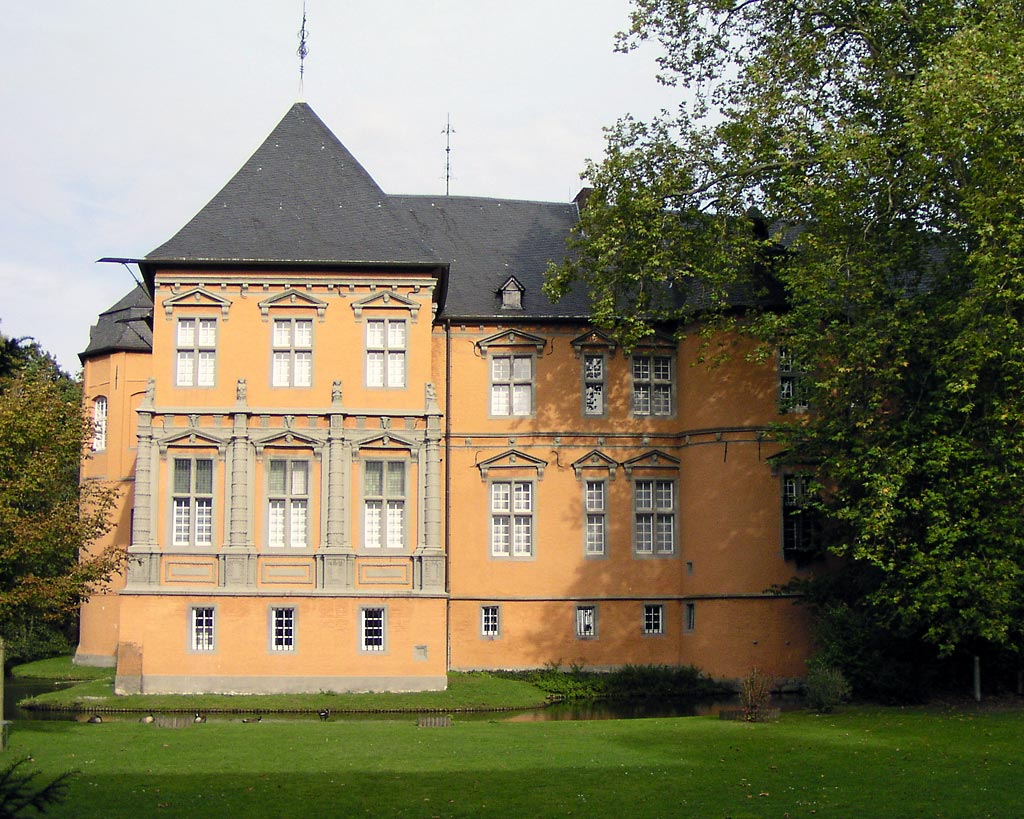
- Schloss Rheydt

- Coat of arms

- Location of Rheydt in Mönchengladbach
- Interactive map of Rheydt
- Location within Germany Location within North Rhine-Westphalia
- Coordinates: 51°10′N 06°27′E
- Country: Germany
- State: North Rhine-Westphalia
- Admin. region: Düsseldorf
- District: Urban district
- City: Mönchengladbach

Area
  - Total: 1.45 km^{2} (0.56 sq mi)

Population (2020-12-31)
  - Total: 14,389
  - Density: 9,920/km^{2} (25,700/sq mi)
- Time zone: UTC+01:00 (CET)
  - Summer (DST): UTC+02:00 (CEST)
- Postal codes: 41236, 41238, 41239
- Dialling codes: 02166

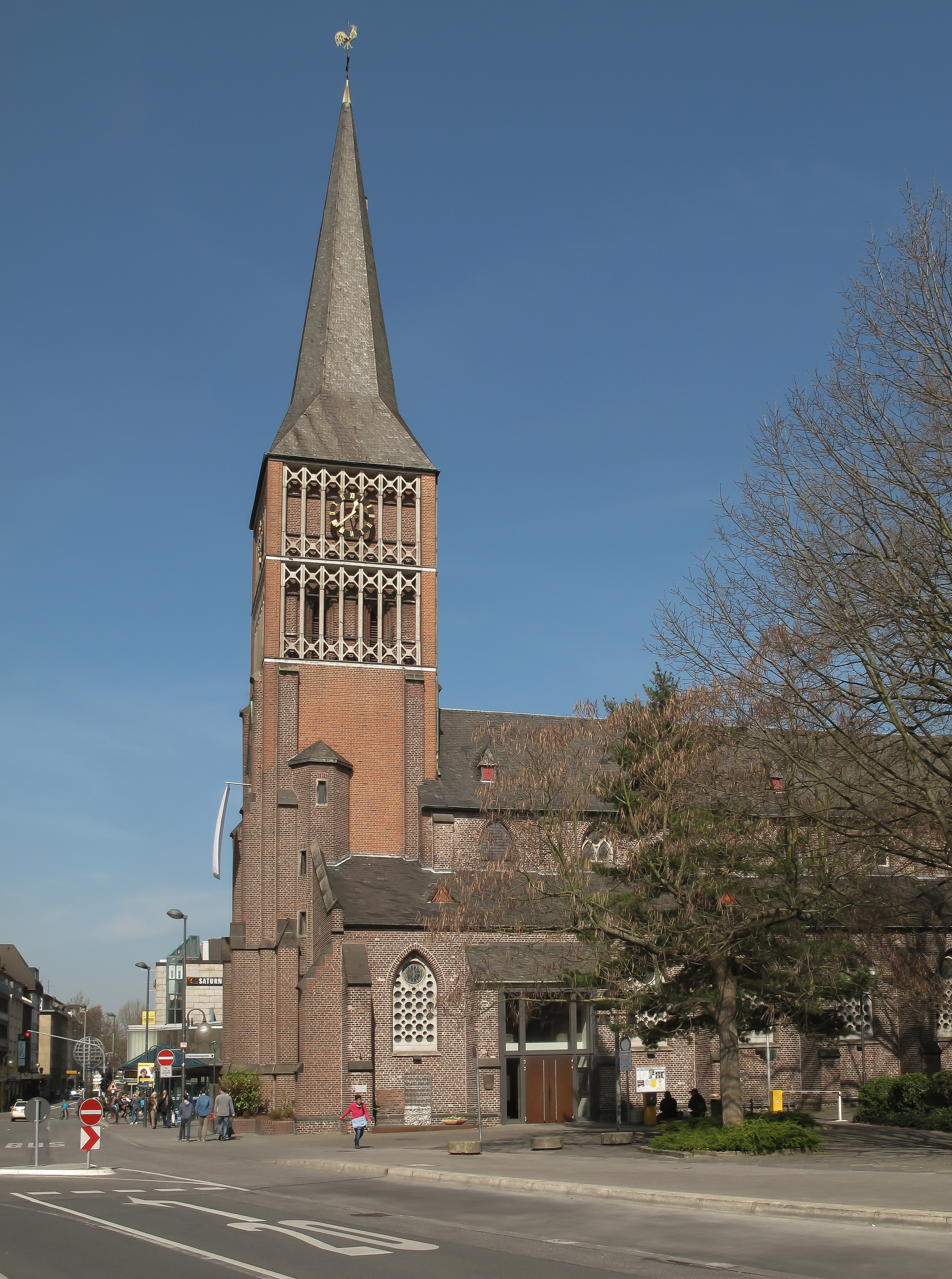
Church: die Sankt Marienkirche

Rheydt (German: [ˈʁaɪt]) is a borough of the German city Mönchengladbach, located in the west of North Rhine-Westphalia. Until 1918 and then again from 1933 (due to a split from Mönchengladbach arranged by Joseph Goebbels, who was born there) through 1975 it was an independent city. After merging with Mönchengladbach, the central station (Rheydt Hauptbahnhof) kept its original name, making Mönchengladbach the only city in Germany to have two stations called Hauptbahnhof.

Schloss Rheydt, one of the best-preserved palaces of the Renaissance period, is located in Rheydt.

== Mayors 1808–1974 ==
- 1808–1823: Dietrich Lenßen
- 1823–1857: Johann David Büschgens
- 1857–1877: Carl Theodorf von Velsen
- 1877–1893: Emil Pahlke
- 1893–1901: Dr. Wilhelm Strauß
- 1901–1905: Dr. Karl August Tettenborn
- 1906–1920: Paul Lehwald
- 1920–1929: Dr. Oskar Graemer
- 1929–1930: Franz Gielen
- 1930–1933: Dr. Johannes Handschumacher
- 1933: Wilhelm Pelzer
- 1934–1936: Edwin Renatus Robert August Hasenjaeger
- 1936–1940: Heinz Gebauer
- 1940–1945: Dr. Alexander Doemens
- 1945: August Brocher
- 1945–1948: Dr. Carl Marcus
- 1948–1950: Heinrich Pesch
- 1950–1956: Johannes Scheulen
- 1956–1961: Wilhelm Schiffer
- 1961–1963: Dr. Friedrich Hinnah
- 1963–1964: Fritz Rahmen
- 1964–1969: Wilhelm Schiffer
- 1969–1974: Fritz Rahmen

== Demographic development ==
Year	Population
1532	650
1794	2.776
1804	2.743
1830	2.200
3. December 1849 ¹	8.189
3. December 1861 ¹	10.200
3. December 1864 ¹	11.400
3. December 1867 ¹	12.200
1. December 1871 ¹	13.766
1. December 1875 ¹	15.835
1. December 1880 ¹	19.100

Year	Population
1. December 1885 ¹	22.658
1. December 1890 ¹	26.830
2. December 1895 ¹	30.102
1. December 1900 ¹	34.036
1. December 1905 ¹	40.149
1. December 1910 ¹	43.999
1. December 1916 ¹	38.468
5. December 1917 ¹	37.657
8. October 1919 ¹	42.821
16. June 1925 ¹	45.095
16. June 1933 ¹	77.261

Year	Population
17. May 1939 ¹	77.339
31. December 1945	65.755
29. October 1946 ¹	68.921
13. September 1950 ¹	78.302
25. September 1956 ¹	89.029
6. June 1961 ¹	94.004
31. December 1965	98.862
27. May 1970 ¹	100.077
31. December 1974	99.963

Note: ¹ - census

== Notable residents ==
- 1815, May 15, Friedrich Beckenbach, renamed Brookland + Jan 28 1892 in Rheydt, textile entrepreneur in Prussia, Holland and Yorkshire England, son of Johann Heinrich Beckenbach of Lenssen & Beckenbach, Rheydt
- 1859, February 3, Hugo Junkers, † February 3, 1935 in Gauting, engineer
- 1863, May 30, Klara Hechtenberg Collitz, † November 22, 1944 in Baltimore, German philologist
- 1876, September 4, Ernst Jakob Christoffel, † April 23, 1955 in Isfahan, founder of the Christoffel-Blindenmission
- 1894, August 29, Werner Gilles, † June 22, 1961 in Essen, artist
- 1894, February 24, Josef Arndgen, † September 20, 1966 in Wiesbaden, German politician (CDU)
- 1897, October 29, Joseph Goebbels, † May 1, 1945 in Berlin, Minister for Public Enlightenment and Propaganda during the Nazi regime
- 1898, July 24, Peter Erkens, † October 22, 1972 in Mönchengladbach, politician
- 1910, Emil Vorster, † 1976, race driver
- 1913, December 18, Wilhelm Schmitter, † November 8, 1943 in action over London, World War II Luftwaffe bomber pilot
- 1917, June 2, Heinz Sielmann, † October 6, 2006 in Munich, film maker
- 1918, May 6, Ruth Lommel,† 22 June 2012, actress
- 1919, June 3, Herbert Huppertz † June 8, 1944 Caen, Killed in Airbattle with American fighters. German Ace on FW 190 with 78 kills
- 1925, A. Edward Nussbaum, † 31 October 2009 in St. Louis, Missouri, theoretical mathematician
- 1928, April 1, Hermin Esser, tenor, † 2009 in Wiesbaden,
- 1930, May 16, Karl Heinz Beckurts, † July 9, 1986 in Straßlach, Munich, physicist, killed by Red Army Faction
- 1932, August 25, Alexander Arnz, † September 30, 2004 in Cologne, director
- 1936, August 9, Uwe Erichsen, author
- 1949, November 24, Christa Muth, systems scientist
- 1967, May 18, Heinz-Harald Frentzen, race driver
- 1973, February 24, Sonja Oberem, marathon runner
- 1977, May 10, Nick Heidfeld, race driver
