= Bebenhausen Abbey =

German monastery

- Kloster Bebenhausen
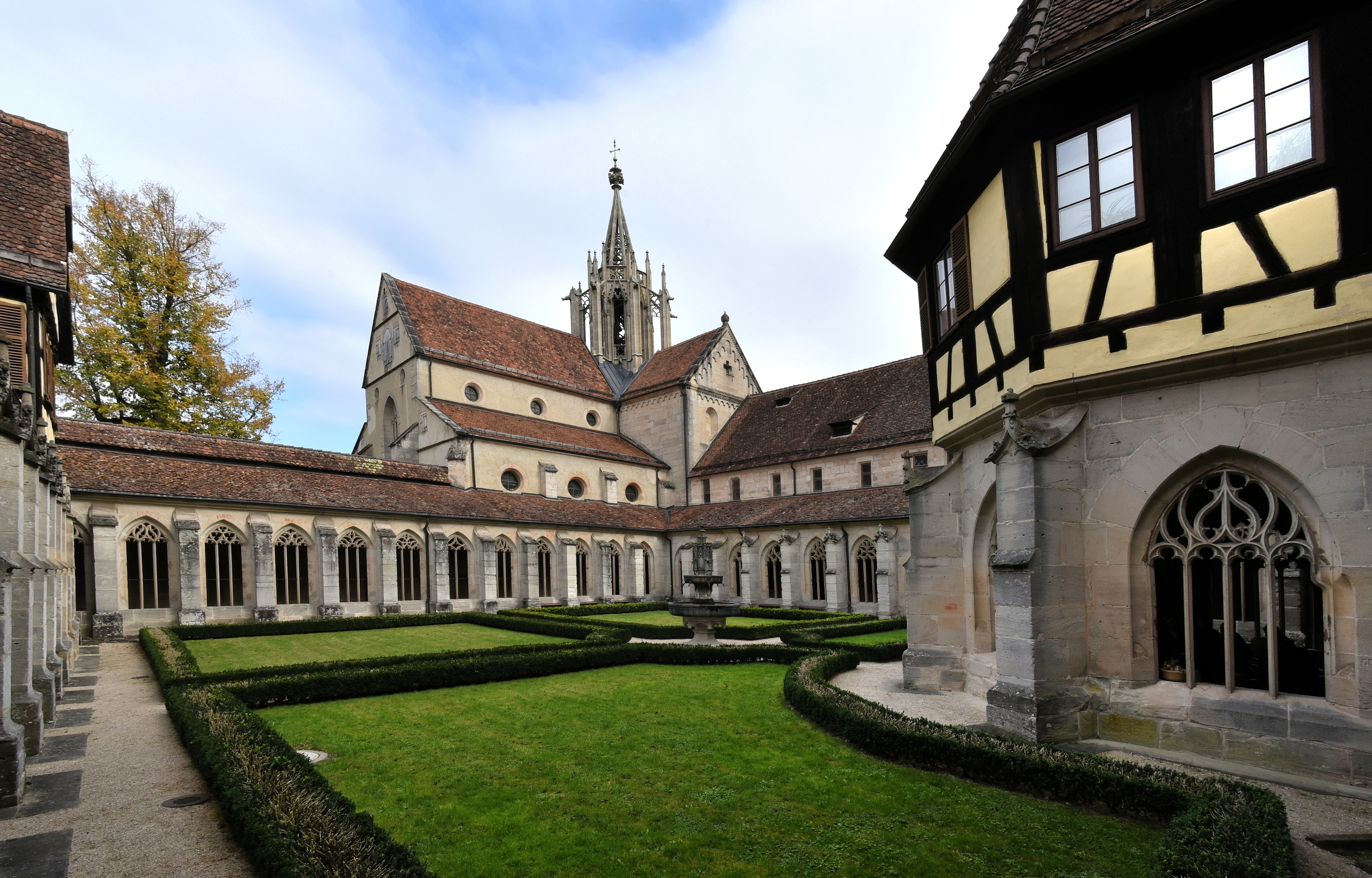
- Cloister seen from its southwest corner

- Location within Baden-Württemberg Location within Germany

General information
- Location: Bebenhausen, Germany
- Coordinates: 48°33′35″N 9°03′36″E
- Owner: Baden-Württemberg

Website
- www.kloster-bebenhausen.de/en/home

Bebenhausen Abbey (Kloster Bebenhausen) is a former Cistercian monastery complex located in Bebenhausen, Baden-Württemberg, Germany. The complex is also the location of Bebenhausen Palace, a hunting retreat created and maintained by two Kings of Württemberg. The complex was named a historic monument in 1974.

The monastery was established in the late 12th century by the Premonstratensians, but was ceded to the Cistercians in 1190. From the 13th to 15th centuries, Bebenhausen Abbey's fortunes grew rapidly until it became one of the richest monasteries in southern Germany. This period was also one of architectural expansion and renovation for the monastery. In the 14th century, it came under the dominion of the then County of Württemberg, whose rulers were later to dissolve the monastery in the 16th century. The abbey grounds were reused for a boarding school and Protestant seminary. Bebenhausen Abbey was also to play a brief role in post-World War II German politics, as the parliament of the French-controlled state of Württemberg-Hohenzollern devised their constitution at the monastery.

Bebenhausen Abbey also became a residence of the House of Württemberg as a hunting retreat and was especially favored by its rulers for its location in the Schönbuch. Württemberg's first king turned the south-eastern portion of the complex into a palace. After World War I, and the dissolution of the Kingdom of Württemberg, Bebenhausen Palace became the permanent residence of Württemberg's last king and queen.

== History ==
Bebenhausen Abbey was established around 1185, when Rudolph I, Count Palatine of Tübingen, donated Bebenhausen, then an abandoned village on the edge of the Schönbuch, to the Premonstratensian Order. Monks from Marchtal Abbey, another of Rudolph's endowments, settled in the village. It was with this company that the monastery was first documented in mid-1187, but the Premonstratensians abandoned the monastery later in the decade. Rudolph next gave Bebenhausen to the Cistercian Order, whose General Chapter at Cîteaux Abbey decided in 1190 to accept it and directed the Abbot of Schönau Abbey to establish a new monastery. In response, Rudolph granted the Cistercian project the freedom of not having to recognizing a vogt, a noble charged with lordship over and protection of a monastery, in mid-1211. The church of the new monastery was consecrated in 1228 by the Bishop of Constance.

Under the Cistercians, Bebenhausen Abbey flourished; by 1275, of all the Benedictine or Cistercian abbeys in the diocese of Constance, Bebenhausen paid the highest procuratio to its bishop to support him. The Bebenhausen chapter acquired pfleghofe (comparable to monastic granges) as far away as present-day Ludwigsburg and sold their produce in such cities as Stuttgart, Tübingen, Esslingen, and Ulm. Per the Rule of St. Benedict, land owned by the Order had to be worked by its lay brothers, of which there were up to 130 at Bebenhausen in the 13th century, with another 80 choir monks. From the 14th century however the number of lay brothers at Bebenhausen diminished sharply and by 1494, there were only 56 choir monks and 6 lay brothers. As a result, the monastery began leasing its land. At the same time, it was also gaining political and religious jurisdiction over nearby villages and churches and thus their revenues. The abbey's leadership was also becoming increasingly local going into the 15th century, and it was under local abbots, but especially Werner and then Peter von Gomaringen, that the most political, economic, and architectural growth took place. Peter von Gomaringen added, in spite of Cistercian rules, a stone ridge turret over the crossing of the church. He constructed another atop the summer refectory, a 14th-century addition by abbot Konrad von Lustnau.

In 1342, the County of Württemberg gained sovereignty over Bebenhausen and the surrounding Schönbuch. As the Schönbuch was a popular hunting ground, the Counts of Württemberg became frequent guests of the monastery from that date onward. Ties between Württemberg and Bebenhausen grew over the 15th century, despite the monastery having Imperial representation, and by 1480 its abbots joined the Estates of Württemberg, which was by then a Duchy.

=== Reformation ===
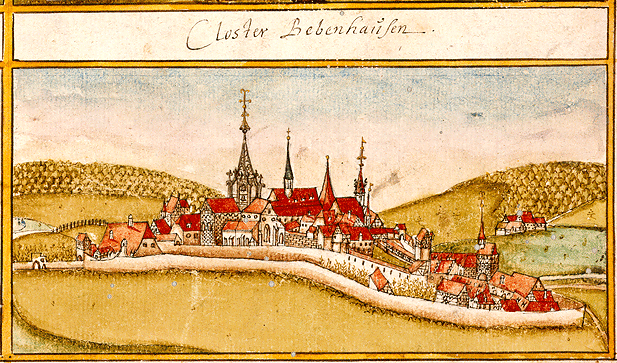
Bebenhausen in 1683, engraving by Andreas Kieser

Following the death of the last Catholic abbot of Bebenhausen on 21 December 1534, half of the 36 monks at the monastery professed the Lutheran faith. The next year, Ulrich, Duke of Württemberg, took over and dissolved the abbey, though the Cistercians would return and again be expelled in 1648. Ulrich gave the converted monks a pension of 40 guilders, while those who had remained Catholic were expelled without compensation. Most of the latter went to Salem Abbey or Stams Abbey in the Tyrol, while the former went to Tennenbach Abbey, which no longer had any monks. In 1537, Ulrich demolished the church's nave and recycled its masonry for Hohentübingen Castle.

Ulrich's son and successor, Christoph, issued a Church Order in 1559 that made education mandatory for every male inhabitant of the duchy. It also established Protestant seminaries in all 13 former Catholic monasteries within its borders. Discipline at these schools, where the speaking of German was forbidden in favor of Latin, was harsh and they were often not very well supplied with foodstuffs. In 1560, a boarding school was opened on the abbey's grounds. It operated until 1806. In 1650, Johannes Valentinus Andreae, who had in 1645 made Württemberg the first European state to extend compulsory education to every citizen, was appointed director of Bebenhausen's seminary.

=== Kingdom of Württemberg ===
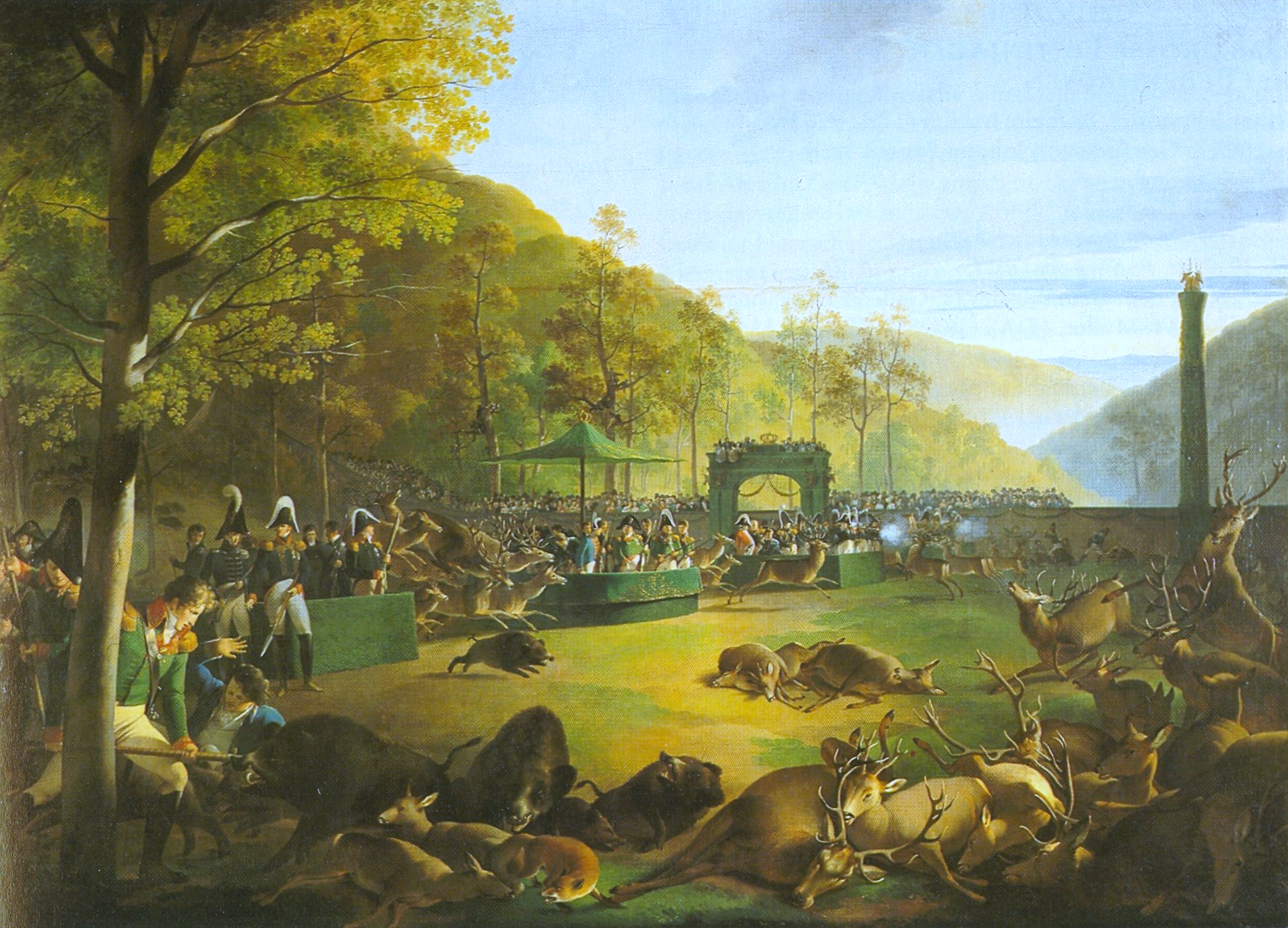
Johann Baptist Seele's 1813–14 landscape painting of the Festival of Diana, located at the Museum der Alltagskultur

After German mediatization, Bebenhausen was officially annexed in 1807 to the Kingdom of Württemberg. The kingdom's first king, Frederick I, turned the abbot's house into a hunting retreat. From that retreat, Frederick celebrated his 58th birthday and held several days of feasting and hunting, called the "Festival of Diana", beginning on 9 November 1812. Temporary structures were built around the monastery by court architect Nikolaus Friedrich von Thouret. Frederick's son and successor, William I, though he never resided at Bebenhausen, began extensively restoring the monastery in 1850. William's own son and heir, Charles I, spent his autumns at Bebenhausen, and tasked architect August Beyer with renovating the palace's rooms.

Württemberg's final monarchs, William II and Charlotte of Schaumburg-Lippe, were avid hunters and spent two weeks of every autumn at Bebenhausen. The couple entertained a large amount of guests at Bebenhausen, including Wilhelm II, the German Emperor, in 1893.

On 9 November 1918, revolutionaries occupied the Wilhelmspalais in Stuttgart. William II and Charlotte left the capital for Bebenhausen and there abdicated a few days later. The couple was allowed to remain at Bebenhausen for the duration of their lives. William II never returned to Stuttgart; when he died in 1921, he was laid to rest at Ludwigsburg Palace. Charlotte died at Bebenhausen in 1946, after spending the duration of World War II there.

=== Public property ===
Following the conclusion of World War II, Germany was divided into French, American, British, and Soviet zones of occupation. The French zone covered over half of Baden and some of Württemberg, areas further divided into South Baden and Württemberg-Hohenzollern. The French civilian government established itself in Baden-Baden, while their military headquarters was in Freudenstadt, not far from Württemberg-Hohenzollern's capital at Tübingen. To head Württemberg-Hohenzollern, the French ordered Carlo Schmid, a half-French lawyer who had greeted French forces at Tübingen, to form a civilian government. To this end, elections for an advisory board were held on 17 November 1946, and the 65 elected persons met at Bebenhausen Abbey on 17 November. After a constitutional referendum and a general election, both held on 18 May 1947, work began on a constitution for Württemberg-Hohenzollern. A total of 118 plenary sessions were held in the winter refectory from 3 June 1947 until the state of Baden-Württemberg was formed in 1952.

In early 1973, a proposal was made by the Baden-Württemberg Office for the Preservation of Monuments (LfD) to the town council of Bebenhausen to place the village under protection as an ensemble (Gesamtanlage) per the Baden-Württemberg Monument Protection Act of 1972. The town council met on 8 August 1973 and, on the advice of a representative of the LfD, agreed unanimously to the LfD's proposal and planning. The government of Baden-Württemberg officiated this protective status with the issuing of an ordinance on 27 January 1975.

The summer refectory was closed to visitors in January 2016 following the appearance of large cracks in its vaulting as a result in a fault in its eastern wall. Restoration work began immediately and was advised by a collection of experts assembled by Staatliche Schlösser und Gärten Baden-Württemberg (SSG), the cultural heritage management agency charged with the maintenance of state-owned edifices in Baden-Württemberg. This work was completed in April 2017. Later that year, and lasting into 2019, further work was undertaken at Bebenhausen Abbey to make it more accessible to disabled visitors.

As a consequence of the COVID-19 pandemic in Germany, SSG announced on 17 March 2020 the closure of all its monuments and cancellation of all events until 3 May. Monuments began reopening in early May, from 1 May to 17 May; Bebenhausen Abbey was reopened to visitors on 12 May and the Palace on 16 May. SSG again closed monuments on 24 October in response to rising COVID-19 infections.

== Monastery complex ==
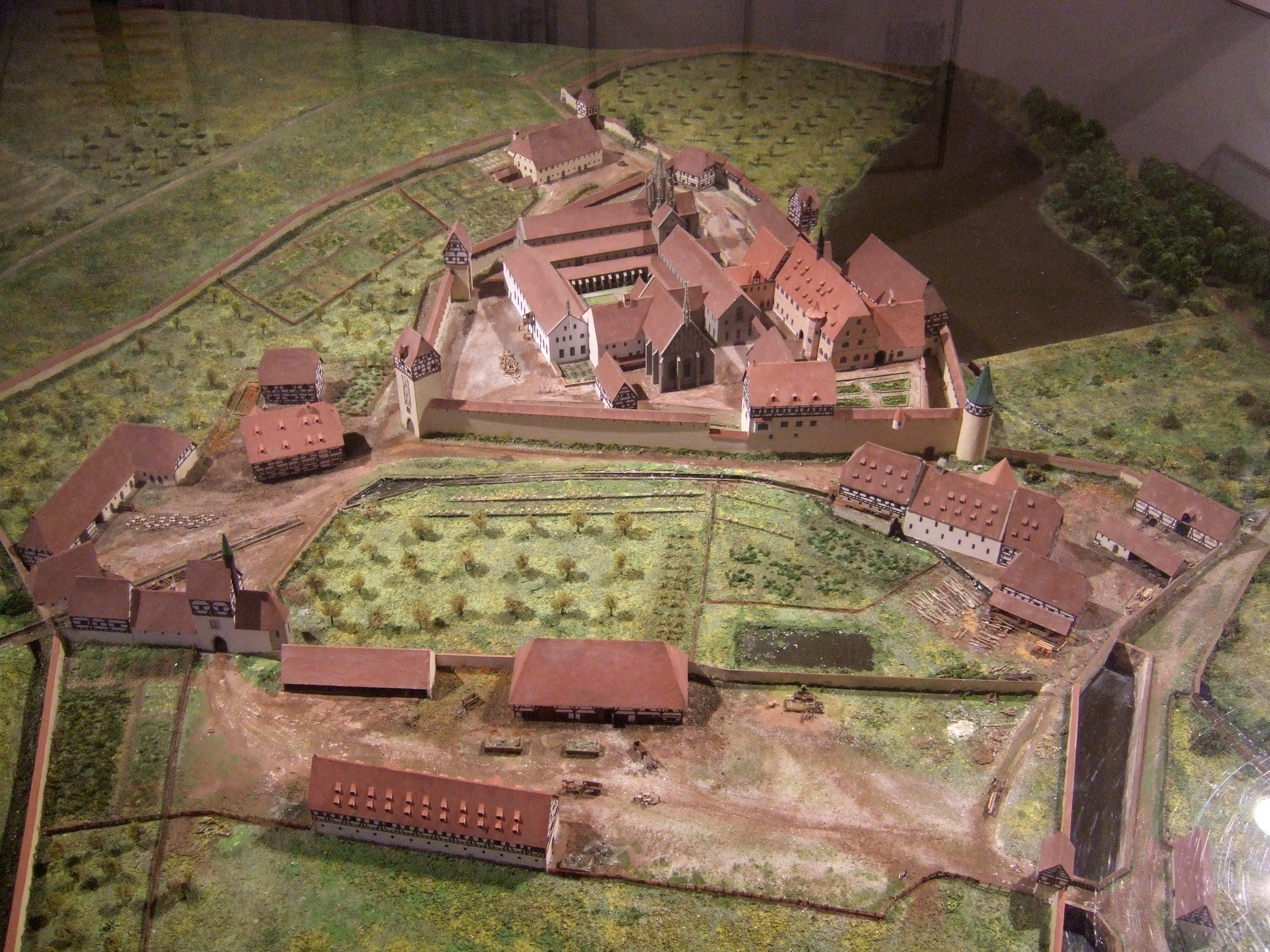
Model of the monastery complex in the abbey museum

The Bebenhausen monastery complex is situated upon a terrace above the Goldersbach river within the Schönbuch nature park. The existing buildings of the monastery were built from 1475 and 1500 upon older structures. They are defended by a 13th-century wall, two towers, inner bailey, and a 15th-century gatehouse, the Writing Tower, found at the complex's southwest end. The southeastern complex of buildings, constituted by the guest house, hospital, abbot's kitchen, and a courtyard, were transformed by Charles I into Bebenhausen Palace. Charles I had the rooms of the palace renovated in the Gothic and Renaissance Revival styles by August Beyer and furnished with items from the royal collection. William II and Charlotte made further alterations to the palace from 1891 to 1918 and extensively modernized it. To the north of the royal retreat are the abbey's barns. To the south is the abbot's house, once connected to the rest of the monastery by a bridge.

Per their code, most of the abbey built by the Cistercians is austere in design. Some early Gothic architecture, imported from Burgundy in the 13th century, is found in the chapter house, parlatorium, and brother's hall. In 1335, the high Gothic Summer Refectory was built. As the abbey grew in prosperity in the 15th century, it added additional Gothic buildings such as the Rhenish vaulting of the cloister.

=== Monastery ===
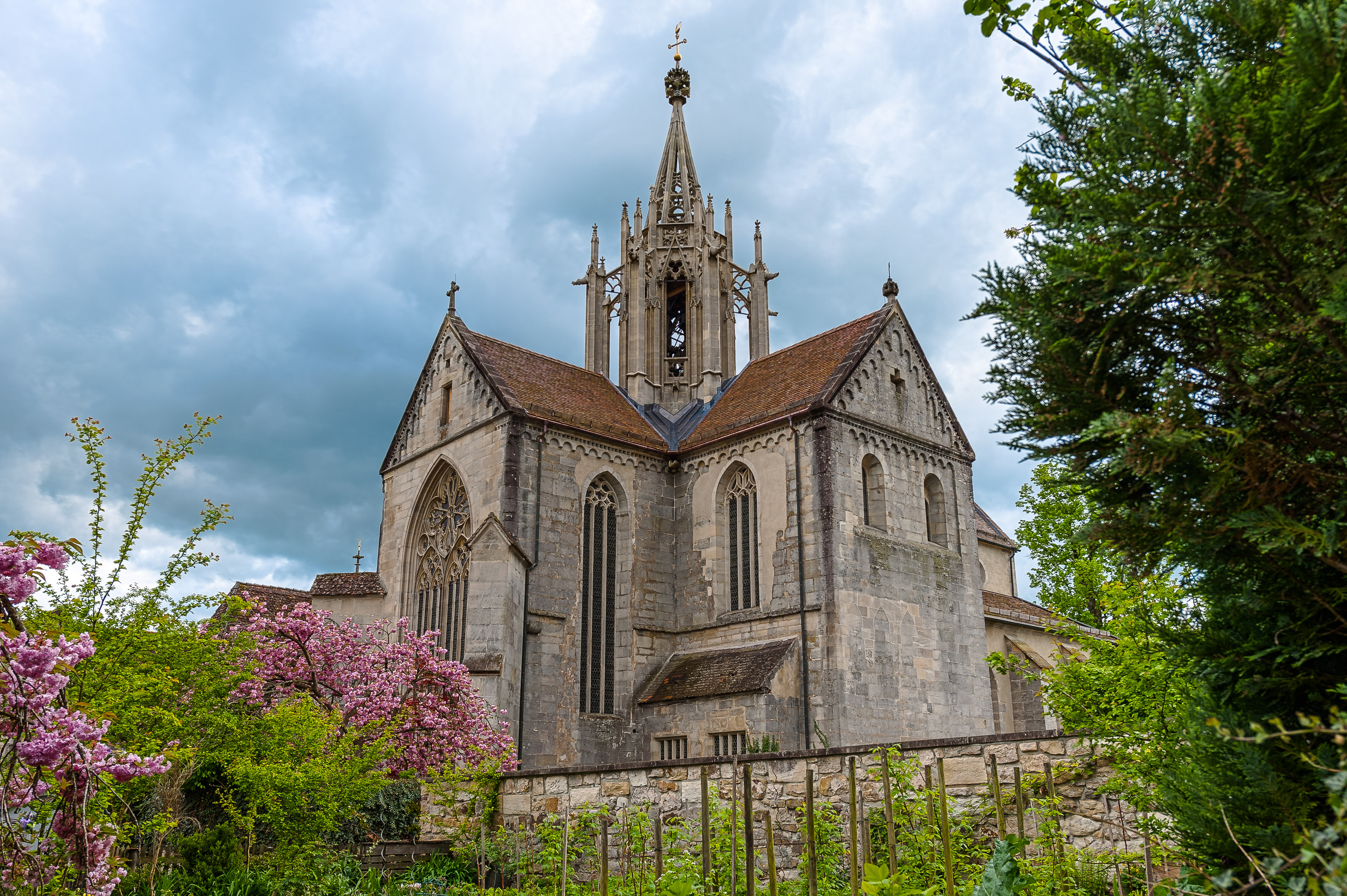
The Church of St. Mary from the northeast

Construction of the church began in the late 12th century, but was completed relatively quickly and then consecrated in 1228. Its design is typical for Cistercian churches, being a cruciform basilica with three aisles and a flat roof. From 1335 to 1340, the church was renovated in the Gothic style; the choir windows were added, as was a new altar in the northern transept that is no longer extant. More changes were made to the church in the 16th century, when the roof was replaced with star and net vaults, and 19 opulent alters were installed. Duke Charles Eugene removed most of the glazing of the choir windows to Hohenheim Palace in 1781. The church presently contains and displays later Renaissance and Baroque paintings, epitaphs, and tombs. The organ and galleries were added to the church in the 19th century.

The ridge turret on top of the abbey church, ornate and made of stone, violated the code of the Cistercians, which mandated a simple spire made of wood. The turret was constructed between the years 1407 and 1409 by a Cistercian monk called Brother George from Salem Abbey.

The chapter house was, after the church, the second most important space in the abbey during its monastic operation. The building, built from 1217 to 1228, is square-shaped and divided into three rows of bays. The ceilings were painted in 1528 with images of flowers and the instruments of the Passion. Restorations of these paintings were undertaken under King Charles I. Inside is a small chapel, dedicated to John the Apostle in 1224, and seven tomb slabs. Among them are the tombs of Rudolph I, Count Palatine of Tübingen and his wife. Rudolph's tomb, adjacent to the chapel's entrance, has been opened many times since 1219 and its lid is presently at rest upside-down.

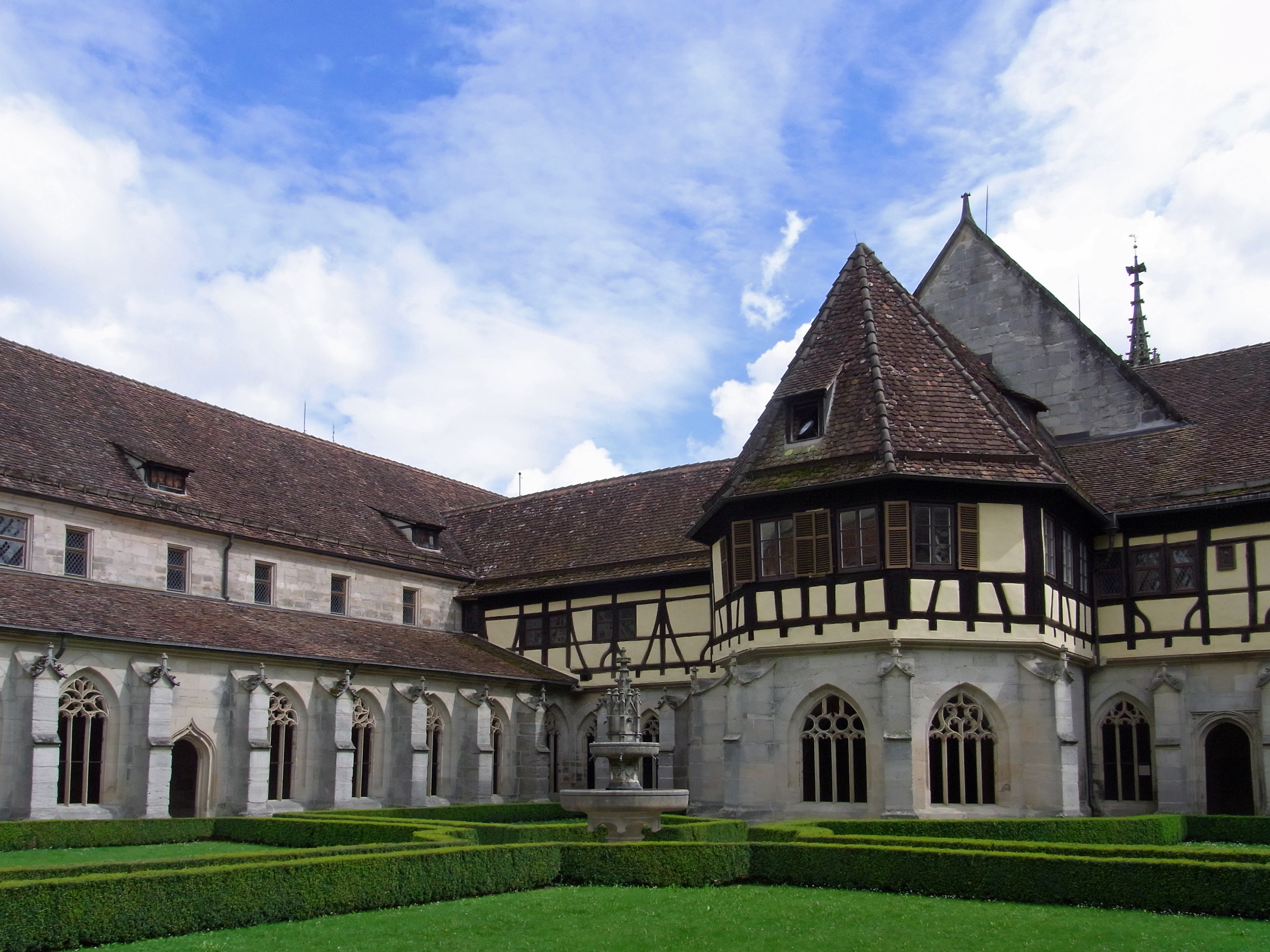
The lavatorium seen from the cloister garden

The cloister was first completed in the last years of the 13th century, but then underwent major renovation in the 15th century. This work lasted into the next century. In the operation of the abbey, each side of the cloister had a specific function. The north side, next to the church, was used for evening liturgy; the east wing was where the lay brothers listened to the meetings of the brother monks; the south side was the entrance to the lavatorium; the west side was the route the lay brothers took into the abbey church. The fountains of the lavatorium no longer exists, but its Gothic star vaulting remains. The cloister garden is divided into four sections of grass by a cruciform white gravel path lined with hedges. At its center is a 19th-century fountain, replacing a medieval well.

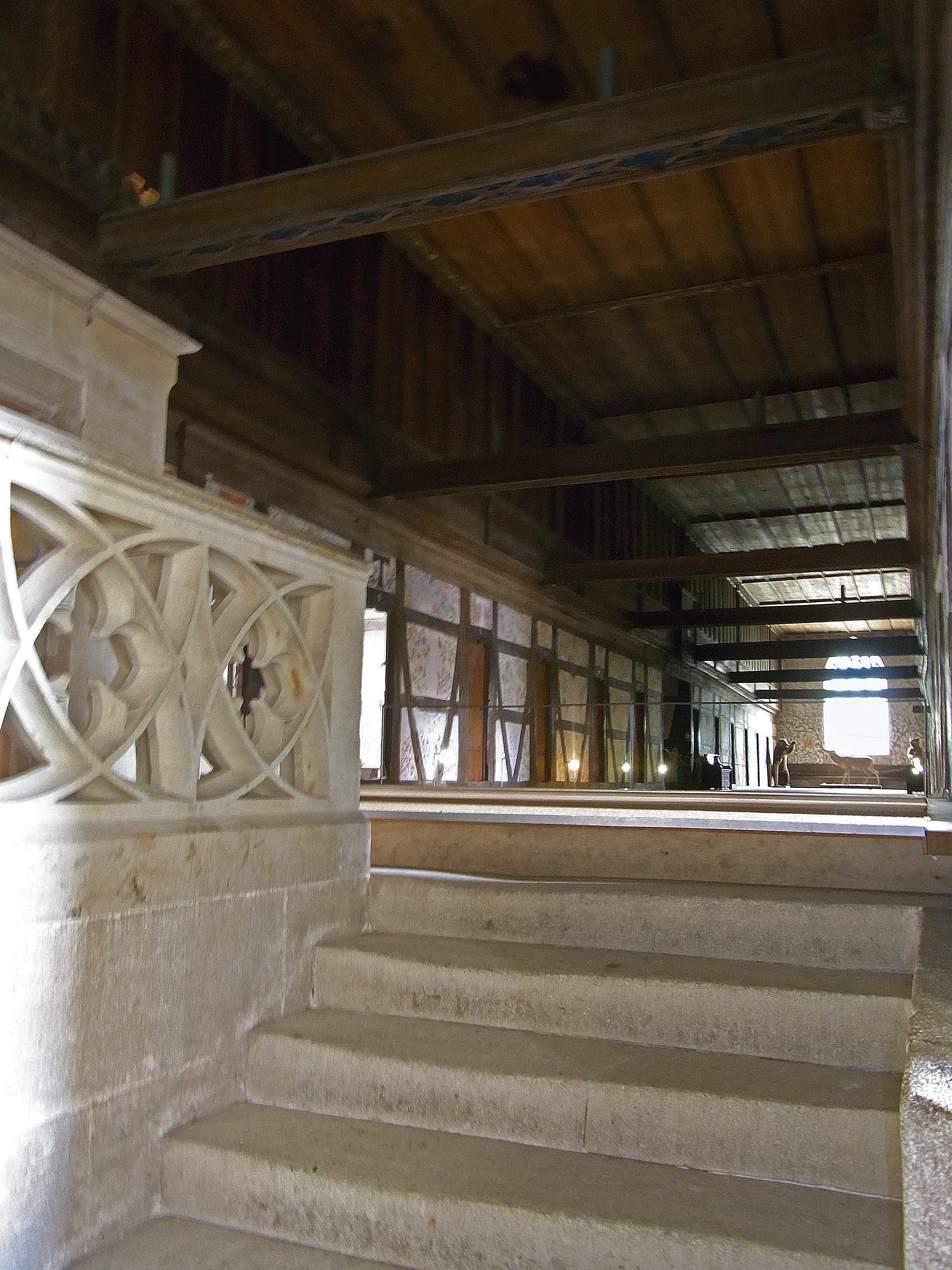
Stairs up to the monks' sleeping quarters; at the end of the hall is Lustnau's Gothic window

In accordance with Cistercian doctrine, the east and west sides of the monastery are made up by the monks and lay brothers' dormitories respectively. Sleeping quarters in either building were on the second floor. As completed in 1216–17, the monks' dormitory was a large hall with tiled floors and barrel vaulted ceiling. In the 14th century, abbot Lustnau added the Gothic window at the south end of the hall. His successor, Fridingen, converted the dormitory into cells for the monks and replaced the original ceiling with a flat one. The murals of flowers and inscriptions were painted in 1523 and restored in the early 20th century. When Bebenhausen Monastery became a hunting retreat, the monks' dorms were again remodeled to accommodate guests. In the 1940s, they also housed members of Württemberg-Hohenzollern's parliament and accordingly received modern bathrooms.

The summer refectory was built in 1335 on the foundations of a previous refectory destroyed by fire. The refectory was restored in 1873 by Charles I in the Gothic Revival style. The hall, floored with glazed tiles, is furnished with Gothic wood paneling and bench all along the walls. Three narrow and octagonal pillars hold up more star vaults, which are covered with medieval frescoes. Outside, further support is provided by a series of buttresses. A miniature of the church's steeple crowns the summer refectory's roof. When Bebenhausen was a royal residence, the summer refectory also contained suits of plate armor and trophies of arms. On display inside the summer refectory are gold and silver tableware produced by the Schleissner silversmith company between 1870 and 1875. The pieces, some of the oldest known examples of Schleissner work, were originally on display in the Blue Hall.

The winter refectory was the lay brothers' dining hall, modified under the final Catholic abbot of the monastery with heated floors. This hall is also furnished according to the Gothic Revival style, and still contains its 19th century dining table and chairs. The walls are painted with coats of arms, vines, and images of hunting, and with a mural depicting the acts of the Knights of Calatrava, a Spanish religious military order. A wooden barrel vault forms the hall's ceiling.

=== Palace ===
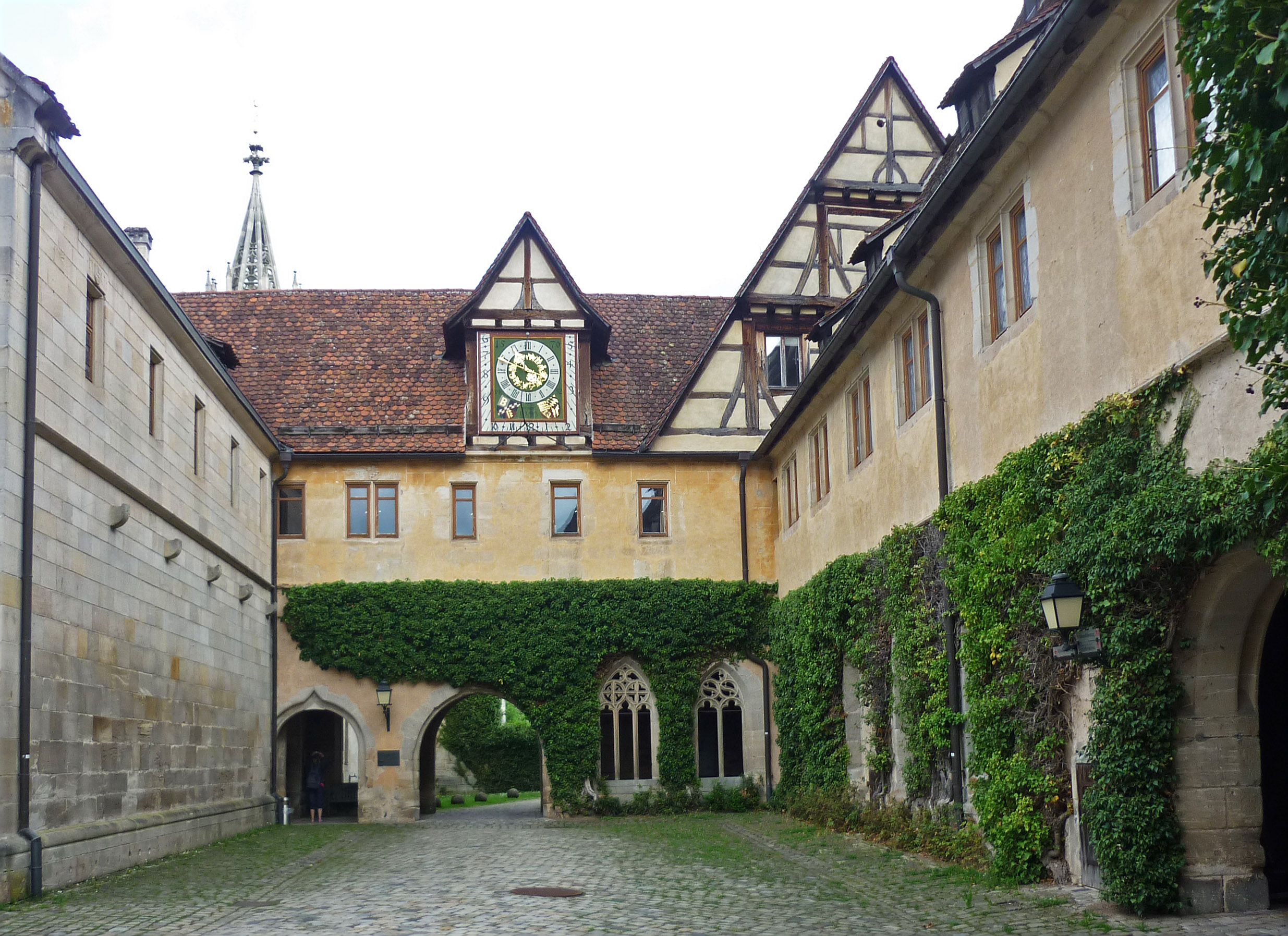
The bridge from Bebenhausen Palace (right) to the monks' dormitory (left), pictured from the south

Bebenhausen Palace's two halls, the Blue and Green Halls, were created for receptions and banquets out of the monastery's guesthouse and the abbot's kitchen respectively. The guesthouse was transformed into the Blue Hall in 1870 and was furnished by King Charles I with hunting trophies, a replica chandelier and dining set copied from a manor in Ulm. Additional inventory includes pieces of Charles Eugene's majolica collection and the sword of the first Duke of Württemberg.

Queen Charlotte's apartment was previously that of Charles I. The suite was renovated for her in 1915–16 into the present arrangement of antechamber, bedroom, dressing room, bathroom, drawing room, and music room. All are clad in Art Nouveau wallpapers. Charlotte's antechamber is adorned with hunting trophies, some bearing her monogram, acquired between 1899 and 1917. Her drawing room is lined with Renaissance wood paneling and contains six 17th and 18th century Dutch paintings. On the west wall is an additional painting, by Julius Mössel, of Náchod Castle, where Charlotte grew up. The drawing room and bathroom were thoroughly modernized in 1915–16 and are comparatively plain.

Above the former abbot's kitchen is William II's apartment, produced from 1868 to 1870 in an enfilade, in the Gothic and Renaissance Revival styles. Of the four rooms of his apartment, William II only occupied two of them. Further expansion of the suite was planned after the completion of Charlotte's suite, but was cancelled in 1918.

On the ground floor of the Kapff building is the palace kitchen, which was massively expanded in 1913 from its original 26 meters (85 ft) and refurnished three years later. During the palace's operation as a residence, the kitchen would have been staffed by the Stuttgart kitchen and confectionery staff. Above the kitchen is the Green Hall, an addition made by William II in 1915–16 to replace a guest suite occupied by Charles Woodcock, Charles I's lover. The hall is connected to the kitchen by a narrow iron staircase, which was used by waitstaff to bring food up to the Green Hall.

== See also ==
- List of Cistercian monasteries
- Maulbronn Abbey
- Heiligkreuztal Monastery
