= Charles-Léon de Servins d'Héricourt =

Charles-Léon de Servins, 6th Marquis d'Héricourt (7 January 1843 – 10 June 1911), until 1896 Comte d'Héricourt, was a French aristocrat and diplomat.

== Early life ==
Héricourt was born on 7 January 1843 in Arras, in Nord-Pas-de-Calais. He was a son of Count Achmet-Marie de Servins d'Héricourt (1819–1871) and Valentine-Josephine d'Oresmieulx de Fouquières (1816–1881). His father was an archaeologist and bibliophile who served as mayor of Souchez. His mother died at the Château du Carieul in 1881.

His paternal grandparents were Charles François Joseph de Servins d'Héricourt and Alexandrine Therese Louise de Bucy. His maternal grandparents were Augustin d'Oresmieulx de Fouquières, Lord of Fouquières, and Charlotte Alexandrine de Beaulaincourt de Marles. His grandfather's grandfather, Louis-François-Joseph de Servin, a former captain of Grenadiers in the Dauphin Regiment was Knighted in June 1760 (he was already a Knight of Saint Louis by that point), Maréchal de camp in 1766, and was created the 1st Marquis of Héricourt in August 1779 by King Louis XVI.

== Career ==
Héricourt served as French Consul in Stuttgart in 1880, then Leipzig, before becoming Consul general of France and retiring as Minister Plenipotentiary.

Upon the death of his first cousin Jules de Servin, Marquis d'Héricourt on 29 February 1896, he succeeded as the 6th Marquis of Héricourt (French: Marquis d'Héricourt). Before this, he was known as Count of Héricourt (French: Comte d'Héricourt). He was the proprietor of the Château d'Héricourt, in Héricourt near Saint-Pol (Pas-de-Calais).

He was made a Commander of the Order of St. Olav, an Honorary Knight of the Order of the Crown of Württemberg.

== Personal life ==
On 23 June 1884, Héricourt Baroness Olga Hugo von Spitzemberg (1863–1955) in Stuttgart. Olga was a daughter of Baron Wilhelm von Spitzemberg, a Württemberg General and Grande Chamberlain and aide-de-camp to King Charles I, and Baroness Marie Hugo von Herman auf Wain. Among her siblings were Amélie (the Baroness Franz von Soden) and Elisabeth (the Baroness Volkart von Ow-Wachendorf). Together, they were the parents of:

- Marie-Joséphine de Servins d'Héricourt (1885–1958), a nun with the Daughters of Charity of Saint Vincent de Paul.
- Olga-Marie de Servins d'Héricourt (1888–1978), who married Jean-Paul-Marie-Augustin, Viscount of Masin (French: Vicomte de Masin) of the Château de Brandon.
- Yvonne de Servins d'Héricourt (1891–1916), a Red Cross nurse who was accidentally poisoned and died during World War I.
- Jean de Servins d'Héricourt, 7th Marquis d'Héricourt (1896–1917), a Second Lieutenant Aviator who died during World War I.

Héricourt died at 13 Rue Colbert, his home in Versailles, on 10 June 1911. After the death of his son in 1917, the marquessate became extinct.
