= Order of Olga =

Order of Olga Olga-Orden
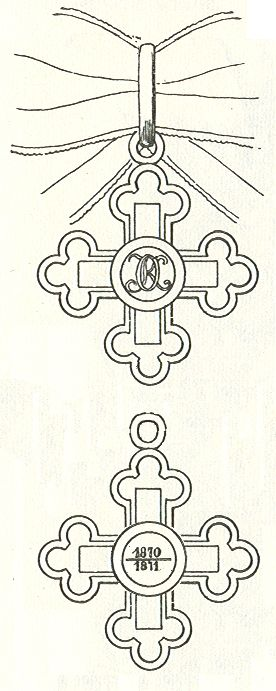
- Insignia of the Order of Olga (obverse and reverse)

Awarded by The Kingdom of Württemberg
- Type: Chivalric order in one class
- Established: 27 June 1871
- Status: Disestablished
- Grades: Member
- Order of Olga ribbon

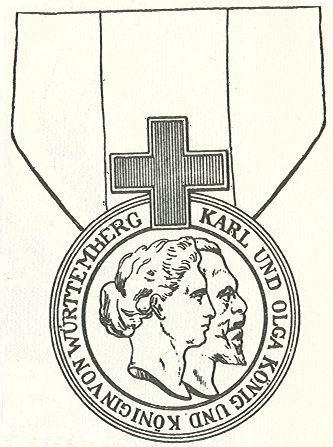
Karl-Olga Medal

The Order of Olga (Württemberg) (German: Olga-Orden) was created by Karl I, King of Württemberg, on 27 June 1871, to honor his queen consort, Grand Duchess Olga Nikolaevna of Russia. Its primary purpose was to honor women who cared for wounded soldiers in the Franco-Prussian War of 1870 – 1871. While it was conferred on a few men, it remained largely a women's order.

The insignia was a cross of silver with the interlocking cipher of the King Karl and Queen Olga on the obverse and the years 1870-71 on the reverse. This emblem was suspended from a red and black ribbon. Men, including the king, wore it from the buttonhole of his coat or as a military medal, while ladies wore it suspended form a large bow on their left breast.

In 1889, a similar medal was created – the Karl Olga Medal – for service to the Red Cross. This decoration was, incidentally, also given primarily to women, but was not part of the Order of Olga.

== Sources ==
- Tagore, Rajah Sir Sourindro Mohun. The Orders of Knighthood, British and Foreign. Calcutta, India: The Catholic Orphan Press, 1884
- Maximilian Gritzner, Handbuch der Ritter- und Verdienstorden aller Kulturstaaten der Welt innerhalb des XIX. Jahrhunderts. Auf Grund amtlicher und anderer zuverlässiger Quellen zusammengestellt, Verlag: Leipzig: Verlagsbuchhandlung von J. J. Weber, 1893
- Jörg Nimmergut, Deutschland-Katalog, 2002
