= Héricourt, Pas-de-Calais =

Héricourt
- Commune
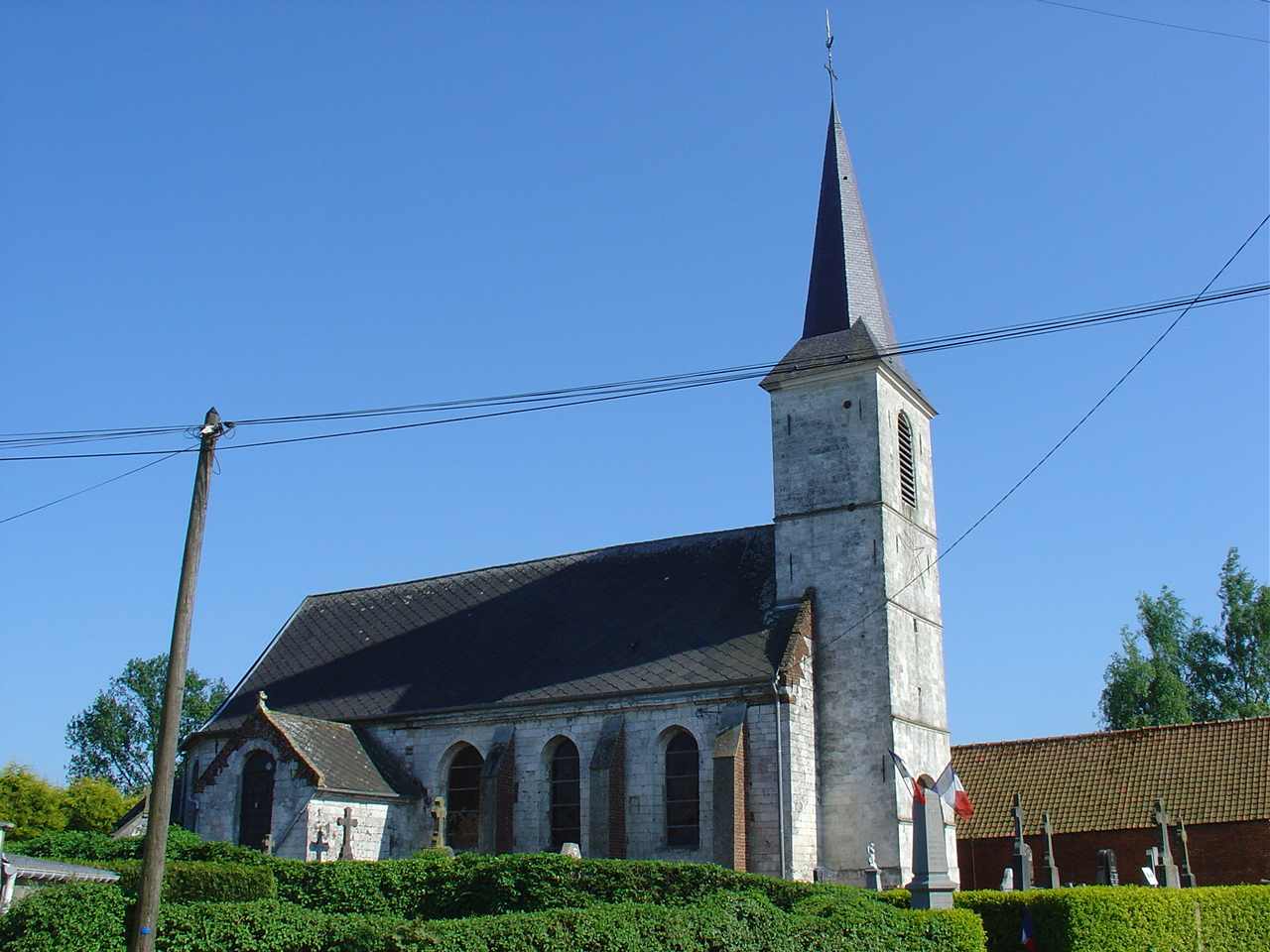
- The church of Héricourt

- Coat of arms
- Location of Héricourt
- Location within France Location within Hauts-de-France
- Coordinates: 50°20′46″N 2°15′18″E
- Country: France
- Region: Hauts-de-France
- Department: Pas-de-Calais
- Arrondissement: Arras
- Canton: Saint-Pol-sur-Ternoise
- Intercommunality: CC Ternois

Government
  - Mayor (2020–2026): Mickaël Poillion
- Area^{1}: 4.95 km^{2} (1.91 sq mi)
- Elevation: 140 m (460 ft)
- Highest elevation: 147 m (482 ft)
- Lowest elevation: 99 m (325 ft)
- Population (2023): 77
  - Density: 16/km^{2} (40/sq mi)
- Time zone: UTC+01:00 (CET)
  - Summer (DST): UTC+02:00 (CEST)
- INSEE/Postal code: 62433 /62130
- ^{1} French Land Register data, which excludes lakes, ponds, glaciers > 1 km^{2} (0.386 sq mi or 247 acres) and river estuaries.

Héricourt (French pronunciation: [eʁikuʁ]) is a commune in the Pas-de-Calais department in the Hauts-de-France region of France 28 miles (45 km) west of Arras.

== Population ==
Historical population
Year	Pop.	±% p.a.
1968	100	—
1975	85	−2.29%
1982	102	+2.64%
1990	100	−0.25%
1999	98	−0.22%
2007	100	+0.25%
2012	106	+1.17%
2017	95	−2.17%
2023	77	−3.44%
Source: INSEE

== Notable residents ==
- Charles-Lèon de Servins d'Héricourt, marquis d'Héricourt

== See also ==
- Communes of the Pas-de-Calais department
