= Bebenhausen =

Village in Tübingen, Baden-Württemberg, Germany

Coordinates: 48°33′35″N 9°03′36″E

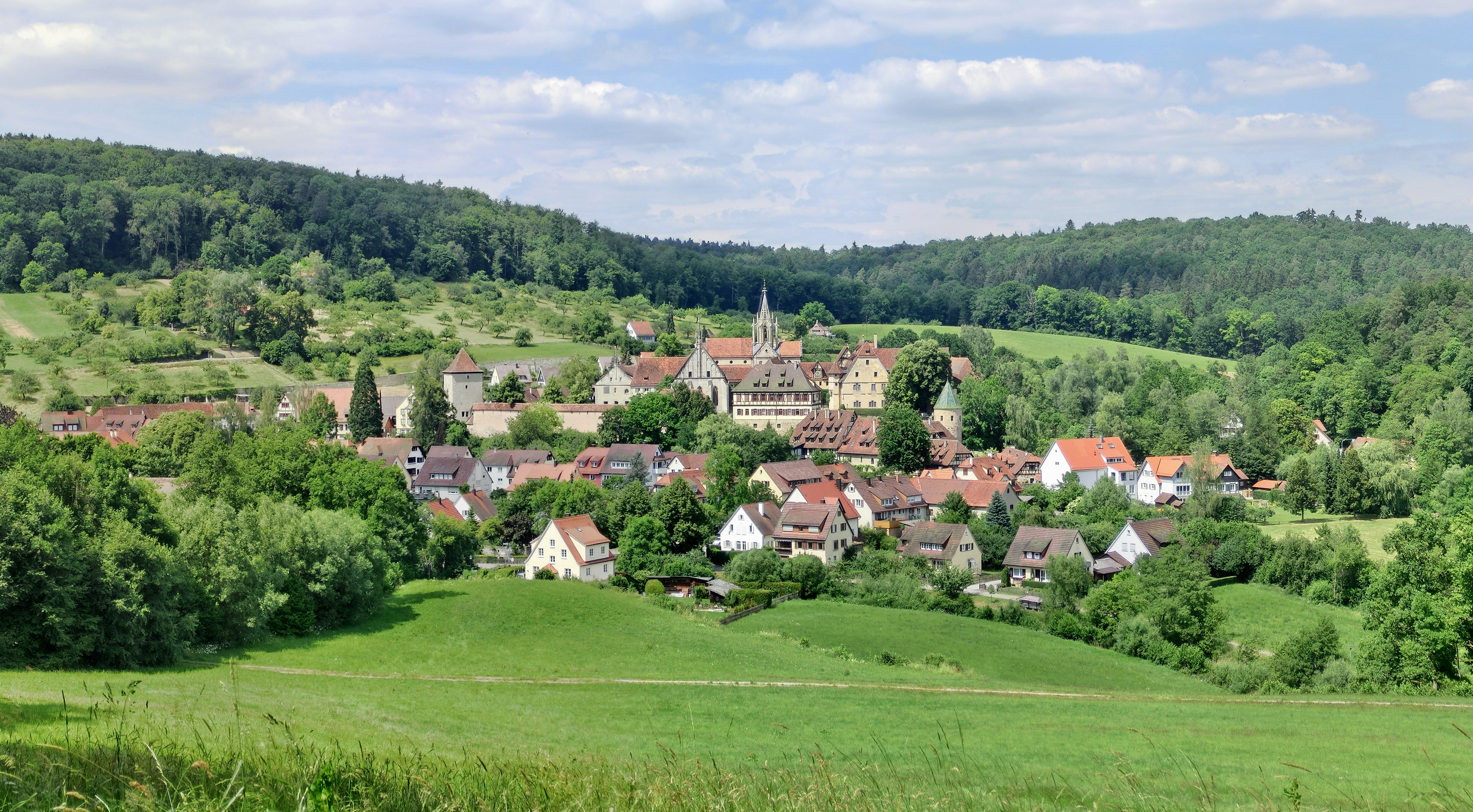
Bebenhausen

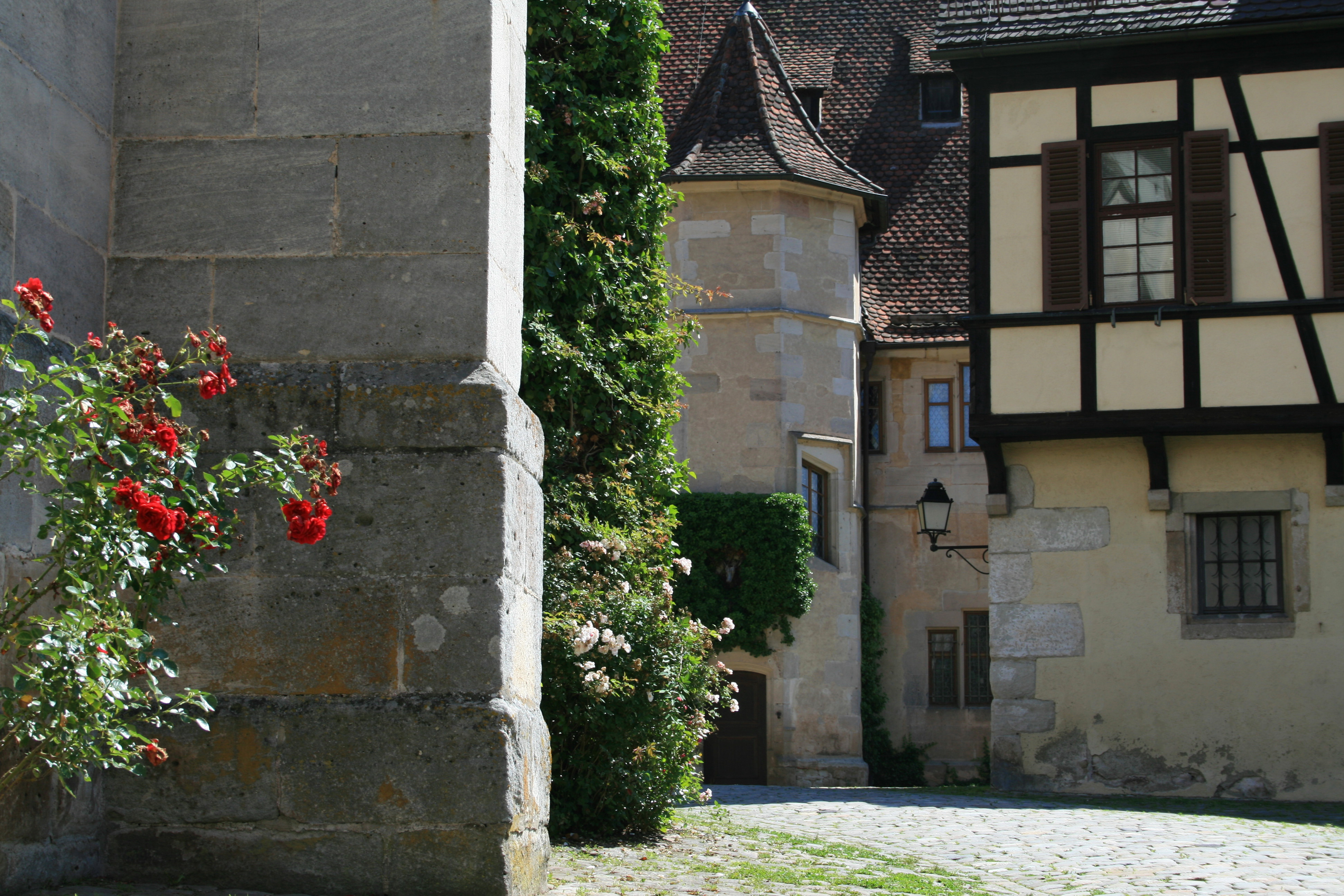
Bebenhausen

Bebenhausen (German pronunciation: [ˌbeːbn̩ˈhaʊzn̩]) is a village (pop. 347) in the Tübingen district, Baden-Württemberg, Germany. Since 1974 it is a district of the city of Tübingen, its least populous one. It is located 3 km north of Tübingen proper (about 5 km northeast of the city centre), in the southeastern part of the protected landscape of the Schönbuch, a dense forest. Bebenhausen is famous for its monastery, Bebenhausen Abbey, founded in 1183 by Count Palatine Rudolph of Tübingen.

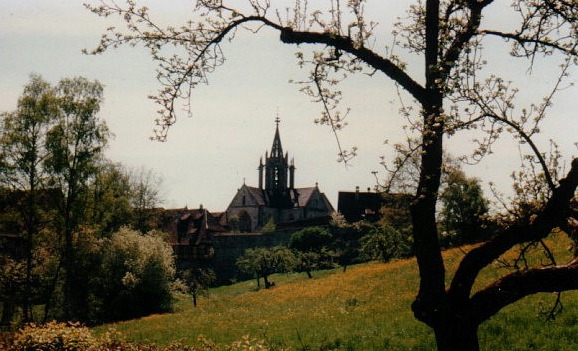
Cistercian church at Bebenhausen

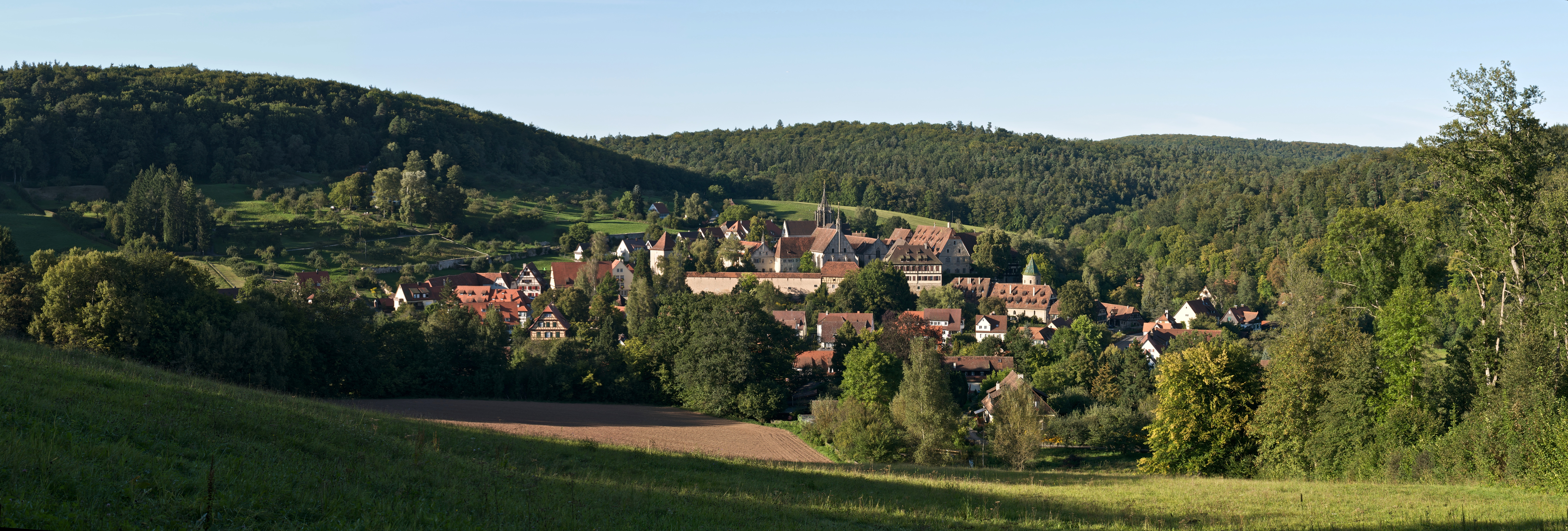
Bebenhausen from the South

In the early 19th century the monastery became a hunting palace for the kings of Württemberg. King William II of Württemberg lived there until his death in 1921, and his wife Princess Charlotte of Schaumburg-Lippe lived there until her death in 1946. It became the seat of Württemberg-Hohenzollern from 1947 and until 1952 when Baden-Württemberg was created. In 1974, Bebenhausen became a district of Tübingen.
