= Olga Nikolaevna of Russia =

Queen of Württemberg from 1864 to 1891

Olga Nikolaevna
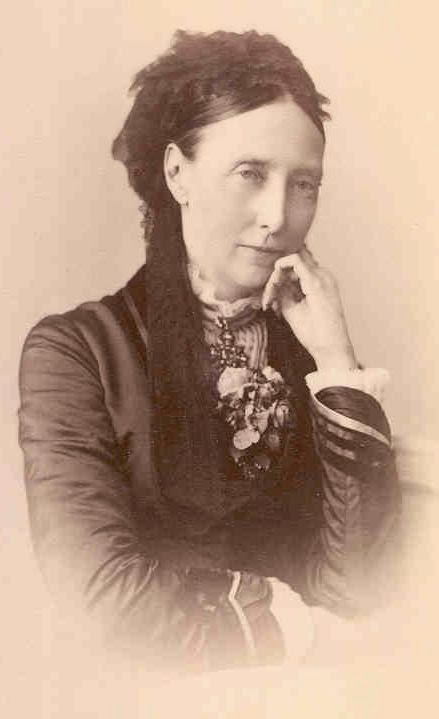
- Olga c. 1890

Queen consort of Württemberg
- Tenure: 25 June 1864 – 6 October 1891
- Born: 11 September 1822; St. Petersburg, Russia
- Died: 30 October 1892 (aged 70); Friedrichshafen, Kingdom of Württemberg, Germany
- Burial: 4 November 1892; Schlosskirche, Stuttgart
- Spouse: Charles I of Württemberg (m. 1846; died 1891)
- House: Holstein-Gottorp-Romanov
- Father: Nicholas I of Russia
- Mother: Charlotte of Prussia

Olga Nikolaevna of Russia (Russian: Ольга Николаевна; 11 September 1822 – 30 October 1892) was Queen of Württemberg from 25 June 1864 until 6 October 1891 as the wife of King Charles I of Württemberg.

Olga was the second daughter of Nicholas I of Russia and Charlotte of Prussia. She was thus a sister of Alexander II of Russia. She married the future Charles I of Württemberg in 1846. The marriage was childless.

She became Queen of Württemberg upon her husband's accession to the throne in 1864. Noted for her dignity and queenly demeanor, Queen Olga was particularly known in the public eye for her social commitment in the form of supporting institutions for the sick and disabled. To this day, numerous social and medical institutions in Stuttgart and the surrounding area bear her name.

== Early life ==
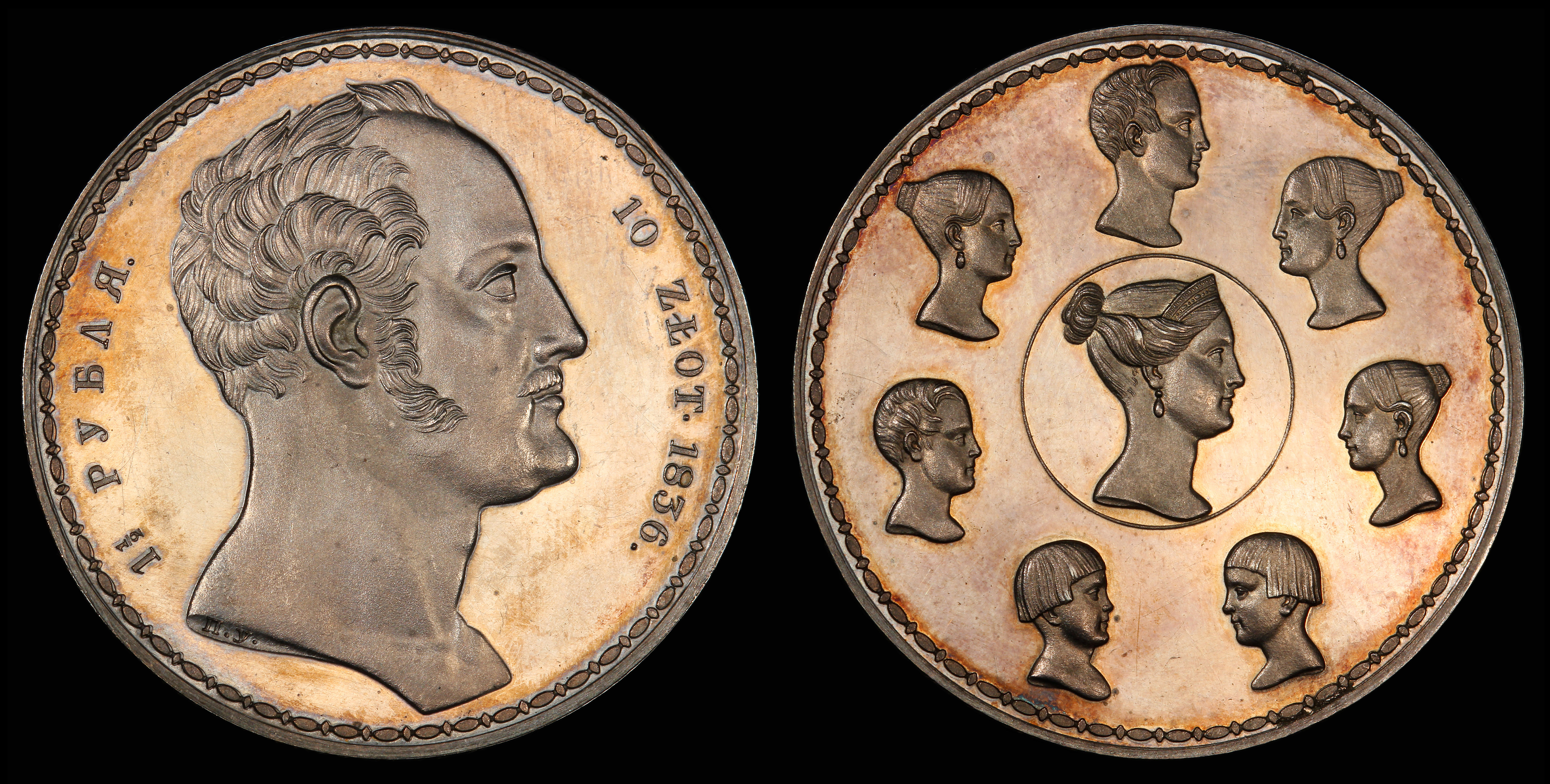
Nicholas I "Family Ruble" (1836) depicting the Tsar on the obverse and his family on the reverse: Tsarina Alexandra Feodorovna (center) surrounded by Alexander II as Tsarevich, Maria, Olga, Nicholas, Michael, Konstantin, and Alexandra

Grand Duchess Olga Nikolaevna of Russia was born on 11 September 1822 at the Anichkov Palace in St. Petersburg, Russia. Her father was Emperor Nicholas I of Russia, the son of Emperor Paul I of Russia and Empress Maria Feodorovna, who was born Duchess Sophie Dorothea of Württemberg. Olga's mother was Empress Alexandra Feodorovna, the daughter of King Frederick William III of Prussia and Queen Louise.

Known as "Olly" within her family, Olga grew up as part of a close family of seven children. She had two elder siblings: Emperor Alexander II of Russia and Grand Duchess Maria; and four younger siblings: Grand Duchess Alexandra, Grand Duke Constantine, Grand Duke Nicholas and Grand Duke Michael.

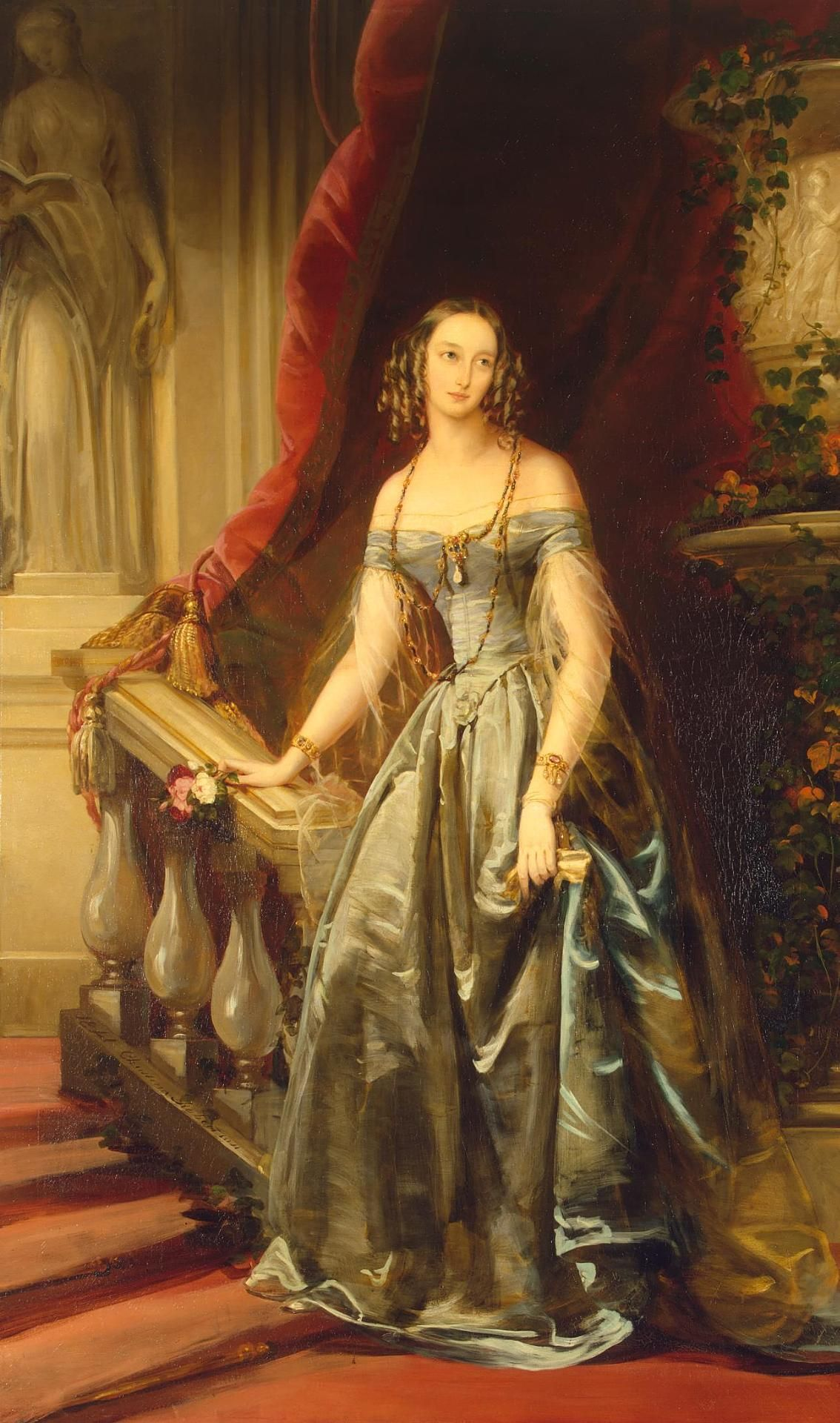
Grand Duchess Olga Nikolaevna of Russia. Portrait by Christina Robertson, 1841.

From the age of seven, the Grand Duchess studied humanities and music under the supervision of a British governess. As a mentor she also had the Russian poet and founder of Romanticism in Russian poetry, Vasily Zhukovsky. Attractive, cultured and intelligent, she was considered to be one of the most eligible princesses in Europe. She spoke several languages, and was fond of music and painting.

== Marriage ==
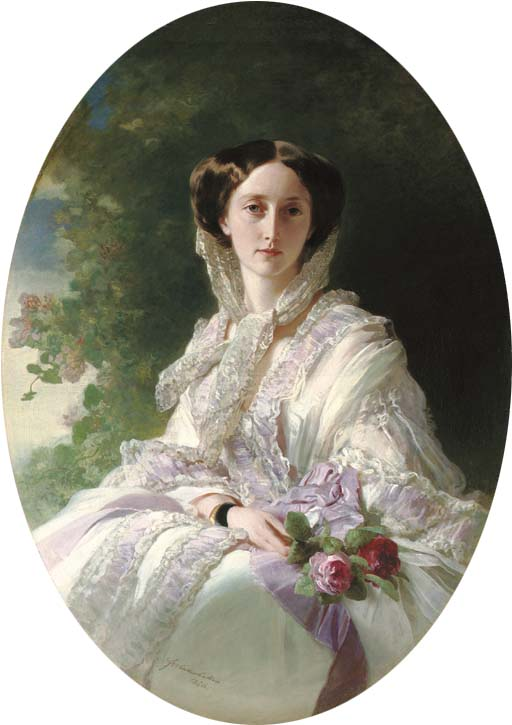
Crown Princess Olga. Portrait by Franz Xaver Winterhalter, 1856.

Her parents wished that she make a dynastic marriage, especially since her siblings Alexander, Maria and Alexandra had married relatively insignificant royal partners. After several tentative marriage projects failed to materialize, Olga met Crown Prince Charles of Württemberg in early 1846 in Palermo, Two Sicilies. There had already been several marriages between members of the Russian imperial family and members of the Württemberg royal family (in addition to the marriage between Olga's paternal grandparents): Olga's future father-in-law, King William I of Württemberg, married Olga's paternal aunt, Grand Duchess Catherine Pavlovna; Olga's paternal uncle, Grand Duke Michael, married William I's niece, Princess Charlotte of Württemberg.

Olga gave her consent to Charles's proposal of marriage after only a few meetings, on 18 January. The wedding was held in great splendour on 13 July 1846 at the Peterhof Palace, Russia. On 23 September, they held their official entry into the Kingdom of Württemberg's capital Stuttgart to great cheers from the population. They lived mostly in the Villa Berg in Stuttgart and in the Kloster Hofen in Friedrichshafen.

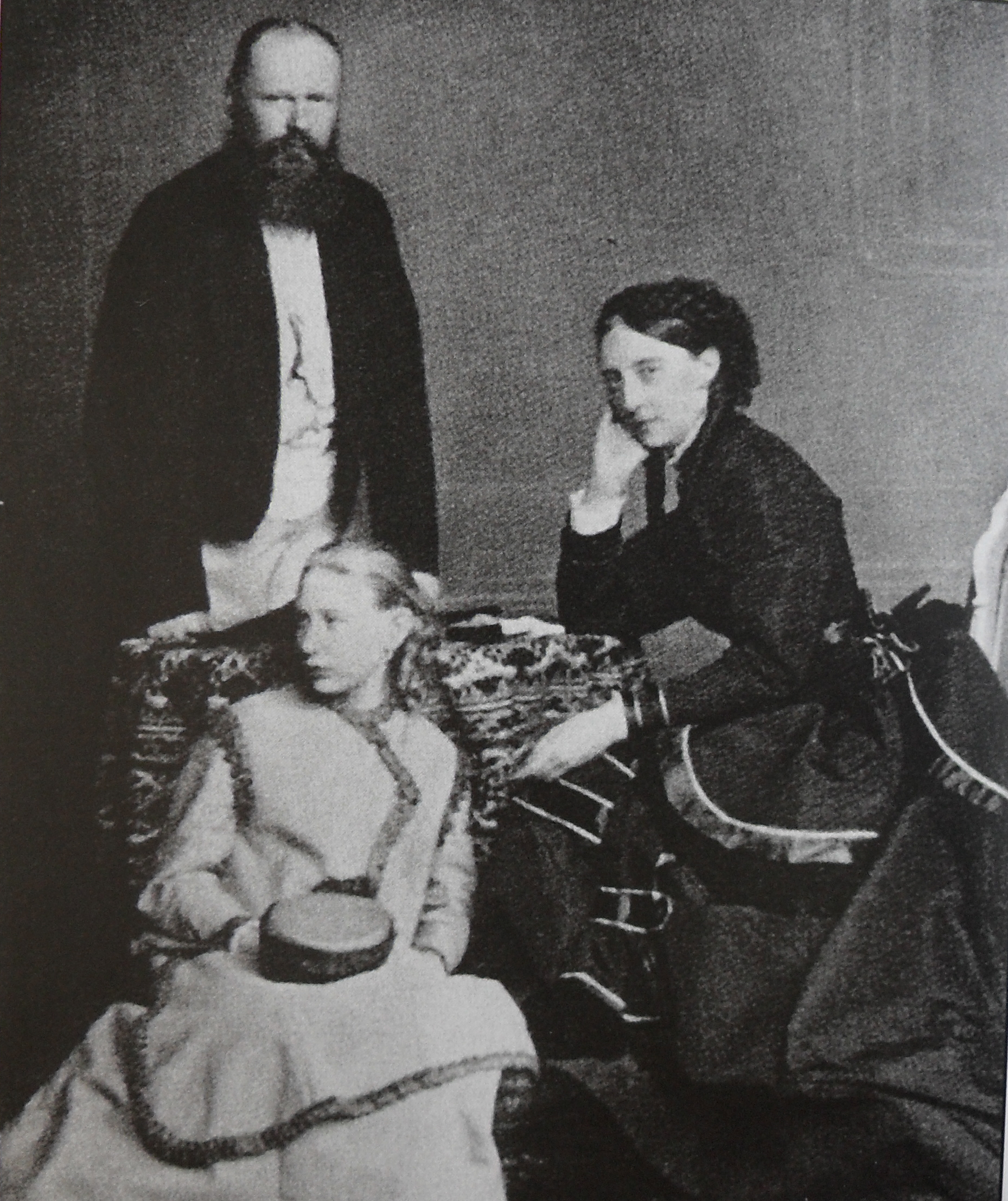
King Charles I of Württemberg and Queen Olga with their foster daughter, Grand Duchess Vera Constantinovna of Russia

The couple had no children, probably not because of Charles's homosexuality, which he lived openly in his later age, but of his other health problems. Olga's husband became the object of scandal several times for his closeness with various men. The most notorious of these was Charles Woodcock from the United States, a former chamberlain whom Charles elevated to being Freiherr Woodcock-Savage (English: Baron Woodcock-Savage) in 1888. The resulting outcry forced Charles to renounce his favourite. In 1863, Olga and Charles adopted Olga's niece, Grand Duchess Vera of Russia, the daughter of Olga's brother Grand Duke Constantine.

On 25 June 1864, after the death of his father, Charles acceded the throne and became the third King of Württemberg, making Olga the fourth Queen of Württemberg. The new king was enthroned on 12 July 1864.

== Work and influence ==
Supported by her cabinet secretary Boris von Wolff-Stomersee, Olga dedicated her life to social causes. She was especially interested in the education of girls, and also supported wounded veterans and the disabled assisted in part by philanthropist Charlotte Wahl of Stuttgart. A children's hospital of Stuttgart, the Olgahospital, was named for her in 1849; and an order of Protestant nursing nuns of Stuttgart, the Olgaschwesternschaft, was named for her in 1872. These charitable enterprises made her very popular among her subjects, much more so than her husband.

Olga was fond of agriculture and was keenly interested in all happenings on her farming estate which was located in the German Volhynia colony of Russia. She received detailed reports from her ward Karl Alexander Wieler, a Württemberg orphan, who managed her estate and would rise to prominence in Russia's Imperial government owing to this Imperial association.

Olga was also very interested in natural science and collected minerals systematically. Her collection was left to the Staatliche Museum für Naturkunde in Stuttgart. As of 2011 part of the collection is still on display. Her name is attached to a geological formation in the Northern Territory, Australia. In 1871, King Charles I elevated the German-born Australian explorer Ferdinand Mueller to being "Freiherr von Mueller". He repaid the compliment as follows. A series of massive rock formations was discovered by the British-born Australian explorer Ernest Giles in central Australia in 1872. Mueller was Giles' benefactor. Giles had wanted to name the tallest peak Mt. Mueller, but Mueller prevailed on Giles to name it Mt. Olga, in honour of the queen. The entire geological formation then became known as "The Olgas", before the indigenous name "Kata Tjuta" was officially proclaimed in the 1980s.

== Later life ==
Queen Olga was noted for her dignity and queenly demeanor. On a visit by the royal couple to Austria-Hungary in July, 1873, a lady-in-waiting to Empress Elisabeth of Austria noted, "He is most insignificant. She makes a most imposing appearance ... the only one who is a queen ..."

In 1881, Olga wrote a memoir called Traum der Jugend goldener Stern (translated as The Golden Dream of My Youth) which described her childhood at the Russian Imperial Court, her grief at the loss of her sister Alexandra, and her early adult life, ending with her wedding to Charles. It is dedicated to her nieces, Grand Duchesses Olga and Vera of Russia.

When her husband died on 6 October 1891, Olga became queen dowager. She died one year later, on 30 October 1892, in Friedrichshafen, aged 70. She was buried in the crypt of the Altes Schloss (Old Castle) in Stuttgart.

== Honours ==
Royal Monogram as Queen of Württemberg

- Kingdom of Portugal: Dame of the Order of Queen Saint Isabel, 28 June 1865
- Württemberg: Dame of the Order of Olga, 1871

== See also ==
- History of Württemberg
- List of Württembergish royal consorts

Olga Nikolaevna of Russia House of Holstein-Gottorp-Romanov Cadet branch of the House of Oldenburg Born: 11 September 1822 Died: 30 October 1892
German royalty
Preceded by Pauline of Württemberg	Queen consort of Württemberg; 1864–1891	Succeeded by Charlotte of Schaumburg-Lippe
