= Wilhelm von Spitzemberg =

Baron Wilhelm Hugo von Spitzemberg (19 January 1825 – 4 September 1888) was a German soldier who became a favourite of King Charles I of Württemberg.

== Early life ==
Spitzemberg was born on 19 January 1825 in Stuttgart in the Kingdom of Württemberg. He was the eldest of four sons of Baron Louis François-Xavier Antoine Hugo von Spitzemberg (1781–1864), who was originally from Saint-Dié-des-Vosges, and Baroness Elisabeth Hugo von Massenbach (1803–1857). His brother was the Württemberg Ambassador in St. Petersburg, Baron Karl Hugo von Spitzemberg, who married Hildegard, Baroness von Varnbüler (a daughter of Minister Karl von Varnbüler und zu Hemmingen). His father was a Royal Württemberg Colonel-Chamberlain, Lieutenant-General and Master of the Court Hunters who was ennobled in 1833.

His paternal grandparents were Lorraine officer Louis-Charles Toussaint Hugo de Spitzemberg, a Major in the service of the Grand Duke of Tuscany and the former Anne Marie Catherine de Bazelaire de Lesseux. His maternal grandparents were Baron Eberhard von Massenbach and Baroness Caroline von Seckendorff. His nephew, Lothar Hugo von Spitzemberg, was chamberlain to Empress Augusta Victoria and a Prussian politician.

== Career ==
Spitzemberg served as Royal Württemberg Chamberlain and was a General in the Army of Württemberg. He is considered the first "intimate" long-standing "heart friendship" of King Charles I of Württemberg, who ruled Württemberg from 1864 until his death in 1891.

== Personal life ==
In 1858, Spitzemberg was married to Freiin Marie Hugo von Herman auf Wain (1837–1909), a daughter of Baron Benno von Herman and Baroness Pauline von Süsskind. Together, they were the parents of:

- Baroness Elisabeth Hugo von Spitzemberg (1860–1943), who married Baron Volkart von Ow-Wachendorf.
- Baroness Olga Hugo von Spitzemberg (1863–1956), who married Charles-Léon de Servins, Marquis d'Héricourt, Consul general of France in Leipzig.
- Baroness Amélie Charlotte Hugo von Spitzemberg (1869–1953), who married General Baron Franz von Soden.

Spitzemberg died on 4 September 1888 in Weißenburg in Bayern
