= Charlotte Wahl =

Latvian philanthropist

- Born: Charlotte Mundel; 16 November 1817; Riga, Latvia
- Died: 21 July 1894 (aged 76); Kirchheim unter Teck, Germany
- Education: Annen Institute
- Occupations: Philanthropist, Mother superior
- Known for: Charitable works
- Spouse: Georg Mundel
- Children: None

Charlotte Wahl née Mundel, (1817–1899), was a Latvian philanthropist who founded of many charitable organizations and is said "to have been the most decorated woman of her time."

== Life and work ==
Charlotte Mundel was born in Riga, Latvia, on 16 November 1817. She was the daughter of city architect Georg Mundel and studied at the Annen Institute in St. Petersburg, Russia. In 1837 she married Friedrich Wahl, a young Swabian manufacturer and the couple moved to Stuttgart, Germany, in 1849. The Wahl couple had no children.

Charlotte Wahl worked to clothe the poor families in her city sometimes collaborating closely with Queen Olga Nikolaevna of Russia, who lived much of the time at her summer home Villa Berg in Stuttgart. According to Fränkel, Wahl continued "for many years to dress poor country folk," even in times of conflict.

She provided plenty of food and drink, clothing and comfort for many of the wounded of both nations. Their rulers, the first two German emperors, princes of Bavaria, Saxony, and Russia, decorated [the philanthropists] partly personally, partly by handwriting, partly by medals; she is said to have been the most decorated woman of her time.

Wahl assumed leadership of several charitable associations, co-founded the Cannstatter Olga crèche, in addition to the St. Nicholas home for blind children, a house for mercy, institutions supporting nurses for small children, the orthopedic hospital for the poor and the local diaconate house.

Over the years, the Wahl financial fortune collapsed leaving her destitute. In response, she took on the role of Mother superior of the women's home in Kirchheim unter Teck and died there on 21 July 1894 after suffering stomach ailments.
