= Charles I of Württemberg =

King of Württemberg from 1864 to 1891

Charles I
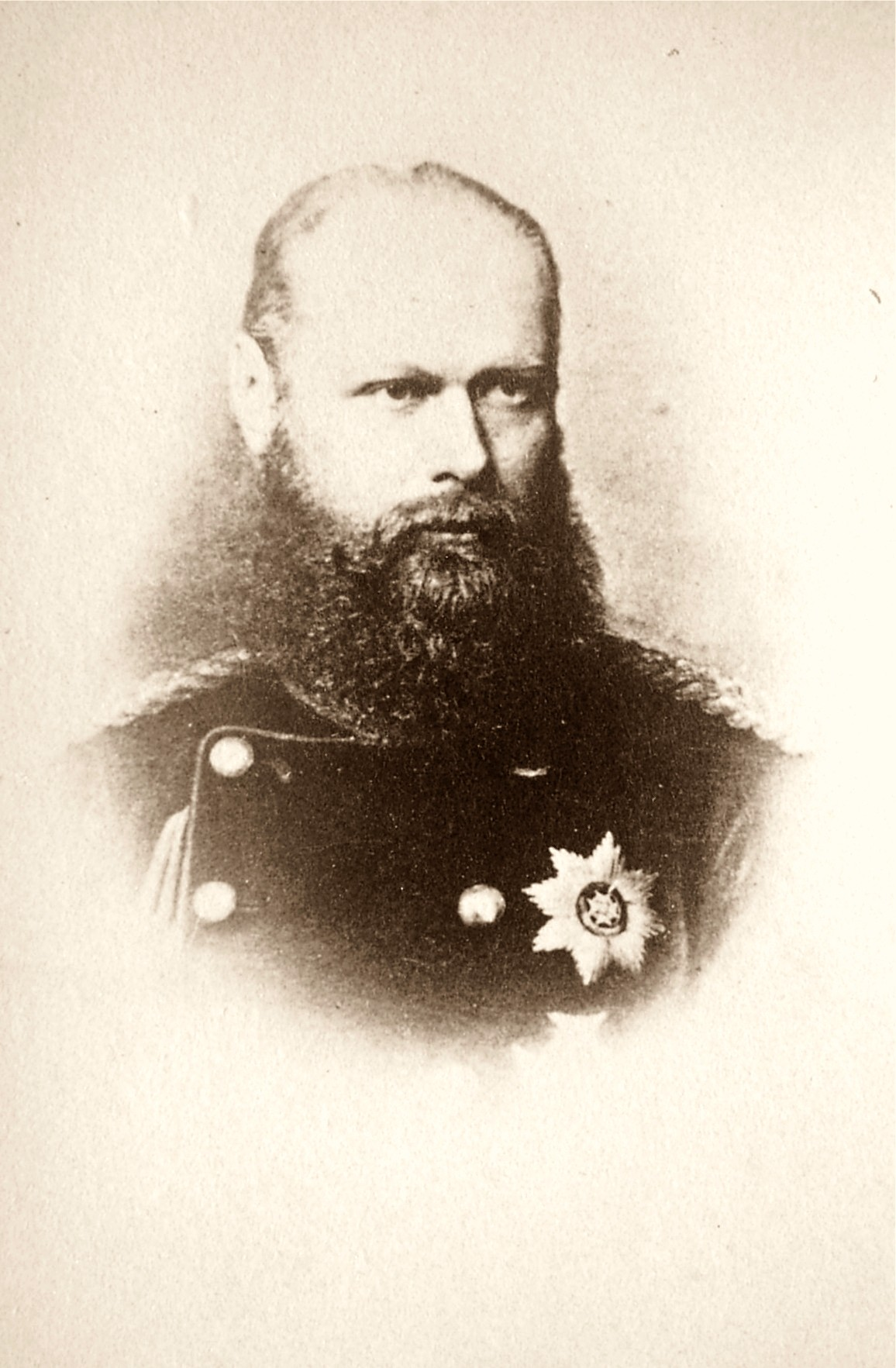

King of Württemberg
- Reign: 25 June 1864 – 6 October 1891
- Predecessor: William I
- Successor: William II
- Born: 6 March 1823; Stuttgart, Kingdom of Württemberg
- Died: 6 October 1891 (aged 68); Stuttgart, Kingdom of Württemberg
- Burial: 8 October 1891; Schlosskirche, Stuttgart, Germany
- Spouse: Grand Duchess Olga Nikolaevna of Russia (m. 1846)
Names
- Karl Friedrich Alexander
- House: Württemberg
- Father: William I of Württemberg
- Mother: Pauline Therese of Württemberg
- Religion: Lutheranism

Charles I (German: Karl Friedrich Alexander; 6 March 1823 – 6 October 1891) was the third King of Württemberg from 25 June 1864 until his death in 1891.

Born into the House of Württemberg, Charles was the only son of King William I and Queen Pauline Therese of Württemberg, and ascended to the throne upon his father's death in 1864. More liberal-leaning than his father, he restored freedom of the press and association in 1864, followed by an electoral reform in 1868 that expanded suffrage. In foreign policy, his early reign coincided with the turbulent years surrounding the unification of Germany, and Charles encountered many difficulties in his first years as king, as Austria and Prussia fought for supremacy over the German states. He initially aligned with Austria during the Austro-Prussian War but later sided with Prussia in the Franco-Prussian War, reluctantly joining the new German Empire under Prussian dominance in 1870.

Charles I married Grand Duchess Olga Nikolaevna of Russia in 1846. The couple had no children, likely due to Charles' homosexuality, and in 1870, the couple adopted Olga's niece, Grand Duchess Vera Konstantinovna. In the later years of his reign, the king, increasingly tired of office, withdraw into private life. Charles was involved in several scandals due to his sexual orientation, including a close relationship with American Charles Woodcock. As he died childless, he was succeeded by his nephew, King William II.

== Early life ==
=== Birth and family ===
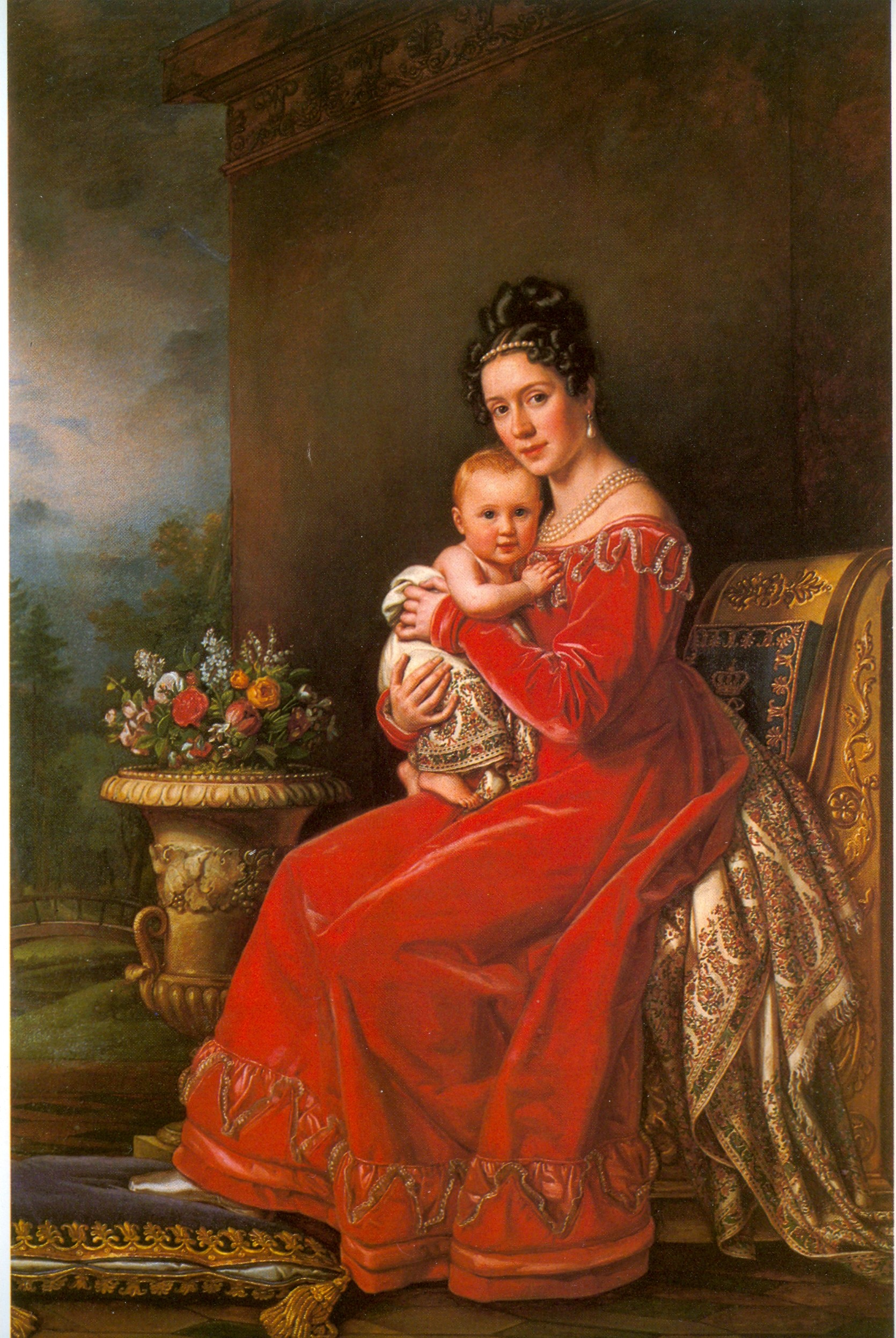
Queen Pauline Therese with her son, Crown Prince Charles. Portrait by Joseph Karl Stieler, c. 1825.

Charles was born on 6 March 1823 in Stuttgart, the capital of the Kingdom of Württemberg, as the only son of King William I and his third wife Queen Pauline Therese (1800–1873). As the reigning king's eldest son he was heir apparent to the Kingdom of Württemberg from birth with the title of Crown Prince. The birth was celebrated with a 101–gun salute being fired and all the church bells in the city of Stuttgart ringing.

Indeed, the birth of the young heir to the throne had been long-awaited. Already in 1808, his father had married his first wife, Princess Caroline Augusta, a daughter of King Maximilian I Joseph of Bavaria and Princess Augusta Wilhelmine of Hesse-Darmstadt. After their 1814 divorce, without issue, King William had married his first cousin, Grand Duchess Catherine Pavlovna of Russia, daughter of Emperor Paul I of Russia and Princess Sophie Dorothea of Württemberg. Catherine died in 1819 after giving birth to two daughters, and the king then married his third wife, nineteen years his junior, to produce the necessary male heir. When his son was born 15 years after his first wedding, King William I was forty-two years old.

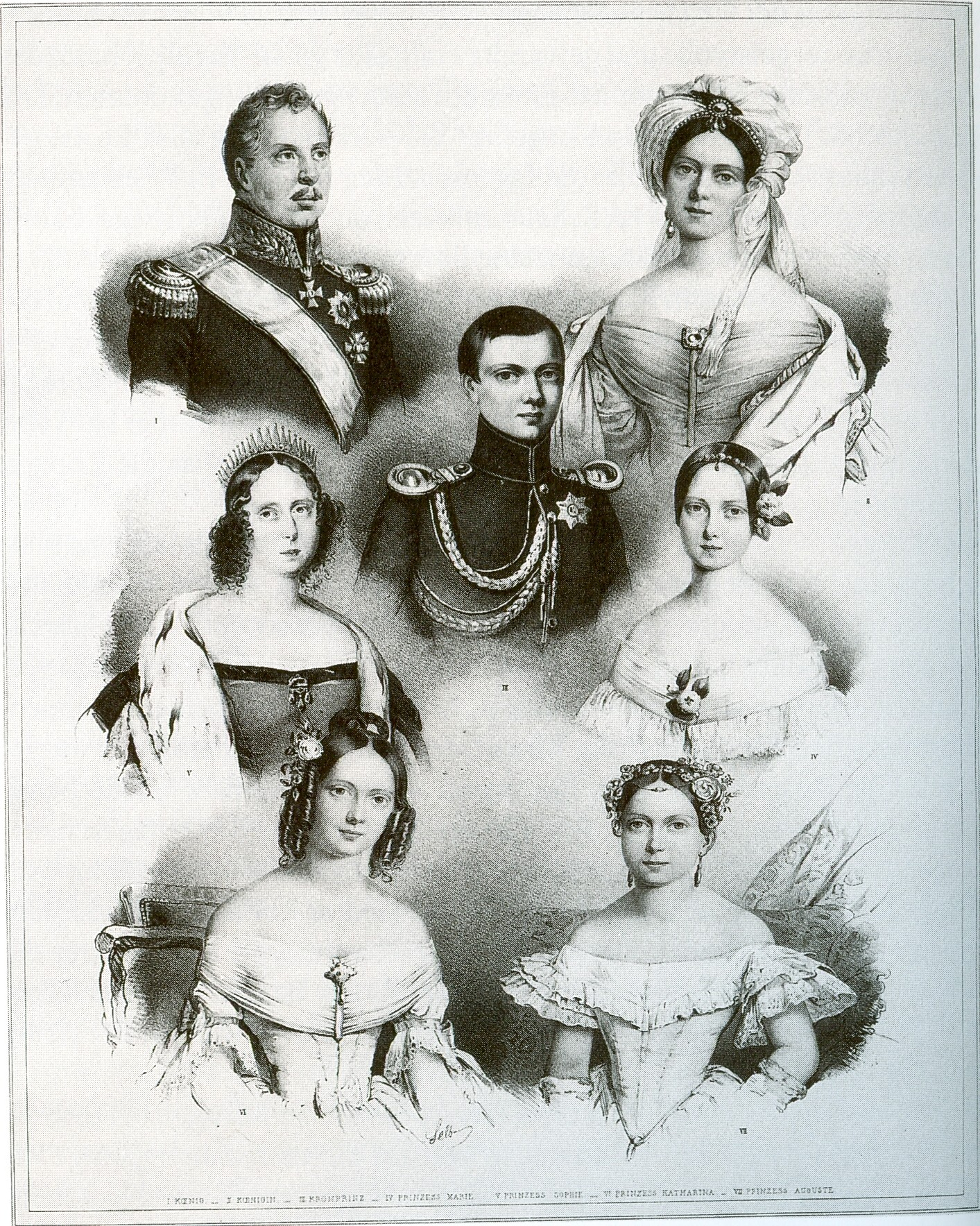
The family of King William I depicted in 1841 for the 25th anniversary of his accession: King William I and Queen Pauline Therese (top), Princess Sophie (middle left), Crown Prince Karl (centre), Princess Marie (middle right), Princess Catharine (bottom left) and Princess Augusta (bottom right).

His paternal grandparents were King Frederick I of Württemberg and Augusta of Brunswick-Wolfenbüttel (a daughter of Charles William Ferdinand, Duke of Brunswick and Princess Augusta of Great Britain, elder sister to King George III). His grandmother's younger sister, Princess Caroline married King George IV. His maternal grandparents were Duke Louis of Württemberg and Princess Henrietta of Nassau-Weilburg.

From his father's first marriage, Charles had two half-sisters, Princess Marie Friederike Charlotte of Württemberg (future wife of Alfred, Count von Neipperg) and Princess Sophie of Württemberg (future wife of King William III of the Netherlands). From his parents marriage, he had two sisters, Princess Catherine of Württemberg (future wife of Prince Frederick of Württemberg) and Princess Augusta of Württemberg (future wife of Prince Hermann of Saxe-Weimar-Eisenach).

=== Upbringing and education ===
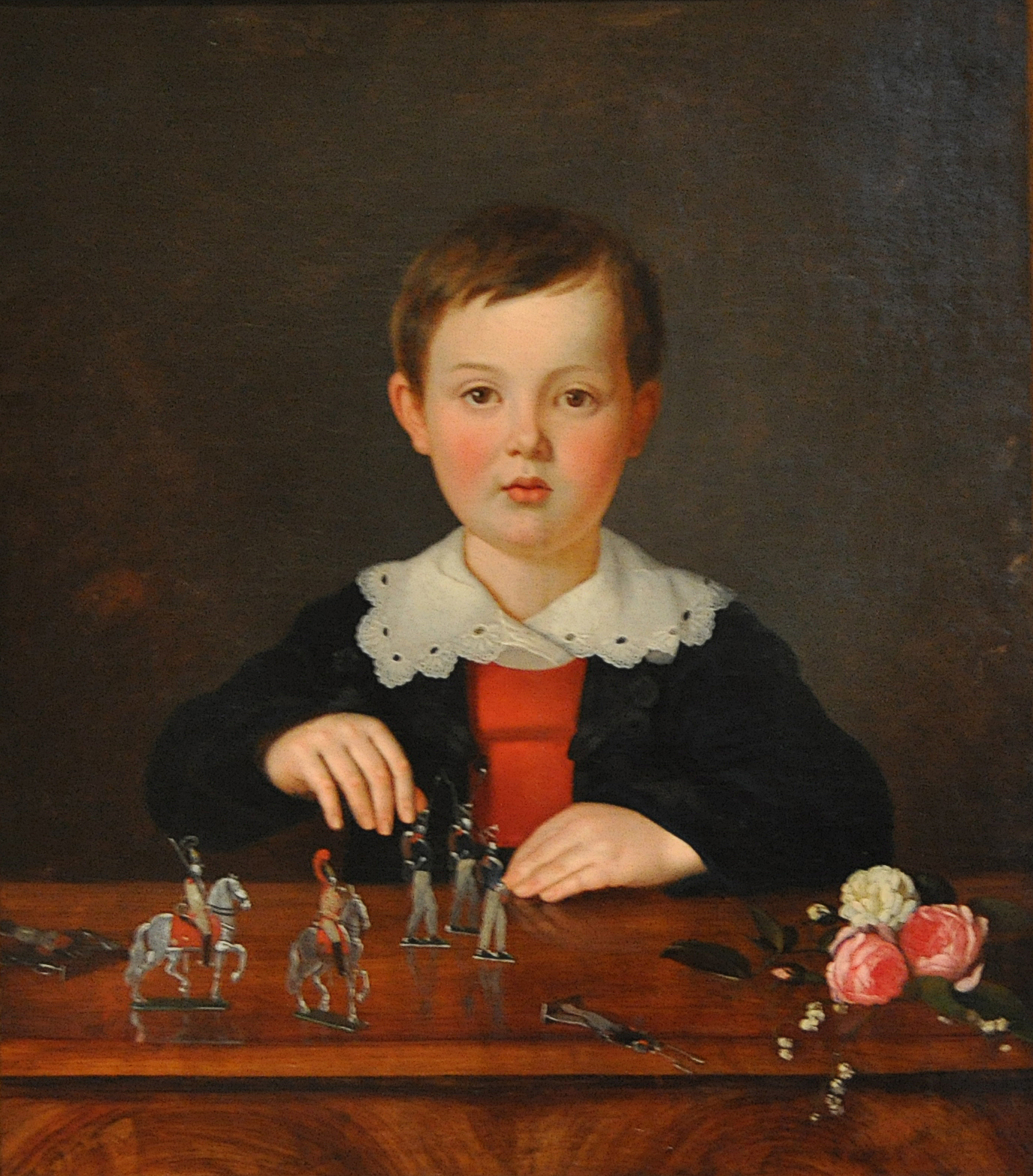
Portrait of Crown Prince Charles, by Franz Seraph Stirnbrand, 1835

The marriage of Charles' parents was unhappy, and was marred by King William I's numerous affairs, most notably with his longtime confidante and mistress, the German actress Amalie von Stubenrauch. Popular in Württemberg for her kindness and dedication to the poor but neglected by a husband nineteen years her senior, the queen bitterly withdrew from her husband, but at the same time adored and pampered her son. Queen Pauline Therese eventually left the court and settled in neighbouring Switzerland.

The young Crown Prince received his first education from private tutors at home. He then studied military science at the military academy in Ludwigsburg in 1838–1839, followed by academic studies at the universities of Berlin and Tübingen. The studies were followed by longer study trips to the Netherlands, Great Britain, Italy, Austria and throughout Germany. Socially, Prince Charles did not limit himself to his royal family circles and their courts. He frequented as an example the literary salon of the writer Bettina von Arnim in Berlin, and also became acquainted with the Romantic poet Emanuel Geibel in Stuttgart.

== Engagement and marriage ==
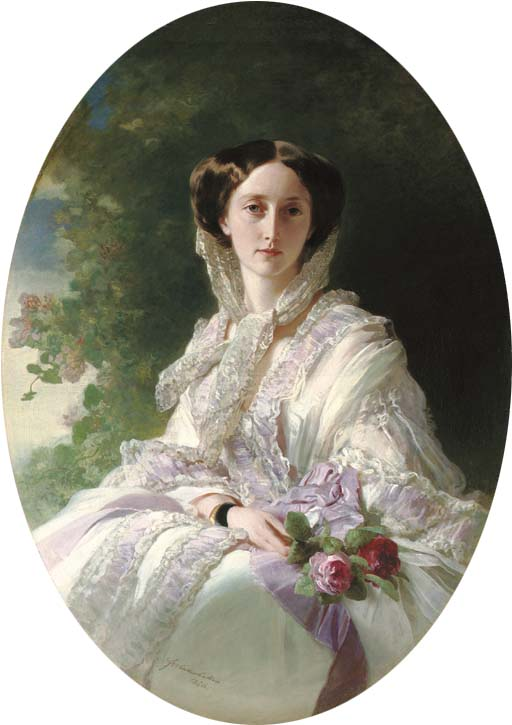
Crown Princess Olga, by Franz Xaver Winterhalter, 1856

After completing his studies and returning from the travels, the conclusion of a marriage was an obligatory task for the heir to the throne. On 18 January 1846, aged 22, he became engaged in Palermo to the 23-year-old Grand Duchess Olga Nikolaevna of Russia, the daughter of Emperor Nicholas I of Russia and Charlotte of Prussia (a daughter of King Frederick William III of Prussia and sister to William I, German Emperor). Olga was Charles' second cousin, as Olga's grandmother, Empress Maria Feodorovna, was the younger sister of Charles' grandfather, King Frederick. The wedding was celebrated in great splendour on 13 July 1846 at Peterhof Palace in Petergof outside of Saint Petersburg. On 23 September, they held their official entry into Württemberg's capital Stuttgart to great cheers from the population.

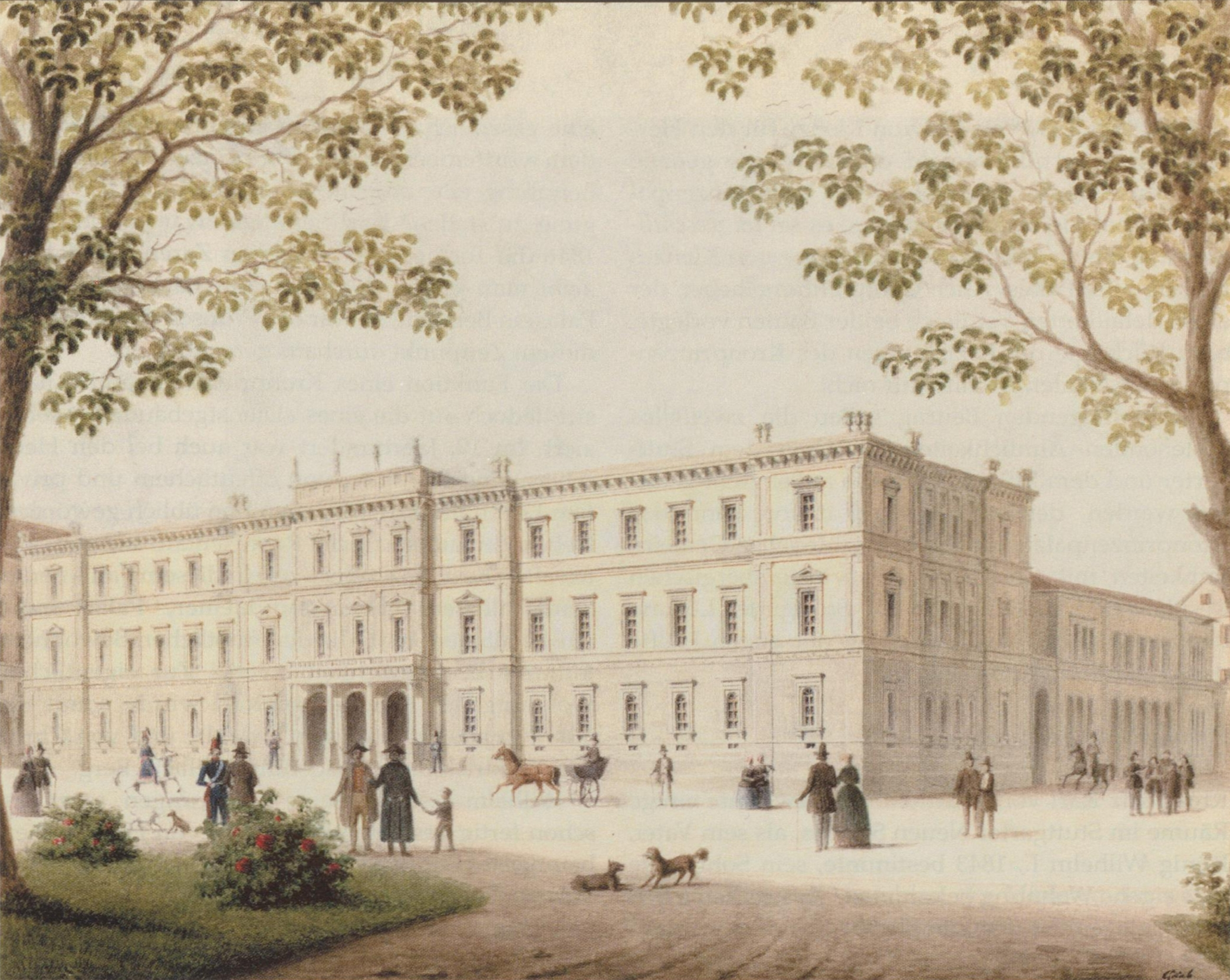
Kronprinzenpalais, 1845

After their wedding, the young couple settled in Württemberg. During the first years of their marriage, Karl and Olga lived in the New Palace in Stuttgart, until in 1854 they could move into the Crown Prince's Palace (German: Kronprinzenpalais), built for them at state expense in a representative location at Königstraße, on the corner of the Schloßplatz. They lived there from 1854 until Charles' accession in 1864. The building was demolished in c. 1962–1963).

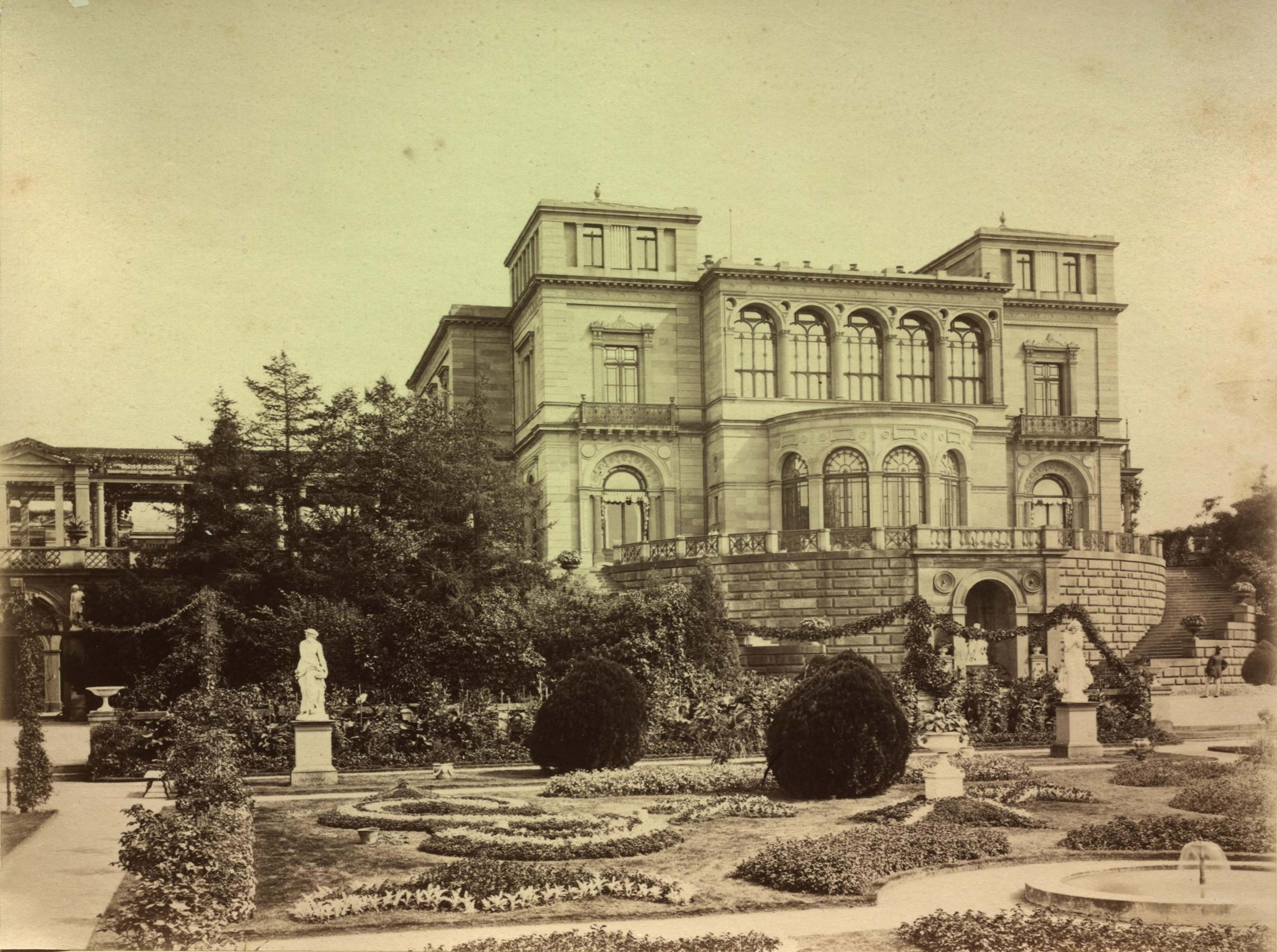
Villa Berg

However, Olga was not enthusiastic about the new residence because, unlike the New Palace, it did not have direct access to a garden. As a consequence, for their summer residence, the crown prince couple stayed at Villa Berg, a newly built villa on the outskirts of city. It was designed for them by the German architect Christian Friedrich von Leins according to the couple's own ideas and is considered one of the first Renaissance Revival style buildings in Germany.

== Life as heir to the throne ==
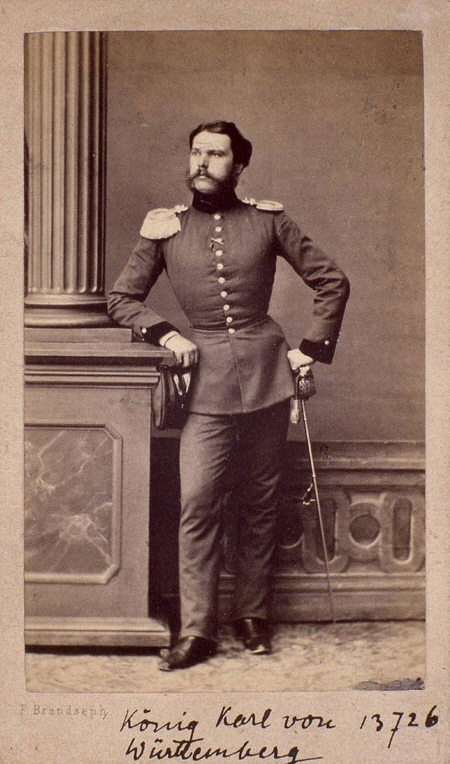
Crown Prince Charles. Photography by Friedrich Brandseph, 1850s.

Crown Prince Charles appeared to be well-prepared for his upcoming duties. With his admission to the Chamber of Lords in 1841 and the Privy Council in 1844, he became formally introduced to his future responsibilities. However, his father's strong personality left little room for the personal development of the heir to the throne. Nonetheless, in 1848 and between 1862 and 1864, he acted as regent for his ailing father on several occasions. In light of the conservatism that at least partly characterized King William I's later reign, liberal circles in particular had high expectations of the Crown Prince.

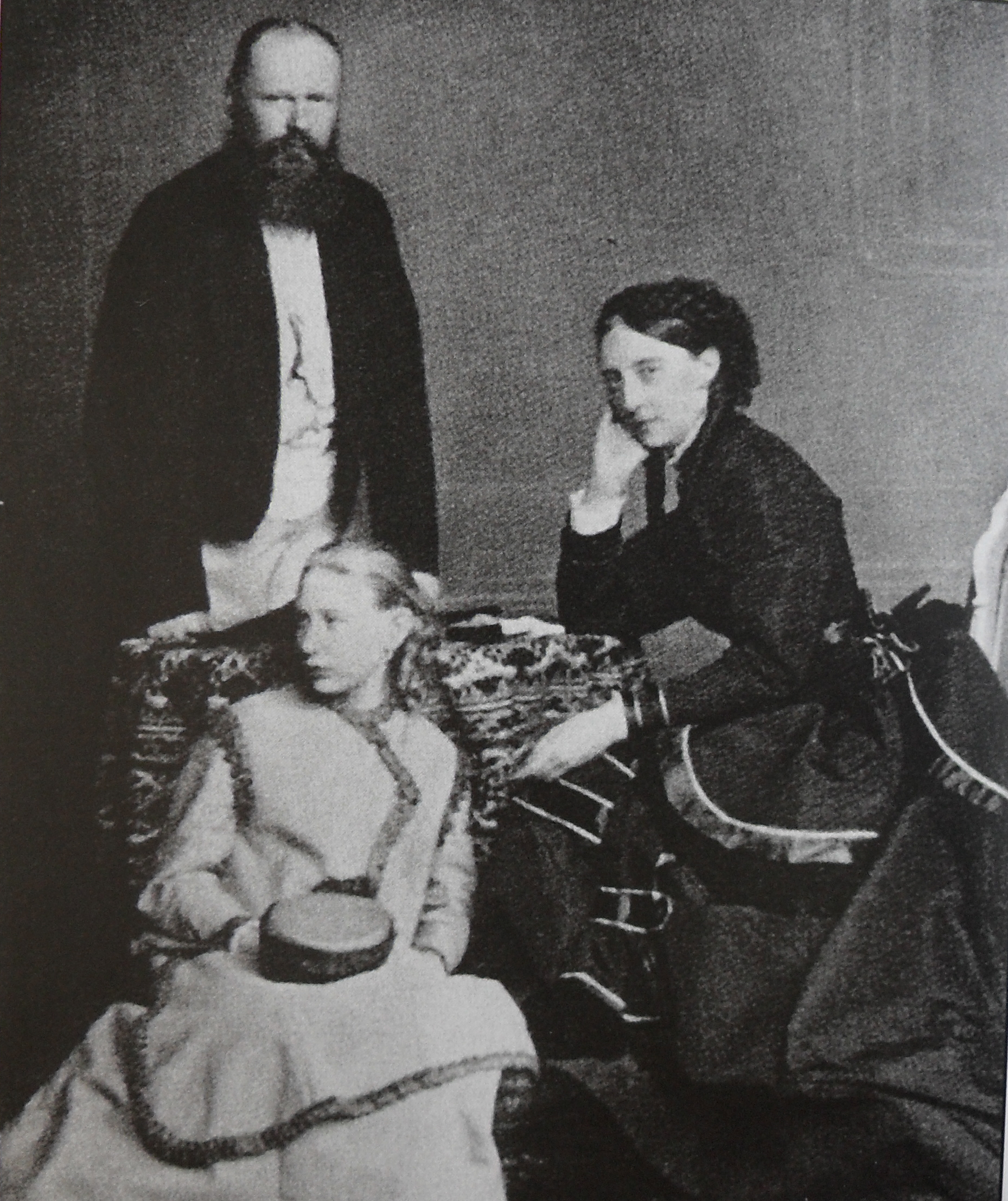
Olga and Charles with their foster daughter, Grand Duchess Vera.

His marriage to Olga Nikolaievna remained childless, perhaps because of Charles' homosexuality. Olga later wrote her memoirs that end on her wedding day. Instead, Olga and Charles took Olga's niece, Grand Duchess Vera Konstantinovna of Russia, the daughter of her brother Grand Duke Konstantin, in as a foster child in 1863, and she grew up with them from the age of 9. In 1870, Olga and Charles formally adopted Vera Konstantinovna. In 1874, they arranged a marriage for her to one of their relatives, Duke Eugene of Württemberg, who died prematurely three years later. Vera nonetheless remained in Württemberg, which she now considered her true home.

== Reign ==
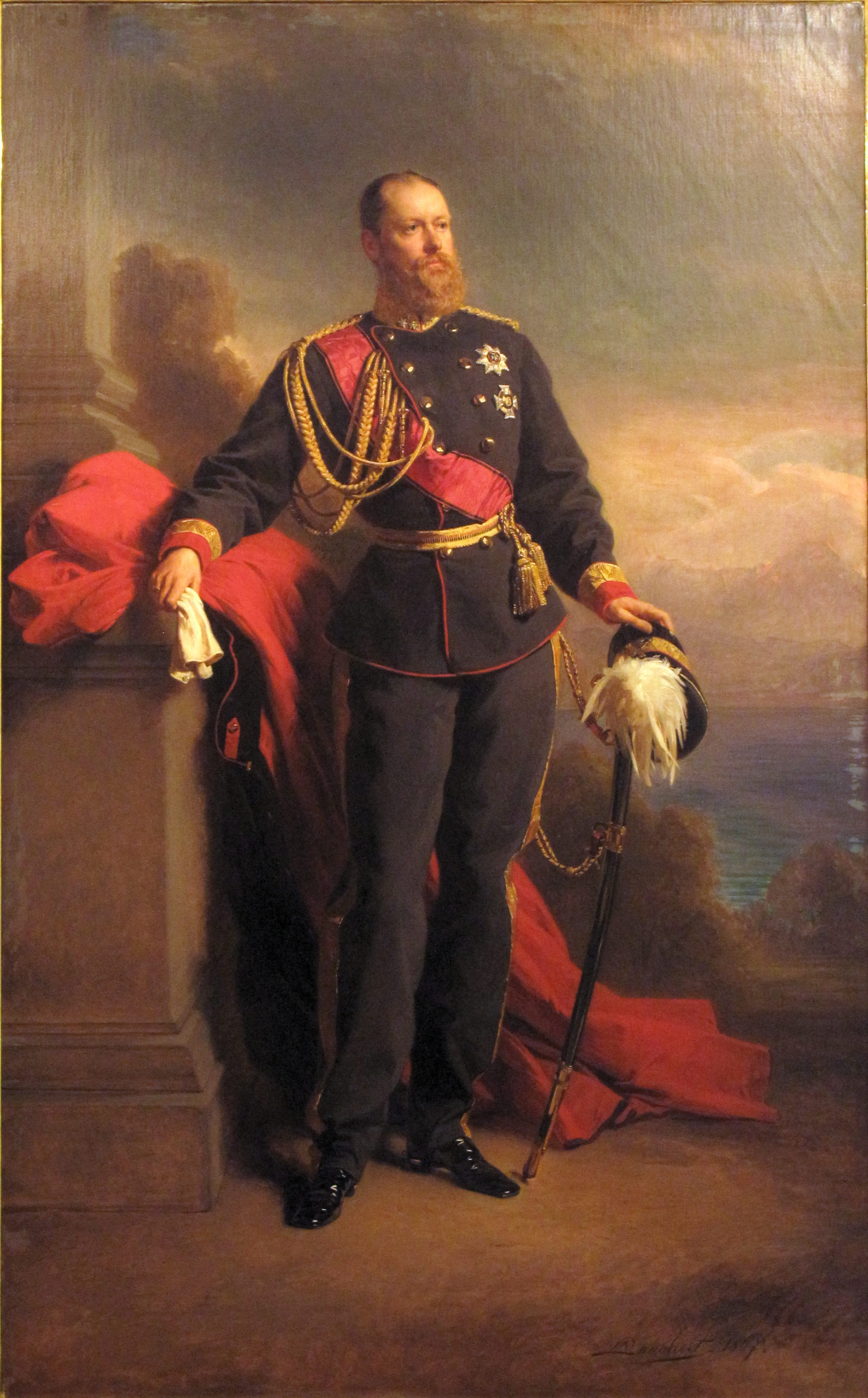
Portrait of Charles I, by Richard Lauchert, c. 1867

Charles acceded to the throne of Württemberg upon his father's death on 25 June 1864 and was enthroned on 12 July 1864. As expected, he proved more liberal-leaning than his father, and replaced the conservative Chief Minister Joseph von Linden with the liberal-conservative Karl von Varnbüler und zu Hemmingen. Freedom of the press and association were restored on 24 December 1864, and freedom of commerce and freedom of movement were also guaranteed. On 26 March 1868, this was followed by an electoral reform which introduced universal suffrage for the People's Deputies of the Second Chamber.

In relation to foreign policy, after siding with Austria in the Austro-Prussian War of 1866, he moved closer to the Kingdom of Prussia. Following the Battle of Sadowa, he enacted a secret military treaty with Prussia (which became public in 1867) and recognized the dissolution of the German Confederation in 1866. Nevertheless, an anti-Prussian attitude was officially represented by the Court, the government and the people.

Because of the alliance, Württemberg took Prussia's side in the Franco-Prussian War of 1870 to 1871. At the end of October 1870 the king withdrew to Friedrichshafen and in October 1870, signed one of the November treaties, joining the North German Confederation which began on 1 January 1871 and renamed itself the German Empire. He was represented at the Palace of Versailles at the Proclamation of the German Empire by his cousin, Prince August of Württemberg.

The King showed a tendency to withdraw into private life in other ways, travelling around the country and, later, spending time in Nice. In doing so, he was accused of having neglected the obligations incumbent on him as a constitutional body, including by having up to 800 unsigned documents accumulate in one case. On the one hand, it was a nuisance for the administration, but on the other hand it was also convenient for the government who was largely able to rule without interference from the King.

As a result of Württemberg being a Federal State of the German Empire since 1871, there were considerable restrictions on its sovereignty. Württemberg lost its previous international position, but gained greater security both internally and externally. Postal and telegraph services, financial sovereignty, cultural maintenance and railway administration remained in Württemberg hands, and the Kingdom of Württemberg also had its own military administration.

== Personal life ==
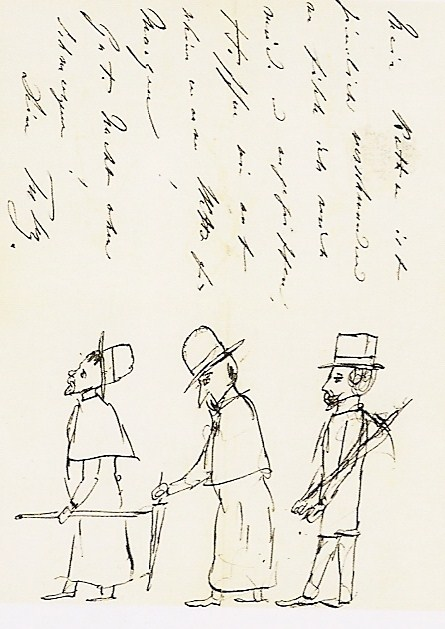
Handwritten letter from King Charles to Charles Woodcock from 1887.

Already during Charles' lifetime, there was ample evidence of a homoerotic inclination of the king, who became the object of scandal several times for his closeness with various men. A first "intimate" long-standing "heart friendship" was with his adjutant general, Baron Wilhelm von Spitzemberg. Another friend was the American Richard Jackson of Cincinnati, the secretary of the U.S. Consulate.

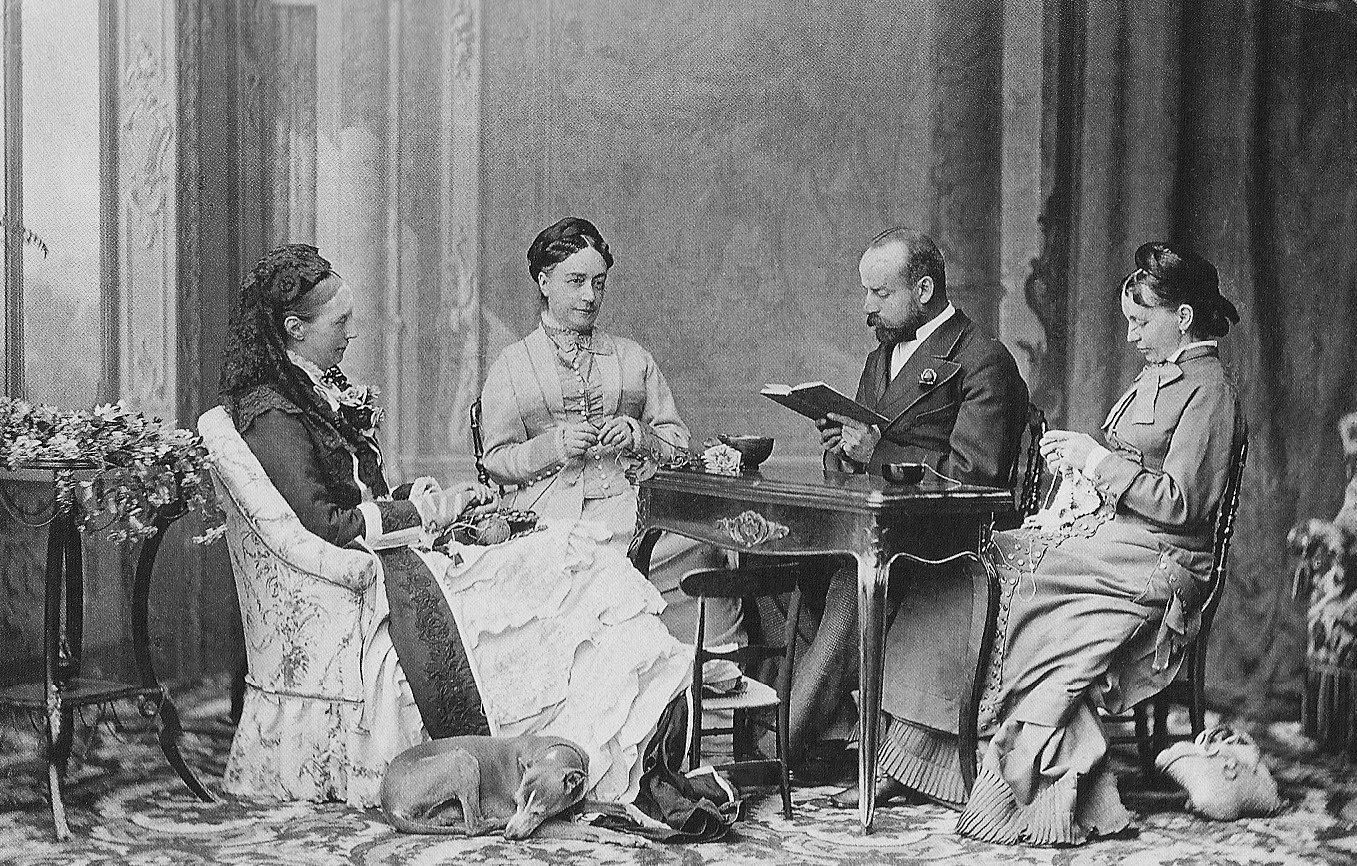
Charles Woodcock reads in Nice to Queen Olga of Württemberg in the arm chair and two ladies-in-waiting

Charles' most notorious relationship was with the American Charles Woodcock, a 30-year-old he met in 1883. The King made Woodcock his chamberlain and even elevated him as to Freiherr von Woodcock-Savage in 1888. Charles I and Charles Woodcock became inseparable, going so far as to appear together in public dressed identically. It was less the king's homosexuality than the fact that Woodcock used his position to exercise significant influence over the king's personnel decisions that became a scandal. This did not go unnoticed by the press, and together with the political establishment, headed by Prime Minister Hermann von Mittnacht, the King was put under intense pressure to give up Woodcock.

In 1889, however, Charles found a new friend in Wilhelm Georges, the technical director of the royal theater. The relationship with Georges lasted until the King's death two years later.

== Death and succession ==
After a stay at Bebenhausen Palace where he spent his autumns at Bebenhausen (and had tasked architect August Beyer with renovating the palace's rooms), he returned to Stuttgart on 3 October 1891, three days before his death on 6 October 1891. He was succeeded as King of Württemberg by his nephew, William II. His wife died a year later, on 30 October 1892, and was buried together with him in the Old Castle in Stuttgart.

== Honours ==
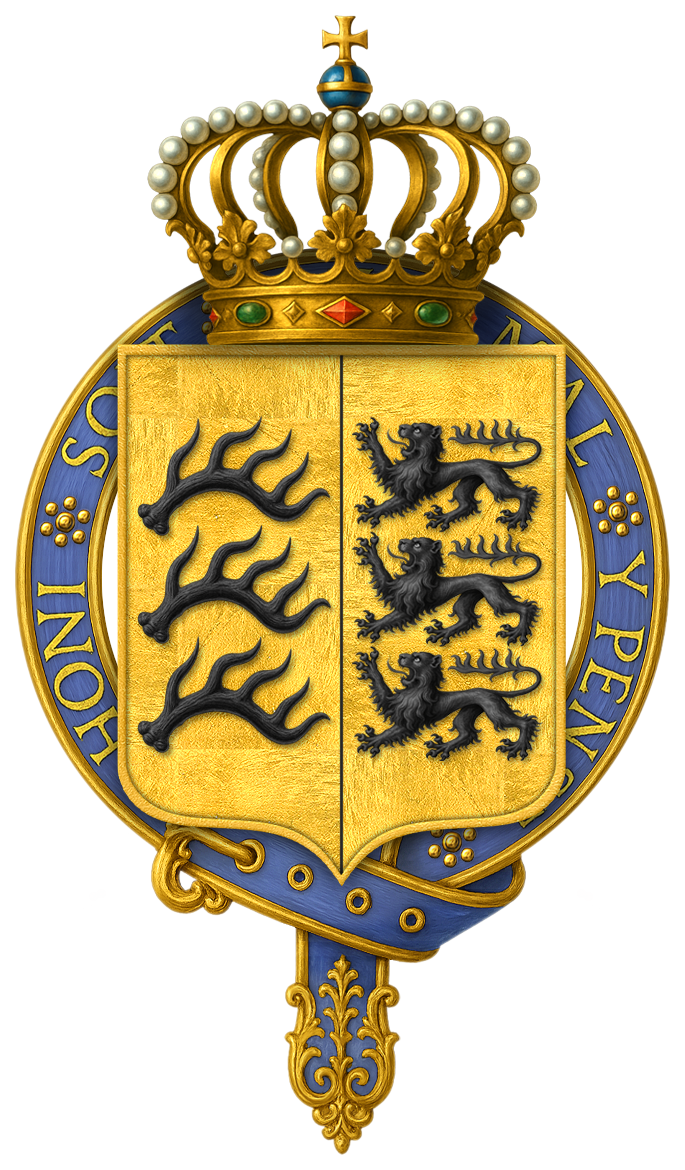
Coat of arms of King Charles encircled by the Order of the Garter.

- Württemberg:
  - Grand Cross of the Württemberg Crown, 1837
  - Grand Cross of the Friedrich Order
  - Founder of the Order of Olga, 27 June 1871
- Russian Empire: Knight of St. Andrew, April 1829
- Baden:
  - Grand Cross of the House Order of Fidelity, 1830
  - Grand Cross of the Zähringer Lion, 1830
- (Saxe-Coburg and Gotha) (Duchy of Saxe-Altenburg) (Saxe-Meiningen) Ernestine duchies: Grand Cross of the Saxe-Ernestine House Order, April 1841
- Kingdom of Prussia:
  - Knight of the Black Eagle, 20 May 1841; with Collar, 1861
  - Grand Commander's Cross of the Royal House Order of Hohenzollern, 22 September 1876
- Kingdom of Bavaria: Knight of St. Hubert, 1841
- Austrian Empire: Grand Cross of the Royal Hungarian Order of St. Stephen, 1845
- Saxe-Weimar-Eisenach: Grand Cross of the White Falcon, 19 September 1846
- Grand Duchy of Hesse: Grand Cross of the Ludwig Order, 22 October 1848
- Oldenburg: Grand Cross of the Order of Duke Peter Friedrich Ludwig, with Golden Crown, 17 October 1853
- Kingdom of Hanover:
  - Knight of St. George, 1855
  - Grand Cross of the Royal Guelphic Order, 1855
- Belgium: Grand Cordon of the Order of Leopold (military), 17 July 1864
- Kingdom of Saxony: Knight of the Rue Crown, 1864
- Monaco: Grand Cross of St. Charles, 24 September 1865
- French Empire: Grand Cross of the Legion of Honour, July 1867
- Sweden-Norway: Knight of the Seraphim, 17 October 1879
- Kingdom of Italy: Knight of the Annunciation, 13 April 1882
- Spain: Knight of the Golden Fleece, 6 February 1888
- Denmark: Knight of the Elephant, 23 June 1889
- United Kingdom: Stranger Knight Companion of the Garter, 23 April 1890

== Arms ==
Royal Monogram of King Charles I of Württemberg

Coat of Arms of the Kingdom of Württemberg, 1817

Royal Monogram of King Charles I of Württemberg, Variant

Charles I of Württemberg House of Württemberg Born: 6 March 1823 Died: 6 October 1891
Regnal titles
Preceded by William I	King of Württemberg; 1864–1891	Succeeded by William II
