= Charles Woodcock =

American lover of King Karl I of Württemberg

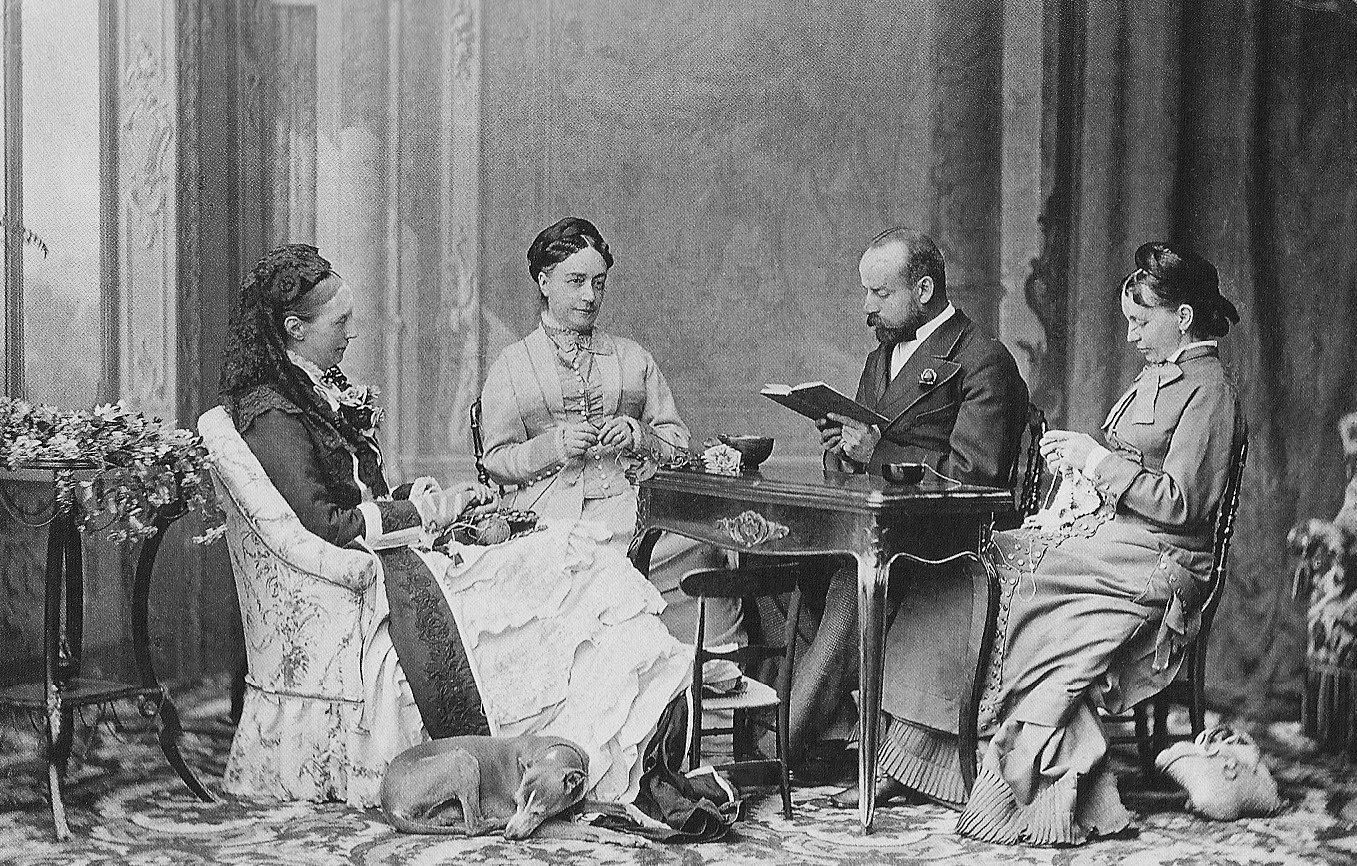
- Charles Woodcock reads in Nice to Queen Olga of Württemberg (in the armchair) and two ladies-in-waiting
- Born: Charles Burger Woodcock; May 1, 1850; New York City, New York, U.S.
- Died: June 26, 1923 (aged 73); New York City, New York, U.S.
- Resting place: Trinity Church Cemetery
- Other names: Freiherr Charles von Woodcock-Savage, Charles Savage
- Spouse: Henrietta Knebel Staples (m. 1894)

Charles Burger Woodcock, created Freiherr von Woodcock-Savage, later Charles Woodcock-Savage (1 May 1850 – 26 June 1923), was a New Yorker who achieved notoriety as the lover of King Karl I of Württemberg, by some decades his elder.

== Early life ==
Charles Woodcock was born in New York City, the son of Jonas Gurnee Woodcock (1822–1908) and Sarah Savage Woodcock (1824–1893).

== Career ==
He went abroad to study and found a place as chamberlain at the Royal Court of the Kingdom of Württemberg, where he became the favorite of the King, who had had several previous favourites. In 1888, Karl elevated Charles Woodcock to the nobility as "Freiherr von Woodcock-Savage", creating an uproar that sent Woodcock back to New York in 1890. In New York, he adopted the last name "Savage."

=== Writing career ===
In 1906, Charles, Freiherr von Woodcock-Savage, published A Lady in Waiting: Being extracts from the diary of Julie de Chesnil, sometime lady-in-waiting to her Majesty, Queen Marie Antoinette (New York: D. Appleton and Company). He dedicated it "To a Noble Soul I Knew and Loved and Mourn." The King had died in 1891. The introduction gives a circumstantial account of the yellowed pages found locked in the secret drawer of a Louis Seize cabinet sold at the auction house of Hôtel Drouot and bought by the translator's dear friend from Paris days, an aesthete, who gives permission to publish. The memoirs offered in this frame story are in fact a novelistic pseudo-autobiography.

== Personal life ==
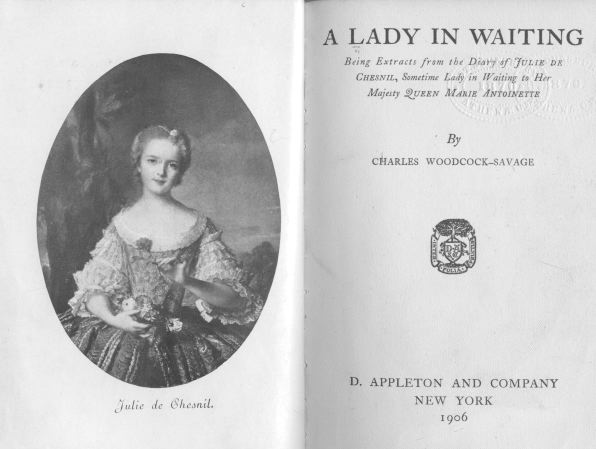
A Lady in Waiting: Being extracts from the diary of Julie de Chesnil, sometime lady-in-waiting to her Majesty, Queen Marie Antoinette (New York: D. Appleton & Company, 1906)

On 14 June 1894, three years after the death of the King, Charles married Henrietta Knebel Staples (born 1853), a wealthy German-born American widow with four sons. On 19 June 1897, all of her sons (Joseph, Harry, Herbert, and Leslie Curtis) legally changed their last names Staples to Savage. Leslie Curtis also changed his first name to Charles.

Savage died in New York City on 26 June 1923. His funeral was held at the Chapel of the Intercession on 155th Street.
