= Luitgard =

Luitgard is a German female name.

== Origin ==
The name comes from Old High German and means "[female] guardian of the people" (German: Beschützerin des Volks). This derives, in its older form, Liutgard, from liut which means "people" (Modern German: Leute), "member of a people", and gard which means "protection" or "guardianship", from which the German word Garten and the English word "garden" are also derived.

== Name day ==
Its name day is 16 October, the same date as that of the Blessed Luitgard of Wittichen.

== Variants ==
- Luitgart, Luitgardt, Lutgard, Lutgaarde, Lutgarde, Lutgart, Liutgard, Liutgart, Liudgard

== Notable bearers of the name ==
- Luitgard (died 4 June 800), last of the five wives of Charlemagne
- Luitgard Im (1930–1997), German actress
- Liutgard of Beutelsbach, benefactress of Hirsau Abbey and sister of Conrad I of Württemberg
- Liutgard of Saxony (died 885), wife of the King of East Francia, Louis the Younger
- Liutgard of Saxony (died 953), daughter of the Emperor Otto I's first marriage, who married Duke Conrad of Lorraine in 947
- Lutgardis of Luxemburg (c. 955 – c. 1005), wife of Arnulf, Count of Holland
- Luitgard of Swabia (died 1146), daughter of Frederick II of Swabia and Agnes of Saarbrücken, married Conrad I of Meissen in 1119
- Luitgart (died after 1150), daughter of Count Frederick I of Zollern, nun in Zwiefalten
- Lutgard of Salzwedel (died 1152), wife of Eric III, King of Denmark
- Lutgard of Tongern (1182–1246), Flemish mystic
- Luitgard of Tübingen (born c. 1240; died 1309), Countess Palatine of Tübingen
- Liutgart of Tübingen, wife of Burkhard V (died 1318), Count of Nagold-Wildberg, House of Hohenberg
- Blessed Luitgard of Wittichen (1291–1348), German nun, mystic and founder of Wittichen Abbey
- Luitgard Schwendenmann, ecosystem scientist in New Zealand
- Luitgard Veraart, German mathematician
