= County Palatine of Tübingen =

State of the Holy Roman Empire

County (Palatine) of Tübingen (Pfalz)grafschaft Tübingen
- 1007–1342
- Coat of arms
- Status: County
- Capital: Tübingen
- Historical era: Middle Ages
  - Limes established: AD 85
  - Hugo I invested with Holzgerlingen and Schönbuch: 1007
  - Raised to county palatine: 1146
  - Marchtal and Bebenhausen abbeys founded: 1171 and 1183
  - Tübingen granted town rights: 1231
  - Sold to Württemberg: 1342
Preceded by	Succeeded by
Duchy of Swabia; County of Zollern	County of Württemberg; Bebenhausen Abbey
- Today part of: Germany

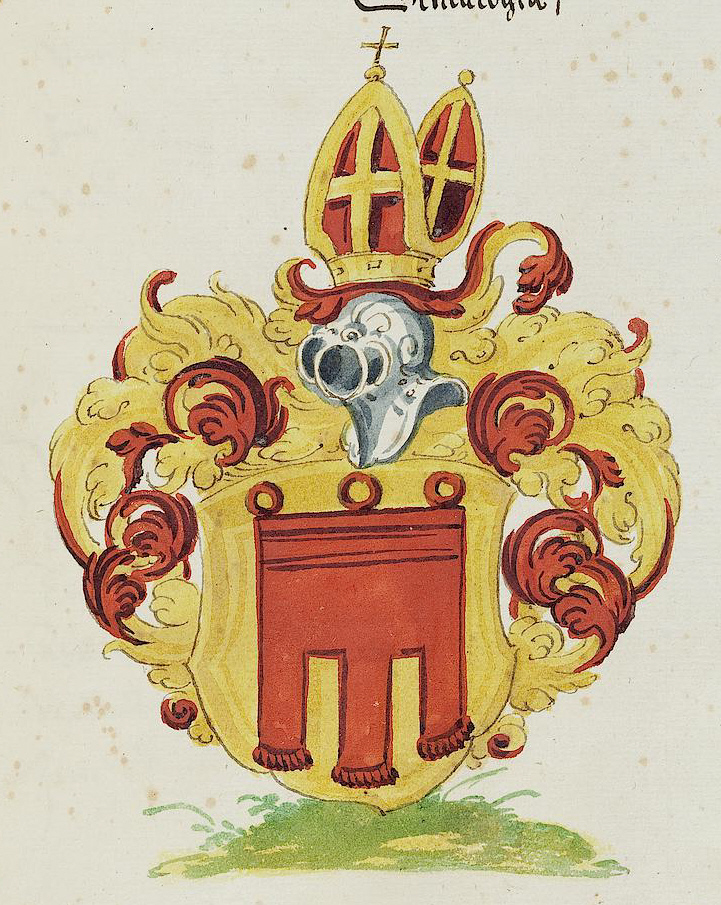
Original arms of the County Palatine of Tübingen

The County Palatine of Tübingen was a state of the Holy Roman Empire in the medieval period. The dynasty, originally based in Nagold, managed to acquire extensive holdings over the course of their time in power, distinguishing themselves by founding a large number monasteries in their territories. By the time of the High Middle Ages, several factors contributed to their economic decline, including the expenses of keeping court and extravagant donations to the monasteries they founded. The line itself experienced fragmentation into numerous cadet branches, the longest-lasting of which were the Counts of Tübingen-Lichteneck (until 1664) and the Counts of Montfort (1787).

== History ==
The oldest documented count of Nagold is Anselm of Nagoldgau the Elder, who is as recorded as possessing Kuppingen (modern Herrenberg-Kuppingen) in the year 966. He is followed by Anselm the Younger, who is mentioned in records from 1027 and 1048.

Between these two (the only two counts designated "of Nagoldgau") a certain Count Hugo I of Nagold, presumably from the same family, appears in 1007, when he was invested with the royal estates of Holzgerlingen and the Imperial forest at Schönbuch.

The city of Tübingen first appears in official records in 1191, and the local castle, Hohentübingen, has records going back to 1078 (as "castrum Twingia") when it was besieged by Henry IV, King of Germany in the context of the Investiture Controversy. Hugo III (who also founded Blaubeuren Abbey in 1085) would nevertheless submit to the king in 1079.

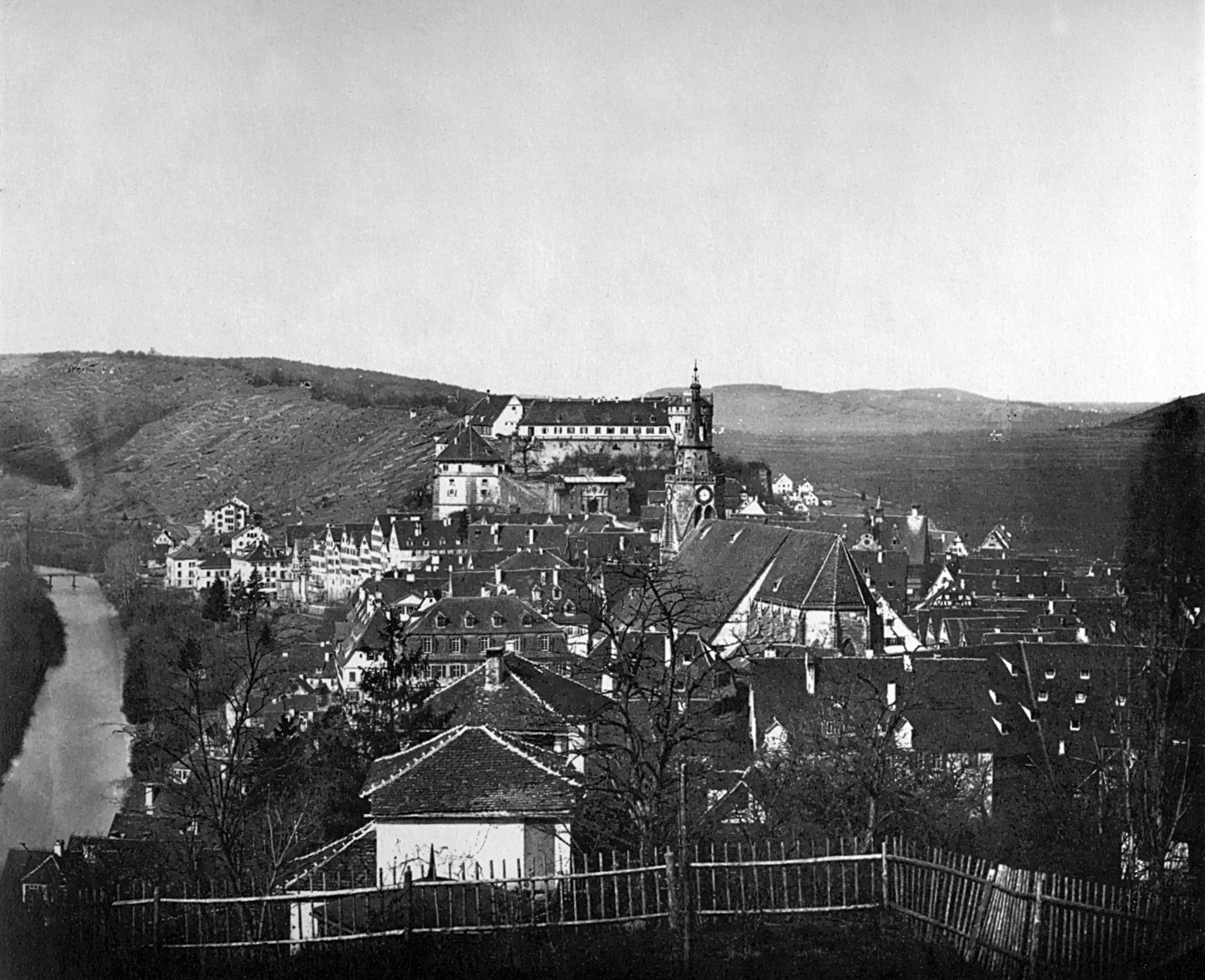
Castle Hohentübingen, 1875

From 1146, Hugo V (1125–1152) would bear the title of count palatine (Pfalzgraf), as Hugo I of Tübingen. This promotion is presumably due to services rendered to Conrad III, the first Hohenstaufen king of Germany, elected in 1138. By that point, the office of count palatine was no longer tied to its original task of maintaining a royal palace (whence the term “palatine”), but instead indicated that the holder exercised a certain degree of power and authority as the king's official representative within a stem duchy, making Hugo second only to the Duke of Swabia. As count palatine, he was also granted the right to exercise judicial powers in the king's stead, in addition to hunting rights, the right to collect customs, and the right to mint coins – as demonstrated by the Tübingen pfennig, which appears starting in 1185.

Hugo II (1153–82) gained Bregenz and other property in Raetia Curiensis, Tettnang and Sigmaringen by marriage to Elizabeth of Bregenz. In 1171, Hugo II founded Marchtal Abbey, and his first son Rudolph I would go on to found Bebenhausen Abbey in 1183. Rudolph also acquired Gießen via marriage to Matilda, countess of Gleiburg, which would later be sold to the landgraves of Hesse in 1264. Hugo's second son founded the Montfort dynasty, as Hugo I, Count of Montfort (d. 1230).

Upon the death of Rudolph I, his and Matilda's eldest son Rudolph II (1224–1247) became ruler of Horb, Herrenberg, and Tübingen. Their second son William would go on to found the Asberg-Gießen-Böblingen line. Rudolph II's son, originally Rudolph III of Tübingen, started what would be known as the Herrenberg Line, as Rudolph I of Scheer (d. 1277).

=== Decline ===
By the early 1300s, Count Palatine Gottfried I ("Götz") was deeply in debt to Bebenhausen Abbey. He signed over extensive rights to the abbey, even transferring control of Böblingen and Calw. In 1311, Henry VII placed the imperial ban on Count Eberhard I of Württemberg, and Gottfried was appointed Feldhauptmann in the imperial army, defeating Eberhard in May of that year. In a show of gratitude, the city of Esslingen assumed Gottfried's debts to the abbey, and he was able to recover the two towns.

Before long, however, his sons and his grandson Gottfried III would find themselves so deep in debt that they would enter into another debt-relief agreement, this time with the city of Tübingen, with Ulrich III, Count of Württemberg (Eberhard's son) acting as guarantor. For a nine-year period, the city would enjoy a wide range of privileges, including the right to elect their own Amtmänner (bailiffs) and to determine how their tax revenues were to be distributed. But in 1342, Gottfried found himself in conflict with Ulrich. Ordered by Emperor Louis the Bavarian to make full restitution, he was forced to sell Tübingen to Ulrich for 20,000 gold hellers.

Throughout the Middle Ages, the individual branches of the dynasty died out one after another: Horb by 1293, Asberg after 1357, Böblingen by 1377, with Herrenberg lasting until 1677. The last male member of the family to bear the name was Johann Georg, illegitimate son of Conrad William of Tübingen-Lichteneck. He served the duke of Württemberg in the Thirty Years' War as commander of the defenses at Hohentübingen Castle. In 1677, he died with no male heirs.

After the county palatine was sold to the County of Württemberg (or donated to Bebenhausen Abbey), it has since been part of the Duchy of Württemberg (1495–1806), the Kingdom of Württemberg (1806–1918), the Free People's State of Württemberg (1918–1945) and Baden-Württemberg (since 1952).

=== Coat of Arms ===
The arms of the Counts Palatine of Tübingen always consist of the same basic design, but in different color combinations, representing the various branches of the family. The original coat of arms consists of a red three-tailed banner (gonfanon) with gold rings and fringes on a gold shield.

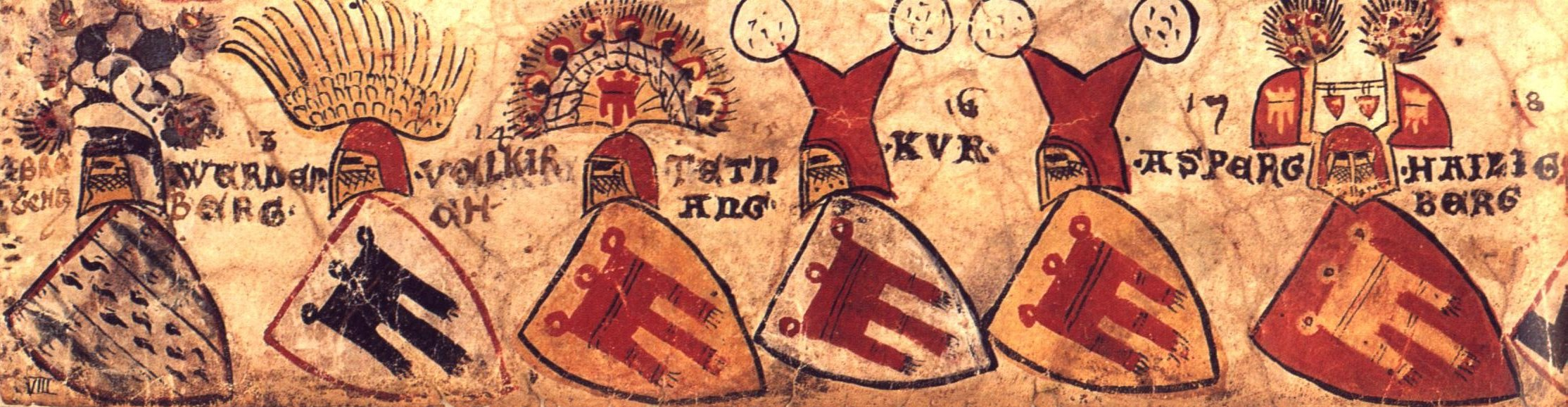
Various branches of the family, as displayed in the Zürich Armorial

The counts of Montfort adopted the red banner from the original arms, but placed them on a silver shield instead of a gold one. This version is used as the arms of the Austrian state of Vorarlberg, and also appears as an escutcheon on the state flag.

The counts of Werdenberg, who split off from the Montfort line, used a black banner on silver, while Werdenberg-Vaduz used a silver banner on black, and Werdenberg-Sargans a silver banner on red. The latter are featured in the arms of House Fürstenberg, having been acquired by the counts of Fürstenberg after the extinction of the Werdenberg-Sargans-Trochtelfingen line.

The arms of the County Palatine of Tübingen – or its cadet branches – have been displayed in the arms of several locations throughout the region, including Tübingen, Herrenberg, Böblingen, and Horb. While Horb later adopted the Hohenberg arms, the other towns have retained them to this day. Herrenberg reversed the colors, with a gold banner on a red shield. As for Tübingen, a pair of crossed arms holding antlers were added above the shield by Duke Ulrich of Württemberg in 1514.

== Rulers ==
=== House of Tübingen ===
Partitions of Tübingen under House of Tübingen rule

Counties of Nagold and Tübingen (1050–1146)
County of Asperg (1219–1308)		Raised to: County Palatine of Tübingen (1146–1247)
County of Asperg (1219–1308)		Raised to: County Palatine of Tübingen (1146–1247)		County of Montfort (1182–1260)				County of Werdenberg (1st creation) (1228–1247)
County of Asperg (1219–1308)		County of Horb (1247–1309)	County of Herrenberg (1247–1382)	County of Montfort (1182–1260)				County of Heiligenberg (1247–1402)
County of Boblingen (1252–1342) Renamed: County of Lichteneck (1342–1664)	Renamed: County of Beilstein (1308–1341)	County of Horb (1247–1309)	County of Herrenberg (1247–1382)	County of Montfort (1182–1260)				County of Heiligenberg (1247–1402)
County of Boblingen (1252–1342) Renamed: County of Lichteneck (1342–1664)	Renamed: County of Beilstein (1308–1341)	County of Horb (1247–1309)	County of Herrenberg (1247–1382)	County of Feldkirch (1260–1375)	County of Bregenz (1st creation) (1260–1338)		County of Tettnang (1260–1520)	County of Heiligenberg (1247–1402)
County of Boblingen (1252–1342) Renamed: County of Lichteneck (1342–1664)	Renamed: County of Beilstein (1308–1341)	Annexed to Hohenberg	County of Herrenberg (1247–1382)	County of Feldkirch (1260–1375)	County of Bregenz (1st creation) (1260–1338)		County of Tettnang (1260–1520)	County of Heiligenberg (1247–1402)
County of Boblingen (1252–1342) Renamed: County of Lichteneck (1342–1664)	Renamed: County of Beilstein (1308–1341)	Annexed to Hohenberg	County of Herrenberg (1247–1382)	County of Feldkirch (1260–1375)	County of Bregenz (1st creation) (1260–1338)		County of Tettnang (1260–1520)	County of Heiligenberg (1247–1402)		County of Sargans (1st creation) (1247–1396)	County of Vaduz (1322–1416)	County of Alpeck (1322–1383)
County of Boblingen (1252–1342) Renamed: County of Lichteneck (1342–1664)	Renamed: County of Beilstein (1308–1341)	Annexed to Hohenberg	County of Herrenberg (1247–1382)	County of Feldkirch (1260–1375)				County of Heiligenberg (1247–1402)		County of Sargans (1st creation) (1247–1396)	County of Vaduz (1322–1416)		County of Trochtelfingen (1332–1534)
County of Boblingen (1252–1342) Renamed: County of Lichteneck (1342–1664)	Annexed to Württemberg	Annexed to Hohenberg	County of Herrenberg (1247–1382)	County of Feldkirch (1260–1375)				County of Heiligenberg (1247–1402)		County of Sargans (1st creation) (1247–1396)	County of Vaduz (1322–1416)		County of Trochtelfingen (1332–1534)
County of Boblingen (1252–1342) Renamed: County of Lichteneck (1342–1664)	Annexed to Württemberg	Annexed to Hohenberg	County of Herrenberg (1247–1382)	Annexed to Austria	County of Bregenz (2nd creation) (1353–1458)	County of Pfannberg (1379–1524)			County of Rheineck (1373–1395)	County of Sargans (1st creation) (1247–1396)	County of Vaduz (1322–1416)		County of Trochtelfingen (1332–1534)
County of Boblingen (1252–1342) Renamed: County of Lichteneck (1342–1664)	Annexed to Württemberg	Annexed to Hohenberg	Annexed to Württemberg	Annexed to Austria	County of Bregenz (2nd creation) (1353–1458)	County of Pfannberg (1379–1524)			County of Rheineck (1373–1395)	County of Sargans (1st creation) (1247–1396)	County of Vaduz (1322–1416)	Annexed to Ulm	County of Trochtelfingen (1332–1534)
County of Boblingen (1252–1342) Renamed: County of Lichteneck (1342–1664)	Annexed to Württemberg	Annexed to Hohenberg	Annexed to Württemberg	Annexed to Austria	County of Bregenz (2nd creation) (1353–1458)	County of Pfannberg (1379–1524)			Annexed to Austria	Annexed to Toggenburg (1396-1436)	County of Vaduz (1322–1416)	Annexed to Ulm	County of Trochtelfingen (1332–1534)
County of Boblingen (1252–1342) Renamed: County of Lichteneck (1342–1664)	Annexed to Württemberg	Annexed to Hohenberg	Annexed to Württemberg	Annexed to Austria	County of Bregenz (2nd creation) (1353–1458)	County of Pfannberg (1379–1524)			Annexed to Austria	Annexed to Toggenburg (1396-1436)	Annexed to the Lordship of Brandis	Annexed to Ulm	County of Trochtelfingen (1332–1534)
County of Boblingen (1252–1342) Renamed: County of Lichteneck (1342–1664)	Annexed to Württemberg	Annexed to Hohenberg	Annexed to Württemberg	Annexed to Austria	County of Bregenz (2nd creation) (1353–1458)	County of Pfannberg (1379–1524)	County of Rothenfels (1438–1576)	County of Werdenberg (2nd creation) (1438–1483)	Annexed to Austria	County of Sargans (2nd creation) (1436–1483)	Annexed to the Lordship of Brandis	Annexed to Ulm	County of Trochtelfingen (1332–1534)
County of Boblingen (1252–1342) Renamed: County of Lichteneck (1342–1664)	Annexed to Württemberg	Annexed to Hohenberg	Annexed to Württemberg	Annexed to Austria	County of Bregenz (3rd creation) (1482–1523)	Renamed: County of Peggau (1524–1780)	County of Rothenfels (1438–1576)	Annexed to Switzerland	Annexed to Austria	Annexed to Switzerland	Annexed to the Lordship of Brandis	Annexed to Ulm	County of Trochtelfingen (1332–1534)
County of Boblingen (1252–1342) Renamed: County of Lichteneck (1342–1664)	Annexed to Württemberg	Annexed to Hohenberg	Annexed to Württemberg	Annexed to Austria	Annexed to Austria	Renamed: County of Peggau (1524–1780)		Annexed to Switzerland	Annexed to Austria	Annexed to Switzerland	Annexed to the Lordship of Brandis	Annexed to Ulm	County of Trochtelfingen (1332–1534)
County of Boblingen (1252–1342) Renamed: County of Lichteneck (1342–1664)	Annexed to Württemberg	Annexed to Hohenberg	Annexed to Württemberg	Annexed to Austria	Annexed to Austria	Renamed: County of Peggau (1524–1780)		Annexed to Switzerland	Annexed to Austria	Annexed to Switzerland	Annexed to the Lordship of Brandis	Annexed to Ulm	Divided between Fürstenberg and Austria (1534) and then annexed to Hohenzollern (1535)
County of Boblingen (1252–1342) Renamed: County of Lichteneck (1342–1664)	Annexed to Württemberg	Annexed to Hohenberg	Annexed to Württemberg	Annexed to Austria	Annexed to Austria	Renamed: County of Peggau (1524–1780)	Annexed to Königsegg	Annexed to Switzerland	Annexed to Austria	Annexed to Switzerland	Annexed to the Lordship of Brandis	Annexed to Ulm	Divided between Fürstenberg and Austria (1534) and then annexed to Hohenzollern (1535)
Annexed to Württemberg	Annexed to Württemberg	Annexed to Hohenberg	Annexed to Württemberg	Annexed to Austria	Annexed to Austria	Renamed: County of Peggau (1524–1780)	Annexed to Königsegg	Annexed to Switzerland	Annexed to Austria	Annexed to Switzerland	Annexed to the Lordship of Brandis	Annexed to Ulm	Divided between Fürstenberg and Austria (1534) and then annexed to Hohenzollern (1535)
Annexed to Württemberg	Annexed to Württemberg	Annexed to Hohenberg	Annexed to Württemberg	Annexed to Austria	Annexed to Austria	Annexed to Austria	Annexed to Königsegg	Annexed to Switzerland	Annexed to Austria	Annexed to Switzerland	Annexed to the Lordship of Brandis	Annexed to Ulm	Divided between Fürstenberg and Austria (1534) and then annexed to Hohenzollern (1535)

Table of rulers

==== Table of rulers ====
Notes on ruler numbering:
- The numbering of the counts is presented here in three major groups:
  - the Tubingen branch (Counties of Tubingen, Asperg/Beilstein, Boblingen, Horb and Herrenberg);
  - the Montfort branch (Counties of Montfort, Feldkirch, Tettnang, Bregenz, Pfannberg/Peggau, Werdenberg II and Rothenfels);
  - the Werdenberg branch (Counties of Werdenberg I, Heiligenberg, Sargans, Alpeck, Vaduz, Trochtelfingen and Rheineck). Each of the groups have a separate counting.
- The counts are numbered by year of succession. As much as possible, alternative numberings in other sources are presented in footnotes.

Ruler	Born	Reign	Ruling part	Consort	Death	Notes
Anselm the Younger	c.1020 ?	c.1050 – 1087	County of Nagold	Bertha two children	c.1087 aged 66-67?	Three brothers, divided the county of Nagold between them. Hugo moved to Tübingen in 1078. Sigibot's property may have been divided between his brothers after his death.
Hugo I	c.1020 ?	c.1050 – c.1087	County of Nagold (in Ammer and Schönbuch) (until 1078) County of Tübingen (from 1078)	Unknown at least one child	c.1087 aged 66-67?	Three brothers, divided the county of Nagold between them. Hugo moved to Tübingen in 1078. Sigibot's property may have been divided between his brothers after his death.
Sigibot	c.1020 ?	c.1050 – c.1080?	County of Nagold (in Ruck Castle and Blaubeuren)	Adelaide (of Egisheim?) three children	c.1080? aged 59-60?	Three brothers, divided the county of Nagold between them. Hugo moved to Tübingen in 1078. Sigibot's property may have been divided between his brothers after his death.
Hugo II	c.1060 Son of Hugo I	1087 – 1120	County of Tübingen	Emma of Arnstein four children	1120 aged 59-60?	His sister Bertha of Tübingen was Margravine of Baden.
Henry	c.1050 Son of Anselm and Bertha	1087 – 28 February 1103	County of Nagold	Adelaide of Enzberg no children	28 February 1103 aged 52-53?	At his death his property was probably inherited by his cousins, sons of Hugo I.
Nagold inherited by Tübingen
Hugo III	c.1090 Son of Hugo II and Emma of Arnstein	1120 – 1152	County of Tübingen (until 1146) County Palatine of Tübingen (from 1146)	Emma of Zollern four children	1152 aged 61-62?	In 1146 he was elevated to the rank of Count Palatine by Conrad III of Germany.
Frederick	c.1110 First son of Hugo III and Emma of Zollern	1152 – 1162	County Palatine of Tübingen	Unknown no children	1162 aged 51-52	Children of Hugo III, shared rule. Through his marriage with Elisabeth, Hugo IV inherited Bregenz, and many other possessions near Chur, Tettnang and Sigmaringen.
Hugo IV	c.1115 Second son of Hugo III and Emma of Zollern	1152 – 1182	County Palatine of Tübingen	Elisabeth, Countess of Bregenz; 1 May 1171 four children	1182 aged 66-67	Children of Hugo III, shared rule. Through his marriage with Elisabeth, Hugo IV inherited Bregenz, and many other possessions near Chur, Tettnang and Sigmaringen.
Henry I	1118; Third son of Hugo III and Emma of Zollern	1152 – 7 April 1167	County Palatine of Tübingen	Unmarried	7 April 1167; Italy aged 61-62?	Children of Hugo III, shared rule. Through his marriage with Elisabeth, Hugo IV inherited Bregenz, and many other possessions near Chur, Tettnang and Sigmaringen.
Rudolph I	c.1160 First son of Hugo IV and Elisabeth, Countess of Bregenz	1182 – 17 March 1219	County Palatine of Tübingen	Matilda of Giessen; 1181 six children	17 March 1219 aged 58-59	Children of Hugo IV, ruled jointly until 1208, when they divided their inheritance.
Hugo V & I	c.1175 Second son of Hugo IV and Elisabeth, Countess of Bregenz	1182 – 12 March 1228	County of Montfort (in Tübingen until 1208)	Matilda of Eschenbach-Schnabelburg two children Matilda of Wangen five children	12 March 1228 aged 52-53	Children of Hugo IV, ruled jointly until 1208, when they divided their inheritance.
Rudolph II	c.1185 First son of Rudolph I and Matilda of Giessen	17 March 1219 – 1 November 1247	County Palatine of Tübingen	? of Ronsberg four children	1 November 1247 aged 61-62	Children of Rudolph I, divided their inheritance.
William I	c.1190 Second son of Rudolph I and Matilda of Giessen	17 March 1219 – September 1256	County of Asperg	Willibirg of Württemberg (d. 1252) four children	September 1256 aged 64-65	Children of Rudolph I, divided their inheritance.
Rudolph I	c.1195 First son of Hugo V & I and Matilda of Eschenbach-Schnabelburg	12 March 1228 – 19 May 1248	County of Werdenberg (in Montfort until 1230)	Clementia of Kyburg (d. 5 October 1249) c.1230 six children	19 May 1248 aged 52-53	Children of Hugo V & I, ruled together until 1230, when they divided their inheritance.
Hugo II	c.1195 Second son of Hugo V & I and Matilda of Eschenbach-Schnabelburg	12 March 1228 – 15 August 1260	County of Montfort	Elisabeth of Burgau eight children	15 August 1260 aged 64-65	Children of Hugo V & I, ruled together until 1230, when they divided their inheritance.
Hugo VI	c.1210 First son of Rudolph II	1 November 1247 – 1267	County of Horb (with the County Palatine of Tübingen)	? of Dillingen one child Beatrice of Eberstein six children	1 November 1247 aged 61-62	Children of Rudolph I, divided their inheritance. Nagold was inherited by the Counts of Hohenberg.
Matilda	c.1210 Daughter of Rudolph II	1 November 1247 – c.1260?	County Palatine of Tübingen (at Nagold)	Burchard V, Count of Hohenberg five children	c.1260? aged 49-50?	Children of Rudolph I, divided their inheritance. Nagold was inherited by the Counts of Hohenberg.
Rudolph III	c.1210 Second son of Rudolph II	1 November 1247 – 12 May 1277	County of Herrenberg	? of Württemberg no children Adelaide of Eberstein-Sayn six children	12 May 1277; Vienna aged 66-67	Children of Rudolph I, divided their inheritance. Nagold was inherited by the Counts of Hohenberg.
Hugo I	1231; First son of Rudolph I and Clementia of Kyburg	19 May 1248 – 7 December 1280	County of Heiligenberg (with Werdenberg)	Matilda of Neuffen; 11 February 1263 six children	7 December 1280 aged 48-49	Children of Rudolph I, divided their inheritance.
Hartmann I	c.1235 Second son of Rudolph I and Clementia of Kyburg	19 May 1248 – 3 April 1271	County of Sargans	Elisabeth of Ortenburg; 26 June 1256 three children	3 April 1271 aged 35-36	Children of Rudolph I, divided their inheritance.
Ulrich I	c.1230 First son of William I and Willibirg of Württemberg	September 1256 – 5 August 1283	County of Asperg	Elisabeth of Veringen four children	5 August 1283 aged 49-50	Children of William I, divided their inheritance.
Rudolph IV	c.1230 Second son of William I and Willibirg of Württemberg	September 1256 – 1271	County of Böblingen	Luitgard of Calw three children	1271 aged 40-41	Children of William I, divided their inheritance.
Hugo III	c.1230 First son of Hugo II and Elisabeth of Burgau	15 August 1260 – 5 December 1309	County of Tettnang	Elisabeth two children	5 December 1309 aged 78-79?	Children of Hugo II, divided their inheritance.
Ulrich I	c.1230 Second son of Hugo II and Elisabeth of Burgau	15 August 1260 – 7 April 1287	County of Bregenz	Agnes of Helfenstein c.1272 two children	7 April 1287 aged 56-57	Children of Hugo II, divided their inheritance.
Rudolph II	c.1230 Third son of Hugo II and Elisabeth of Burgau	15 August 1260 – 19 October 1302	County of Feldkirch	Agnes of Groningen c.1265 seven children	19 October 1302 aged 71-72	Children of Hugo II, divided their inheritance.
Hugo VII	c.1240 First son of Hugo VI and Beatrice of Eberstein	1267 – 1277	County of Horb (with the County Palatine of Tübingen)	Unmarried	1277 aged 36-37	Ruled jointly. After their deaths without children, Horb passed to their sister, but the county Palatine passed to their cousins from Herrenberg.
Otto	c.1240 Second son of Hugo VI and Beatrice of Eberstein	1267 – 1289	County of Horb (with the County Palatine of Tübingen)	Unmarried	1289 aged 48-49	Ruled jointly. After their deaths without children, Horb passed to their sister, but the county Palatine passed to their cousins from Herrenberg.
Louis	c.1240 Third son of Hugo VI and Beatrice of Eberstein	1267 – 1294	County of Horb (with the County Palatine of Tübingen)	Unmarried	1294 aged 53-54	Ruled jointly. After their deaths without children, Horb passed to their sister, but the county Palatine passed to their cousins from Herrenberg.
Rudolph II	c.1257 Son of Hartmann I and Elisabeth of Ortenburg	3 April 1271 – 18 March 1323	County of Sargans	Adelaide of Burgau; 1282 five children	18 March 1323 aged 65-66	
Godfrey I	c.1250 Son of Rudolph IV and Luitgard of Calw	1271 – 30 January 1316	County of Böblingen (with the County Palatine of Tübingen from 1294)	Elisabeth of Fürstenberg; 19 July 1282 seven children	30 January 1316 aged 65-66	
Eberhard I	c.1250 First son of Rudolph III and Adelaide of Eberstein-Sayn	12 May 1277 – 21 April 1302	County of Herrenberg (with the County Palatine of Tübingen in 1294)	Adelaide of Vaihingen; 26 November 1286 two children	1316 aged 66-67	Children of Rudolph III, ruled jointly. Inherited Tübingen in 1294 from the Horb line, but sold it to the Boblingen line in the same year.
Rudolph V	c.1250 Second son of Rudolph III and Adelaide of Eberstein-Sayn	12 May 1277 – 1316	County of Herrenberg (with the County Palatine of Tübingen in 1294)	Luitgard of Schelklingen; 24 November 1286 four children	1316 aged 66-67	Children of Rudolph III, ruled jointly. Inherited Tübingen in 1294 from the Horb line, but sold it to the Boblingen line in the same year.
Hugo II the One-Eyed	c.1265 Son of Hugo I and Matilda of Neuffen	7 December 1280 – 25 March 1307	County of Heiligenberg (with Werdenberg)	Euphemia of Ortenburg; 3 June 1281 eleven children	25 March 1307 aged 41-42	
Ulrich II	c.1270 Son of Ulrich I and Elisabeth of Veringen	5 August 1283 – 1341	County of Asperg (until 1308) County of Beilstein (from 1308)	Anna of Löwenstein four children	1341 aged 70-71?	Sold Asperg in 1308 to Württemberg, and, after his death, Beilstein was also sold to the same county.
Asperg and Beilstein annexed to Württemberg
Regency of Rudolph II, Count of Feldkirch (1287-1294)						Acquired the Weiler and Scheidegg estates in 1296, the pledge of the Bregenzerwald in 1307, the Staufen estate in 1311, the pledges of Wangen and Leutkirch in 1315/18, the estates of Gutenberg in 1322, a market privilege for Bregenz in 1330, and the estates of Raitnau, Schönau, Aeschach, and Rickenbach in 1334. Sold half of Bregenz to Austria. Left no descendants and Bregenz was annexed to Tettnang.
Hugo IV	c.1280 Son of Ulrich I and Agnes of Helfenstein	7 April 1287 – 26 July 1338	County of Bregenz	Unmarried	26 July 1338 aged 57-58	Acquired the Weiler and Scheidegg estates in 1296, the pledge of the Bregenzerwald in 1307, the Staufen estate in 1311, the pledges of Wangen and Leutkirch in 1315/18, the estates of Gutenberg in 1322, a market privilege for Bregenz in 1330, and the estates of Raitnau, Schönau, Aeschach, and Rickenbach in 1334. Sold half of Bregenz to Austria. Left no descendants and Bregenz was annexed to Tettnang.
Bregenz annexed to Tettnang
Luitgard	c.1240 Daughter of Hugo VI and Beatrice of Eberstein	1294 – 13 November 1309	County of Horb	Burchard IV, Count of Hohenberg c.1275 three children	13 November 1309 aged 68-69	
Horb annexed to Hohenberg
Hugo V	c.1270 Son of Rudolph II and Agnes of Groningen	19 October 1302 – 11 August 1310	County of Feldkirch	Anna of Veringen eight children	11 August 1310 aged 39-40	
Hugo III Cocles	c.1280 First son of Hugo II and Euphemia of Ortenburg	1307 – 1330	County of Heiligenberg (with Werdenberg)	Anna of Wildenberg; 1320 (bef. 1 April) no children	c.1330 aged 49-50	Sons of Hugo II, ruled jointly.
Albert I	c.1283 Second son of Hugo II and Euphemia of Ortenburg	25 March 1307 – 1365	County of Heiligenberg (with Werdenberg)	Catherine of Habsburg-Kyburg c.1310 three children	c.1365 aged 81-82	Sons of Hugo II, ruled jointly.
William I	c.1280? Son of Hugo III and Elisabeth	5 December 1309 – 1350	County of Tettnang	Elisabeth von Schlüsselberg one child Maria Anna Magdalena von Schwarzenberg no children Kunigunde of Rappoltstein six children Unknown no children	c.1350 aged 69-70?	Inherited Bregenz in 1338.
Regency of Ulrich (II) of Montfort and Rudolph (III) of Montfort, Bishop of Chur (1310-1314?)						Children of Hugo V. Most of the brothers ruled jointly. Hugo VI had a separate seat at Tosters. They ruled under regency of their uncles, who favored the settlement of Jews in Feldkirch. Rudolph IV may have associated his eldest son , Ulrich III, to the co-ruling.
Frederick	c.1300 First son of Hugo V and Anna of Veringen	11 August 1310 – 25 March 1321	County of Feldkirch	Unmarried	25 March 1321 aged 20-21	Children of Hugo V. Most of the brothers ruled jointly. Hugo VI had a separate seat at Tosters. They ruled under regency of their uncles, who favored the settlement of Jews in Feldkirch. Rudolph IV may have associated his eldest son , Ulrich III, to the co-ruling.
Berthold	c.1300 Second son of Hugo V and Anna of Veringen	11 August 1310 – 18 January 1318	County of Feldkirch	Unmarried	18 January 1318 aged 17-18	Children of Hugo V. Most of the brothers ruled jointly. Hugo VI had a separate seat at Tosters. They ruled under regency of their uncles, who favored the settlement of Jews in Feldkirch. Rudolph IV may have associated his eldest son , Ulrich III, to the co-ruling.
Rudolph IV the Elder	c.1300 Third son of Hugo V and Anna of Veringen	11 August 1310 – 13 March 1375	County of Feldkirch	Anna of Berg-Schelkingen; 1332 eight children Elisabeth of Nellenburg; 1362 no children	13 March 1375 aged 74-75	Children of Hugo V. Most of the brothers ruled jointly. Hugo VI had a separate seat at Tosters. They ruled under regency of their uncles, who favored the settlement of Jews in Feldkirch. Rudolph IV may have associated his eldest son , Ulrich III, to the co-ruling.
Ulrich III	c.1330 First son of Rudolph IV and Anna of Berg-Schelkingen	c.1350 – April 1362	County of Feldkirch	Unmarried	c.1362 aged 31-32	Children of Hugo V. Most of the brothers ruled jointly. Hugo VI had a separate seat at Tosters. They ruled under regency of their uncles, who favored the settlement of Jews in Feldkirch. Rudolph IV may have associated his eldest son , Ulrich III, to the co-ruling.
Hugo VI	c.1300 Fourth son of Hugo V and Anna of Veringen	11 August 1310 – 29 March 1359	County of Feldkirch (at Tosters)	Margaret of Furstenberg no children Bertha of Kirchberg c.1341 two children	c.1360 aged 59-60	Children of Hugo V. Most of the brothers ruled jointly. Hugo VI had a separate seat at Tosters. They ruled under regency of their uncles, who favored the settlement of Jews in Feldkirch. Rudolph IV may have associated his eldest son , Ulrich III, to the co-ruling.
William II	c.1285 Son of Godfrey I and Elisabeth of Fürstenberg	30 January 1316 – 1327	County of Böblingen (with the County Palatine of Tübingen)	Heilika of Eberstein five children	1327 aged 41-42	
Conrad I	c.1290 First son of Eberhard and Adelaide of Vaihingen	1316 – 1377	County of Herrenberg	Margaretha Speth von Faymingen; 25 May 1337 three children	1316 aged 66-67	Children of Eberhard, ruled jointly.
Rudolph VI	c.1290 Second son of Eberhard and Adelaide of Vaihingen	1316 – 8 December 1356	County of Herrenberg	Adelaide of Ochenstein four children	1316 aged 66-67	Children of Eberhard, ruled jointly.
Rudolph III	c.1293 First son of Rudolph II and Adelaide of Burgau	18 March 1323 – 1325	County of Sargans	Unmarried	1325 aged 31-32	Left no descendants. His brothers inherited his property, and divided it between them.
Henry I	c.1300 Second son of Rudolph II and Adelaide of Burgau	1325 – June 1334	County of Alpeck	Agnes of Württemberg c.1317 six children	June 1334 aged 33-34	Younger children of Rudolph II, divided their inheritance. Rudolph IV assume alone the rulership of Sargans after the death of his older brother and namesake. In 1338, after the death of Count Donat of Vaz, he could inherit a part of his domains, as husband of Ursula.
Rudolph IV	c.1300 Third son of Rudolph II and Adelaide of Burgau	1325 – March 1361	County of Sargans	Ursula of Vaz; 15 August 1337 one child	March 1361; Chiavenna aged 60-61	Younger children of Rudolph II, divided their inheritance. Rudolph IV assume alone the rulership of Sargans after the death of his older brother and namesake. In 1338, after the death of Count Donat of Vaz, he could inherit a part of his domains, as husband of Ursula.
Hartmann II	c.1305 Fourth son of Rudolph II and Adelaide of Burgau	1325 – 27 August 1354	County of Vaduz	Agnes of Montfort-Feldkirch c.1340 three children	27 August 1354 aged 50-51	Younger children of Rudolph II, divided their inheritance. Rudolph IV assume alone the rulership of Sargans after the death of his older brother and namesake. In 1338, after the death of Count Donat of Vaz, he could inherit a part of his domains, as husband of Ursula.
Godfrey II	c.1300 Son of William II and Heilika of Eberstein	1327 – February 1369	County of Böblingen (with the County Palatine of Tübingen) (until 1342) County of Lichteneck (from 1342)	Clara, Countess of Freiburg; 1340 five children	February 1369 aged 64-65	Sold Tübingen and Böblingen to Württemberg in 1342; From then on moved to his seat in Lichteneck, inherited through marriage.
Tübingen and Böblingen annexed to Württemberg
Eberhard I	c.1315? First son of Henry I and Agnes of Württemberg	June 1334 – 28 May 1383	County of Trochtelfingen	Luitgard of Berg-Schelklingen c.1335 no children Sophie of Geroldseck after 1344 two children	28 May 1383 aged 67-68	Children of Henry I, divided their inheritance.
Rudolph V	c.1315? Second son of Henry I and Agnes of Württemberg	June 1334 – 1345	County of Trochtelfingen	Unmarried	c.1345 aged 29-30	Children of Henry I, divided their inheritance.
Henry II	c.1315? Third son of Henry I and Agnes of Württemberg	June 1334 – 14 March 1370	County of Alpeck	Bertha of Kirchberg I before 1352 two children	14 March 1370 aged 54-55	Children of Henry I, divided their inheritance.
William II	c.1320 First son of William I and Kunigunde of Rappoltstein	1350 – 14 June 1374	County of Bregenz	Unknown one child Ursula of Ferrette; 1354 no children Margaret of Schaumberg; 26 March 1369 or 16 June 1373 no children	14 June 1374 aged 53-54	Children of William I, divided their inheritance. Hugo VII and Henry IV ruled in Tettnang, and William II kept Bregenz. Both Henry IV and William II associated their namesake sons to the throne.
William III	c.1340 First son of William II	c.1360 – 19 October 1368	County of Bregenz	Ursula of Hohenberg c.1367 two children	19 October 1368; Vienna aged 27-28	Children of William I, divided their inheritance. Hugo VII and Henry IV ruled in Tettnang, and William II kept Bregenz. Both Henry IV and William II associated their namesake sons to the throne.
Hugo VII	c.1320 Second son of William I and Kunigunde of Rappoltstein	1350 – 3 November 1354	County of Tettnang	Unmarried	3 November 1354 aged 33-34	Children of William I, divided their inheritance. Hugo VII and Henry IV ruled in Tettnang, and William II kept Bregenz. Both Henry IV and William II associated their namesake sons to the throne.
Henry I	c.1330 Third son of William I and Kunigunde of Rappoltstein	1350 – 1408	County of Tettnang	Adelaide of Habsburg-Laufenburg before 1370 four children Klara von Ellenbach one child	1408 aged 77-78?	Children of William I, divided their inheritance. Hugo VII and Henry IV ruled in Tettnang, and William II kept Bregenz. Both Henry IV and William II associated their namesake sons to the throne.
Henry II	c.1360 First son of Henry I and Adelaide of Habsburg-Laufenburg	c.1380? – 1395	County of Tettnang	Anna of Waldburg one child	c.1395 aged 34-35	Children of William I, divided their inheritance. Hugo VII and Henry IV ruled in Tettnang, and William II kept Bregenz. Both Henry IV and William II associated their namesake sons to the throne.
Regency of Agnes of Montfort-Feldkirch and Rudolph IV, Count of Sargans (1354-1363)						Sons of Hartmann II, ruled jointly. Henry died with no children, and the county passed to another branch of the family.
Rudolph VI	c.1344 First son of Hartmann II and Agnes of Montfort-Feldkirch	27 August 1354 – 7 July 1367	County of Vaduz	Unmarried	7 July 1367; Rhodes aged 21-22	Sons of Hartmann II, ruled jointly. Henry died with no children, and the county passed to another branch of the family.
Henry III	c.1345 Second son of Hartmann II and Agnes of Montfort-Feldkirch	27 August 1354 – 23 January 1397	County of Vaduz	Catharina of Werdenberg-Bludenz before 1395 no children	23 January 1397 aged 51-52	Sons of Hartmann II, ruled jointly. Henry died with no children, and the county passed to another branch of the family.
John I	c.1340 Son of Rudolph IV and Ursula of Vaz	March 1361 – 1396	County of Sargans	Anna of Rhazuns I 5 April 1367 one child	16 October 1400 aged 59-60	In 1396, highly endebted, John pawned Sargans to the Habsburgs, who resold it to the Counts of Toggenburg.
In 1396 Sargans was annexed to the County of Toggenburg
Albert II the Younger	c.1310 Son of Albert I and Catherine of Habsburg-Kyburg	1365 – 1372	County of Heiligenberg (with Werdenberg)	Matilda of Montfort-Tettnang c.1325 one child Agnes of Nuremberg; 3 August 1343 five children	1372 aged 61-62	
Conrad II	c.1350 Son of Godfrey II and Clara, Countess of Freiburg	February 1369 – 1 October 1410	County of Lichteneck	Catherine de Fauconnais no children Anna of Yusenberg (d.1400) no children Verena Malterer (d.1430); 14 July 1401 one child	1 October 1410 aged 59-60	
Henry IV	c.1350 Son of Henry II and Bertha of Kirchberg I	14 March 1370 – 1383	County of Alpeck	Elisabeth of Oettingen two children Agnes of Helfenstein no children	c.1390 aged 39-40	In 1383 sold his county to the city of Ulm.
In 1383 Alpeck was annexed to Ulm
Hugo IV	c.1330 Son of Albert II and Matilda of Montfort-Tettnang	1372 – 1390	County of Rheineck	Bertha of Kirchberg II c.1375 four children	c.1390 aged 59-60	Children of Albert II, divided their inheritance. Albert III sold, in 1394, his lands to the Habsburgs. In 1402, Albert IV's lands were pawned to his cousins, the Counts of Montfort. Henry and Hugo possibly ruled jointly in Rheineck.
Henry V	c.1345 First son of Albert II and Agnes of Nuremberg	1372 – 1393	County of Rheineck	Anna of Montfort-Feldkirch c.1375 four children	1393 aged 47-48	Children of Albert II, divided their inheritance. Albert III sold, in 1394, his lands to the Habsburgs. In 1402, Albert IV's lands were pawned to his cousins, the Counts of Montfort. Henry and Hugo possibly ruled jointly in Rheineck.
Albert III the Elder	c.1345 Second son of Albert II and Agnes of Nuremberg	1372 – 1394	County of Heiligenberg (at Bludenz)	Ursula of Schaunberg c.1383 six children	23 February 1420; Bludenz aged 74-75	Children of Albert II, divided their inheritance. Albert III sold, in 1394, his lands to the Habsburgs. In 1402, Albert IV's lands were pawned to his cousins, the Counts of Montfort. Henry and Hugo possibly ruled jointly in Rheineck.
Albert IV the Younger	c.1345 Third son of Albert II and Agnes of Nuremberg	1372 – 1402	County of Heiligenberg (at Heiligenberg proper, with Werdenberg)	Agnes of Montfort-Bregenz c.1380 no children	May 1418 aged 72-73	Children of Albert II, divided their inheritance. Albert III sold, in 1394, his lands to the Habsburgs. In 1402, Albert IV's lands were pawned to his cousins, the Counts of Montfort. Henry and Hugo possibly ruled jointly in Rheineck.
In 1394, Bludenz was annexed to Austria; In 1402, Werdenberg was annexed to Montfort, and in 1485 to Switzerland, while Heiligenberg fell to the Trochtelfingen branch
Conrad	c.1340 Second son of William II	14 June 1374 – 20 December 1387	County of Bregenz	Agnes of Montfort-Feldkirch two children	20 December 1387 aged 46-47	Children of William II and brothers of William III, divided the inheritance of their grandfather. Through his marriage, Conrad became son-in-law of Hugo VI of Feldkirch. Hugo was also a minnesinger (troubadour).
Hugo VIII	1357; Son of William II and Ursula of Ferrette	14 June 1374 – 4 April 1423	County of Pfannberg	Margaret of Pfannberg c.1373 one child Clementia of Toggenburg before 1401 no children Anna of Neuhaus before 1426 one child	4 April 1423 aged 65-66	Children of William II and brothers of William III, divided the inheritance of their grandfather. Through his marriage, Conrad became son-in-law of Hugo VI of Feldkirch. Hugo was also a minnesinger (troubadour).
Rudolph V the Younger	c.1330 Second son of Rudolph IV and Anna of Berg-Schelkingen	13 March – May 1375	County of Feldkirch	Agnes of Mätsch (d.1422) c.1370 no children	16 November 1390 aged 59-60	In 1375 sold the county to the Habsburgs.
In 1375, Feldkirch was sold to the Archduchy of Austria
Conrad III	c.1320 First son of Conrad I and Margaretha Speth von Faymingen	1377 – 1382	County of Herrenberg	Verena of Fürstenberg-Baar (1348-c.1395); 23 April 1370 seven children	1391 aged 70-71	In 1382, sold Herrenberg to Württemberg.
Herrenberg annexed to Württemberg
Henry VI	c.1360? Son of Eberhard I and Sophie of Geroldseck	28 May 1383 – 26 January 1397	County of Trochtelfingen	Agnes of Teck (d.23 April 1386); 1370 one child Ida of Toggenburg (d. 26 January 1399) before 1392 no children	26 January 1397; Feldkirch aged 32-33	
William IV	c.1370 Son of Conrad and Agnes of Montfort-Feldkirch	20 December 1387 – 6 March 1422	County of Bregenz	Kunigunde of Toggenburg; September/October 1387 one child	6 March 1422 aged 51-52	
Hugo V	c.1380 First son of Henry V and Anna of Montfort-Feldkirch	1392 – 1395	County of Rheineck	Agnes of Abensberg (d. 15 July 1468) c.1399 no children	December 1428 aged 47-48	Children of Henry V, ruled jointly, but the trio lost their lands to the Habsburgs in 1395. However, Hugo was able to recover power by inheriting his cousins' county of Vaduz. However, this county was also lost, in 1416, to the Lords of Brandis.
Hugo V	c.1380 First son of Henry V and Anna of Montfort-Feldkirch	23 January 1397 – 1416	County of Vaduz	Agnes of Abensberg (d. 15 July 1468) c.1399 no children	December 1428 aged 47-48	Children of Henry V, ruled jointly, but the trio lost their lands to the Habsburgs in 1395. However, Hugo was able to recover power by inheriting his cousins' county of Vaduz. However, this county was also lost, in 1416, to the Lords of Brandis.
Rudolph VII	c.1388 Second son of Henry V and Anna of Montfort-Feldkirch	1392 – 1395	County of Rheineck	Beatrix of Fürstenberg-Haslach c.1399 no children	c.1419 aged 30-31	Children of Henry V, ruled jointly, but the trio lost their lands to the Habsburgs in 1395. However, Hugo was able to recover power by inheriting his cousins' county of Vaduz. However, this county was also lost, in 1416, to the Lords of Brandis.
In 1395 Rheineck was annexed to Austria
In 1416 Vaduz was annexed to the Lordship of Brandis, and, after many inheritances, eventually became part of Liechtenstein in 1699.
Eberhard II	c.1370? Son of Henry VI and Agnes of Teck	26 January 1397 – 26 August 1416	County of Trochtelfingen	Anna of Zimmern (d. 1 March 1445); 16 November 1402 six children	26 August 1416 aged 45-46	
William V	c.1360 Second son of Henry IV and Adelaide of Habsburg-Laufenburg	1408 – 20 June 1439	County of Tettnang	Kunigunde of Werdenberg-Bludenz (d. 6 November 1443); 11 October 1412 eight children	20 June 1439 aged 78-79	Sons of Henry I, ruled jointly.
Rudolph VI	c.1360 Third son of Henry IV and Adelaide of Habsburg-Laufenburg	1408 – 8 December 1425	County of Tettnang	Unmarried	8 December 1425 aged 64-65	Sons of Henry I, ruled jointly.
Conrad IV	1402? Son of Conrad III and Verena Malterer	1 October 1410 – 18 May 1453	County of Lichteneck	Anna of Lupfen-Stühlingen; 21 May 1430 five children	18 May 1453 aged 64-65	
Henry VII	c.1400? First son of Eberhard II and Anna of Zimmern	30 August 1416 – 7 March 1441	County of Trochtelfingen	Unmarried	7 March 1441 aged 40-41	Children of Eberhard III, ruled jointly.
John II	c.1400? Second son of Eberhard II and Anna of Zimmern	30 August 1416 – 27 April 1465	County of Trochtelfingen	Elisabeth of Württemberg; 1430 seven children	27 April 1465 aged 64-65	Children of Eberhard III, ruled jointly.
Eberhard IV	c.1400? Third son of Eberhard II and Anna of Zimmern	30 August 1416 – 23 April 1450	County of Trochtelfingen	Unmarried	23 April 1450 aged 49-50	Children of Eberhard III, ruled jointly.
Elisabeth	c.1390 Bregenz; Daughter of William IV and Kunigunde of Toggenburg	6 March 1422 – 4 June 1458	County of Bregenz (from 1451 in the northern part only)	Eberhard of Nellenburg c.1413 one child William, Margrave of Hachberg-Sausenberg; 17 August 1422 or 23 February 1424 (annulled 1436) two children	4 June 1458; Konstanz aged 67-68	Last countess of Bregenz. In 1451 she sold part of the county to Austria. The remaining was inherited by her cousins from Pfannberg.
In 1451, half of Bregenz was sold to the Archduchy of Austria, the other part was inherited by Pfannberg
Herman I	c.1400 Son of Ulrich of Montfort and Judith of Stadeck	1423 – 1434	County of Pfannberg	Margareta of Celje; 15 March 1430 four children	1434 aged 33-34	Grandson of Hugo VIII.
Herman II	c.1420 First son of Herman I and Margareta of Celje	1434 – 1482	County of Pfannberg	Cecilia of Liechtenstein-Murau; 1462 five children	1482 aged 61-62	Sons of Herman I, ruled jointly.
John II	c.1420 Second son of Herman I and Margareta of Celje	1434 – April 1469	County of Pfannberg	A woman from the Sternberg family no children	April 1469 aged 48-49	Sons of Herman I, ruled jointly.
George I	c.1420 Third son of Herman I and Margareta of Celje	1434 – 1447	County of Pfannberg	Unmarried	1447 aged 26-27	Sons of Herman I, ruled jointly.
In 1436, with the extinction of the Toggenburgs, Sargans returned to Werdenberg family.
Henry VIII	c.1385 Son of John I and Anna of Rhazuns I	1436 – 1447	County of Sargans	Agnes of Matsch c.1440 four children	1447 aged	In 1436, following the extinction of the Toggenburgs, and of the mortgage that bound the county of Sargans to them, the county was restored to the original family.
Henry III	c.1415 First son of William V and Kunigunde of Werdenberg-Bludenz	20 June 1439 – 23 November 1444	County of Werdenberg	Unknown one child	23 November 1444 aged 38-39	Children of William V, divided their inheritance.
Ulrich IV the Elder	c.1415 Second son of William V and Kunigunde of Werdenberg-Bludenz	20 June 1439 – 29 September 1495	County of Tettnang	Ursula of Hachberg; 28 June 1467 one child	29 September 1495 aged 79-80	Children of William V, divided their inheritance.
Rudolph VII	c.1415 Third son of William V and Kunigunde of Werdenberg-Bludenz	20 June 1439 – 11 December 1445	County of Tettnang	Beatrice of Helfenstein no children	11 December 1445 aged 29-30	Children of William V, divided their inheritance.
Hugo IX	c.1420 Fourth son of William V and Kunigunde of Werdenberg-Bludenz	20 June 1439 – 16 October 1491	County of Rothenfels	Elisabeth of Werdenberg-Heiligenberg before 1462 one child Elisabeth of Hohenlohe (d.24 December 1488)before 1488 one child	16 October 1491 aged 70-71	Children of William V, divided their inheritance.
William VI	c.1435 Son of Henry VI	23 November 1444 – 5 February 1483	County of Werdenberg	Clementia von Hewen two children	5 February 1483 aged 47-48	Left no descendants. Werdenberg merged in Rothenfels.
In 1483 Werdenberg was annexed by Rothenfels, and in 1485 was annexed to Switzerland.
William	c.1440? First son of Henry VIII and Agnes of Matsch	1447 – 1467	County of Sargans	Erentrude of Stauffen no children	1467 aged 26-27	Children of Henry VIII, ruled jointly. Highly indebted, George eventually sold the county to the Swiss Confederation.
George I	c.1442 Second son of Henry VIII and Agnes of Matsch	1447 – 1483	County of Sargans	Anna of Rhazuns II before 1461 no children Barbara of Waldburg-Sonnenburg; 1463 (June–September) no children	23 February 1504 aged 61-62	Children of Henry VIII, ruled jointly. Highly indebted, George eventually sold the county to the Swiss Confederation.
In 1483 Sargans was definitely annexed to Switzerland
George I	c.1445 First son of Conrad IV and Anna of Lupfen-Stühlingen	18 May 1453 – 1507	County of Lichteneck	Agatha of Arco three children	1507 aged 61-62	Children of Conrad IV, ruled jointly.
Conrad V	1449; Second son of Conrad IV and Anna of Lupfen-Stühlingen	18 May 1453 – 1506	County of Lichteneck	Unmarried	1506 aged 56-57	Children of Conrad IV, ruled jointly.
George II	c.1440? First son of John II and Elisabeth of Württemberg	27 April 1465 – 12 March 1500	County of Trochtelfingen (at Trochtelfingen proper)	Catharina of Baden; 19 May 1464 seven children	12 March 1500 aged 59-60	Children of John II, divided their inheritance, which all returned to the main line after Hugo and Ulrich's deaths with no descendants.
Hugo VI	c.1440? Second son of John II and Elisabeth of Württemberg	27 April 1465 – 8 August 1508	County of Trochtelfingen (at Sigmaringen)	Unmarried	8 August 1508 aged 67-68	Children of John II, divided their inheritance, which all returned to the main line after Hugo and Ulrich's deaths with no descendants.
Ulrich	c.1440? Third son of John II and Elisabeth of Württemberg	27 April 1465 – 17 July 1503	County of Trochtelfingen (at Heiligenberg and Vaihingen)	Unmarried	17 July 1503 aged 62-63	Children of John II, divided their inheritance, which all returned to the main line after Hugo and Ulrich's deaths with no descendants.
Hugo X	c.1470? First son of Herman II and Cecilia of Liechtenstein-Murau	1482 – 1523	County of Bregenz	Veronica of Waldburg no children	22 July 1536; Höchstedt aged 65-66	Children of Herman II, divided their inheritance. In 1523, Hugo X sold his part (the half county of Bregenz) to Austria. George apparently changed seat, in 1524, from Pfannberg to Peggau.
George II	c.1470? Second son of Herman II and Cecilia of Liechtenstein-Murau	1482 – 30 May 1544	County of Pfannberg (until 1524) County of Peggau (from 1544)	Unknown one child Catherine of Poland after 1522 one child	30 May 1544; Bregenz aged 65-66	Children of Herman II, divided their inheritance. In 1523, Hugo X sold his part (the half county of Bregenz) to Austria. George apparently changed seat, in 1524, from Pfannberg to Peggau.
In 1523 the remaining half of Bregenz was sold to the Archduchy of Austria.
John IV	c.1460 Son of Hugo IX and Elisabeth of Werdenberg-Heiligenberg	16 October 1491 – 19 September 1529	County of Rothenfels	Apollonia of Kirchberg before 1518 no children Magdalena of Oettingen-Wallerstein; 23 June 1524 no children	19 September 1529 aged 68-69	Half-brothers, ruled jointly.
Hugo XI	c.1460 Son of Hugo IX and Elisabeth of Hohenlohe	16 October 1491 – 24 April 1519	County of Rothenfels	Anna of the Palatinate-Zweibrücken-Bitsch four children	24 April 1519 aged 58-59	Half-brothers, ruled jointly.
Ulrich V the Younger	c.1440 Son of Ulrich IV and Ursula of Hachberg	29 September 1495 – 23 April 1520	County of Tettnang	Magdalena of Oettingen-Wallerstein; 24 February 1485 no children	23 April 1520 aged 79-80	Left no surviving descendants. Tettnang was inherited by his wife.
Regency of Rudolf of Blumeneck and Sebastian of Blumeneck (1507-1514)						Children of George I, ruled jointly. The regents renewed claimancies to previously annexed Tübingen estates to Wurttemberg.
Conrad VI	c.1500 First son of George I and Agatha of Arco	1507 – 1569	County of Lichteneck	Johanna of the Palatinate-Zweibrücken-Bitsch (10 June 1517 - c.1535); 6 December 1532 one child Catharina of Waldburg-Zeil (2 February 1522 - c.1575) c.1535 one child	February 1369 aged 54-55	Children of George I, ruled jointly. The regents renewed claimancies to previously annexed Tübingen estates to Wurttemberg.
George II	c.1500 Second son of George I and Agatha of Arco	1507 – 1536	County of Lichteneck	Unmarried	1536 aged 35-36	Children of George I, ruled jointly. The regents renewed claimancies to previously annexed Tübingen estates to Wurttemberg.
John III	c.1480 First son of George II and Catharina of Baden	8 August 1508 – 8 July 1522	County of Trochtelfingen	Catharina of Gundelfingen no children	8 July 1522 aged 41-42	Sons of George II, ruled jointly. Felix abdicated of his inheritance in 1510, which went to his brother Christoph.
Christoph	c.1480 Second son of George II and Catharina of Baden	8 August 1508 – 29 January 1534	County of Trochtelfingen	Eleonora Gonzaga; 3 March 1500 one child Johanna van Witthem (d. 19 August 1544); 20 August 1526 no children	29 January 1534; Sigmaringen aged 53-54	Sons of George II, ruled jointly. Felix abdicated of his inheritance in 1510, which went to his brother Christoph.
Felix	c.1480 Third son of George II and Catharina of Baden	8 August 1508 – 1510	County of Trochtelfingen	Elisabeth of Neuchâtel (1485 - 20 November 1533); 18 May 1505; Trier no children	12 July 1530; Augsburg aged 49-50	Sons of George II, ruled jointly. Felix abdicated of his inheritance in 1510, which went to his brother Christoph.
Magdalena of Oettingen-Wallerstein	August 1473; Daughter of Louis "XIII" (X), Count of Oettingen and Eva of Schwarzenberg-Hohenlandsberg	23 April 1520 – 22 April 1525	County of Tettnang	Ulrich V, Count of Tettnang; 24 February 1485 no children John IV, Count of Rothenfels; 23 June 1524 no children	22 April 1525 aged 51	Widow of Ulrich V, held the position of regent. She ruled Tettnang for apparently five years (until her death). Her second marriage to the Count of Rothenfels (cousin of her first husband) determined, after her death, the enfeoffment of Tettnang to this branch of the family by Charles V, Holy Roman Emperor.
In 1525 Tettnang was enfeoffed to Rothenfels.
Wolfgang I	c.1490 First son of Hugo XI and Anna of the Palatinate-Zweibrücken-Bitsch	19 September 1529 – 21 March 1541	County of Rothenfels	Eleonore of Wolfstein before 1523 no children	21 March 1541 aged 50-51	Sons of Hugo XI, ruled jointly.
John V	c.1490 Second son of Hugo XI and Anna of the Palatinate-Zweibrücken-Bitsch	19 September 1529 – 1547	County of Rothenfels	Jeanne d'Arenberg c.1535 no children	1547; Riedlingen aged 56-57	Sons of Hugo XI, ruled jointly.
Hugo XII	c.1500 Third son of Hugo XI and Anna of the Palatinate-Zweibrücken-Bitsch	19 September 1529 – 21 November 1564	County of Rothenfels	Maria Magdalena of Schwarzenberg before 1543 six children	21 November 1564 aged 56-57	Sons of Hugo XI, ruled jointly.
Anna	1500; Daughter of Christoph and Eleonora Gonzaga	29 January 1534 – 1554	County of Trochtelfingen	Frederick II, Count of Fürstenberg; 19 February 1516; Ortenberg sixteen children	1554 aged 53-54	After Christoph's death, the county was divided; Anna retained the main county of Trochtelfingen and other possessions, but others, like Sigmaringen, were annexed to Austria, and, in the next year, to the House of Hohenzollern.
In 1534 Trochtelfingen became divided between Fürstenberg and Austria; the Austrian part was annexed to Hohenzollern in the following year.
Jacob	c.1530 Son of George II and Catherine of Poland	1544-3 May 1572	County of Peggau	Catharina Fugger; 9 February 1553 five children	3 May 1572; Bregenz aged 41-42	
Ulrich VI	c.1530 Son of Hugo XII and Maria Magdalena of Schwarzenberg	21 November 1564 – 6 April 1575	County of Rothenfels	Ursula of Solms-Lich; 1559 two children	6 April 1575 aged 44-45	After his death, the county was annexed by the Barony of Konigsegg, depriving Ulrich's sons from succession.
In 1575 Rothenfels was annexed by the Barony of Königsegg.
George III	c.1535 Son of Conrad VI and Catharina of Waldburg-Zeil	1569 – 7 February 1570	County of Lichteneck	Walpurga of Erbach; 14 November 1564 five children	7 February 1570; Waldenburg aged 34-35	Died in a fire in Waldenburg Castle.
Regency of Walpurga of Erbach (1570-1574)						
Eberhard II	c.1560 Son of George III and Walpurga of Erbach	7 February 1570 – 12 September 1608	County of Lichteneck	Elisabeth Schenk of Limpurg-Speckfeld (30 August 1578 - 11 January 1632); 11 January 1597 four children	12 September 1608 aged 47-48	
John VI	c.1557 First son of Jacob and Catharina Fugger	3 May 1572 – 21 February 1619	County of Peggau	Sybilla Fugger; 4 October 1587; Augsburg three children	21 February 1619 aged 61-62	Sons of Jacob, ruled jointly.
George III	c.1560 Second son of Jacob and Catharina Fugger	3 May 1572 – 1590	County of Peggau	Anna von Lobkowicz; November 1584 no children	1590 aged 29-30	Sons of Jacob, ruled jointly.
Wolfgang II	c.1560 Third son of Jacob and Catharina Fugger	3 May 1572 – 1596	County of Peggau	Unmarried	1596 aged 35-36	Sons of Jacob, ruled jointly.
Anton I	c.1560 Fourth son of Jacob and Catharina Fugger	3 May 1572 – 1595	County of Peggau	Unmarried	1595 aged 34-35	Sons of Jacob, ruled jointly.
Regency of Elisabeth Schenk of Limpurg-Speckfeld (1608-1615)						Children of Eberhard, ruled jointly.
George Frederick	18 March 1601; First son of Eberhard II and Elisabeth Schenk of Limpurg-Speckfeld	12 September 1608 – 26 April 1622	County of Lichteneck	Unmarried	26 April 1622 aged 20-21	Children of Eberhard, ruled jointly.
George Eberhard	1604; Second son of Eberhard II and Elisabeth Schenk of Limpurg-Speckfeld	12 September 1608 – 16 December 1634	County of Lichteneck	Unmarried	16 December 1634 aged 29-30	Children of Eberhard, ruled jointly.
Conrad William	1605; Third son of Eberhard II and Elisabeth Schenk of Limpurg-Speckfeld	12 September 1608 – 10 February 1630	County of Lichteneck	Anastasia of Leiningen (1588–1656); 25 April 1624 five children	10 February 1630 aged 24-25	Children of Eberhard, ruled jointly.
Hugo XIII	1 April 1599; First son of John VI and Sibylla Fugger	21 February 1619 – 2 July 1662	County of Peggau	Johanna Euphroysne of Waldburg; 7 October 1618; Wolfegg four children	2 July 1662 aged 63	Sons of John VI, ruled jointly.
Herman III	c.1600 Second son of John VI and Sibylla Fugger	21 February 1619 – 1641	County of Peggau	Unmarried	1641 aged 40-41	Sons of John VI, ruled jointly.
John VII	c.1600 Third son of John VI and Sibylla Fugger	21 February 1619 – 1623	County of Peggau	Unmarried	1623 aged 22-23	Sons of John VI, ruled jointly.
Regency of Anastasia of Leiningen (1634-1637)						Sold Lichteneck to Württemberg in 1664.
Elisabeth Bernhardine	11 October 1624; Daughter of Conrad William and Anastasia of Leiningen	16 December 1634 – 1664	County of Lichteneck	Charles, Count of Salm-Neuburg; 26 November 1637 ten children	4 November 1666 aged 42	Sold Lichteneck to Württemberg in 1664.
Lichteneck annexed to Württemberg
John VIII	25 November 1627; First son of Hugo XIII and Johanna Euphroysne of Waldburg	2 July 1662 – 12 September 1686	County of Peggau	Anna Eusebia of Königsegg; 1655 one child Maria Katharina of Sulz; 12 August 1658 two children	12 September 1686; Langenargen aged 58	Sons of Hugo XIII, ruled jointly.
Anton II the Elder	14 October 1635; Second son of Hugo XIII and Johanna Euphroysne of Waldburg	2 July 1662 – 15 June 1706	County of Peggau	Maria Victoria of Spauer-Flavon; 1670 two children	15 June 1706; Ingolstadt aged 70	Sons of Hugo XIII, ruled jointly.
Anton III the Younger	26 November 1670; Tettnang; Son of John VIII and Maria Katharina of Sulz	15 June 1706 – 17 December 1733	County of Peggau	Maria Anna of Thun-Hohenstein; 16 May 1693 two children	17 December 1733; Salzburg aged 63	Anton III, son of John VIII, shared rule with his cousin Sebastian, son of Anton II.
Sebastian	7 October 1684; Son of Anton II and Maria Victoria of Spauer-Flavon	15 June 1706 – 6 February 1728	County of Peggau	Unmarried	6 February 1728 aged 43	Anton III, son of John VIII, shared rule with his cousin Sebastian, son of Anton II.
Maximilian Joseph Ernest	20 January 1700; Salzburg; Son of Anton III and Maria Anna of Thun-Hohenstein	17 December 1733 – 17 March 1759	County of Peggau	Maria Antonia of Waldburg; 26 January 1722 one child	17 March 1759; Tettnang aged 59	
Francis Xavier	3 November 1722; Son of Maximilian Joseph Ernest and Maria Antonia of Waldburg	17 March 1759 – 24 March 1780	County of Peggau	Maria Josefa von Königsegg-Aulendorf (10 July 1730 - 24 July 1753) Sophia Theresa Maximiliane of Limburg-Bronkhorst (5 April 1740 - 15 November 1769); 1 December 1758 no children	24 March 1780; Eriskirch aged 57	Indebted, he was forced to sell his county to Austria.
In 1780, Peggau was sold to the Archduchy of Austria

== Genealogy ==
Note: The following lists have been simplified. It does not include persons who died young or who otherwise had no impact on the overall course of the family's history.

1. Hugo I of Tübingen (= Hugo V of Nagold), (†ca. 1152), shortly before 1146 promoted to Count Palatine of Swabia, ∞ Hemma of Zollern, daughter of Frederick I, Count of Zollern
  1. Frederick, Count Palatine of Tübingen, 1152-1162
  2. Hugo II (1115–1182), Count Palatine of Tübingen 1152–1182, ∞ Elizabeth, Countess of Bregenz, heir to Bregenz, Montfort, and Sigmaringen; daughter of Rudolph I, Count of Bregenz
    1. Rudolph I (1160–1219), Count Palatine of Tübingen 1182–1219; founded Bebenhausen Abbey in 1183; ∞ Matilda, Countess of Gleiburg, heir of Gießen
      1. Rudolph II (†1247), Count Palatine of Tübingen, Vogt of Sindelfingen
        1. Hugo IV (†1267), Count Palatine of Tübingen, Count of Horb, founder of the Horb line
          1. Rudolph (*1259; †1280), member of the Teutonic Order
          2. Ludwig, Count of Horb; after his death, Horb was acquired by the Counts of Hohenberg via marriage to his sister
          3. Liutgard ∞ Burkhard IV of Hohenberg
        2. Rudolph I "der Scheerer" (†1277), Count of Tübingen in Herrenberg, founder of the Herrenberg line
          Tübingen-Herrenberg
          1. Eberhard (†1304), Count Palatine of Tübingen; sold Tübingen to the Böblingen line in 1294
          2. Rudolph II "der Scheerer" (†1317), Count of Tübingen in Herrenberg
            1. According to some sources, Conrad I "der Scheerer" (†1376), Count of Herrenberg
              1. Conrad II (†1391), Count of Herrenberg; sold Herrenberg to Württemberg in 1382
                1. Anastasia of Tübingen, abbess of St. Margarethen Abbey in Waldkirch
                  Tübingen-Asperg
      2. William (†1252), Count of Asperg-Gießen-Böblingen (the "Asperg Line")
        1. Rudolph IV (†1271), Count of Böblingen
          1. Gottfried I (†1316), Count of Böblingen, Count Palatine of Tübingen, ∞ Elizabeth of Fürstenberg
            1. William (†1327), Count Palatine of Tübingen
              1. Gottfried II (†1369), Count Palatine of Tübingen; sold Tübingen to Württemberg in 1342; inherited Lichteneck via his wife, founding the Tübingen-Lichteneck line (see below)
            2. Agnes ∞ Ulrich of Rechberg The Elder
        2. Ulrich I (†1283), Count of Asperg; sold Gießen to the Landgraves of Hesse in 1264
          1. Ulrich II (†1341), Count of Beilstein; sold Asperg to Württemberg in 1340; ∞ Anna, Countess of Löwenstein, heir of Beilstein
            1. William (†1357); sold Beilstein to Württemberg in 1340
    2. Hugo III of Tübingen (Hugo I of Montfort, 1185–1228/30), Count of Bregenz and Montfort, founder of the Montfort Line, from which arose the Werdenberg Line
  3. Henry of Tübingen (* ca. 1118, †7 April 1167 in an epidemic in Italy)

=== Tübingen-Lichteneck Line ===
1. Gottfried II (†1369), Count Palatine of Tübingen, sold Tübingen to Württemberg in 1342, but retained the title of "Count of Tübingen"; via his marriage to Clara of Freiburg, he would become lord of Lichteneck
  1. Conrad I (†1414), Count of Lichteneck
    1. Margaretha ∞ Hesso, Margrave of Baden
    2. Conrad II (†1449), Count of Lichteneck
    3. Rudolf "of Scheer" (*1414)
      1. Conrad [III] (†1477), Count of Lichteneck; ∞ Anna, Countess of Lupfen
        1. George I (†1507), Count of Tübingen, Lord of Lichteneck
          1. Conrad III (†1569), Count of Tübingen, Lord of Lichteneck
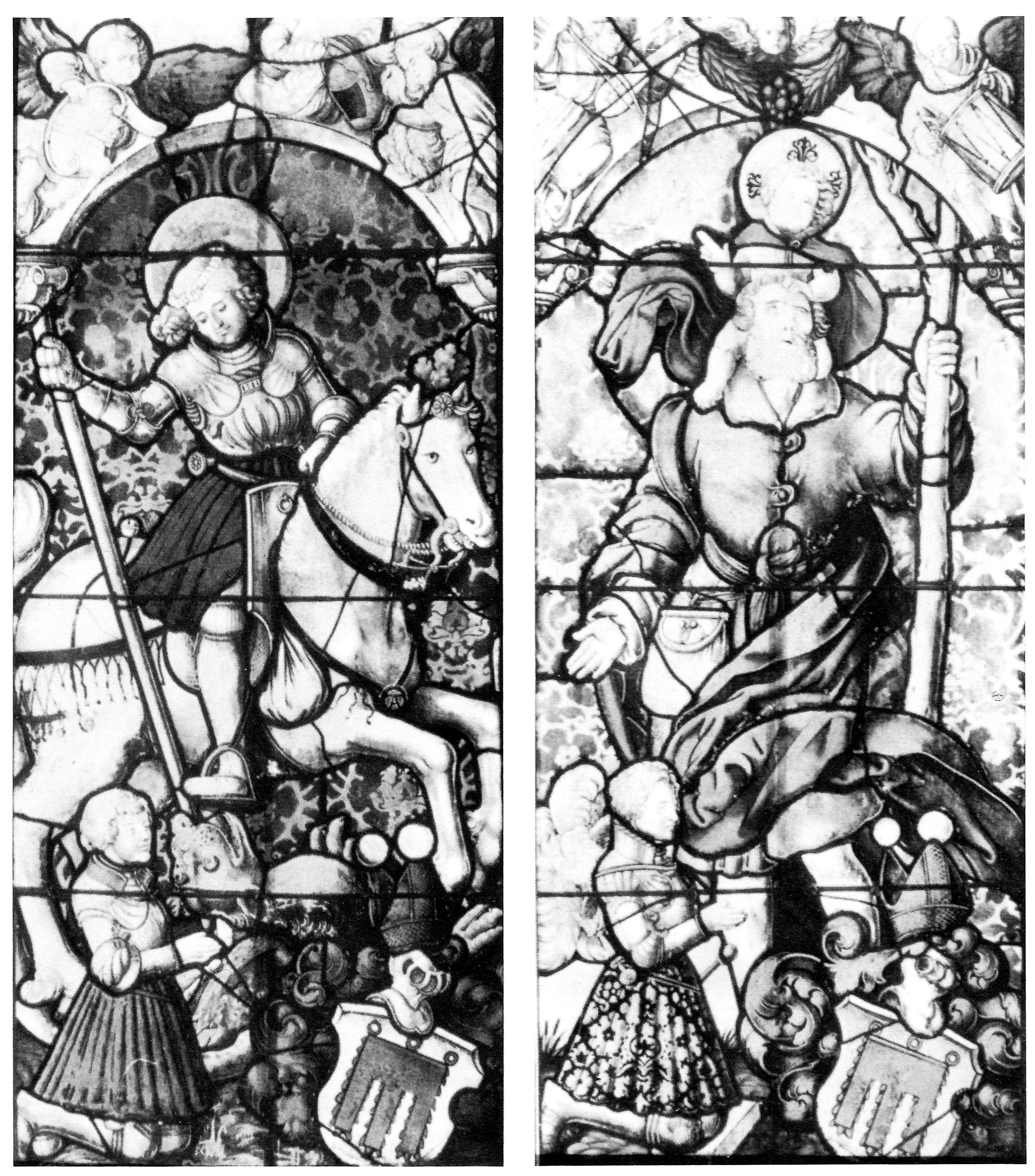
            Counts George II and Conrad IV of Tübingen, Lords of Lichteneck
            1. Conrad IV (†1569), Count of Tübingen, Lord of Lichteneck; after 1536 Lord of Lichteneck and Limburg
              1. Agathe, Countess of Tübingen, ∞ Eberhard, Count of Hohenlohe († 5 March 1570)
              2. George III (†1570 in a fire at Waldenburg Castle during Carnival), Count of Lichteneck, ∞ Walpurg, Countess of Erbach
                1. Eberhard (*1573, †14 September 1608), Count of Lichteneck, Councillor for the Duchy of Württemberg; starting in 1587, Obervogt of the Black Forest
                  1. George Eberhard († 9 September 1631), Count of Lichteneck
                  2. Conrad William (†1630), Count of Tübingen-Lichteneck
                    1. Elizabeth Bernhardine (*11 October 1624; † 4 November 1666) ∞ Charles, Count of Salmburg-Neuburg, who would inherit Lichteneck and then sell it in 1664
                2. Albericus (*1573, †25 October 1592 – killed by guards in Strasbourg)
            2. George II, Count of Tübingen (died unmarried)
          2. Henry, Teutonic Knight
          3. John, Teutonic Knight
          4. Margaret, abbess of Buchau (*1496)

== Bibliography ==
- Ludwig Schmid: Geschichte der Pfalzgrafen von Tübingen, nach meist ungedruckten Quellen, nebst Urkundenbuch. Ein Beitrag zur schwäbischen und deutschen Geschichte [History of the Counts Palatine of Tübingen : according to mostly unprinted sources and historic documents; a contribution to Swabianand German history]. Bavarian State Library: Fues, Tübingen 1853 .
- Gerhard Köbler: Historisches Lexikon der deutschen Länder 2nd ed., Beck, München 1989.
- Decker-Hauff, Hansmartin / Quarthal, Franz [eds.]: Die Pfalzgrafen von Tübingen. Städtepolitik - Pfalzgrafenamt - Adelsherrschaft im Breisgau, Sigmaringen 1981.
