= Rudolf II of Tübingen =

Rudolph II, Count Palatine of Tübingen
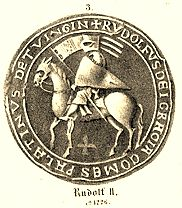
- Rudolph II of Tübingen
- Died: 1 November 1247
- Noble family: House of Nagold
- Spouse: a daughter of Margrave Henry of Ronsberg
- Father: Rudolph I, Count Palatine of Tübingen
- Mother: Matilda of Gleiberg

Rudolph II, Count Palatine of Tübingen (died 1 November 1247) was Count Palatine of Tübingen and Vogt of Sindelfingen. He was the younger son of Rudolph I and his wife Matilda of Gleiberg, heiress of Giessen.

== Life ==
Rudolph II inherited the County Palatine of Tübingen when his elder brother Hugo III died in 1216. From 1224 onwards, he is described as Count Palatine in many imperial documents, while his younger brother William is merely styled as Count. Rudolph II supported Bebenhausen Abbey, which his parents had founded.

Next to his father, Rudolph II is the second most mentioned Count Palatine of Tübingen in imperial documents, mostly in documents by King Henry (VII) of Germany, the son of Emperor Frederick II, who had been elected King of Germany in 1220, at the age of 8. Frederick II spent much of his time in Italy, leaving his ancestral Swabia in the hands of his son. Later, in 1232, Henry revolted against his father and did everything in his power to win the Swabian nobility over to his side. Rudolph II appears to have been among the noblemen who sided with Henry VII, at least, he is mentioned in 10 different documents of Henry VII and never by Frederick II. Considering Rudolph's energetic character, one can assume that he intended to use the conflict between Henry VII and Frederick II to expand his own power and aim for an independent position.

Swabian noblemen, including Rudolph II and his brother William, Count Hartmann I of Württemberg and a Count of Dillingen, visited Henry VII in Worms on 8 January 1224. They met Margrave Herman V of Baden was also present, as was Eberhard, Sénéchal of Waldburg and councillor and former guardian of Henry VII in Oppenheim on 5 April 1227 and in Hagenau on 1 May. In the same year, Rudolph met Duke Louis I of Bavaria, who was an imperial vicar and Conrad of Winterstetten, who was imperial cup-bearer and also a councillor of Henry VII. He met the Lords of Neuffen and the imperial marshal Anselm of Justingen in Ulm on 23 February 1228. On 31 August 1228, Rudolph II appears, together with Margrave Herman V of Baden, Count Henry of Wirtemberg, a Count of Dillingen, Conrad of Weinsperg and the councillors mentioned above, as witnesses of a deed in which King Henry VII confirms the privileges of Adelber Abbey in Esslingen. Later that year, Rudolph II appeared as a witness in four deeds by Duke Louis I of Bavaria and Bishop Ekbert of Bamberg, together with, among others, Margrave Herman V of Baden, Count Ulrich and Eberhard of Helfenstein, Counts Eberhard and Otto of Eberstein, Count Gottfried of Hohenlohe, and two councillors.

Rudolph II stood at the head of a delegation of eight Swabian counts, among them Albert IV of Habsburg, Frederick IV of Zollern and a Count of Eberstein, at the Imperial Diet in Worms on 29 April 1231. On 22 November 1231, Rudolph II and his brother William met Counts Albert of Rottenburg, Ulrich of Hefenstein and Eberhard of Walpurg at Henry VII's castle in Ulm. On 31 December 1231, Rudolph witnessed a deed benefiting Neresheim Abbey in Wimpfen, together with Duke Conrad I of Teck and Margrave Hermann V of Baden. The last time Rudolph II witnessed a deed of Henry VII was on 4 June 1233 in Esslingen, again with his brother William.

In 1235, Pope Gregory IX called on the princes of the empire to organize a new crusade into the Holy Land, to render assistance to the beleaguered church there. Rudolph II is the only Swabian nobleman named in this call to arms; whether he actually went to the Holy Land is unknown. The fact that he is not mentioned in any deed between 1235 and 1243 suggests that he may have been absent for an extended period. In particular, no mention is made of his position in the struggle between King Conrad IV of Germany and anti-King Henry Raspe IV, which is remarkable, since this struggle took place mainly in Swabia. However, a deed in favour of Bebenhausen Abbey which the papal legate made at Rudolph II's request in the army camp outside Ulm on 28 January 1247, suggests that he supported Henry Raspe.

== Family ==
The name of Rudolph II's wife has not been preserved. She was a daughter of Margrave Henry from the House of Ronsberg and Udilhild of Gammertingen. They had the following children:

- Hugo IV, Count Palatine of Tübingen
- Rudolf III of Scheer (d. 12 May 1277), Count of Tübingen-Herrenberg
- Ulrich
- Mathilda, married Burchard II, Count of Hohenberg (d. 14 July 1253, struck by lightning). Their daughter Gertrude Anna (c. 1225 – 16 February 1281) married Emperor Rudolf I, the first Emperor from the House of Habsburg.
