= Liutgard of Saxony =

Liutgard of Saxony may refer to:

- Liutgard of Saxony (died 885) (845–885), daughter of the Saxon count Liudolf and wife of King Louis the Younger of East Francia
- Liutgard of Saxony (died 953) (932–953), daughter of King Otto I of Germany, wife of Duke Conrad the Red of Lorraine and mother of Duke Otto I of Carinthia

== See also ==
- Liutgard (disambiguation)
