= Wittichen =

- Village of Schenkenzell
- Interactive map of Wittichen
- Location within Germany Location within Baden-Württemberg
- Coordinates: 48°12′18″N 8°12′18″E
- Country: Germany
- State: Baden-Württemberg
- Municipality: Schenkenzell
- Time zone: UTC+01:00 (CET)
  - Summer (DST): UTC+02:00 (CEST)

Wittichen is a village that belongs to Kaltbrunn in the municipality of Schenkenzell in the district of Rottweil in the southwest German state of Baden-Württemberg.

== History ==
In 1291, Luitgard, later the founder of the convent of Wittichen Abbey, was born in Wittichen. The abbey was founded in 1324. In 1498 Wittichen fell into the hands of the Swabian princes of Fürstenberg. The first attempt to close the convent was in 1540. In 1643 it was destroyed and its rebuilding took until 1681. During the Napoleonic era, Wittichen was secularised in 1803 and went to the Grand Duchy of Baden in 1806.

=== Economy ===
There was mining in Wittichen for centuries.

== Sights ==
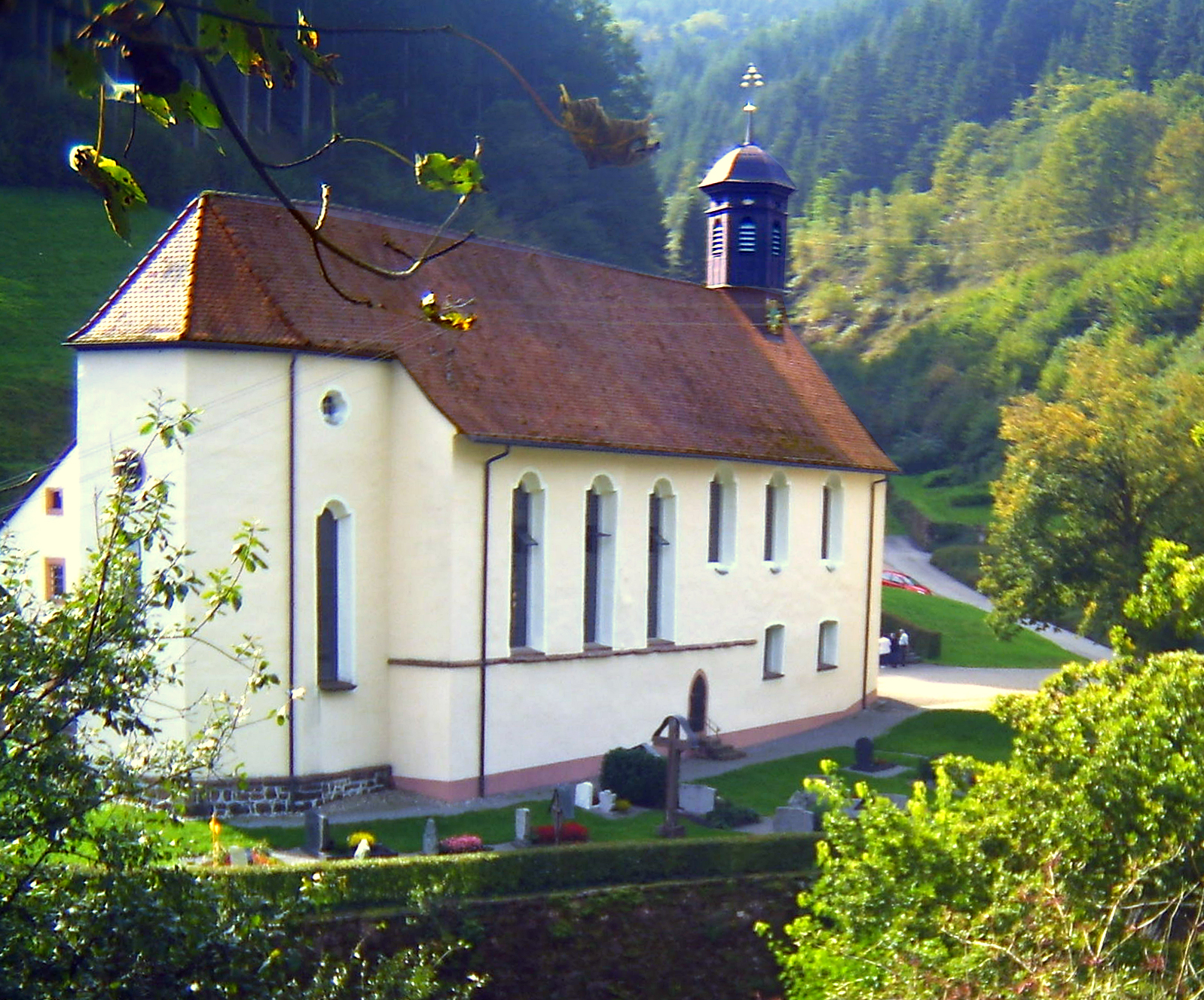
Convent church and cemetery

- Wittichen Abbey with its convent museum, exhibits on the history of the monastery and mining
- Several spoil heaps from the days of mining still exist and some are accessible
- Geological Educational Path, Wittichen

== Trails ==
- Hansjakob Way I
- Gengenbach–Alpirsbach Trail

== Events ==
On the second Sunday in October is the Luitgard Festival and statt.

== Sons and daughters of the municipality ==
- Johann Baptist Weiß (1753–1800), Benedictine monk at St. Blaise Abbey
