= Johann Weiß =

Johann Weiß may refer to:

- Johann Baptist Weiß (priest) (1753–1800), Benedictine priest, teacher and playwright
- Johann Baptist Weiss (1820–1899), German historian
- Johann Baptist Weiss (1812–1879), German painter
- Johann Baptist Weiß (1814–1850), Austrian schoolmaster, organist and early tutor of Anton Bruckner
- Johann Jacob Weiss (c. 1662–1754), composer of lute music
- Johann Sigismund Weiss, the originally attributed composer of Flute sonata in D major (HWV 378) (c. 1707)
- Johann Weiss, see Pirate Party of Canada
- Johann Weiss, Viennese lawyer and WW1 veteran, executed by Eduard Roschmann
