= Gift register =

The gift register (German: Schenkungsbuch) of an abbey or monastery was a record of the properties forming its estate, the majority of which came from gifts (Schenkungen). The register served as proof of the legitimacy of these properties and thus provided some security and protection for them. As a rule, the register comprised transcripts of the original documents, not the deed itself, as in the case of the sometimes protocular tradition books. In order to facilitate the management of the estate, documents spanning several centuries were often organised geographically. The entries were kept up-to-date over a longer period of time.

== Reichenbach Gift Register ==
The Reichenbach Gift Register (Reichenbacher Schenkungsbuch) belonging to Reichenbach Abbey in the Northern Black Forest was preserved in three volumes: first the St. Paul Manuscript (1099-1105), then the Stuttgart Manuscript (1143-1152) and finally the Wiblingen Manuscript (16th century). The latter, however, has been missing since 1963. The original text, which was not preserved, was probably written by the time of Abbot William (died 1091).

== Gift register of Lorsch Abbey ==
Like those at Fulda, documents about the estates of the imperial abbey of Lorsch have survived dating as far back as the 8th century. The Lorsch Codex compiled in the 12th century contains the names of more than 1000 places, which are mentioned for the first time.

Among the place first recorded in the Codex are Sersheim, Lohra, Neckargröningen, now part of Remseck am Neckar, Mannheim and Nauheim.

== Gift register of Hirsau Abbey ==
The Codex Hirsaugiensis was created as an edited version of the Traditiones Hirsaugenses tradition, in order to enable a systematic access to the monastery's documents. Personalities mentioned in the Hirsau gift register include Conrad I of Württemberg.

== Literature ==
- Stephan Molitor: Das Reichenbacher Schenkungsbuch (= Veröffentlichungen der Kommission für Geschichtliche Landeskunde in Baden-Württemberg. Reihe A: Quellen. Bd. 40). Kohlhammer, Stuttgart, 1997, ISBN 3-17-013148-6 (zugl. Diss. Univ. Freiburg i. Br. 1986).

== See also ==
- Cartulary
- Tradition book
