= Rudolf III of Montfort =

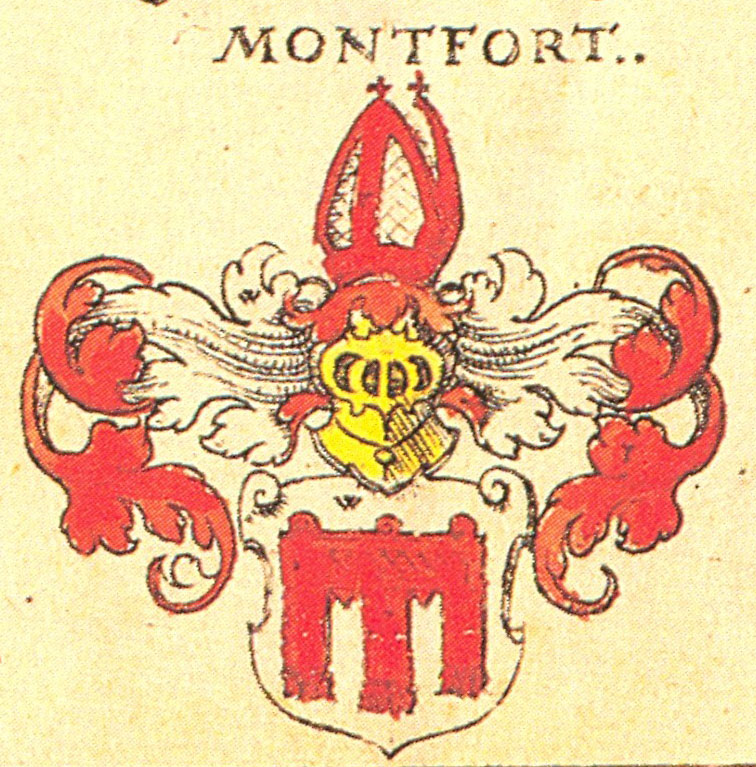
Arms of the Counts of Montfort

Rudolf III von Montfort (born between 1260 and 1275; died 27 or 28 March 1334 in Arbon) was bishop of Chur (1322–1325) and Konstanz (1322–1334). He was born into the young family of Montfort-Feldkirch of the Swabian noble family of Montfort.

== Life ==
=== Family ===
Rudolf was the son of Rudolf II († 1302), Count of Montfort-Feldkirch, a collateral line of the County palatines of Tübingen. His mother was Agnes von Grüningen, daughter of Count Hartmann II von Grüningen. In 1303, he studied law in Bologna. After the early death of their brother Hugo IV († 1310), Rudolf and his younger brother Ulrich II – himself a cleric († 1350) – became regents for their underage nephews. Rudolf's sister Elisabeth was married to the Steward Eberhard von Waldburg.

=== Spiritual and Political Works ===
Rudolf's clerical career was largely similar to his uncle Friedrich von Montfort's († 1290): He became canon in 1283 and provost in Chur in 1307. In 1310 he was appointed vicar general and deputy of the bishop of Chur. After the death of Chur's bishop Siegfried von Gelnhausen († 1321), Rudolf was appointed his successor and took office on 19 July 1322. However, Pope John XXII appointed him bishop of Konstanz shortly after, in October of the same year. He retained the position in Chur as administrator until he was replaced by the Konstanz Canon Johann Pfefferhard on 12 July 1325. Between 1330 and 1333 he was also administrator of the Abbey of Saint Gall, where some years prior, Rudolf's uncle Wilhelm von Montfort († 1301) had been presiding as prince-abbot between 1281 and 1301.

After the split election of 1318, the Konstanz episcopate had been vacant for four years. As a result, when Rudolf took office, the financial situation of the bishopric was already badly damaged. Rudolf began to focus on the financial betterment of the bishopric and the ecclesiastical life in his diocese.

In the struggle for the throne between Louis the Bavarian and the Habsburg Frederick the Fair, Rudolf and his brother Ulrich sided – against tradition of the counts of Montfort – with Habsburg. Regarding the dispute between King Louis and the pope, Rudolf and his cathedral chapter sided with the pope. Rudolf was caught in the crossfire when the imperial city of Konstanz sided with King Louis and the king made peace with the Habsburgs. He eventually yielded to the pressure in 1332 and agreed to receive the jura regalia. In 1333, the pope placed an anathema on him and lifted him from his administrative position in the abbey of Saint Gall. Since he had been excommunicated, after his death, Rudolf was buried in unhallowed ground in Arbon in 1334. Bishop Heinrich III of Brandis had his remains moved to the Konstanz Minster when he started his tenure in 1357.

== Reading list ==
- "Montfort, Rudolf von (Feldkirch)" in German, French and Italian in the online Historical Dictionary of Switzerland. in: Historisches Lexikon der Schweiz.
- Brigitte Degler-Spengler (2005). "Rudolf von Montfort". Neue Deutsche Biographie (in German). Vol. 22. Berlin: Duncker & Humblot. pp. 175–176. (full text online). (NDB) 22, Duncker & Humblot, Berlin 2005, ISBN 3-428-11203-2, pp. 175–176. (Digitalisat).
- Alexander Cartellieri (1907). "Rudolf, Graf von Montfort" . Allgemeine Deutsche Biographie (in German). Vol. 53. Leipzig: Duncker & Humblot. pp. 582–584. (ADB). Band 53, Duncker & Humblot, Leipzig 1907, S. 582–584.
- Bihrer, Andreas: Rudolf von Montfort. In: Biographisch-Bibliographisches Kirchenlexikon (BBKL) 23, Bautz, Nordhausen 2004, ISBN 3-88309-155-3, col. 1215–1221.
