= Wittichen Abbey =

Coordinates: 48.33481°N 8.34690°E

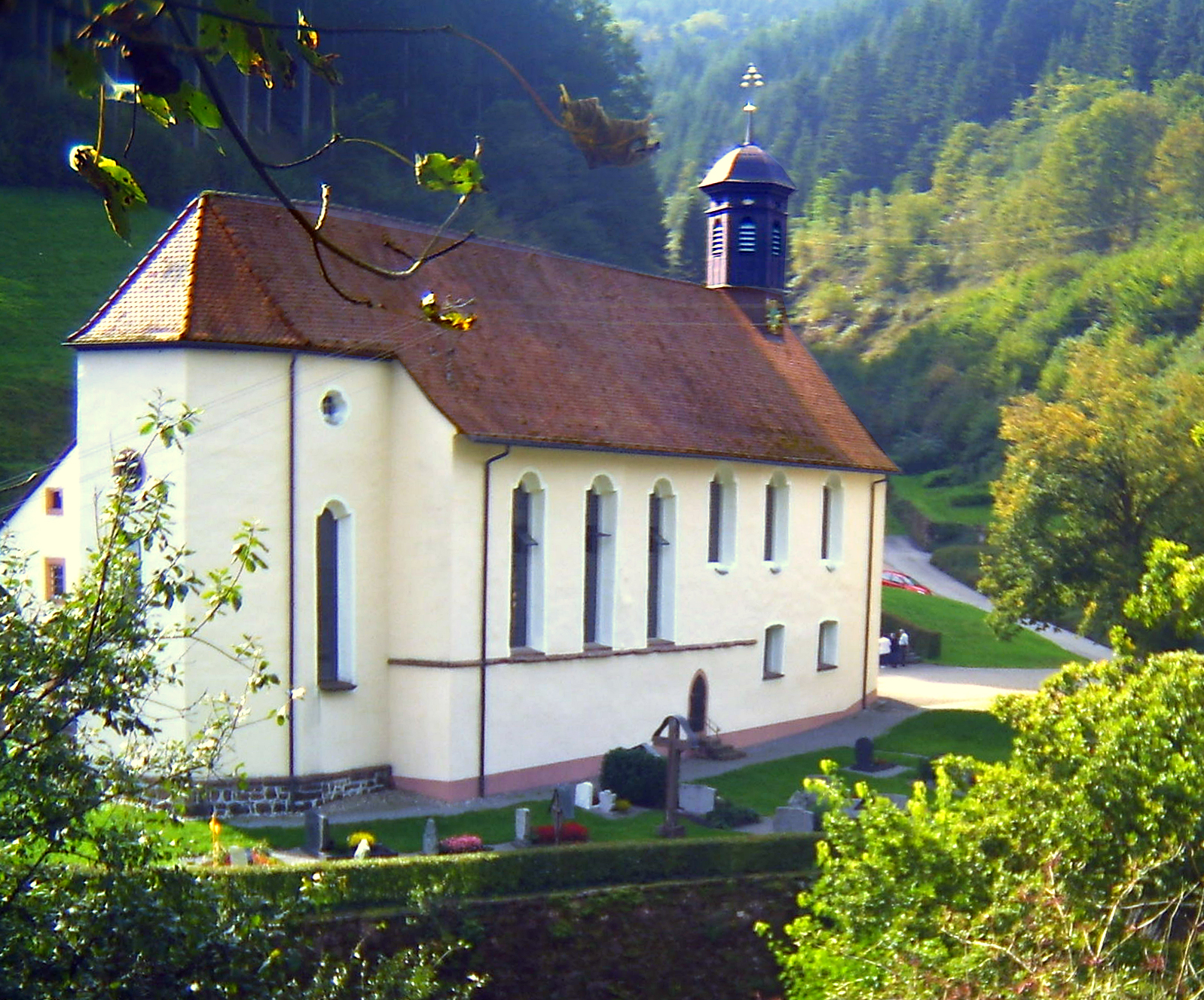
Abbey church and cemetery

Wittichen Abbey (German: Kloster Wittichen) is a former Poor Clares abbey in Wittichen in a narrow side valley of the Kleine Kinzig stream near Schenkenzell in the upper Kinzig valley in the Black Forest.

== History ==
The Lange Bau or Äbtissinnenbau (November 2026)

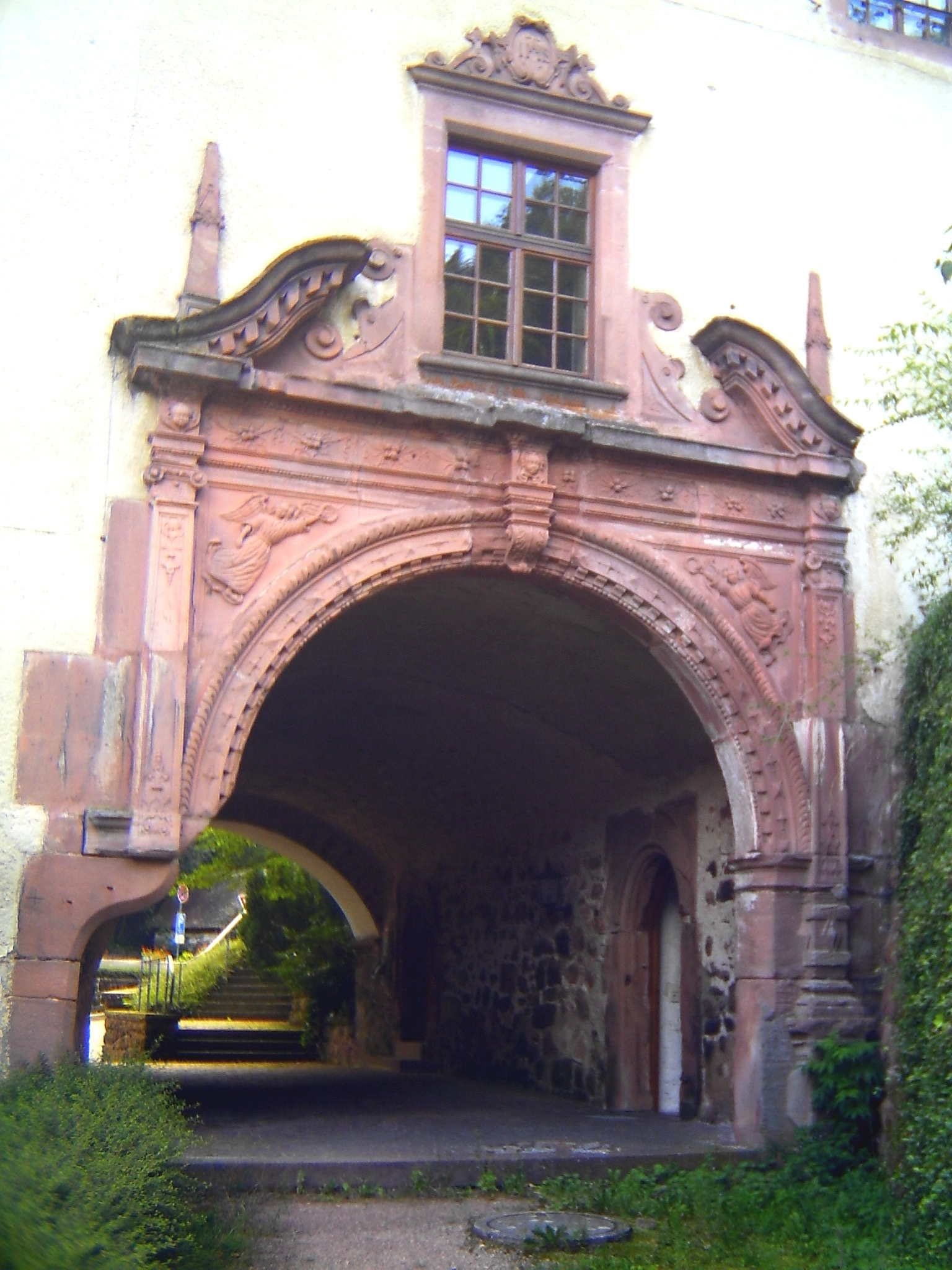
Abbey portal on the abbey building

Abbey museum in the old abbey stable building

The abbey was founded by Saint Luitgard of Wittichen in 1324. According to Luitgard, who came from the Schenkenzell village of Kaltbrunn-Vortal, God said to her on the site of the monastery: "Here you are to build me a house!" So she searched for other co-sisters and founded her abbey in the outback of Wittichen with 33 sisters.

The abbey found support from counts of Geroldseck as well as Queen Agnes of Hungary. Through her intervention the retreat was recognised as an abbey by John XXII.

== Present day ==
The monastery is near the entrance to the small village of Wittichen. The small monastery church has been preserved. It is in the baroque style, and houses Luitgard's grave. A number of the Counts of Urslingen are buried in the nearby cemetery. There are also circular hiking trails, some with information on mining in the Wittichen area.

== Sources ==
- Der Landkreis Rottweil, published by the Landesarchivdirektion Baden-Württemberg, Vo,.2, Ostfildern, 2003, pp. 156f
