= Luitgard Schwendenmann =

German-New Zealand ecosystem scientist

- Awards: Mercator Fellowship

Academic background
- Education: University of Göttingen, Karlsruhe Institute of Technology, University of Applied Sciences Bingen

Luitgard Schwendenmann is a German–New Zealand ecosystem scientist, and is a full professor at the University of Auckland, specialising in how nutrients, carbon and water cycle through the soil, plants and atmosphere.

== Academic career ==
Schwendenmann completed a Bachelor of Engineering at Bingen Technical University of Applied Sciences, followed by a Master of Science in Resource Engineering at Karlsruhe Institute of Technology and a PhD in landscape ecology at the Georg August University. Schwendenmann undertook postdoctoral research at the University of Wyoming, and then joined the faculty of the School of Environment at the University of Auckland in 2010, where she was promoted to full professor in 2024.

Schwendemann's research focuses on how nutrients, carbon and water cycle through the soil, plants and atmosphere. Schwendenmann learned about kauri dieback, a fungus-like disease of the native kauri tree, while working on urban ecosystems in Auckland, and became interested in the impact of pathogens on ecosystem functioning. She has also worked on myrtle rust, which affects plants in the Myrtaceae family, which in New Zealand includes pōhutukawa, northern rātā, and southern rātā.

In 2021, Schwendenmann received a Mercator Fellowship to spend three years studying the relationship between canopy structure and plant water uptake patterns, at the University of Jena in Germany.

Schwendenmann is co-lead with Simon Wegner and Nick Waipara of the Ngā Rākau Taketake – Risk Assessment and Ecological Impact theme of the Biological Heritage National Science Challenge.

== Selected works ==
- Nizzetto, Luca; MacLeod, Matthew; Borgå, Katrine; et al. (2010). "Past, present, and future controls on levels of persistent organic pollutants in the global environment". Environmental Science & Technology. 44 (17): 6526–6531. doi:10.1021/es100178f. PMID 20604560. Wikidata Q51812407.
- Schwendenmann, Luitgard; Edzo Veldkamp; Tania Brenes; Joseph J. O'Brien; Jens Mackensen (2003). "Spatial and temporal variation in soil CO2 efflux in an old-growth neotropical rain forest, La Selva, Costa Rica". Biogeochemistry. 64 (1): 111–128. doi:10.1023/a:1024941614919. Wikidata Q58290700.
- Schwendenmann, Luitgard; Elise Pendall; Rut Sanchez-Bragado; Kunert, Norbert; Dirk Hölscher (2014). "Tree water uptake in a tropical plantation varying in tree diversity: interspecific differences, seasonal shifts and complementarity". Ecohydrology. 8 (1): 1–12. doi:10.1002/eco.1479. Wikidata Q57065985.
- Schwendenmann, Luitgard; EDZO VELDKAMP; Moser, Gerald; et al. (2010). "Effects of an experimental drought on the functioning of a cacao agroforestry system, Sulawesi, Indonesia". Global Change Biology. 16 (5): 1515–1530. doi:10.1111/j.1365-2486.2009.02034.x. Wikidata Q57114473.
- Edzo Veldkamp; Anja Becker; Schwendenmann, Luitgard; Deborah A. Clark; Hubert Schulte-Bisping (2003). "Substantial labile carbon stocks and microbial activity in deeply weathered soils below a tropical wet forest". Global Change Biology. 9 (8): 1171–1184. doi:10.1046/j.1365-2486.2003.00656.x. Wikidata Q58290706.
- Markus Kleber; Schwendenmann, Luitgard; Edzo Veldkamp; Jenny Rößner; Reinhold Jahn (2007). "Halloysite versus gibbsite: Silicon cycling as a pedogenetic process in two lowland neotropical rain forest soils of La Selva, Costa Rica". Geoderma. 138 (1–2): 1–11. Bibcode:2007Geode.138....1K. doi:10.1016/j.geoderma.2006.10.004. Wikidata Q58290672.
