= Johann Baptist Weiß (priest) =

Johann Baptist Weiß (1753-1800) was a German Benedictine monk, teacher and playwright.

== Life ==
Johann Baptist Weiß was born on 4 January 1753 in Wittichen, took his monastic vows on 6 June 1773 at St. Blaise Abbey in the Black Forest and was ordained as a priest in 1776. He became a teacher of theology at the abbey. Later, he took over the parish of Schluchsee. On 21 June 1793 he gave the eulogy at the graveside of the abbot, Martin Gerbert. In 1794, after the schools in Konstanz were taken over by the Benedictines of the anterior Austrian bishoprics, Pastor Weiß was entrusted with the post of apostolic prefect (Präfektstelle) at the grammar school there. He died in 1800 in Konstanz.

== Works ==
- Festrede, gehalten am 8. Tage der Feierlichkeiten bei Einweihung der neuen Kirche zu St. Blasien. St. Gallen, 1784 (Official speech given on the 8th day of the celebrations for the consecration of the new church at St. Blasien)
- Trauer- und Lobrede auf Martin Gerbert, weiland Fürstabten zu S. Blasien, gehalten von J. B. Weiß, Capitular dasselbst, an seine Mitbrüder, bei dem feierlichen Leichenbegängnisse am 21. Brachmonat 1793. S. Blasien (Eulogy for Martin Gerbert, late prince abbot of the cathedral of St. Blasien)
- Über die Verbindung guter Sitten mit den Wissenschaften. Eine Ermahnungsrede an die Zöglinge des Gymnasiums zu Constanz, gehalten am 8. Christmonat 1794. Constanz 1795

== Literature ==
- Joseph Bader: Das ehemalige Kloster St. Blasien auf dem Schwarzwalde und seine Gelehrten-Academie (= Freiburger Diöcesan Archiv, VIII vol.). Herder, Freiburg, 1874, p. 122 (, p. 122, at Google Books).
