= Anselm the Younger, Count of Nagold =

11th-century count of Nagold

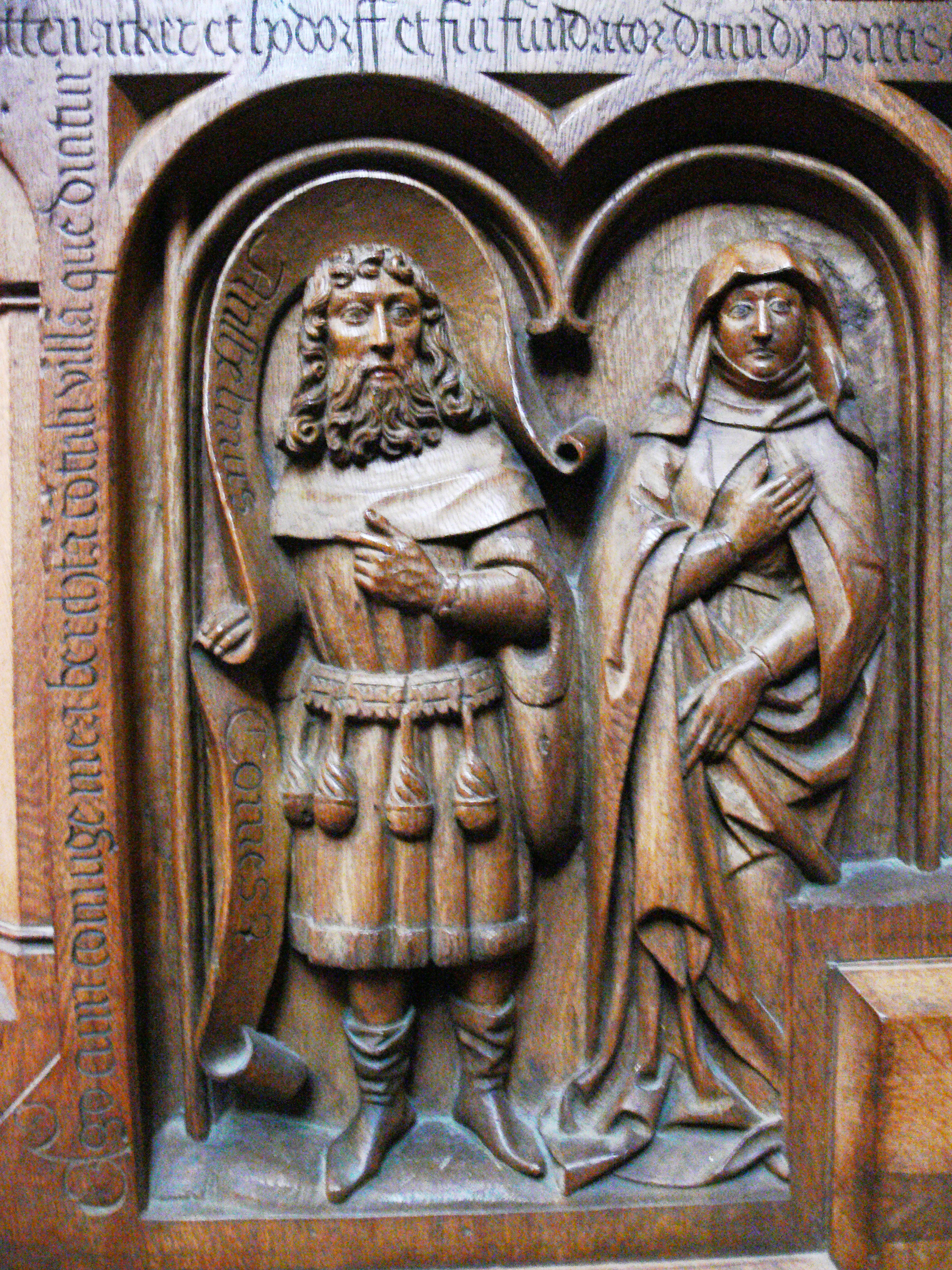
- Relief of Anselm and his wife Bertha in the monastery of Blaubeuren
- Successor: Henry, count of Nagold
- Died: 25 December 1087
- Spouse: Bertha
- Issue: Henry

Anselm of Nagoldgau, called "the Younger", (died 25 December 1087) was a count of Nagold.

== Biography ==
Anselm is mainly known as one of the founders of the monastery of Blaubeuren, together with his brothers Hugo I, count of Tübingen and Sigibot, count of Tübingen. L. Schmid speculates that the county, at that time, might be divided between the three brothers.

His wife was called Bertha, his son was Henry, count of Nagold.

According to a necorologius found in Blaubeuren, he died on the 25th of December 1087, with his wife dying the following day.
