= Elise Pendall =

American soil and ecosystem ecologist

Elise Gislaine Pendall
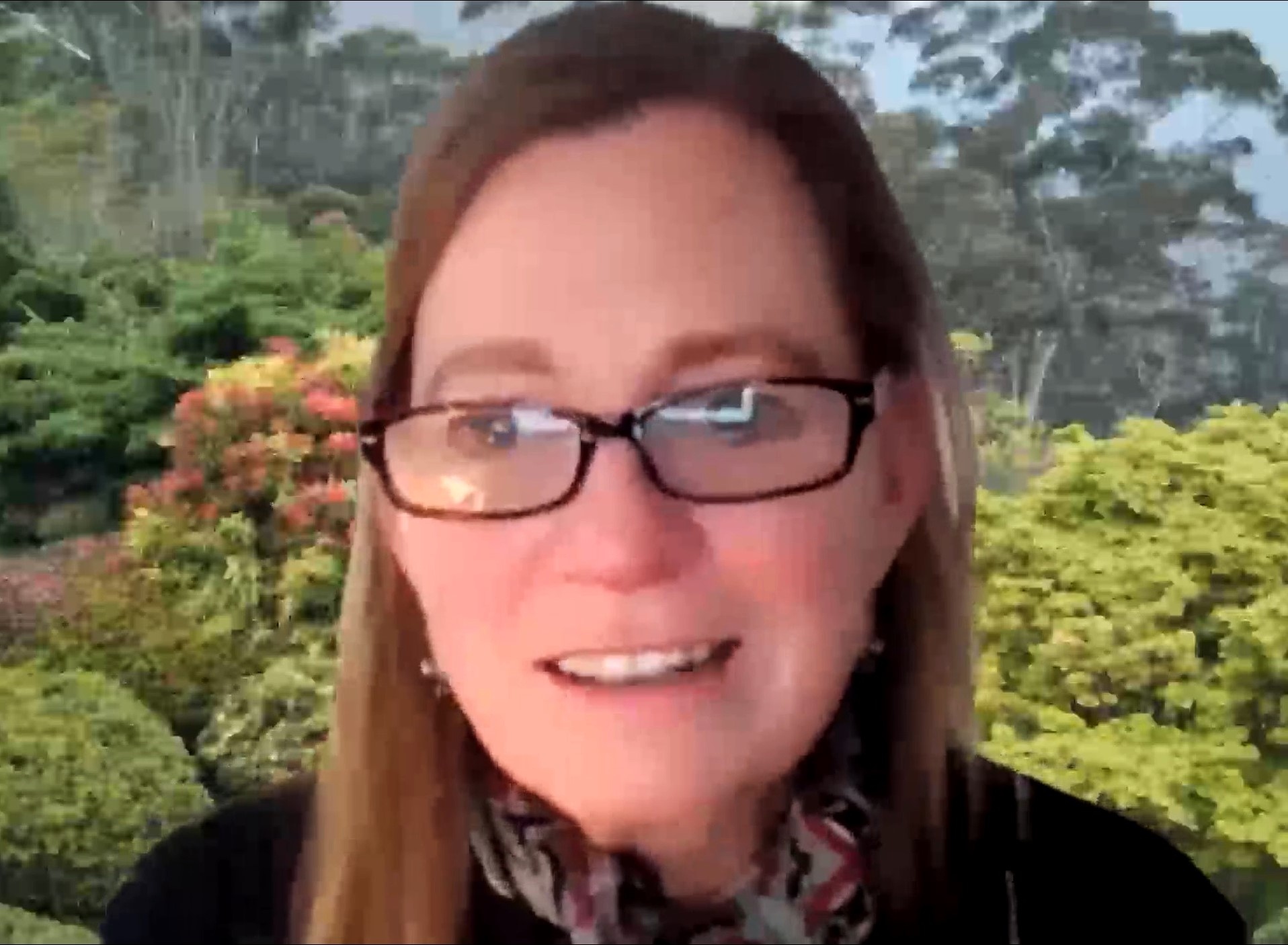
- Pendall at a 2021 webinar
- Education: University of Arizona
- Scientific career
- Workplaces: Hawkesbury Institute for the Environment; Western Sydney University
- Thesis: Precipitation seasonality recorded in D/H rations of pinyon pine cellulose in the southwestern United States (1997)
- Website: Pendall Lab

Elise Gislaine Pendall is an American soil and ecosystem ecologist who is a professor at Western Sydney University. She studies how biogeochemical cycling responds to climate change and disturbances to the ecosystem.

== Early life and education ==
Pendall was an undergraduate student at Cornell University and a master's student at the University of California, Berkeley. She completed her doctoral research at the University of Arizona. Her research considered pinyon pine cellulose in the United States. After graduating, she moved to the University of Colorado Boulder as a research assistant.

== Research and career ==
At the University of Wyoming, Pendall studied carbon and water fluxes between ecosystems and the atmosphere. She looked at how elevated levels of carbon dioxide impacted these water fluxes.

In 2014 Pendall moved to Western Sydney University, where she joined the Hawkesbury Institute for the Environment and established a master's program on Ecosystems in the Changing World. She investigates Eddy covariance, a technique that allows measurement of turbulent fluxes that occur within atmospheric boundary layers, and stable isotope analysis. As she is located in Sydney, Pendall has investigated local flora, including the native eucalyptus. Her research considers carbon regulation above and below ground, and how carbon is stored in soil.

== Selected publications ==
- T W Crowther; K E O Todd-Brown; C W Rowe; et al. (1 November 2016). "Quantifying global soil carbon losses in response to warming". Nature. 540 (7631): 104–108. doi:10.1038/nature20150. ISSN 1476-4687. PMID 27905442. Wikidata Q31146293.
- ALAN K. KNAPP; JOHN M. BRIGGS; SCOTT L. COLLINS; et al. (March 2008). "Shrub encroachment in North American grasslands: shifts in growth form dominance rapidly alters control of ecosystem carbon inputs". Global Change Biology. 14 (3): 615–623. doi:10.1111/j.1365-2486.2007.01512.x. ISSN 1354-1013. Wikidata Q57066075.
- C. Terrer; R. P. Phillips; B. A. Hungate; et al. (24 March 2021). "A trade-off between plant and soil carbon storage under elevated CO2". Nature. 591 (7851): 599–603. Bibcode:2021Natur.591..599T. doi:10.1038/s41586-021-03306-8. ISSN 1476-4687. PMID 33762765. Wikidata Q110944647.
