= Anselm of Nagoldgau the Elder =

10th-century count of Nagold

Anselm of Nagoldgau, called "the Elder" (fl. 966), is the oldest known count of Nagold.

== Biography ==
He is cited in 966, when Emperor Otto I confirmed a donation of propriety in the county of a certain Anselm, near the village of Kuppingen. L. Schmid interpreted this county as being Nagold.
