= Conrad I of Württemberg =

Founder of the Württemberg dynasty, r. 1083–1110

Conrad I of Württemberg ("Konrad von Wirtinisberc, C(u) onradus de Wirdeberch") was the first ruler of the castle of Wirtemberg from 1083 to 1110, and is first mentioned in 1081. He is considered to be the founder of the Württemberg dynasty.

Conrad was the son of a nobleman, von Beutelsbach, and possibly a descendant of the Salic duke Conrad of Carinthia. His brother was Bruno von Beutelsbach (1105–1120), prior of the Abbey of Hirsau. His wife's name was Werntrud.

About 1083 Conrad built a castle on the Wirtemberg close to today's Stuttgart. He made this place his domicile and named himself after it. Under his new name Conrad was a witness some time between 1089 and 1092 to the so-called Bempflinger Vertrag (treaty) of the counts Kuno and Liutold von Achalm with their nephew, count Wernher von Grüningen. On May 5, 1092 in Ulm he witnessed the transfer of property to the Abbey of Allerheiligen near Schaffhausen. This is the first time that his name is mentioned in a complete document, however this document is not an original. In both situations Conrad I appears closely connected to people who are opponents to Henry IV, Holy Roman Emperor. This political stance is in agreement with the fact that he asked the Bishop of Worms, an opponent of the Emperor, to consecrate his chapel of the castle, in preference to the Bishop of Constance in whose territory the castle actually was situated.

Already earlier, perhaps between 1080 and 1087, Conrad had helped the Abbey of Hirsau with donations as documented in the Hirsauer Schenkungsbuch ("Hirsau Abbey Gift Register"). In this document he is characterized as a "mighty man among the Swabians".

Preceded by none	Count of Württemberg before 1081–1110	Succeeded by Konrad II
