= Elisabeth of Württemberg (1412–1476) =

German Noblewoman

Elisabeth of Württemberg (after 1412 - after 29 April 1476) was a German noblewoman.

== Life ==
The daughter of Eberhard III, Count of Württemberg and Elisabeth of Nuremberg, she was engaged to Albert III, Duke of Bavaria on 15 January 1528. However, after his secret marriage to the maid Agnes Bernauer, she later married Count John IV of Werdenberg at the court of Ludwig I, Count of Württemberg-Urach - their children included John II of Werdenberg.

== Sources ==
- Dr. Thomas Fricke. "Landesarchiv Baden-Württemberg, Abt. Hauptstaatsarchiv Stuttgart - Findbuch A 602: Württembergische Regesten - Strukturansicht". Archived from the original on 2016-01-17.
