= Luitgard of Wittichen =

German nun (1291–1348)

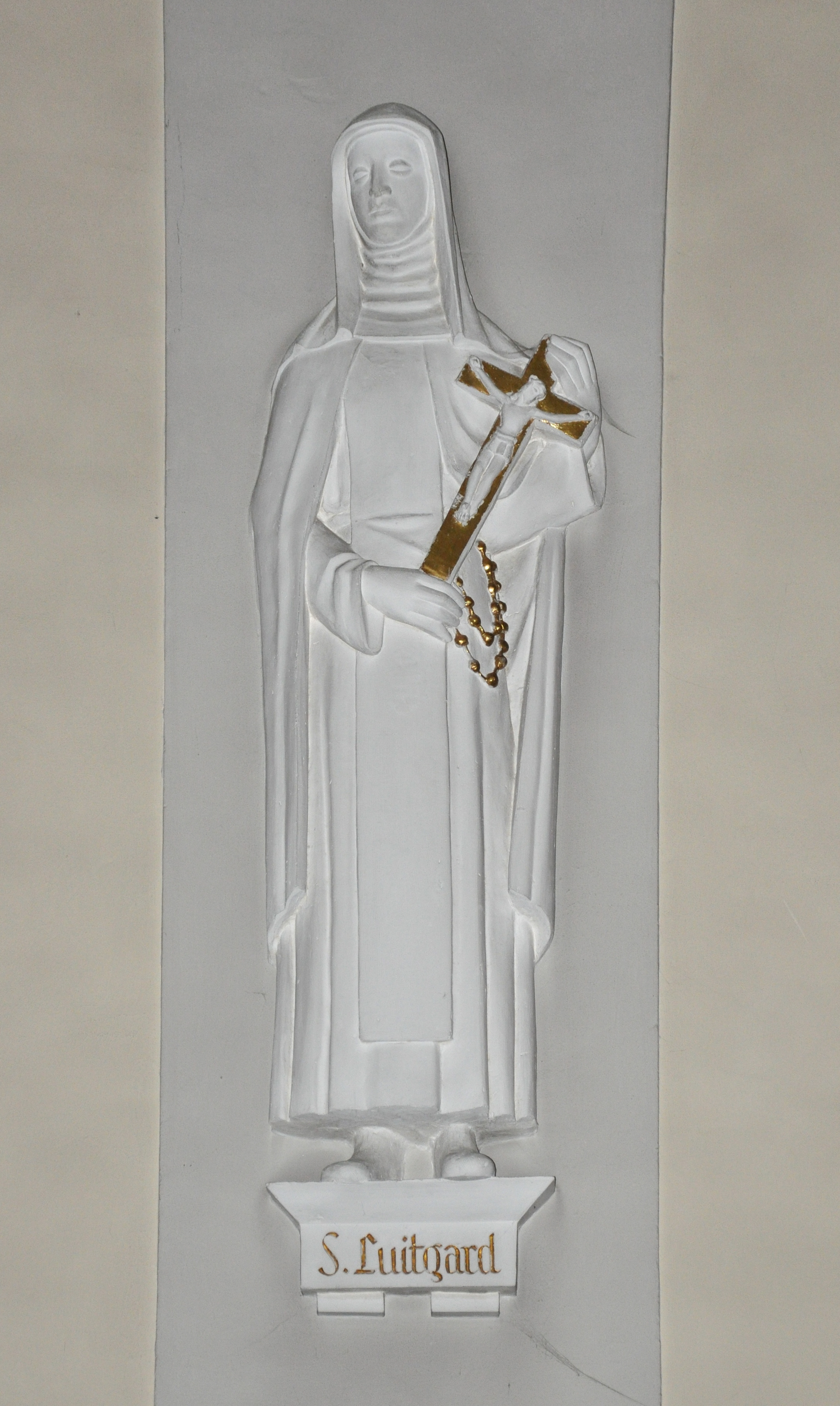
High relief figure (20th century) in the parish church of St. Arbogast in Haslach im Kinzigtal

Luitgard of Wittichen (German: Luitgard von Wittichen, 1291–1348) was a German nun, mystic and founder of a convent.

== Life and works ==
Luitgard (also Lutgard) of Wittichen was born in 1291 in Schenkenzell in the Black Forest and came from a simple, peasant background. At the age of twelve she was admitted to a beguine house in Oberwolfach in the valley of the river Wolf, where she lived for 20 years in voluntary poverty. As the result of a vision of Christ she was called to found a convent. She went on trips to the Tyrol and Switzerland to raise funds for the founding of the convent. She was treated unjustly by the dukes of Teck at the nearby castle of Schiltach, while the lords of Geroldseck at the Schenkenburg were devoted to her.

In 1324 Luitgard moved to the Wittichen valley and founded a hermitage (Klause) for herself and 33 other women, which later became the Franciscan tertiary convent of Wittichen. The number of women was based on the 33-line Canticle of the Sun, a canticle by Saint Francis of Assisi, although the number of women doubled even in Luitgard's lifetime. She was the abbess of the convent until her death.

Luitgard contemplated the life and Passion of Christ in a rosary-like manner. Luitgard cared for victims of the plague, before she herself succumbed to the epidemic. She died on 16 October 1348 at Wittichen Abbey near Schenkenzell.

== Veneration ==
She is honored in central Baden, even though she was never canonized. Luitgard is believed to have been familiar with the writings of Meister Eckhart and Heinrich Seuse and is regarded as a mystic in her own right. Her spiritual father, the priest, Berchtold of Bombach, published a biography of Luitgard in around 1350. In 1629, according to tradition, when her coffin was opened, her brain was found to be incorrupt. Being considered a miracle, veneration and pilgrimages increased.

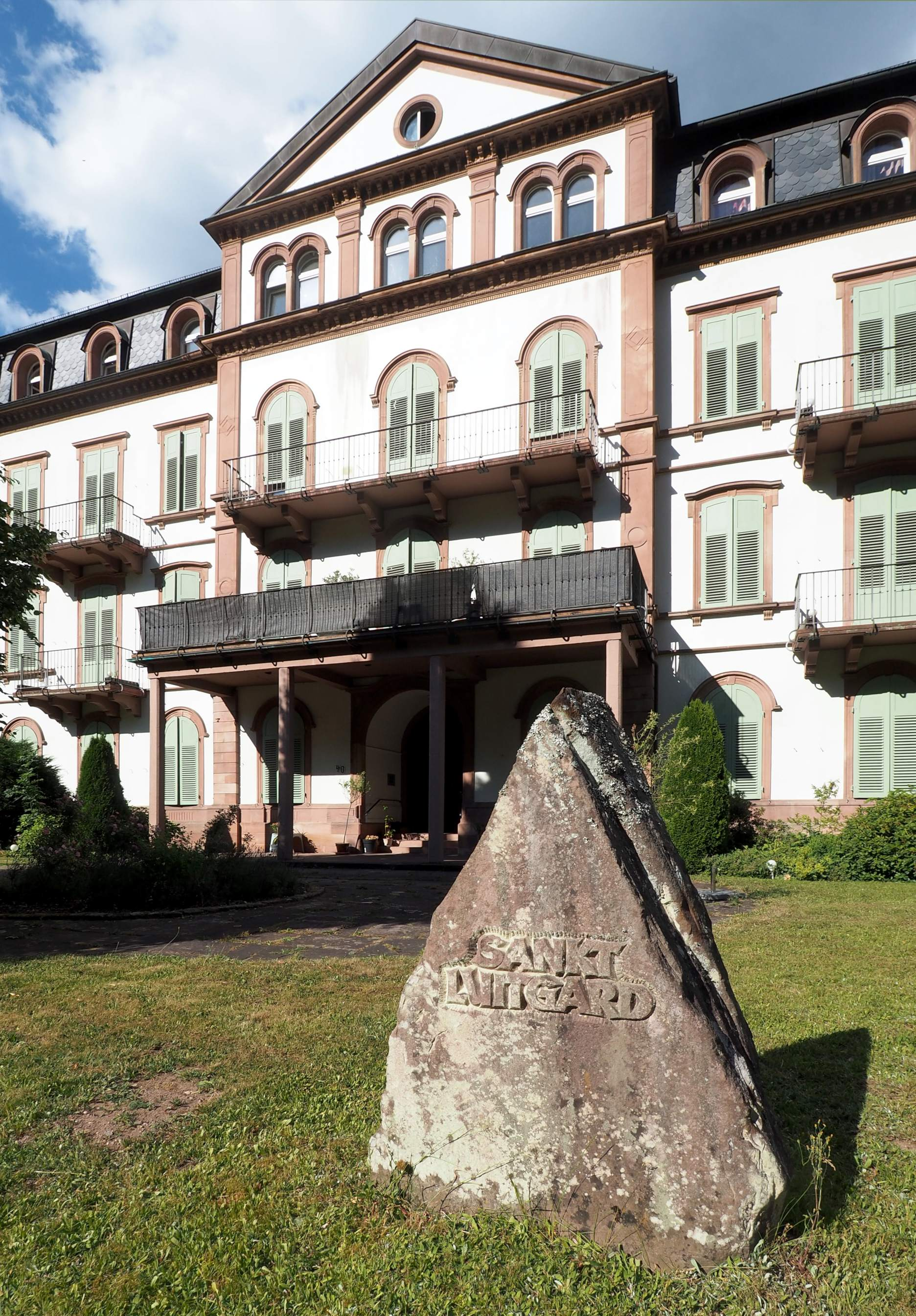
Inscription Sankt Luitgard at the former nunnery in Bad Rippoldsau

She is remembered on 16 October, the date she died. On the second Sunday in October, the Luitgard Festival takes place in Wittichen. The St. Luitgard Care Home in Oberwolfach is named after her.

== See also ==
- Lutgardis

== Literature ==
- Berthold von Bombach, Arnold Guillet: Das Leben der heiligen Luitgard von Wittichen (1291-1348), die Heilige des Mutterschosses. Reprint: Christiana, 1976, ISBN 978-3-7171-0651-7.
- Gertrud Jaron Lewis, Frank Willaert, Marie-José Govers: Bibliographie zur deutschen Frauenmystik des Mittelalters. Verlag Schmidt, 1989, p. 248, ISBN 978-3-503-02276-2.
- Irmtraud Just: Die Vita Luitgarts von Wittichen: Text des Donaueschinger Codex 118. Peter Lang, 2000, ISBN 978-3-906765-34-1.
- Peter Dinzelbacher, Deutsche und niederländische Mystik des Mittelalters, Berlin, 2010.
