= Rudolf I, Count Palatine of Tübingen =

Rudolph I, Count Palatine of Tübingen
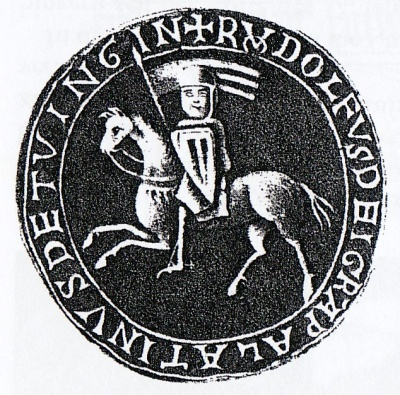
- Seal of Rudolph I
- Born: 1160
- Died: 17 March 1219
- Noble family: House of Nagold
- Spouse: Matilda of Gleiberg
- Father: Hugo II, Count Palatine of Tübingen
- Mother: Elisabeth of Bregenz

Rudolph I, Count Palatine of Tübingen (1160 – 17 March 1219) was the eldest son of Count Palatine Hugo II, Count Palatine of Tübingen. Around 1183, he founded the Premonstratensian Bebenhausen Abbey as a burial place for his family.

He married Matilda, Countess of Gleiberg and heir of Giessen (d. 1206). They had three sons.

- Rudolph II (c. 1185 – 1 November 1247), inherited Horb, Herrenberg and Tübingen.
- Hugo V (c. 1185 – 26 July 1216)
- William, Count of Asperg-Giessen (c. 1190 – c. 1252/1256)
