= Rench Valley Trail =

Hiking trail in Germany

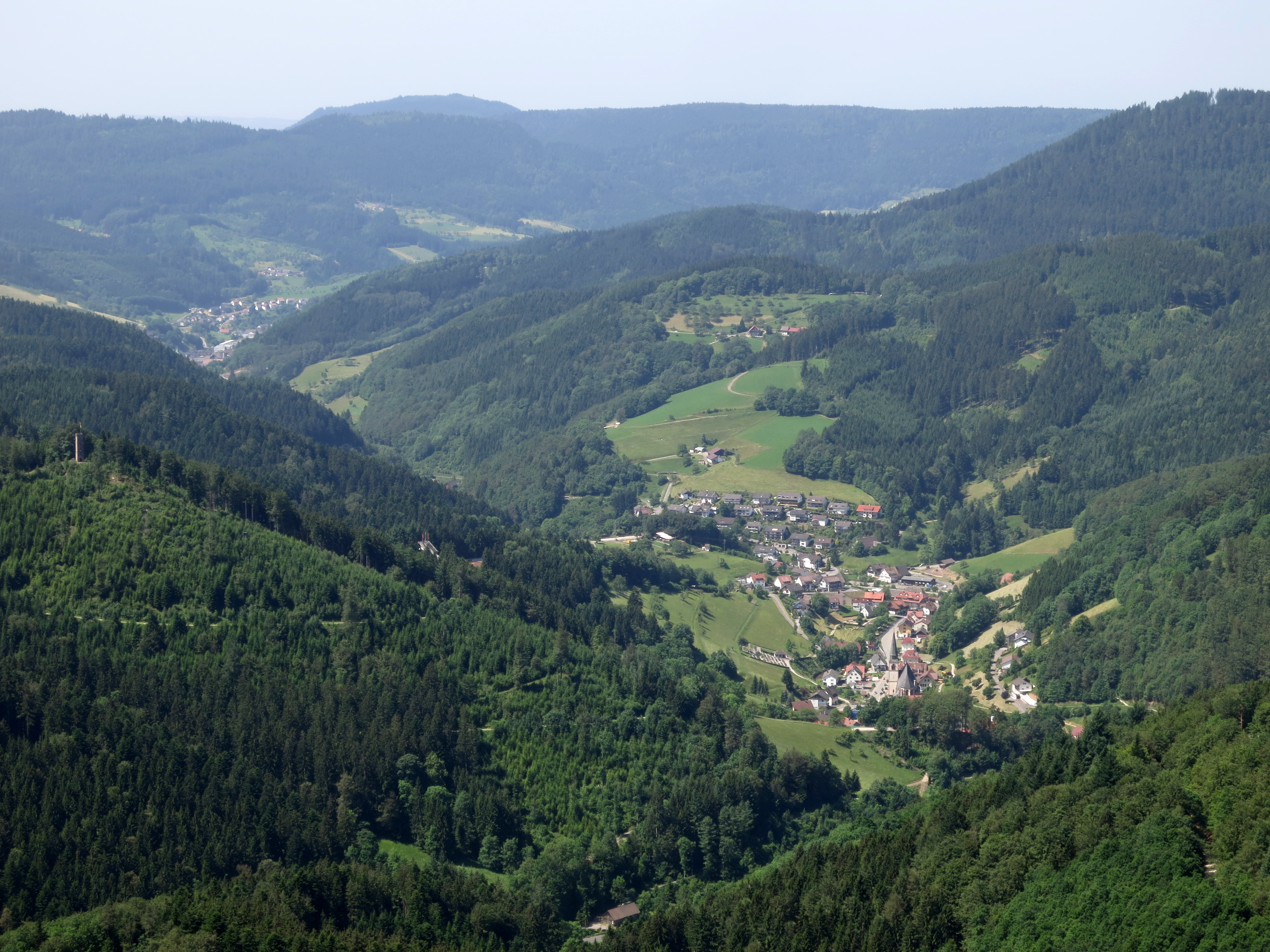
- View of the Rench valley from the Bauernkopf
- Length: 98 km
- Location: Germany, Baden-Württemberg, Black Forest
- Trailheads: Bottenau; Ruins of Schauenburg
- Use: hiking trail
- Elevation change: 863 m
- Highest point: Schliffkopf (1,055 m)
- Lowest point: Bottenau (192 m)
- Difficulty: medium
- Season: spring to autumn
- Waymark: blue and green diamond with a stylised "rs" on a white background
- Maintainer: Black Forest Club

The Rench Valley Trail (German: Renchtalsteig) is a 98-kilometre-long 'prestige hiking trail (Prädikatswanderweg) in the Central/North Black Forest Nature Park in Germany. It runs in five stages around the Rench valley with its start and finish near Oberkirch.

== History ==
The Rench Valley Trail was first certified on 15 January 2011 by the German Rambling Association as a high quality German trail (Qualitätsweg Wanderbares Deutschland) and opened on 22 May 2011.

== Short description ==
From its starting point in Bottenau the Rench Valley Trail runs through vineyards to Schloss Staufenberg and continues to the Mooskopf with its Moos Tower. With steep ascents and descents in places, the route runs along the southern side of the Rench valley past Oppenau and Bad Peterstal to the Alexanderschanze. After passing the source of the Rench, the highest point on the route is reached: the Schliffkopf. The path now runs downhill to the ruins of All Saints' Abbey and the All Saints Waterfalls. Returning to the Rench valley, the route reaches its finishing point at the ruins of the Schauenburg.

== Literature ==
- Naturpark Schwarzwald Mitte/Nord (publ.): Wandern auf dem Renchtalsteig.
- Martin Kuhnle: Schwarzwald Mitte/Nord. Bergverlag Rother, Munich, 2013, ISBN 978-3-7633-4420-8, pp. 122–139.
