= Uta =

Uta or UTA may refer to:

== Universities ==
- University of Texas at Arlington, in the United States
- University of Texas at Austin, in the United States
- University of Tarapacá, in Chile
- University of Tampere, in Finland

== Sports ==
- FC UTA Arad, a Romanian football club based in the town of Arad
- A common abbreviation in box scores and television on-screen graphics for the American basketball team Utah Jazz

== Organizations ==
- Ulster Transport Authority
- Union de Transports Aériens, a defunct French airline
- Union des Transports Africains de Guinée, a defunct west African airline
- United Talent Agency, a Hollywood talent agency
- Central UTA of Monsey, a Hasidic school in Airmont, New York
- United Telekom Austria
- Urban Transit Authority
- Utah Transit Authority, a public transportation agency in Utah, United States
- The United Companies of the Train of Artillery of the Town of Providence

== Places ==
- Uta, Sardinia, a comune in the Province of Cagliari, Italy
- Uta, Indonesia, a coastal village in Papua
- Ūta, a village in Lithuania

== People ==
- Uta (given name)
- Uta (surname)

== Other uses ==
- Urological (or Urogenital) teaching associate, in medical education
- Uta, another name for the skin condition cutaneous leishmaniasis
- Uta, genus of New World lizards known as side-blotched lizards
- A form of Japanese poetry, usually called waka
- Upper tangent arc, an atmospheric optical phenomenon
- Unitate teritorială autonomă, Romanian for "autonomous territorial unit", an autonomous type of administrative division in Moldova
