= Moos (mountain) =

Mountain in Germany

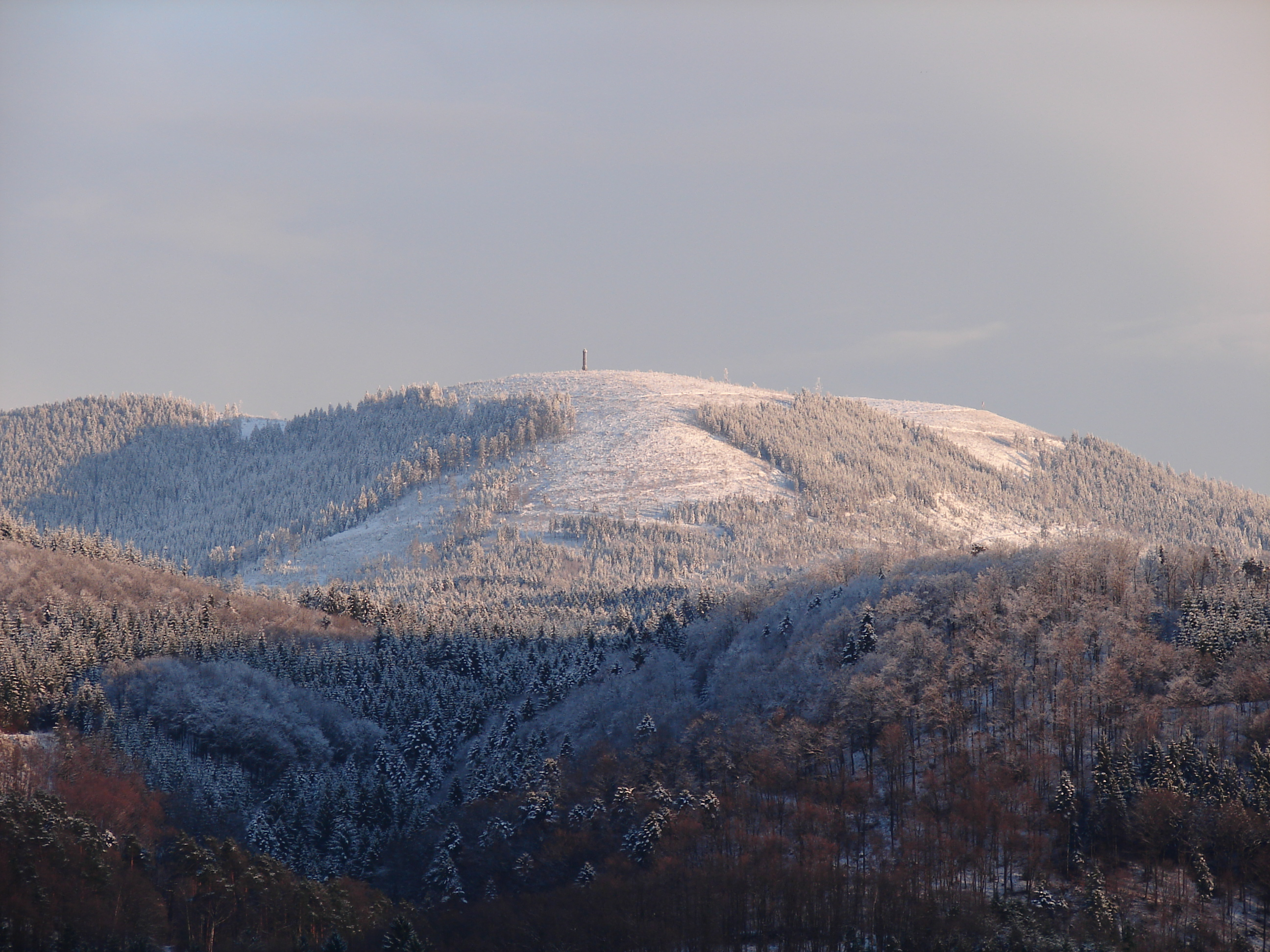

Highest point
- Elevation: 877.5 m (2,879 ft)
- Coordinates: 48°26′53″N 8°05′41″E

Geography
- Location within Baden-Württemberg
- Location: Baden-Württemberg, Germany
- Parent range: Black Forest

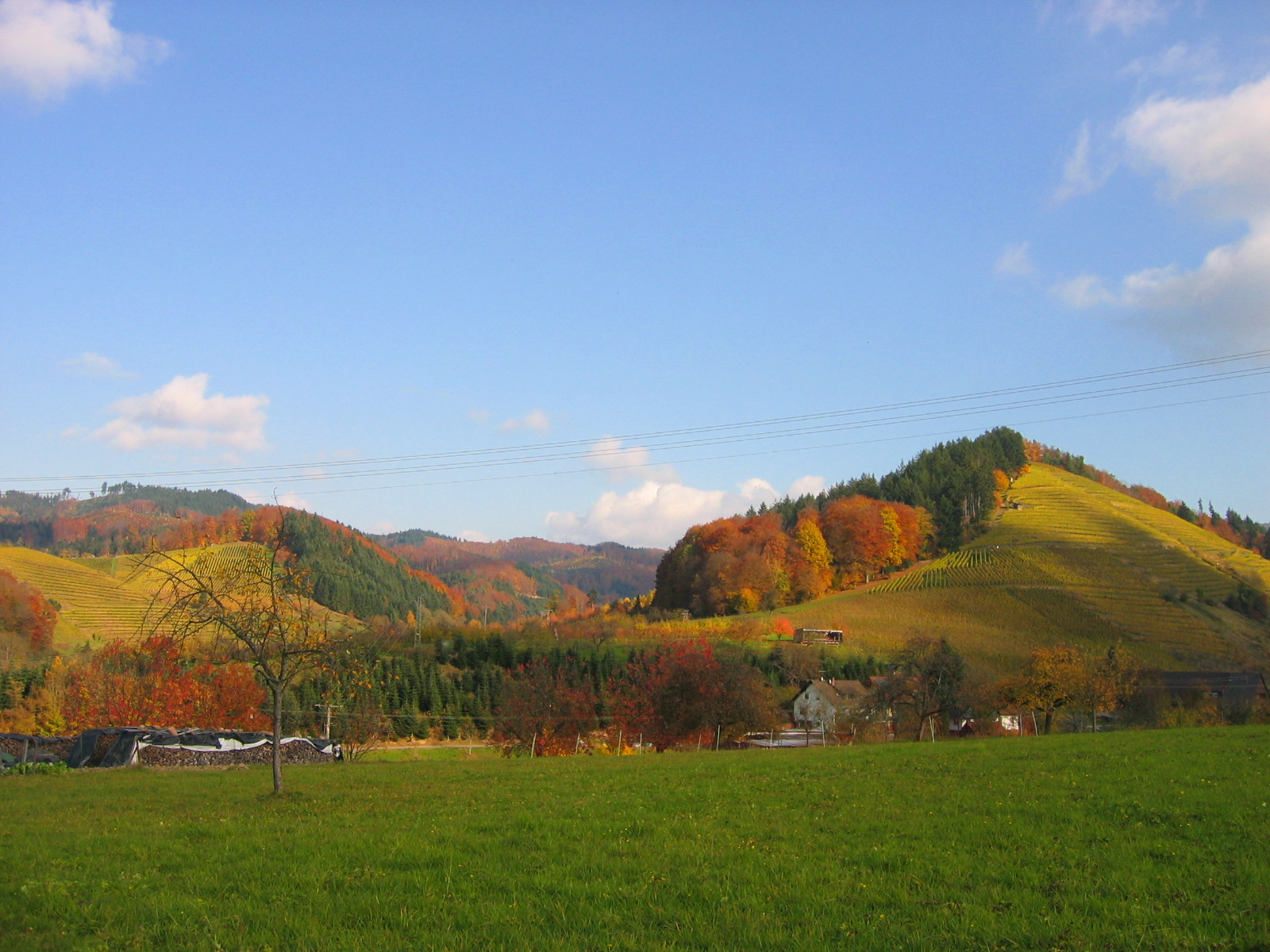
nearby from Mooskopf

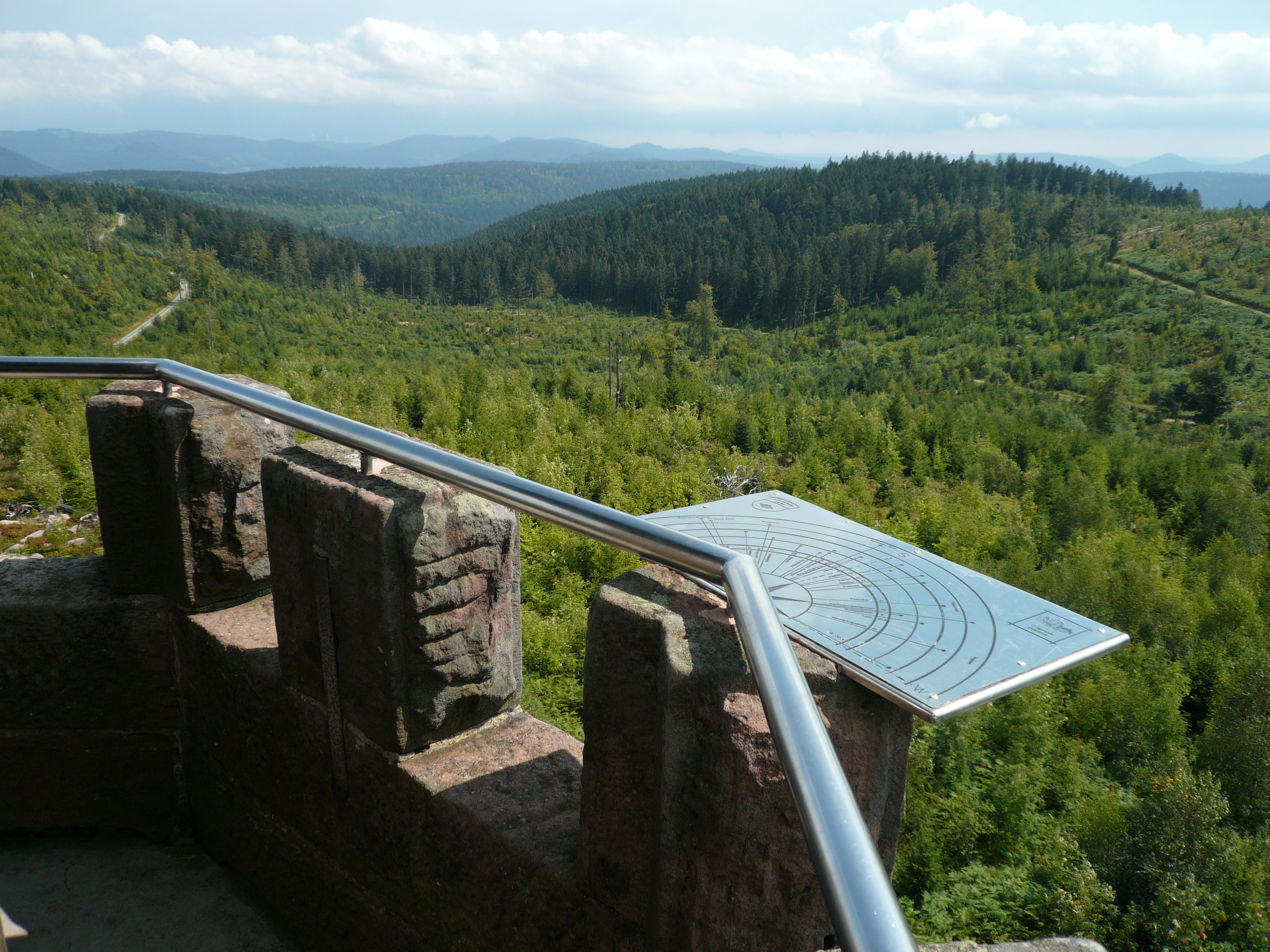
The Moos Tower

The Moos (German pronunciation: [moːs]) is a mountain range in the Central Black Forest in southern Germany. Its highest points are the Siedigkopf (877.5 m above sea level (NHN)) and the Mooskopf (871.2 m above NHN), actually the Geisschleifkopf. The Moos is the local mountain or Hausberg of Gengenbach and Oppenau.

The Moos separates the valleys of the Rench and the Kinzig in an east-west direction. At the same time the Nordrach valley and theformerly free imperial valley of the Harmersbach rise on it and flow in a north-south direction.

Due to its formerly dense and dark afforestation, the Moos is the scene of numerous legends and legendary figures. A leading character that appears time and again is the Moospfaff, an old monk from All Saints' Abbey, who on his way to an extreme unction lost the host and now searches around leads people astray whilst he tries to find the host.

The fictional character Simplicius Simplicissimus, who is commemorated on a monument, from the novel Der abenteuerliche Simplicissimus by Hans Jakob Christoffel von Grimmelshausen, lived for several years on the Moos during the Thirty Years' War.

There is an observation tower, the Moos Tower (Moosturm), on the Mooskopf which was erected in 1890 and is maintained by the Black Forest Club.

On the Geißschleif Saddle between the Mooskopf and the Siedigkopf is the junction of three trails: the Kandelhöhen Way, Gengenbach–Alpirsbach Black Forest Trail and the Rench Valley Trail. On the Kornebene (640 m above NN) the Friends of Nature's Gengenbach branch run a managed hut (Kornebene Friends of Nature House) with overnight accommodation. In the municipal territory of Nordrach at a height of 589 m is Gasthaus Moosbach, the highest inn in the county of Ortenau and the whole of the Moos hills.

On 26 Dec 1999, Hurricane Lothar caused serious damage on the Mooskopf and Siedigkopf. Hitherto the summits were densely covered with high spruce and fir trees which largely blocked the view from the observation tower. After the storm had destroyed the trees, instead of the old monoculture, a considerably more varied mixed forest emerged. On the Siedigkopf is a monument that commemorates the hurricane.

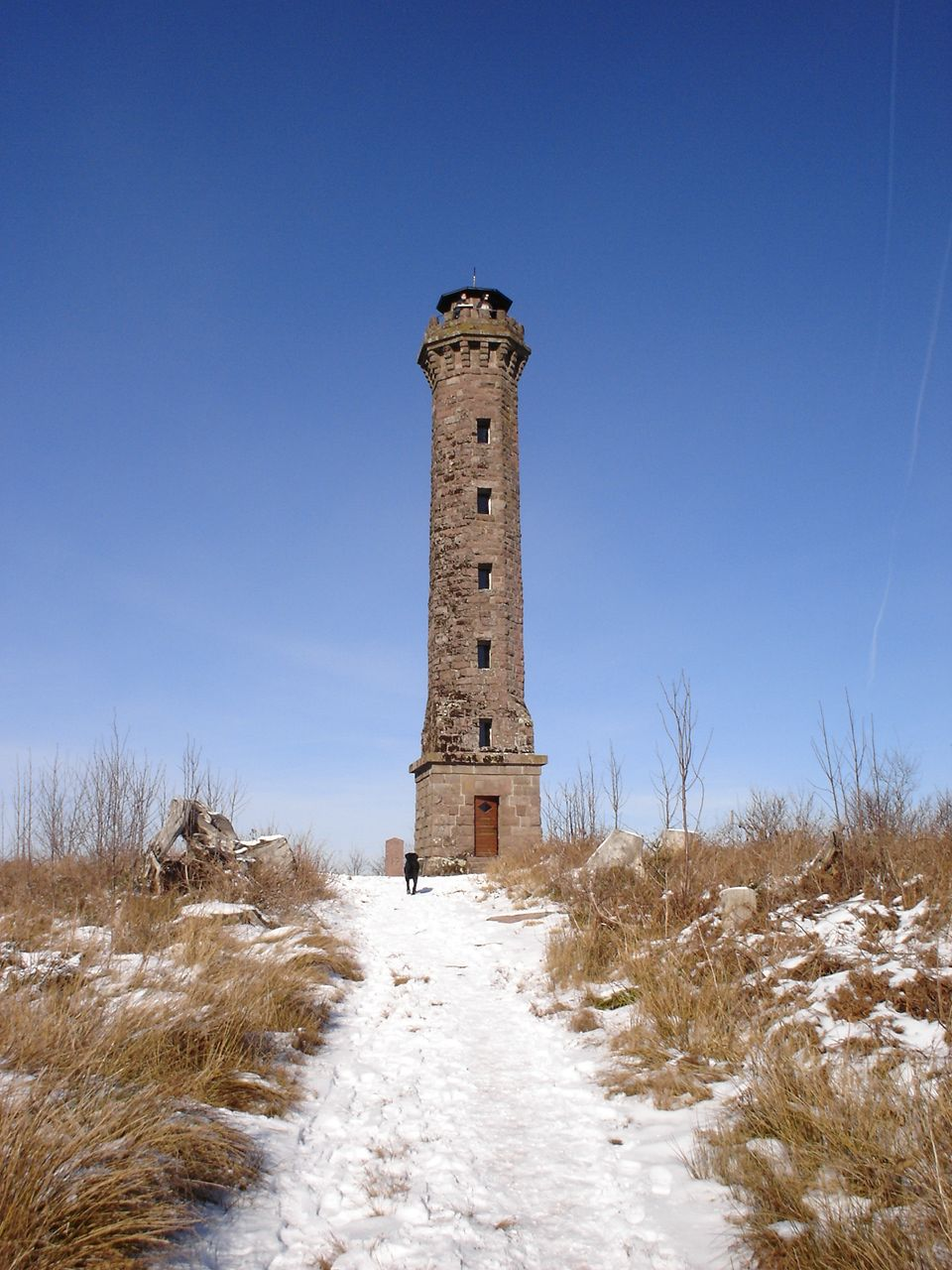
The Moos Tower (Moosturm), Oct 2007

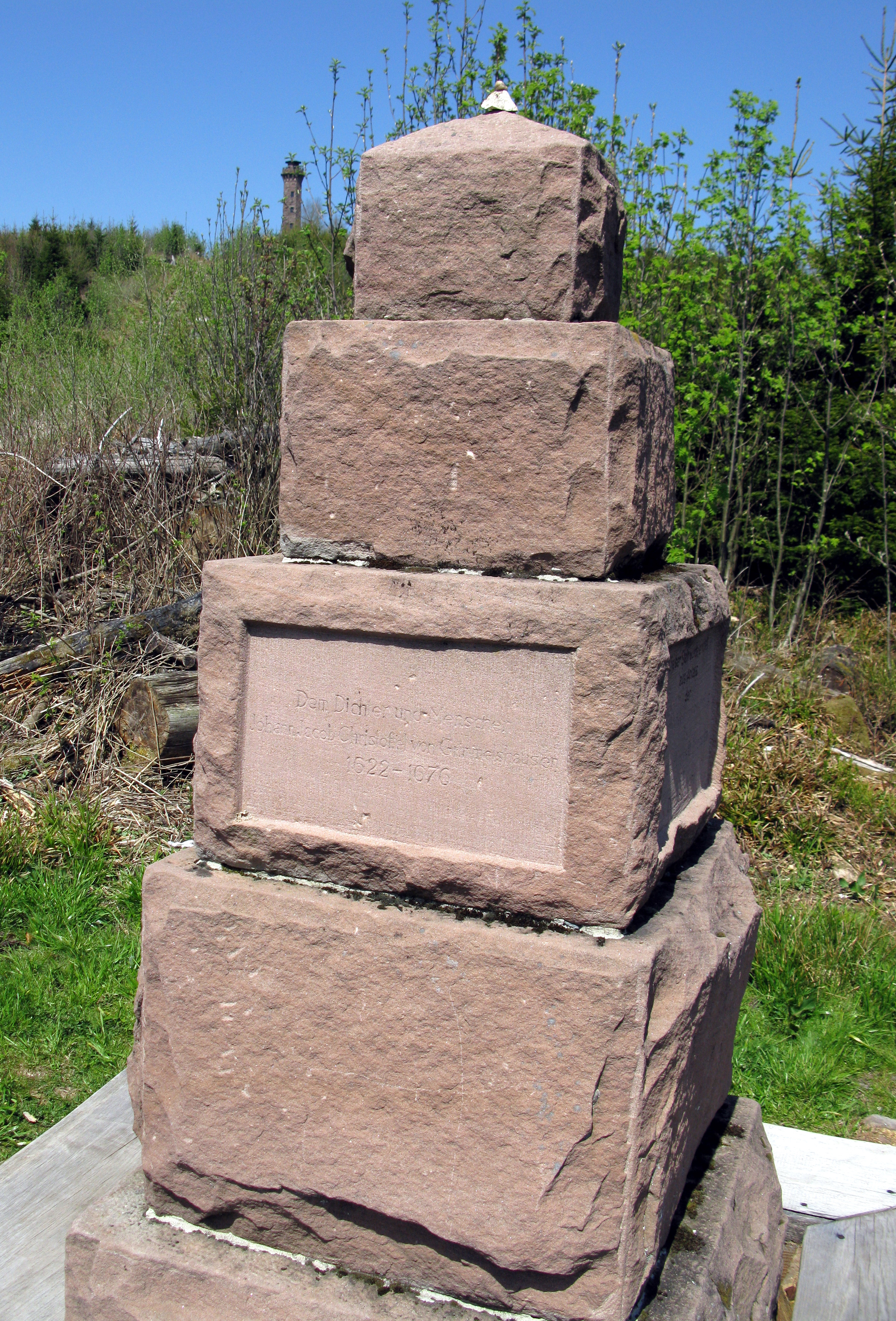
Grimmelshausen monument

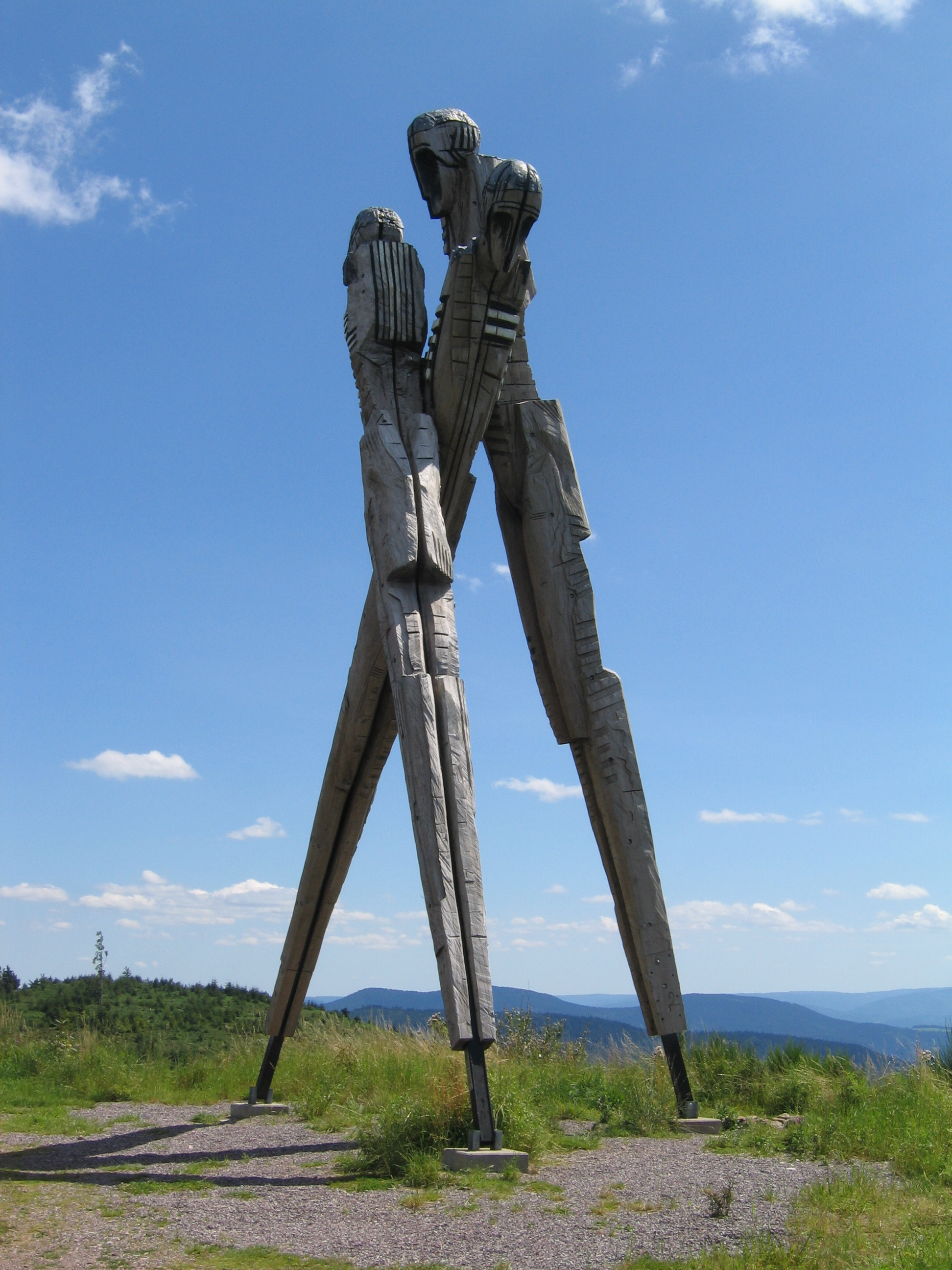
Hurricane Lothar monument
