= Andreas Holm =

Andreas Holm may refer to:

- Andreas Holm (politician) (1906–2003), Norwegian politician
- Andreas Holm (singer), German Schlager singer and composer
