= Schauenburg Castle (Oberkirch) =

Ruined castle in Oberkirch, Germany

- Schauenburg
- Oberkirch-Gaisbach, Germany
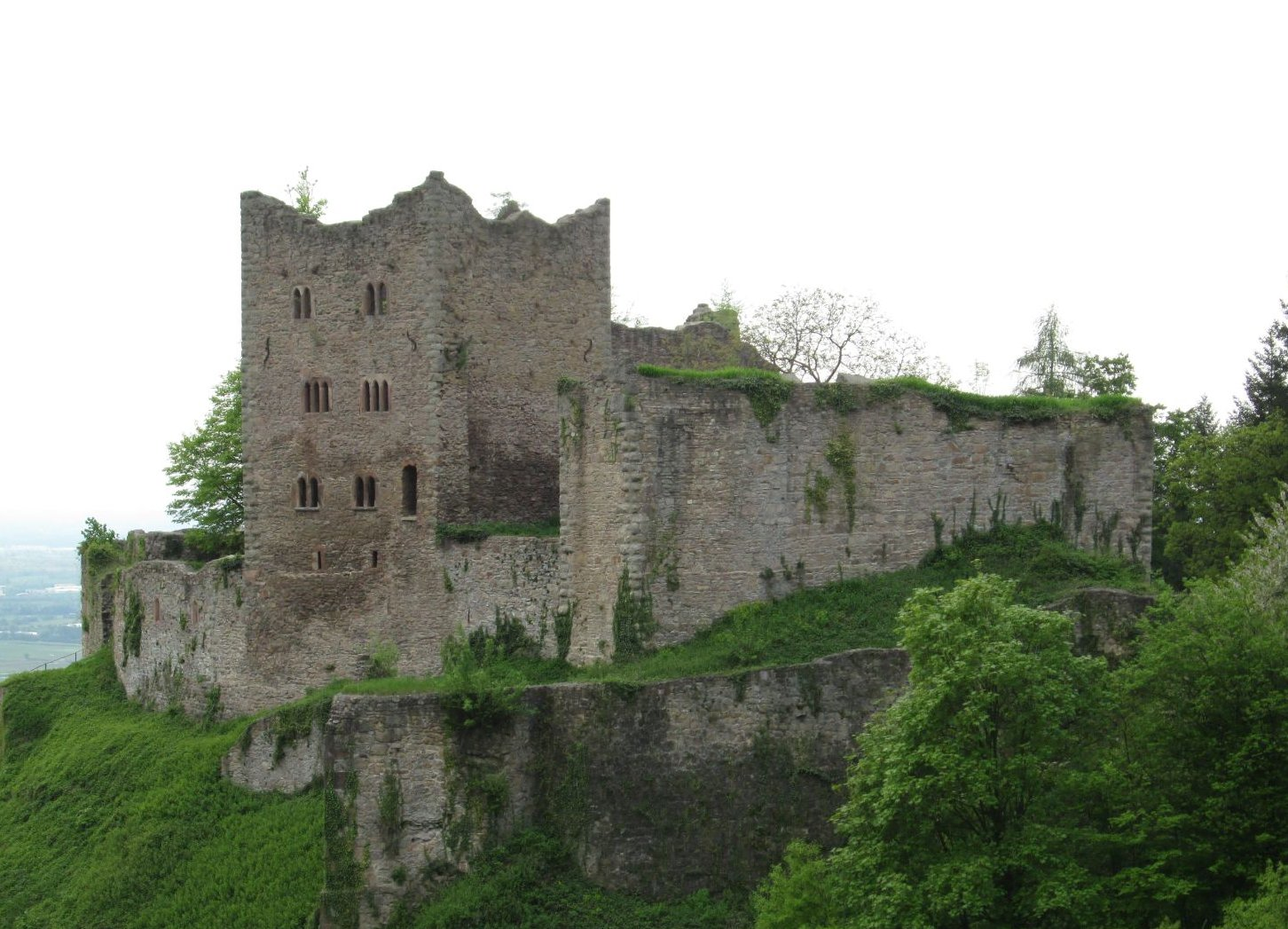

Site information
- Type: Hill castle, spur castle
- Code: DE-BW
- Condition: Ruin

Location
- Coordinates: 48°32′22.2″N 8°5′40.2″E
- Height: 367 m above sea level (NN)

Site history
- Built: c. 1070-1090

Schauenburg Castle is a ruined hilltop castle located in Oberkirch, Germany, atop a 367-metre-high (1,204 ft) (NN) hill spur overlooking the Rench river valley above the town of Gaisbach, Baden-Württemberg. The castle was built by Duke Berthold II of Zähringen.

The well-preserved ruin includes the remains of two towers with living quarters, a gate tower, a rampart, and a shield wall with an attached chapel. (Note: The original castle included at least one additional tower with living quarters.) The remains of an outer bailey are surrounded by a dry moat and a second shield wall.

The castle is now a tourist attraction and includes a small museum in the cellar of the former castle chapel and a restaurant.

== History ==
Schauenburg Castle was built in the 10th century by Duke Berthold II of Zähringen and was first mentioned in a written text in 1120. The Palatinate, Gottfried von Calw (d 1131, Count of Calw, Count-Palatine of bei Rhein, 1113–1126) came into possession of the castle through his marriage to Liutgard von Zähringen. On his death it passed to his granddaughter Uta, Duchess of Eberstein. Schauenburg Castle is noted as a part of the dowry upon her marriage to Duke Welf VI, a brother of Henry X, Duke of Bavaria in 1131. After Uta's death, the Sindelfinger Chronicles note that the castle passed to Uta's brother Eberhard, founder of the All Saints' Abbey. Schauenburg Castle remained in the possession of the Counts of Eberstein until the financial ruin of Wolf von Eberstein. In 1386, half of the possessions of the Ebersteins, including Schauenburg Castle, was sold to Rudolf VII, Margrave of Baden-Baden (d. 1391).

The knights of Schauenburg became a separate noble family, working as Ministerialis and Burgmann under the Ebersteins. After the death of Ludwig Winterbach von Schauenburg, the last of his line, there was a dispute between Heinrich Truchseß von Höfingen and the other line of the Schauenburg family as to who possessed the fiefdom. The family Schauenburg wanted the Schauenburg to remain a Ganerbenburg, whereas Heinrich wanted sole fiefdom. This led to the Feud of the lords of Schauenburg with Bernhard von Baden, a two-year war from 1402 to 1403. This resulted, in 1404, with Schauenburg Castle remaining with the Eberstein family.

During its time as an active castle, it was besieged many times and overrun twice. After at least two different demolitions (probably during 1689 by Vauban and Mélac in the Nine Years' War) the castle was ruined and, in the 17th century, stones from the castle were used in the building of Gaisbach Castle by Hans Jakob Christoffel von Grimmelshausen, the author of the Baroque satire Simplicius Simplicissimus. The castle has been a preserved ruin since the 18th century and today the castle is owned by the Freiherren von Schauenburg.
