= Lichtenthal Abbey =

Cistercian nunnery in Baden-Baden, Germany

Coordinates: 48°44′43″N 8°15′20″E

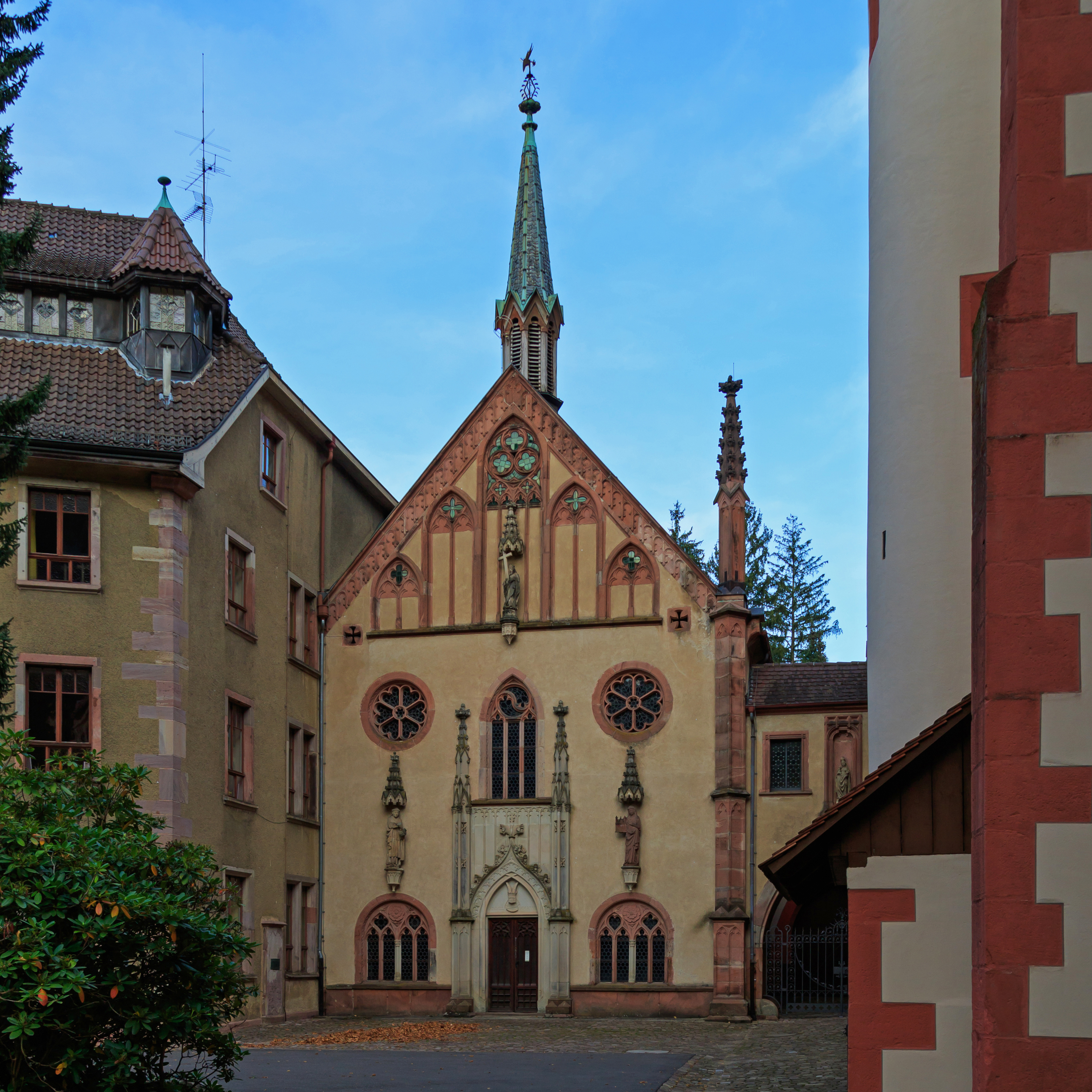
The Prince's Chapel

Lichtenthal Abbey (German: Kloster Lichtenthal) is a Cistercian nunnery in Lichtenthal in the town of Baden-Baden, Germany.

== History ==
The abbey was founded in the thirteenth century by Countess Palatine Irmengard of the Rhine, widow of Margrave Hermann V of Baden. In 1247, it was officially incorporated as a Cistercian abbey after an inspection by a delegation from the General Chapter of Cîteaux. The church was consecrated in 1252 and reconsecrated in 1322 after significant renovations. Lichtental retained its aristocratic roots during the medieval period, serving as the traditional burial place of the margraves of Baden, including Rudolf VI, Margrave of Baden. Most of the nuns during the medieval period came from nobility.

== Buildings ==
The imposing gateway, built in 1781, leads into a three-sided walled courtyard with a fountain dedicated to the Blessed Virgin Mary, surrounded by the various abbey and domestic buildings, the school, the abbey church, the Prince's Chapel and the hermit's chapel.

The Gothic abbey church, of which the choir dates from the 14th century and the nave from the 15th, contains works of art and furnishings of many dates, particularly of the 15th century, as at this time, on the initiative of the Abbess Margaret of Baden, the church interior was lavishly refurbished and ornamented.

The Prince's Chapel was built in 1288, and until 1372 was the burial place of the Margraves of Baden. Here is also the tomb of the foundress, Margravine Irmengard. Besides the tombs, the high altar and several side altars, this chapel also contains the statue of the "Madonna of the Keys", so called because in times of danger the abbey keys are entrusted to her. (The abbey has until now survived every danger unscathed, as is related in a Baden-Baden drinking song).

The three statues over the gateway are from the nearby ruined All Saints' Abbey and represent Saint Helena, above, Abbot Gerung, first abbot of All Saints, to the left, and his mother and the foundress of All Saints, the Duchess Uta of Schauenburg, to the right, who was a relative of the Margravine Irmengard. The hermit's chapel, built in 1678, is used as a mortuary chapel for the nuns.

== Present day ==
The abbey belongs to the Mehrerau Congregation. The present abbess is Mother Maria Bernadette Hein, the 46th abbess since its foundation. She succeeded Mother Adelgundis Selle in 2001.

== Photo gallery ==
Lichtenthal Abbey - Kloster Lichtental

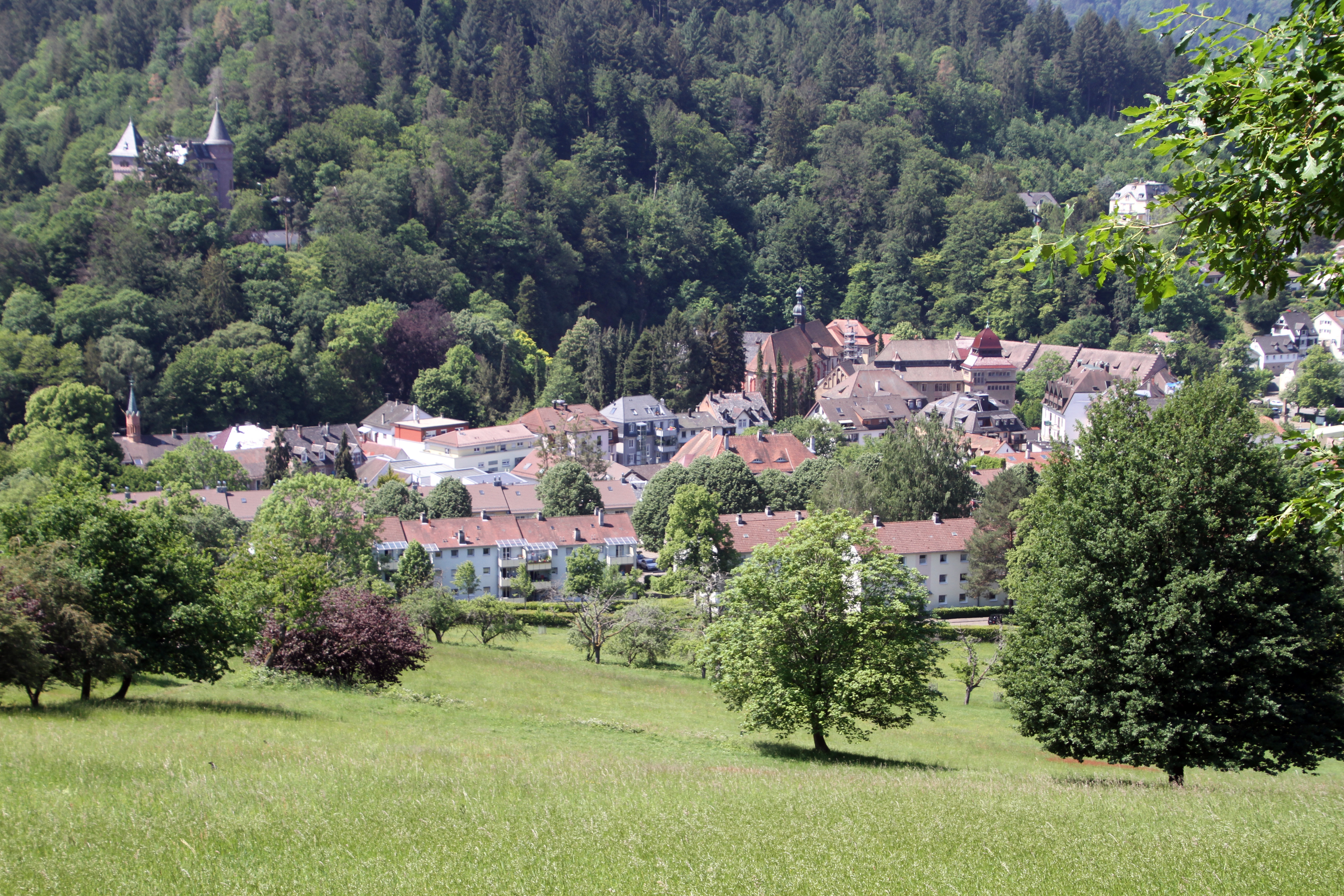

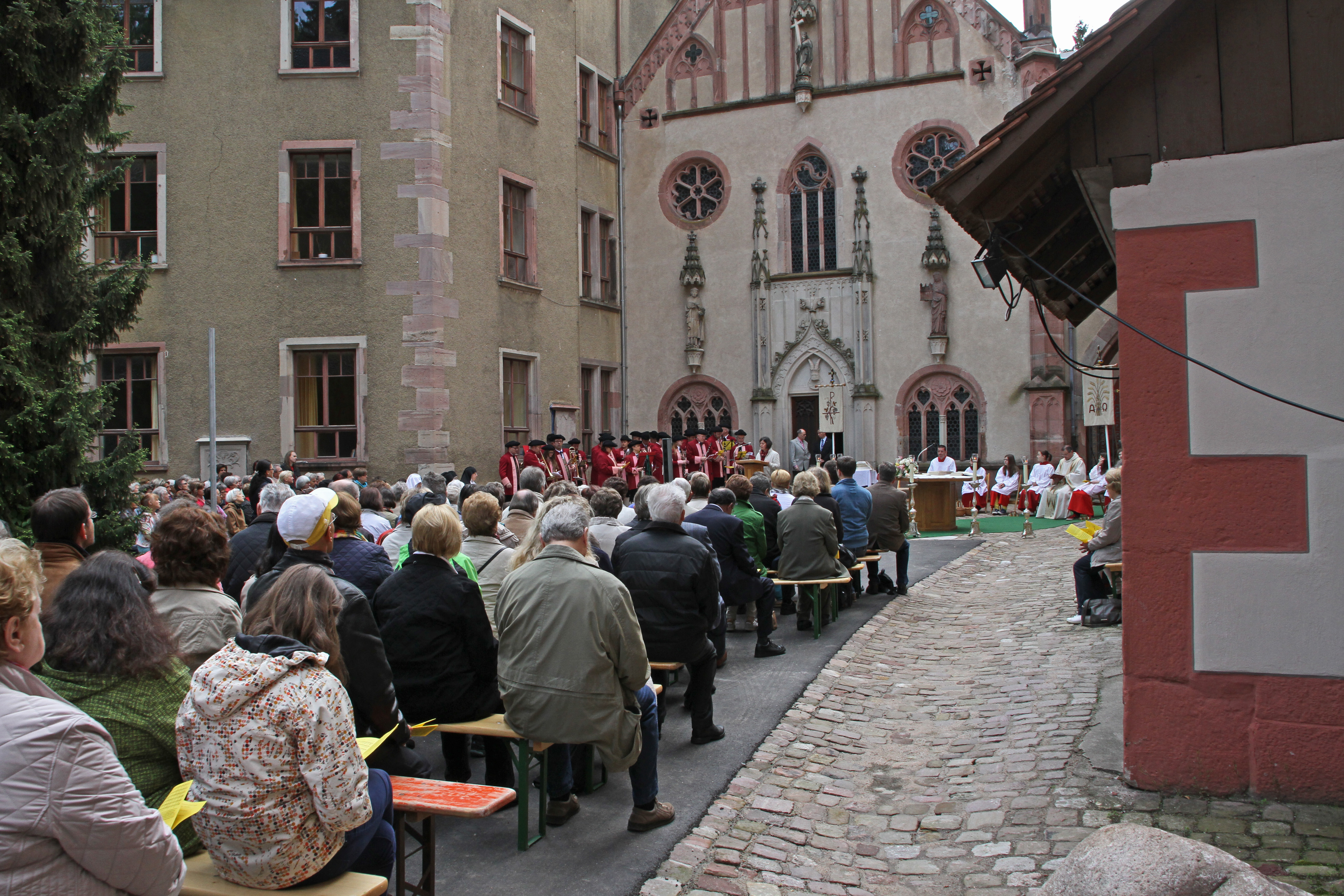

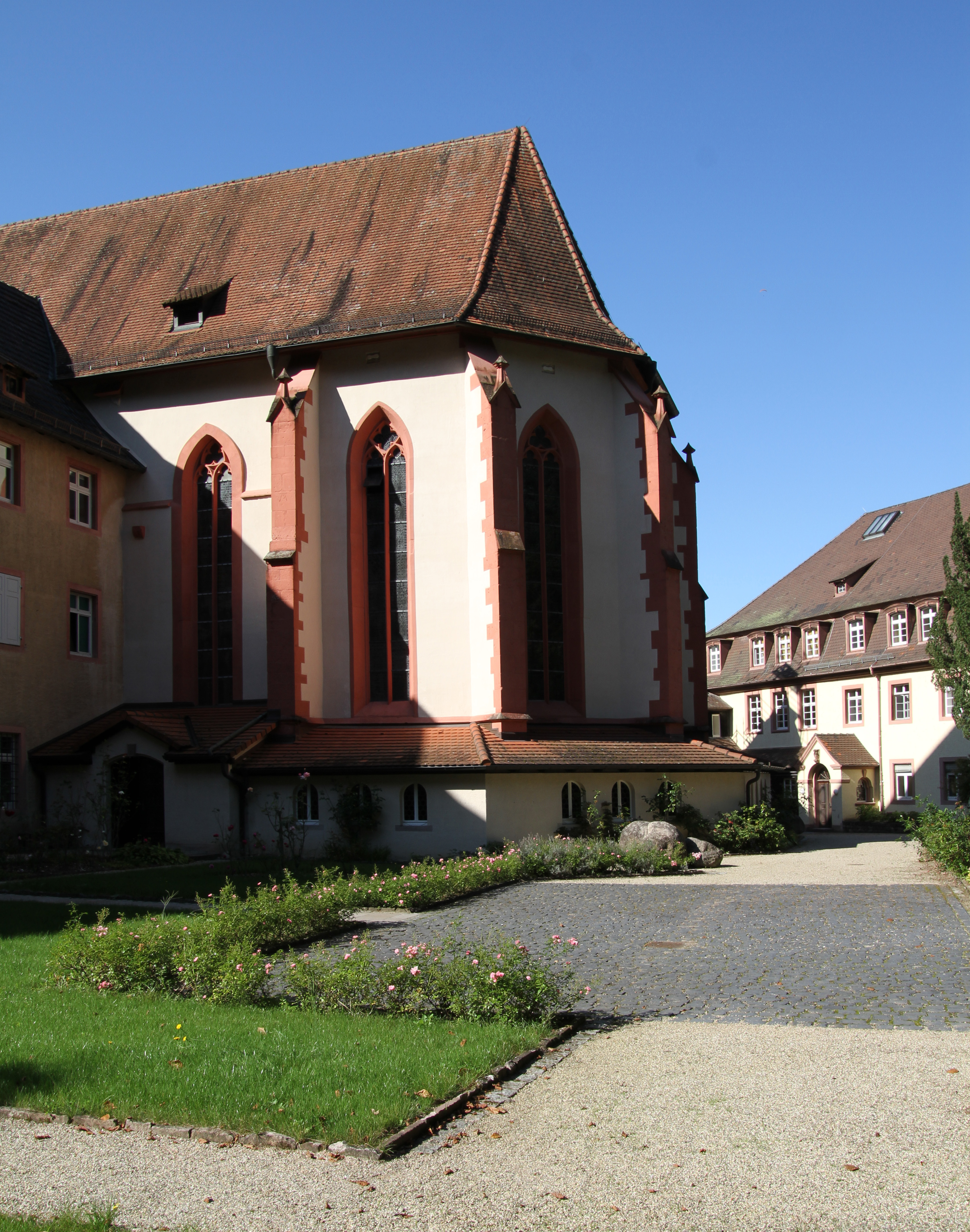

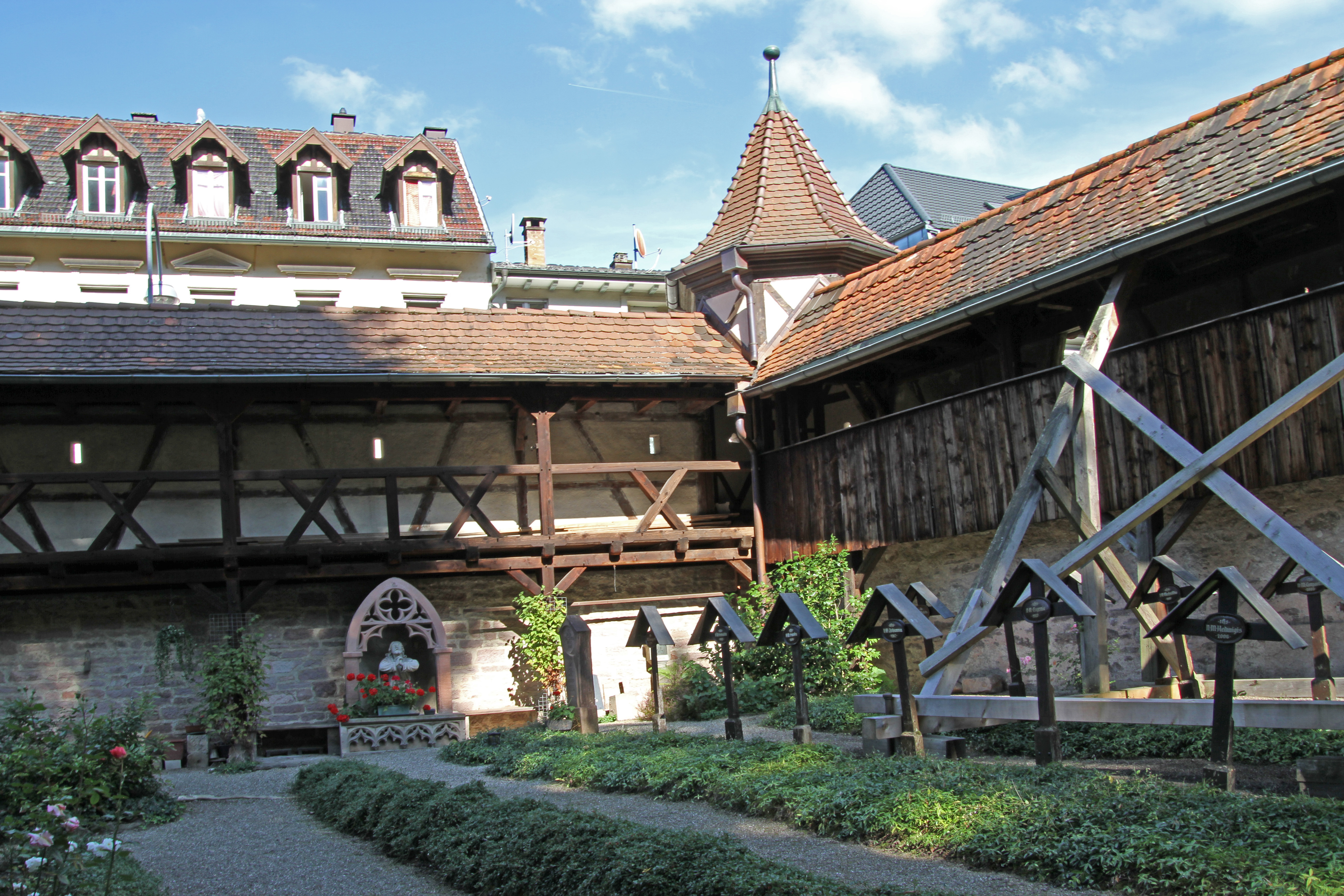

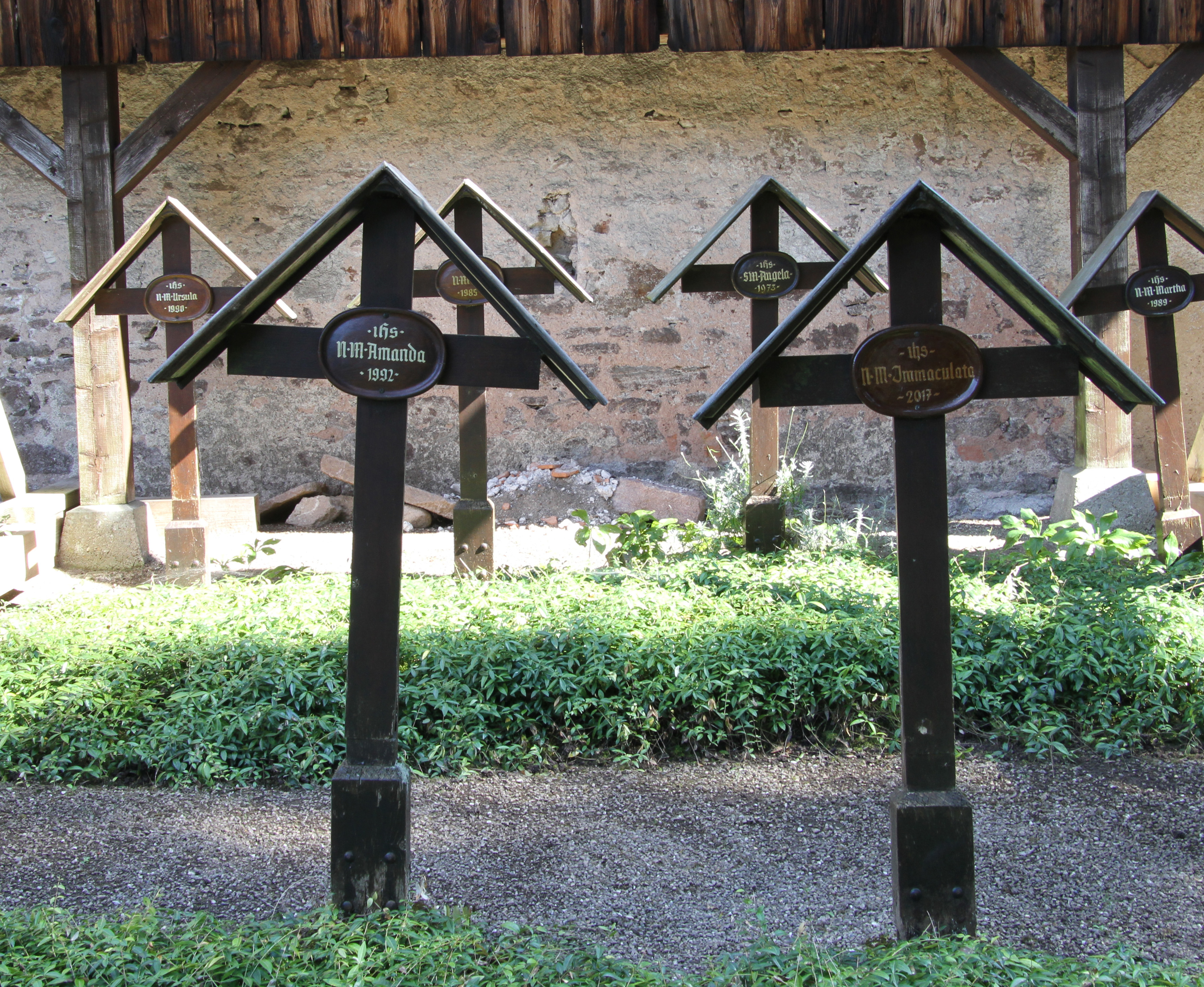

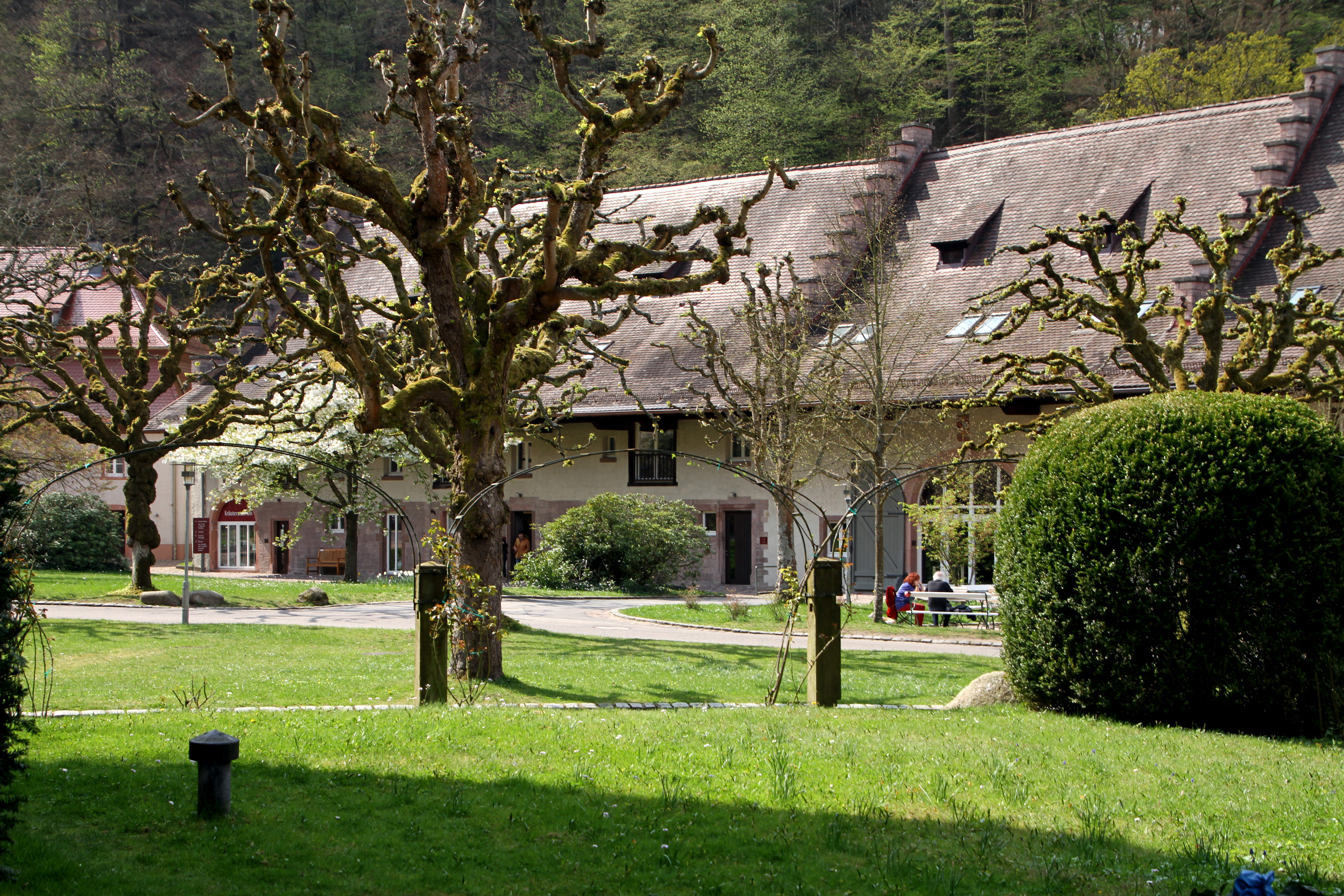

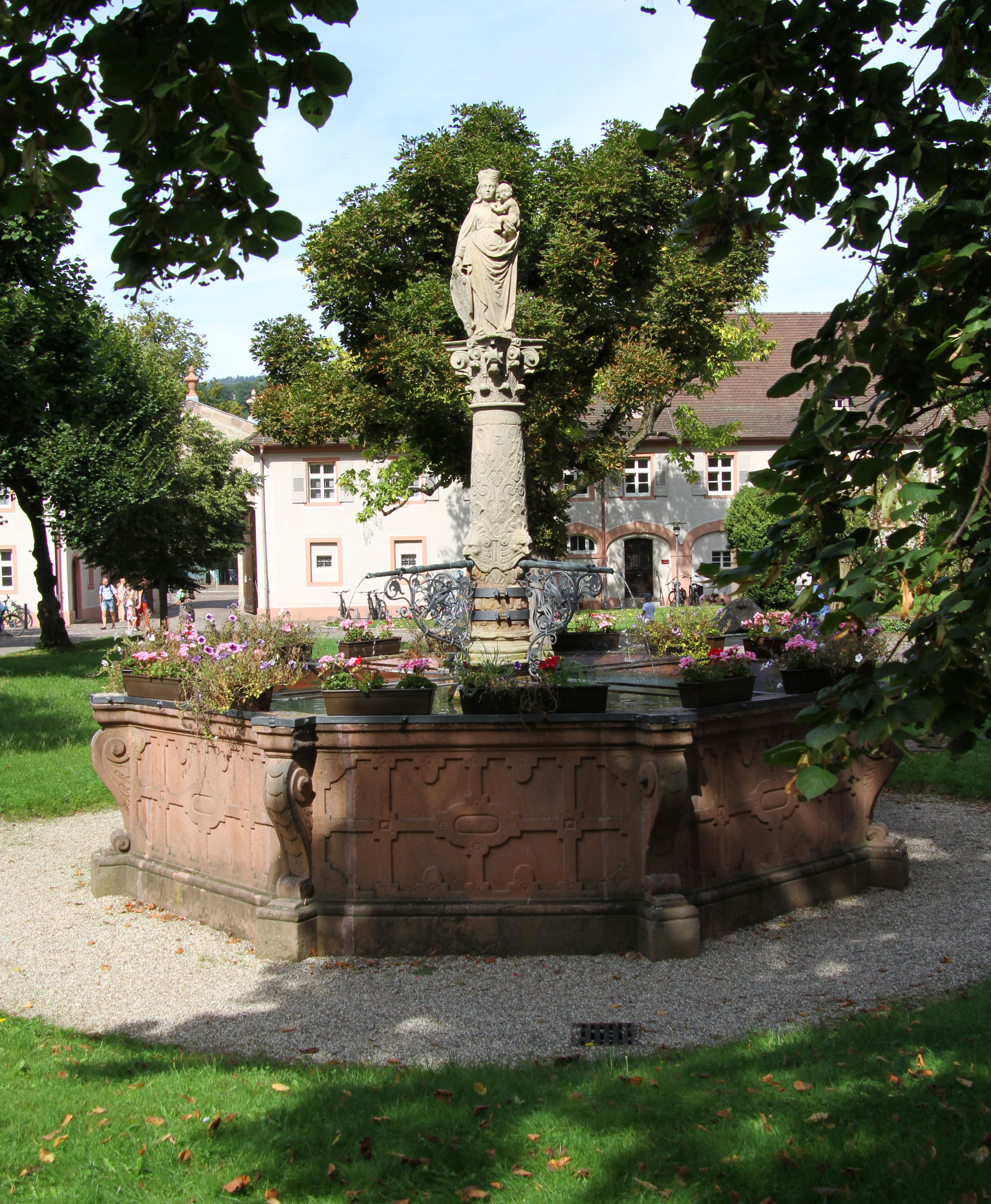

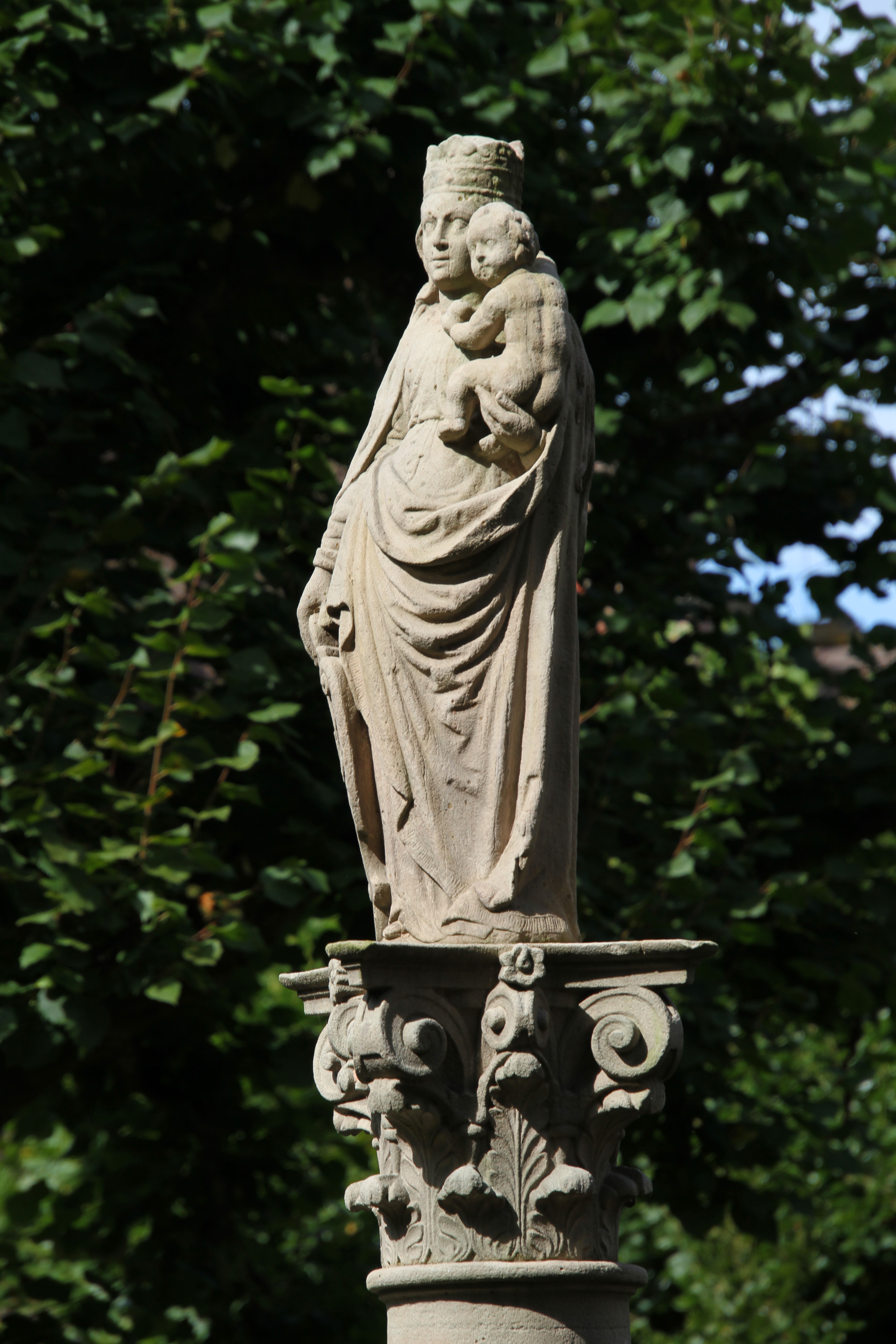
