= Uta (given name) =

Uta is a feminine given name which is common in German and Japanese cultures. In German, the name is a feminine form of Udo. In Japanese, the name means "song".

People with the name include:

== Historical ==
- Uta, daughter of Theodo, member of the Agilolfings family and ruler of Bavaria in the 8th century
- Uta of Schauenburg (c. 1115/1120—c. 1197), sovereign countess
- Uta von Ballenstedt (c. 1000–1046), mediaeval aristocrat

== Given name ==
- Uta Abe (阿部 詩; born 2000), Japanese judoka
- Uta Barth (born 1958), German-American photographer
- Uta Bella (1947–2021), Cameroonian musical artist
- Uta Bresan (born 1965), German musical artist
- Uta Briesewitz (born 1967), German cinematographer and television director
- Uta Erickson, Norwegian actress
- Uta Felgner (born 1951), German businesswoman
- Uta Francke (born 1942), German-American physician
- Uta Frith (born 1941), German developmental psychologist
- Uta Fritze-von Alvensleben (born 1955), German astrophysicist
- Uta Frommater (born 1948), German swimmer
- Uta Gerhardt (born 1938), German academic and sociologist
- Uta Hagen (1919–2004), German actress
- Uta-Maria Heim (born 1963), German writer
- Uta Ibrahimi (born 1983), Albanian alpinist
- Uta Kargel (born 1981), German actress
- Uta Klement (born 1962), German academic
- Uta Levka (born 1942), German actress
- Uta Merzbach (1933–2017), German-American mathematician
- Uta Nickel (born 1941), German politician
- Uta Pippig (born 1965), German long-distance runner
- Uta Poreceanu (1936–2018), Romanian artistic gymnast
- Uta Ranke-Heinemann (1927–2021), German theologian, academic and author
- Uta Rohländer (born 1969), German sprinter
- Uta Schmuck (born 1949), German swimmer
- Uta Schütz (born 1955), German swimmer
- Uta Streckert (born 1994), German paralympic athlete
- Uta Weyand, German pianist

== Fictional characters ==
- Uta Figarland, primary antagonist of One Piece Film: Red
- Uta Sakura, protagonist of You and Idol Pretty Cure
- Uta Utane, fictional character in Utau
