= Andreas Holm (singer) =

German Schlager singer and composer (born 1942)

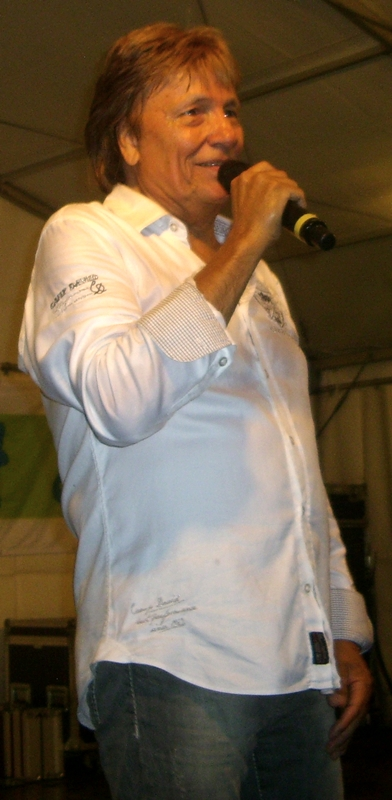
Andreas Holm, Hans-Joachim Hirschler, 2013

Andreas Holm (real name Hans-Joachim Hirschler; born 22 October 1942) is a German Schlager singer and composer.

== Life ==
Hans-Joachim Hirschler was born in Berlin. His father, Helmut Hirschler was a Hairdresser. He grew up in the part of Berlin which after May 1945 was administered as part of the Soviet occupation zone and then, in October 1949, relaunched as the Soviet sponsored German Democratic Republic (East Germany). The family was a musical one. Andreas and his elder brother Fred were both taught to play the piano and the violin by their father. When he was 12 was accepted at the Berlin State Opera as a member of the children's choir. Soon after that he won a "young talent" competition and began to compose his own melodies. When he was 14 he also won a judo championship. Although his parents were supportive of his musical talents they were also keen that he should obtain a qualification in a less precarious career, and during the next few years his apprenticeship in hairdressing, which he completed successfully, ran in parallel with his musical role.

He left the opera house children's choir when his voice broke, but pursued his interest in singing as a soloist with various amateur combos, including the Manfred Lindenberg Sextet, with which he toured in Bulgaria, Finland and Sweden. In 1964 he was given a "microphone test" by the Berliner Rundfunk radio station which led, in 1965, to his first radio appearances. Early successes included "Bikini-Skake" with Ralf Petersen and the lyricist Dieter Schneider, together with his first radio performance which was of "Mein Herz ist ein Kompass der Liebe" ("My heart is a compass of love"), authored with Georg Möckel and Will Horn. In 1967, together with Erika Janikowa, he took second place in the East German national Schlager-song contest with a song called "Damit es keine Tränen gibt" (loosely: "So there are no more tears") composed with the Petersen/Schneider partnership. From the middle 1960s he also worked with the Fontana band under the leadership of Dieter Janik. The first transmission of his own television series, "Holm im Heim" took place in 1967.

Other hits from Andreas Holm included "Es wird dir leid tun, sagst du bye" ("You'll be sorry: say bye bye"), "Bin schon vergeben" ("I'm already booked up(?)"), "Ein kleines Bild von dir" ("A little picture of you"), "Siebenmal Morgenrot, siebenmal Abendrot" ("Seven dawns, seven sunsets"), "Fahr mit mir in das Glück hinein" ("Join me on the road to happiness"), "Über diese Brücke geh ich nur mit dir" ("This is one bridge I'm not crossing without you"), "Vadero" and "Mädchen, du mein Traum" ("Girl, you're my dream"). In total his songs filled five Amiga LP records and 31 singles. Along with that there were plenty of radio and television programmes.

During the 1980s Holm's music fell out of fashion, and by the time the wall came down it looked as though his artistic career might be permanently finished. Keen to find a new career, with his wife, Birgit, he set up a "Schnell Imbiss" catering kiosk in Berlin's Neukölln quarter. However, the kiosk was violently attacked twice after which the couple seriously contemplated retiring to Spain. It was at least in part a revival in Holm's musical fortunes that persuaded them to stay in a newly reunited Germany.

Holm first met Thomas Lück in 1962 at a talent contest. They performed their first song together, "Am Märchenbrunnen" ("At the fairytale fountain"), in 1969. Since 1997 the two performers have appeared together more regularly in stage performances, and they have also produced recordings, some as the "Duo Holm & Lück". Many of the songs they sing come from the pen of Andreas Holm.

== Personal ==
Andreas and Birgit Hirschler have been married since 1963. Their son was born in 1967.
