= Dieter Schneider (lyricist) =

German lyricist (1937–2023)

- Born: 10 March 1937; Berlin-Weißensee, Germany
- Died: 22 September 2023 (aged 86)
- Occupation(s): Lyricist "Schlager music" / popular songs
- Spouse(s): Ilka Lux; Monika Herz
- Children: yes

Dieter Schneider (10 March 1937 – 22 September 2023) was a German lyricist, specialising in Schlager music. By many criteria he was the most successful lyricist in the German Democratic Republic between 1955, when he wrote his first song-text, and 1990. Since 1990 his work has been less to the fore, even though during the years of division a number of his songs became popular with Schlager fans in the west.

== Biography ==
=== An orphan in wartime ===
Dieter Schneider was born in Berlin-Weißensee in 1937. His mother's identity is not known. The first year of his life was spent in the Stephanusstift orphanage. After a year a foster family was found for him. However, at the end of the summer of 1939, war broke out and his foster parents, convinced that they would be unable to support the infant through another war, "gave him back". Over the next few years much of his upbringing was disruptively institutionalised. He worked his way through the usual childhood illnesses, spending much of the war period in hospital. There was no scope, under the circumstances, for structured convalescence or restorative procedures. One of the diseases he underwent was the Spinal Polio which has left him physically handicapped. By 1945, when the war ended, he was an inmate at the Evangelical Johannes Orphanage in Berlin-Spandau, where he witnessed the destructive final months of the fighting and the arrival of the Soviet troops. But he had survived. The foster mother who had given him up in 1939 had also survived and now came looking for him. Having found him, she took him back into her home. Their walk across Berlin from Spandau to Weißensee took them through the heart of what had been a city. The boy had passed through his eighth birthday a few weeks earlier: memories of what he saw as he walked with his foster mother across the city would remain with him for the rest of his life. During the immediate post-war period there was no possibility of attending a school, but he learned to read and write, partly on his own and partly with the help of an uncle who was progressively losing his sight. Little Dieter used to read the newspaper to his uncle: the arrangement suited both of them. He was able to enroll at school locally in the fourth year, which under normal circumstances would have corresponded with 1948, the year of his eleventh birthday. It was immediately clear that he was different from the other children, presumably through some combination of his natural inclinations and his physical difficulties following Polio. While the others played outside or took part in "physical education" / gymnastics classes, Dieter stayed in the class room and worked on composing his first verses.

=== Transition years ===
Sources are vague over the final part of his school career, with suggestions that he became a serial truant, often taking time out to track down popular composers and offer them his hand-written verses, hoping they might become the basis for new popular songs. This involved a lot of walking the streets and a lot of knocking on doors, but success was limited. There is also mention of his having worked as an unpaid intern in various media businesses during the period between leaving school and becoming established in his chosen career, but it was nevertheless a difficult time. At one stage after his foster-mother died he found work as a trainee telephone operator. There were also more imaginative approaches that could be deployed when the money ran out. He discovered a coin operated telephone box at the Tiergarten (zoo) Train Station which, with a well practiced half-twist of the telephone dial, could be persuaded to spit out four telephone tokens. In the context of the intense austerity overhanging Berlin through the immediate post-war years, these could readily be exchanged for money's worth with local shops.

=== Career launch ===
His prospects improved when one of his song lyrics came to the attention of a man called - slightly improbably - Franz Schubert. Schubert worked for a music publisher turned record producer called Lied der Zeit (loosely, "Song of the Moment"). He arranged for the would-be songwriter to meet up with Hans Bath, a composer of Schlager music. The upshot of their meeting was a collaboration between the lyricist Schneider and the composer Bath on a song called "Wenn die Großstadt schlafen geht" ("When the big city goes to sleep"), which appeared in 1955. (Note: "Wenn die Großstadt schlafen geht" appeared with the lyricist identified as Klaus Gross. Klaus Gross is one of several pseudonyms that Dieter Schneider has used for his song texts. Others include Joachim Hertz, Fred Kerstien, Thomas Kluth, Hein Sollinger, Michael Reißland and Fürchtegott Unverzag.) The lyricist was still only 18. The first radio successes were not long in coming, and even though what followed was by no means a one-way street to fame and fortune, sound foundations had been set for a remarkable career.

=== Career success ===
Working always on a freelance basis, in the end he produced approximately 3,000 song lyrics, set to music by around 200 composers. Inevitably plenty of them were "bread and butter" texts, written because he needed the money, but his overall output also included many well known hits, performed by East Germany's new generation of popular singers. Some of Schneider's earlier successes were sung by Uta Bresan ("Ich wünsch mir mehr als die Nacht" / "I wish for more than the night"), Chris Doerk ("Jedes junge Mädchen wird mal geküsst" / "Every young girl is kissed"), Monika Herz ("Kleiner Vogel" / "Little bird", "Charly adé"), Olaf Berger ("Es brennt wie Feuer" / "It burns like fire", "Es kommt so oder so" "It comes like this or like that"), Brigitte Ahrens ("Wo ist die liebe Sonne" / "Where the dear son is"), Hauff and Henkler ("Heut ist wieder Vollmond" / "Today it's full moon again") and Frank Schöbel ("Looky, Looky", "Gold in deinen Augen" / "Gold in your eyes", "Ja, der Fußball ist rund wie die Welt" / "Yes, the football is round like the world").

Schneider wrote several texts for songs that were performed by East German "Pionierchor Omnibus" ("Omnibus youth choir"), including "Endliche Ferien" (loosely, "Holidays at last"). His texts were also used by popular singers in West Germany. Examples included Renate Holm ("Lebe wohl, kleine Schwalbe" / "Fare well, little swallow"), Tina York ("Gib dem Glück eine Chance" / "Give luck a chance"), Marika Kilius ("Erst kam ein verliebter Blick" / "It started with a loving glance"), Manuela ("Wie viele Wege" / "So many ways", "Ich hab mich verliebt in dich" / "I fell in love with you"), the Jacob Sisters ("Sonne und Regen" / "Sunshine and rain"), the Hazy Osterwald sextet ("Looky, Looky"), Ted Herold ("Bin schon vergeben" / "Already taken"), Bruce Low ("Ein Souvenir aus Berlin") and Ralf Bendix ("Gott sei Dank ist sie schlank" / "Thank God she's slender").

Schneider also diversified into German-language versions of originally non-German songs which opened up the relatively large German-language market for Schlager songs to the most important songs by artistes whose mother tongue was not so widely used in central Europe. One of these was the Hungarian Zsuzsa Koncz with "Endlich, Endlich" ("At last, at last") and "Farbstifte" ("Colored crayons"). Others included the Warsaw band, "Czerwone Gitary" ("Red Guitars") with their hit song "Anna Maria", Lili Ivanova from Sofia with "Bunte Wagen" ("Colorful cars") and Karel Gott from Prague with "Fällt ein Stern aufs Meer" ("If a star falls onto the sea").

Success within the world of Schlager-style popular music was als marked by a large number of prizes, both nationally and at international song competition festivals. Dieter Schneider won the "Golden Orpheus" prize in Bulgaria and the "Bratislava Lyre" prize in Czechoslovakia. Closer to home he was a winner of the National Arts Prize (Kunstpreis) of the German Democratic Republic.

For nearly ten years Dieter Schneider was the editor in charge of the popular "sailors' series", Klock 8, achtern Strom, transmitted from the East German Television studio at Rostock, a ninety minute "feel-good" Schlager music show (which some western commentators thought flagrantly copied its format from equivalent West German television programmes). Through his song lyrics and songs, he was also centrally involved in various other East German television entertainment shows such as Ein Kessel Buntes and Da liegt Musike drin.

=== Germany unified ===
After reunification in 1990 Schnieder successfully negotiated the reconfiguration of the country's music business, with new songs for performers such as Dagmar Frederic, Edith Prock, Gerd Christian, Wolfgang Edenharder and "Little Toni" from De Randfichten. Nevertheless, although he sustained his career in the newly enlarged Germany, the beating heart of his fan base continues to rest in the so-called "Neue Bundesländer" ("New Federal States") - those parts of Germany that before 1990 comprised East Germany.

=== Death ===
Dieter Schneider died on 22 September 2023, at the age of 86.
