= All Saints' Abbey (Baden-Württemberg) =

Monastery in Baden-Württemberg, Germany

Coordinates: 48°32′14″N 8°11′39″E

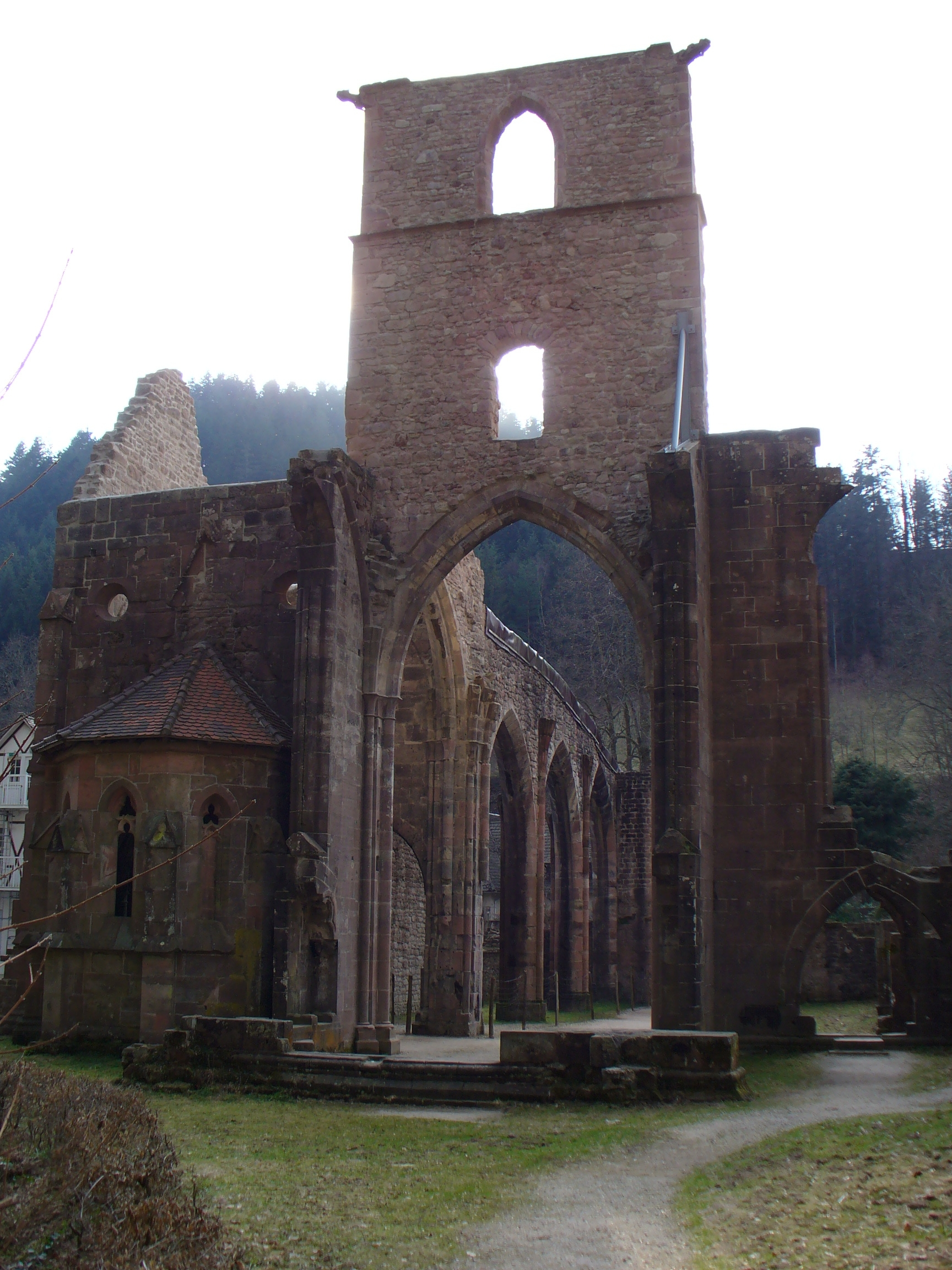
Ruins of All Saints' Abbey

All Saints' Abbey (German: Kloster Allerheiligen) was a Premonstratensian monastery near Oppenau in the Black Forest in Baden-Württemberg, Germany. It is located at 620 metres above sea level in the upper valley of the Lierbach.

== History ==
According to the foundation legend, around 1192, Duchess Uta of Schauenburg wished to build a monastery in memory of her late husband, Welf VI. To decide on its location she tied a bag of gold to a donkey and set it to roam. At length the donkey threw off the bag at a remote and inaccessible spot where Uta constructed a wooden chapel, which was gradually extended to a Premonstratensian monastery.

In 1196, the foundation charter was issued by Duchess Uta. In 1200, Philip of Swabia recognised the foundation, and in 1204 Pope Innocent III confirmed it. The first abbot was Gerung.

In 1248, canons from All Saints were sent to Lorsch Abbey to turn it into a Premonstratensian monastery; Lorsch was counted as a daughter house of All Saints. Another daughter house was set up at Haguenau. Through various gifts and livings, including at Oberkirch and Oppenau, the monastery grew rapidly and became one of the major religious, cultural and political centres of the region. A large fire destroyed the monastery in 1470.

In 1657, it was raised to the status of "abbey" by the general chapter of the Premonstratensian Order. In the 18th century, it was at the high point of its power. By November 1802, however, Margrave Karl Friedrich of Baden dissolved the abbey in the course of secularisation, and took all its possessions.

In 1804, a last fire started when a bolt of lightning struck the church tower, which caused irreversible destruction. In 1816 the ruins were sold for demolition and used as a quarry for stone and scrap for churches in the valleys of the Rench and the Acher. The altars and saints' figures are to be found in numerous local churches, for example in Bad Peterstal, Oppenau, Ottenhöfen and Achern. Three statues from All Saints' Abbey are above the gateway of the prince's chapel at Lichtenthal Abbey, representing Saint Helena, Uta of Schauenburg and Gerung.

Not until the end of the 19th century, when tourism finally reached the Lierbach valley and its waterfalls, were any steps taken to secure what was left of the ruins, which were then put into the condition they are in today.

On a rise above the ruins of the monastery complex is a war memorial for the fallen and deceased members of the Black Forest Society (Schwarzwaldverein), raised in 1925 by C.M. Meckel and A. Rickert.

In 1947 the Charitable Union (Caritasverband) of Mainz acquired the area round about the monastery ruins and built a convalescent home for children there. Since 1978 this has been used as a country holiday centre for schools. In 1960 the Bishop of Mainz built a chapel here that, like the abbey church, is dedicated to the honour of God and All Saints.

Also, now on the site are a café and a small museum.

Below the ruins are the All Saints' Waterfalls ("Allerheiligen-Wasserfälle").
