= Lierbach =

River in Germany

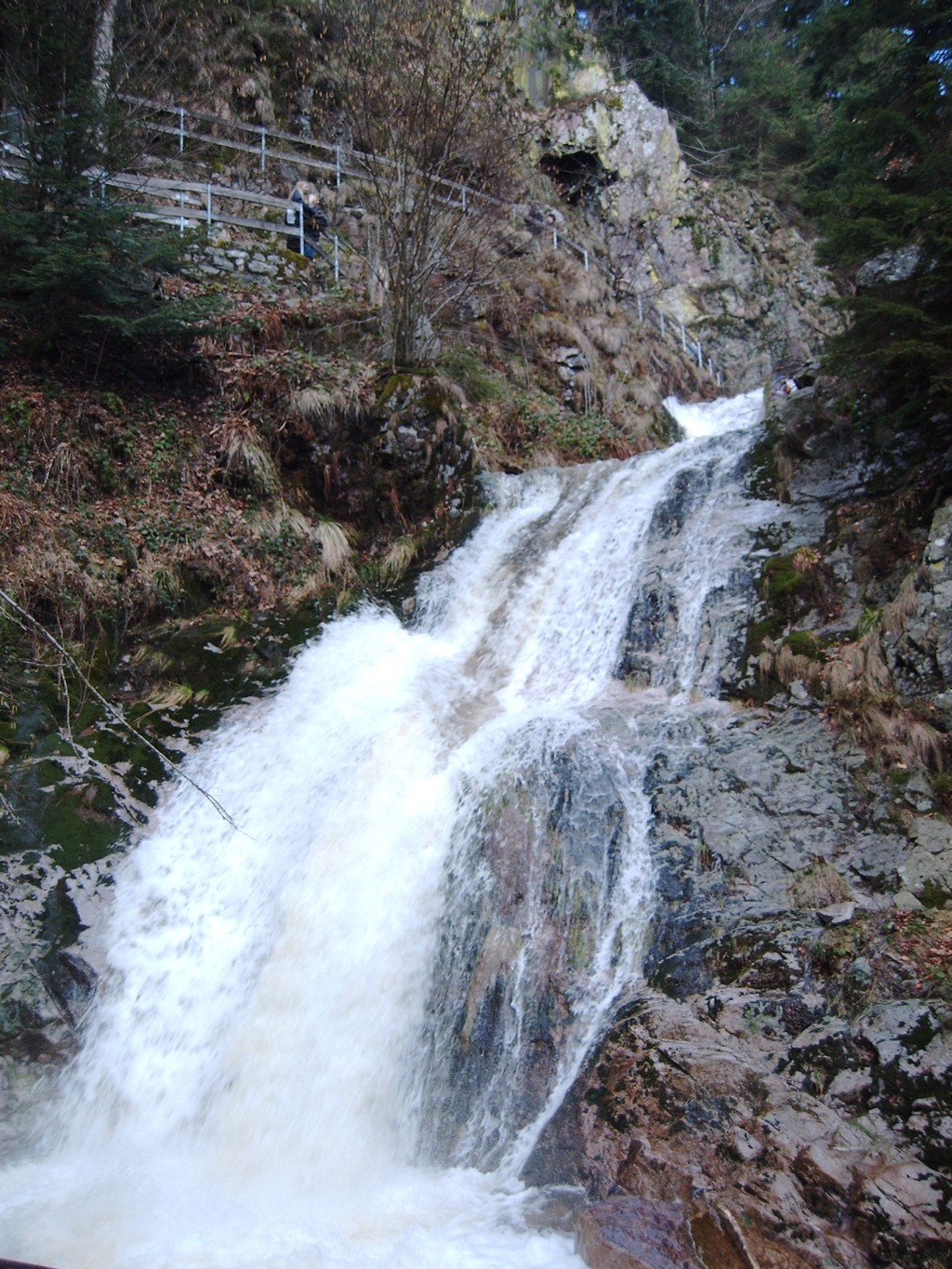

Location
- Country: Germany
- State: Baden-Württemberg

Physical characteristics
- Mouth
  - location: Rench
  - coordinates: 48.35°N 7.85°E
- Length: 12.6 km (7.8 mi)

Basin features
- Progression: Rench→ Rhine→ North Sea

Lierbach is a river of Baden-Württemberg, Germany. It flows into the Rench in Oppenau.

== See also ==
- List of rivers of Baden-Württemberg
