= Uță =

Uță is a Romanian surname that may refer to the following notable people:

- Alexandra Ștefania Uță (born 2007), Romanian sprint runner
- Constantin Uţă (born 1962), Romanian wrestler
