= United Telekom Austria =

Austrian telecommunications company

- Industry: Telecommunications
- Headquarters: Austria
- Parent: TELE2 (from 2004)

United Telekom Austria (short form UTA) had been the largest alternative telecommunications provider in Austria. Once belonging to the Raiffeisen bank and the local energy suppliers, it was sold to the Swedish company TELE2 in November 2004.
