= All Saints Waterfalls =

German waterfalls

All Saints' Waterfalls, Büttenstein Waterfalls Allerheiligen-Wasserfälle, Büttensteiner Wasserfälle
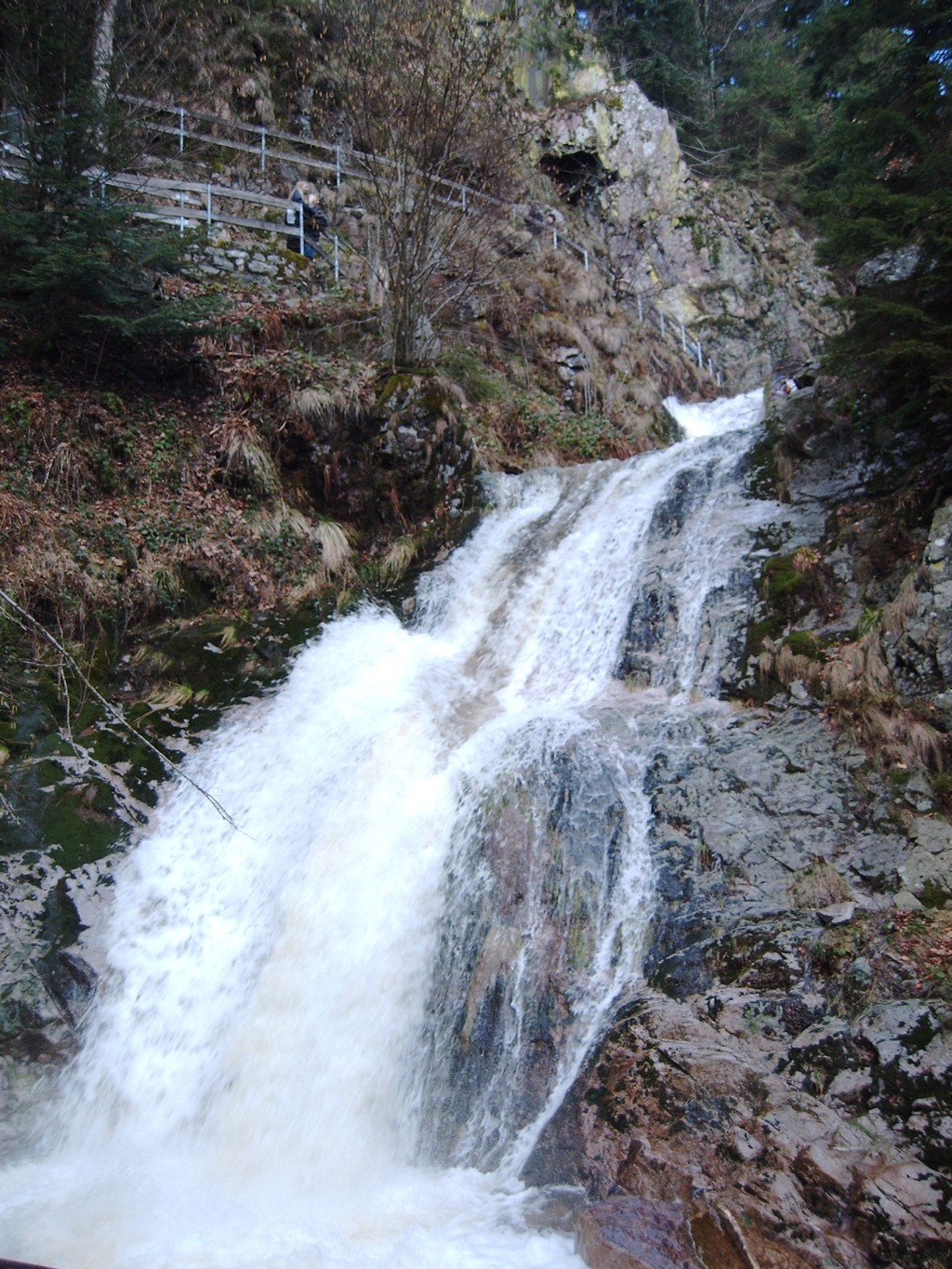
- The middle and highest cascades (13 m)
- Interactive map of All Saints' Waterfalls, Büttenstein Waterfalls; Allerheiligen-Wasserfälle, Büttensteiner Wasserfälle
- Location: Oppenau, Northern Black Forest, Baden-Württemberg
- Coordinates: 48°31′49″N 8°11′20″E
- Elevation: 574 m
- Number of drops: 7
- Total width: 5 m (16 ft)
- Watercourse: Grindenbach /
- Average flow rate: 0.20 m^{3}/s

The All Saints Waterfalls (German: Allerheiligen-Wasserfälle) are located in the Black Forest on the territory of the town of Oppenau in the German state of Baden-Württemberg at an elevation of about 500 m above NN. The Lierbach stream, also called the Grindenbach, cascades, as a natural waterfall, down seven steps, a total drop of 83 metres. Due to the scouring of the rocks under the cataract which have formed basin-like holes known as Gumpen or kolks), the falls are also called the Büttensteiner Waterfalls ("Tub Stone" waterfalls) or Sieben Bütten ("Seven Tubs").

== Location and access ==
The waterfalls belonged for centuries to All Saints' Abbey, the ruins of which are only a few hundred metres away. Because they lie in a deeply incised and narrow valley, they were inaccessible for a long time. Not until the early 19th century were they discovered with the aid of ladders. In 1840 the forestry authorities built a path that enabled access to the falls via several flights of steps and bridges. Because it receives so many visitors it has had to renovated several times already.

The falls are reached along the K 5370 county road, which runs from Oppenau to the Black Forest High Road (B 500), and the K 5371, that runs from Ottenhöfen almost to the car park by the abbey. There is also a car park at the bottom of the falls.

== Legends ==
Inspired by their inaccessibility, many legends have arisen about the monastery and waterfalls. These are explained during the course of a scenic and circular "Legend Trail", the route of which also passes the waterfalls.

== Gallery ==
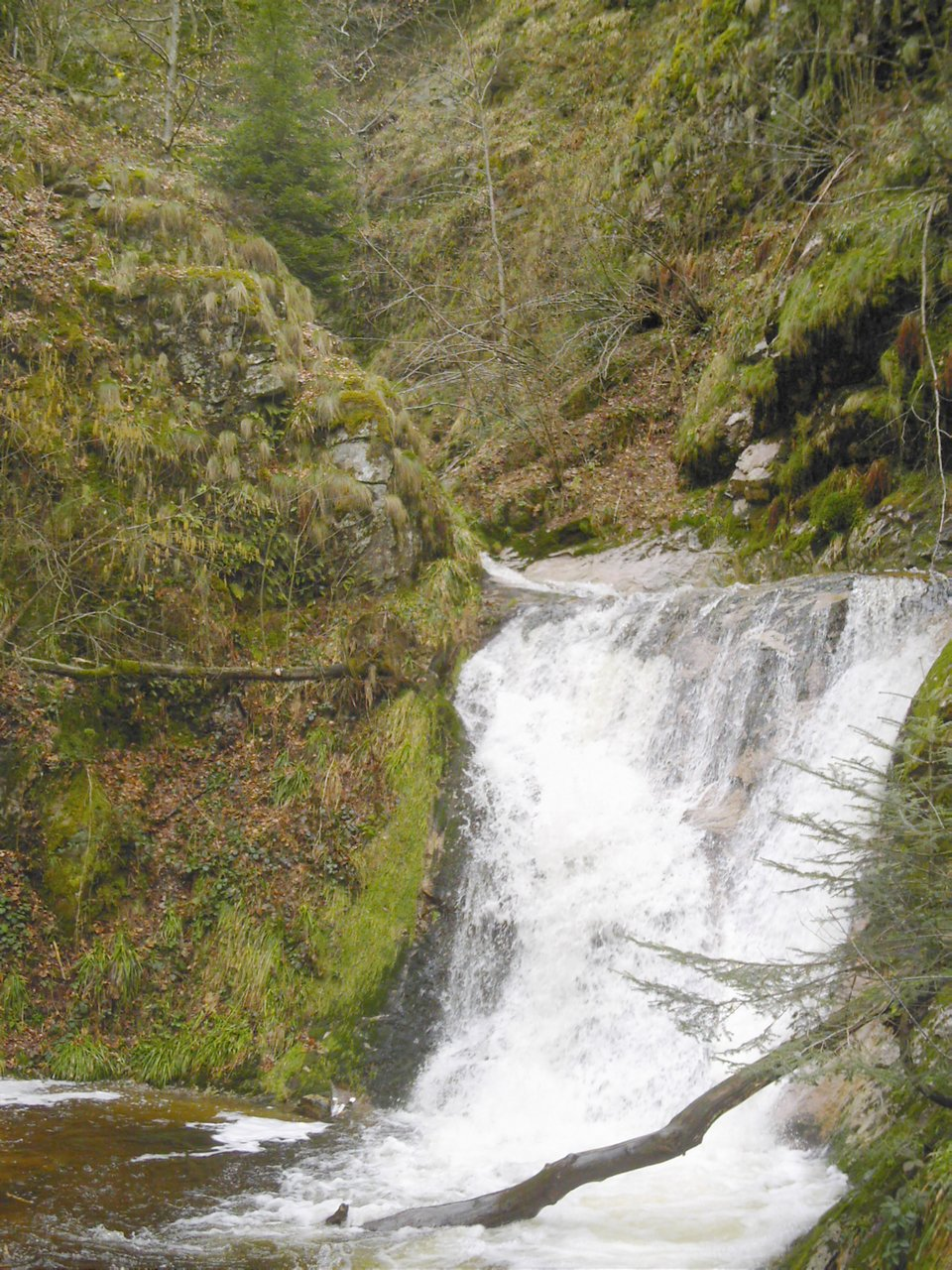
All Saints Waterfall

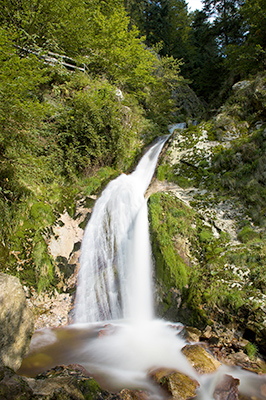
The waterfalls on 15 September 2008

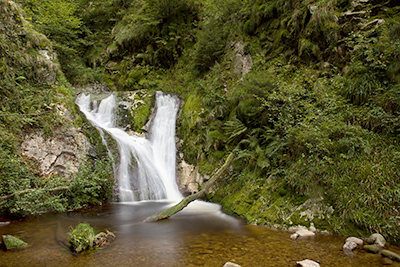
The waterfalls on 15 September 2008

== See also ==
- List of waterfalls
- Waterfalls of Germany
