= Uta of Schauenburg =

Sovereign Countess of Schauenburg

Uta of Schauenburg (c. 1115/1120 – c. 1197) was sovereign countess of Schauenburg from 1151 to 1197. She was the daughter of Godfrey of Calw (Gottfried von Calw) and was one of the richest heiresses in Germany. After her father's death a harsh succession war was solved in her favour by the nephew of her husband Welf VI, Friedrich Barbarossa, in 1151. She was the founder of All Saints' Abbey in Baden-Württemberg.
