= Uta Bresan =

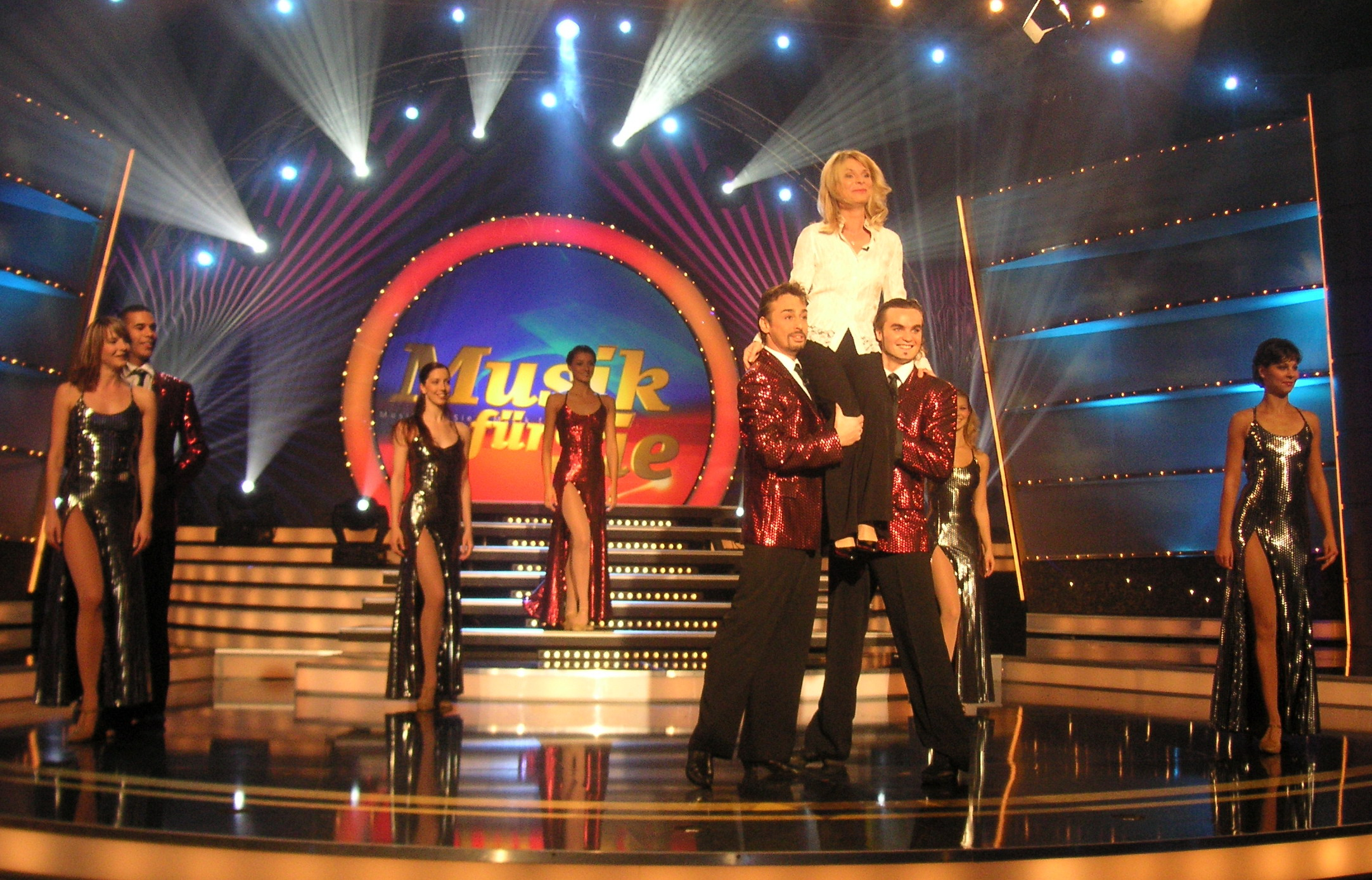

Background information
- Born: 9 March 1965 (age 61); Dresden, East Germany
- Occupations: Schlager and folk singer

Uta Bresan (born 9 March 1965 in Dresden, East Germany) is a German schlager / folk singer and television presenter. Commentators pay tribute to her enduring versatility in both capacities.

== Biography ==
Uta Bresan was born in Dresden, slightly more than 15 years after the launch of the German Democratic Republic (East Germany). While still at school she undertook four years of training in classical singing at Dresden's "Musikschule Paul Büttner" ("Paul Büttner Music Academy"). After successful completion of her school career she remained in Dresden in order to study dance and popular music between 1984 and 1988 at the Carl Maria von Weber Music Academy, at the end of which she passed the exams necessary for a performing career with a "Level I" qualification. She immediately launched herself as a stage singer, appearing with various bands.

Almost at once she went on went on to extend her media experience, with television appearances during 1989 on East German programmes such as the shows "Feuerabend" and "Sprungbrett". Awards followed quickly, including both a so-called "Silver Bong" prize and the audience award at the 1990 International Schlager Festival in Moscow. Over the years that followed she made numerous further appearances performed on schlager shows on public service television channels across Germany, especially (though not exclusively) those transmitted during the peak-viewing Saturday evening slots. The shows in question included Lustige Musikanten, ZDF-Hitparade, Musikantenscheune and ZDF-Fernsehgarten. Bresan's television music career took off not just in the so-called "Neue Bundesländer" / "new federal states" (before 1990 the "German Democratic Republic" / "GDR"), but also in the western parts of Germany from which, during the first 24 years of Bresan's life, the "GDR" had been brutally separated.

In 1993 the Leipzig-based MDR television broadcaster engaged her to present Tierisch tierisch, a weekly programme concerning domestic pets. The first 25-minute episode in what has become a very long series was broadcast on 4 January 1994. She is still hosting the programme as its regular presenter in 2021.

Since 18 January 2004, when she took over the job from Carmen Nebel, Bresan has also moderated television's Saxony-themed music-request show Musik für Sie.

== Personal ==
Uta Bresan still lives in Dresden, the city of her birth. She married her long-time partner, the urologist Karsten Freund, in 2001. The couple's two children were born in 2003 and 2007.

== Discography ==
=== Albums ===
- 04/1996: Ich wünsch’ mir mehr …
- 05/1999: Zum Horizont und noch weiter
- 10/2000: Unbeschreiblich weiblich
- 06/2002: Ein Teil von mir
- 03/2003: Herzgedanken
- 03/2006: Himmlische Augenblicke
- 10/2007: Feuer im Vulkan
- 03/2008: Solange du willst
- 02/2009: Nur die Hits
- 10/2009: Mein Weihnachten
- 06/2012: Ein gutes Gefühl

=== Singles ===
- 01/1993: Ich wünsch’ mir mehr als die Nacht
- 05/1993: Super Sommer
- 01/1994: Liebe aus der Ferne
- 10/1994: Nur, weil ich mich mag
- 01/1996: Tausend und eine Nacht vorbei
- 03/1997: Mitten ins Herz
- 08/1997: Sehnsucht kannst du nicht verbieten
- 06/1998: Feuer im Vulkan
- 12/1998: Lass mich noch einmal träumen
- 05/1999: Ich will nach Hause zu dir
- 11/1999: Ich leb auch ohne dich ganz gut
- 04/2000: Ich hab den Sommer bestellt
- 10/2000: Liebe ist wie ein Wunder
- 03/2001: Balsam auf meiner Seele
- 09/2001: Hilf mir an deiner Seite zu geh’n
- 04/2002: Kneif mich mal
- 03/2003: Du bist der Frühling meines Lebens
- 08/2003: Aus Liebe geboren
- 12/2003: Wenn du mich berührst
- 04/2004: Viva la Vida el Amor
- 09/2004: Gab es uns nur einen Sommer lang
- 06/2005: Sommergefühl
- 10/2005: Was man über sie erzählt
- 02/2006: Komm doch mal vorbei!
- 03/2006: Irgendwann ist alles doch vorüber
- 06/2006: Schenk mir diesen Sommer
- 10/2006: Wir brauchen Zeit, um zu träumen
- 03/2007: Der Himmel schweigt
- 07/2007: Komm, lass uns tanzen
- 11/2007: Sie spielen unser Lied
- 03/2008: Wir seh'n uns wieder
- 10/2008: Will nur mal deine Stimme hören
- 02/2009: Du bist nicht allein
- 06/2009: Ab in den Süden (Der Sommer beginnt)
- 11/2009: Ich möchte keinen Tag vermissen
- 11/2009: Wir fliegen mit dem Weihnachtsmann
- 04/2010: Es hat alles seine Zeit
- 10/2010: Kannst du mir verzeihn
- 03/2011: Liebe macht süchtig
- 05/2011: Ich hab’ das Gefühl, der Sommer fängt an
- 10/2011: Einsamer Wolf
- 03/2012: Zum Teufel nochmal
- 06/2012: Ich leb für dich in ihrem Schatten
- 10/2012: Wen würde ich lieben
- 01/2013: Wort für Wort
- 06/2016: Wellenspiel
- 05/2017: Kopf oder Zahl
- 04/2018: Was wäre wenn
- 06/2023: Wer Ist Ann Sophie
