= Rench =

River in Germany

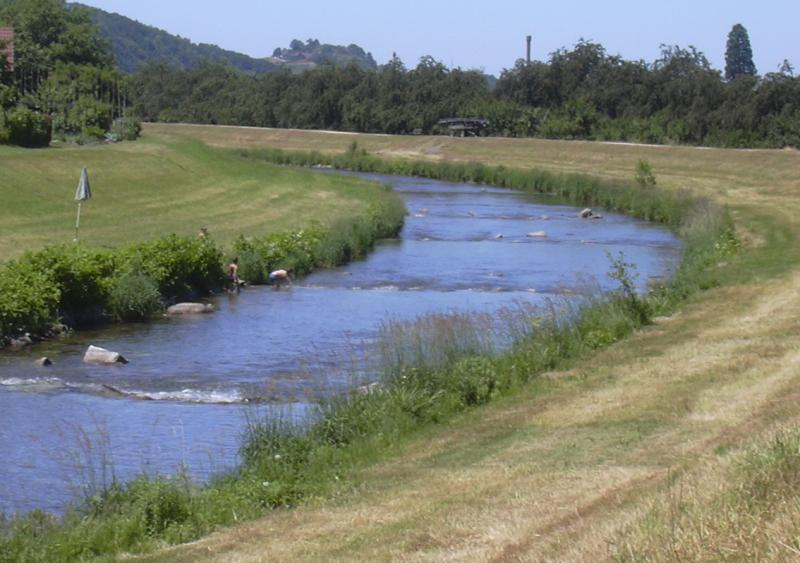
- The Rench dyke near Lautenbach

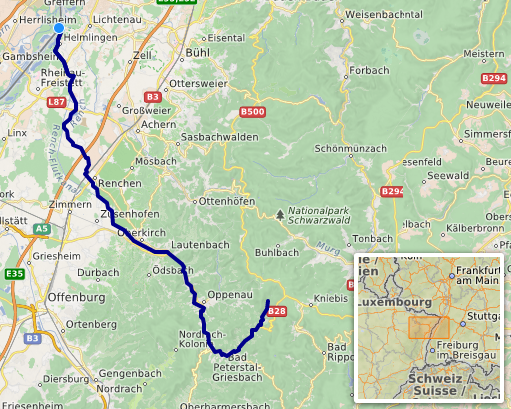
- Course of the Rench (interactive map)

Location
- Country: Germany
- State: Baden-Württemberg
- Reference no.: DE: 2354

Physical characteristics
- Source
  - location: at Kniebis near Bad Griesbach im Schwarzwald-Zuflucht source Schöngrundbächle
  - coordinates: 48°29′27″N 8°14′49″E
  - elevation: ca. 915 m above sea level (NN)
- Mouth
  - location: at Rhine km 314.700, near Rheinau/Lichtenau/Helmlingen into the Rhine
  - coordinates: 48°43′22″N 7°58′00″E
  - elevation: 123 m
- Length: 57.1 km (35.5 mi)
- Basin size: 305.1 km^{2} (117.8 sq mi)
- Discharge
  - location
  - average: 8.37 m³/s

Basin features
- Progression: Rhine→ North Sea
- Landmarks: Small towns: Oppenau, Oberkirch, Renchen; Villages: Bad Peterstal-Griesbach, Lautenbach, Erlach
- Population: 88650
- Tributaries
  - left: Ödsbach, Hesselbach
  - right: Lierbach, Acher (Teilmenge)

The Rench is an eastern tributary of the Rhine in the Ortenau in Central Baden, Germany. In 1291 it was named the Reineche stream. It rises on the southern edge of the Northern Black Forest at Kniebis near Bad Griesbach im Schwarzwald. The source farthest from the mouth is that of the Schöngrundbächle which rises at a height of around 915 m above NN in the parish of Zuflucht. After flowing through its steep mountainside gorge, it is joined by other streams to form, first, the Old (Alter), then the Wild Rench (Wilder Rench), which first becomes the Rench below Bad Griesbach. The Rench runs in a prominent southerly arc through the Central Black Forest and crosses the hilly region of Ortenau with its orchards and vineyards before breaking out into the Rhine Plain. After just under 57 km it, together with the Mühlbach, confluences with the Rhine at 314.7 km between Helmlingen (Rheinau) and Lichtenau.

The upper Rench valley around Bad Peterstal-Griesbach initially cuts into the forested bunter sandstone plateau before entering a more open, very steep rugged valley, near the town of Oppenau. There it is joined from the east by the Lierbach, well known for the All Saints Waterfalls. In Lautenbach the valley abruptly broadens into the Foothill Zone with the town of Oberkirch at the foot of the vineyards and the little town of Renchen.

The B 28 federal road, long an important route through the Black Forest, runs through the Rench valley linking the Strasbourg area with the upper Neckar region. It climbs steeply above Bad Griesbach in hairpin bends to the Alexanderschanze (968 m). The Rench Valley Railway starts at Appenweier and runs as far as Bad Griesbach. It has also contributed to the development of the thermal baths in the Rench valley, which had already been established in the 16th century in Bad Griesbach, but which soon extended to Bad Antogast near Oppenau (especially for the nobility), Bad Peterstal and Bad Freiersbach (today part of Bad Peterstal-Griesbach).

The "Rench Flood Canal" was built between 1936 and 1953 at the Acher Rench Correction to divert floodwaters. It branches off the Rench at Erlach, picks up the Acher Canal at Rheinau and merges with the actual Rench at Memprechtshofen.

== Woodland ==
The upper Rench valley is initially cut into forest-rich Buntsandstein highlands and then transforms into a more open and rugged valley, with the small town of Oppenau in the centre.

== Gallery ==
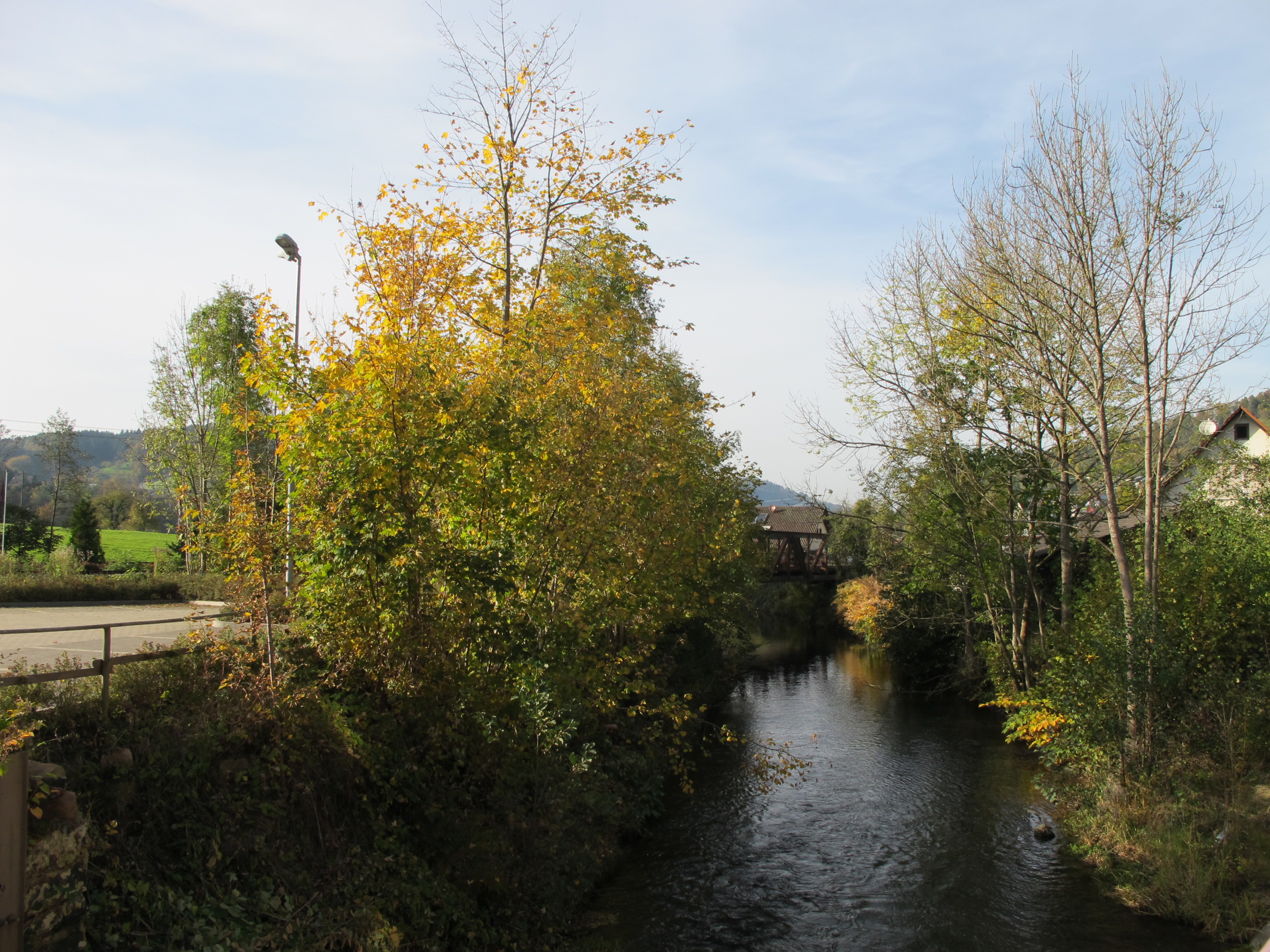
The Rench in Oppenau

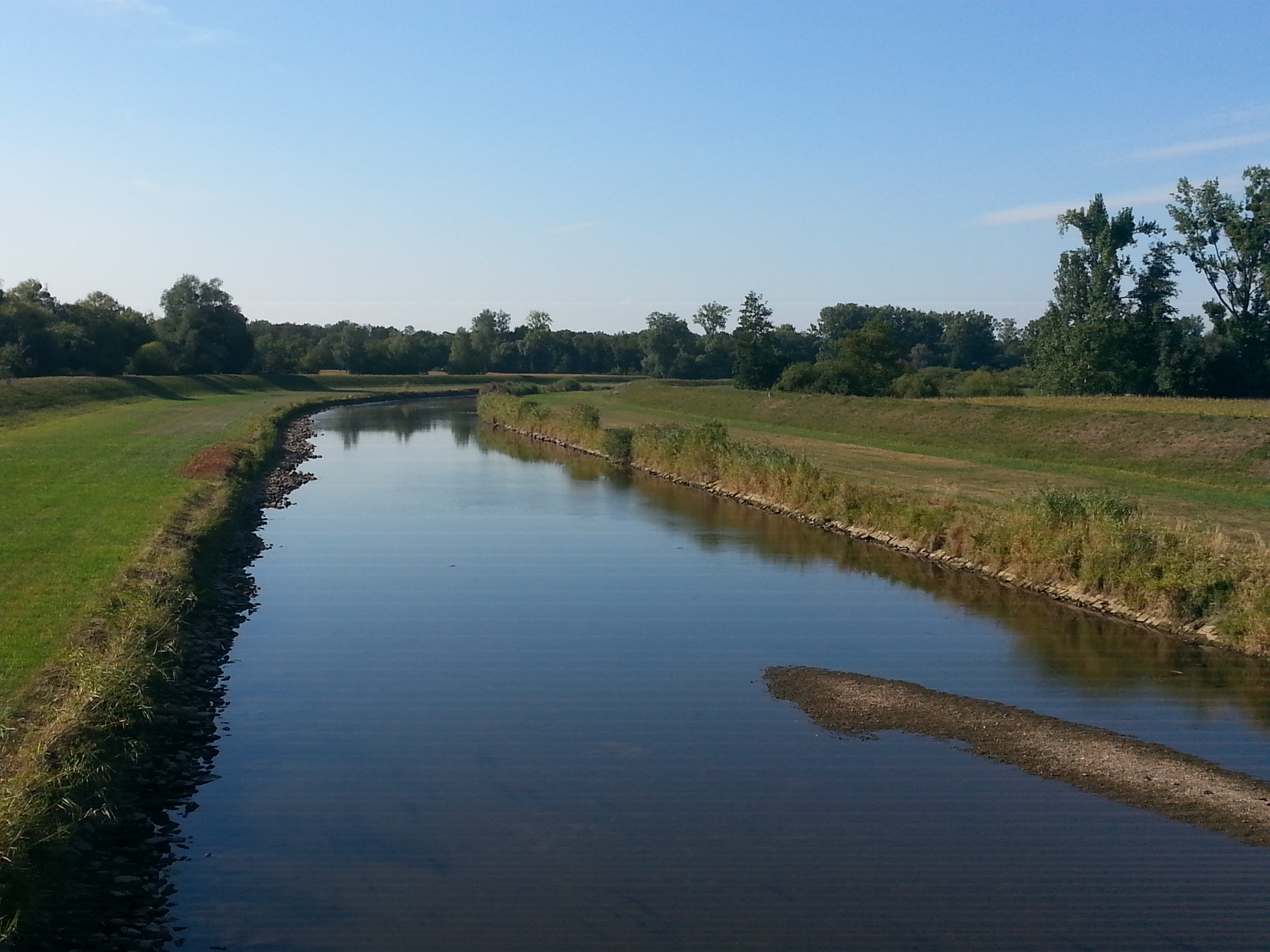
The Rench near Helmlingen at low water

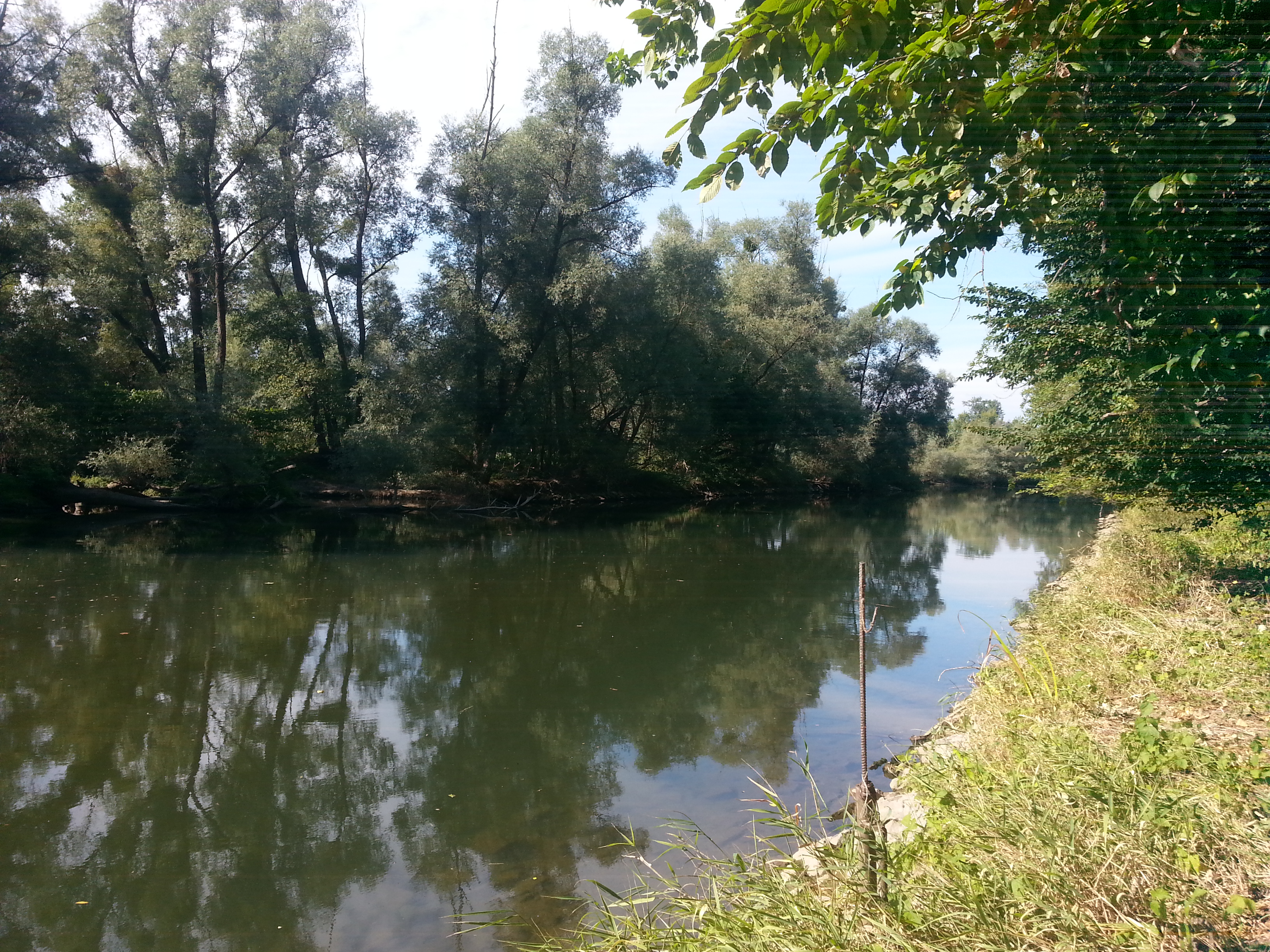
The Rench in riparian woods near Helmlingen

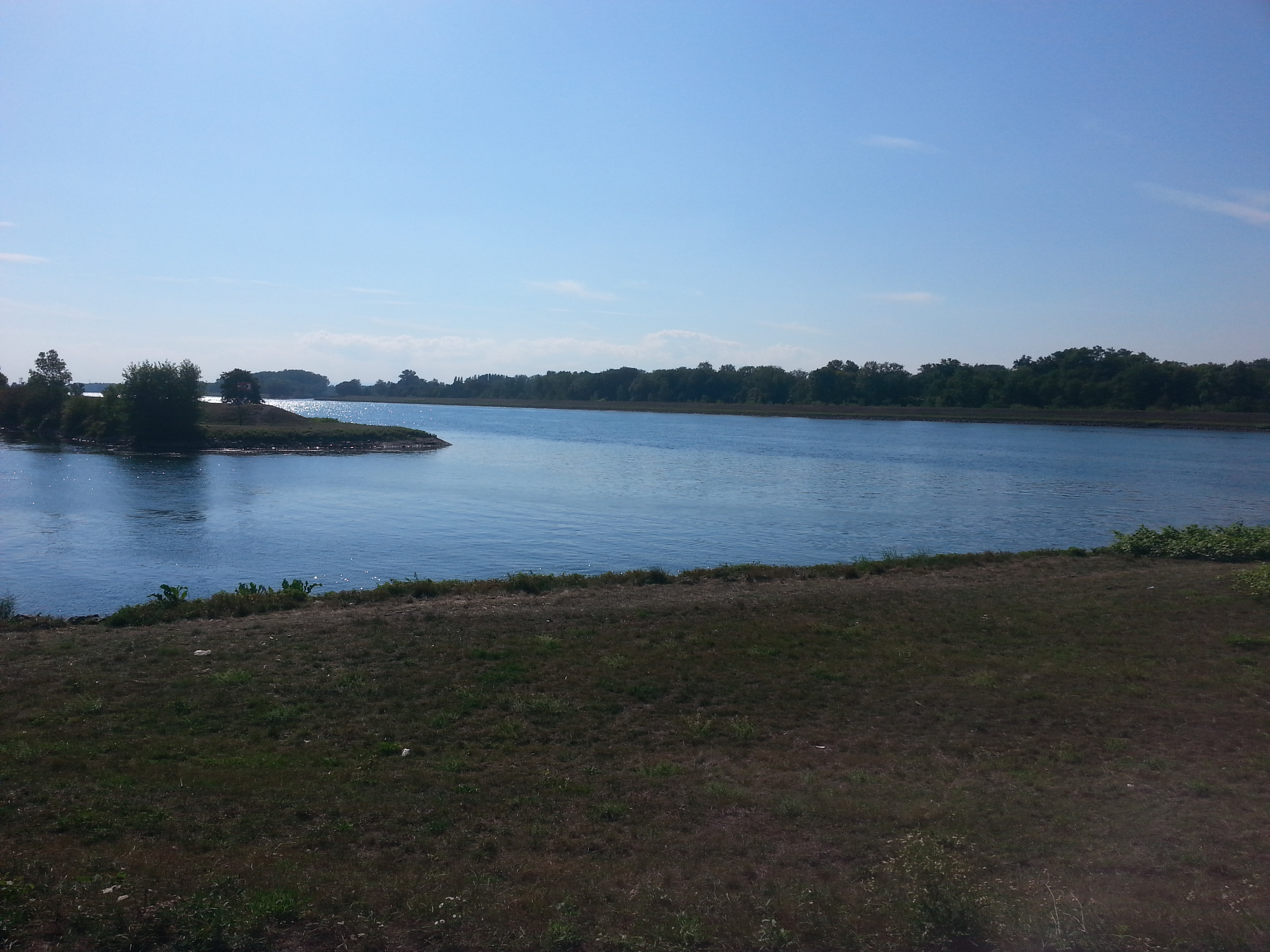
Confluence of the Rench and the Rhine

== See also ==
- Rench Valley Trail
- Rench Valley Railway
- Rench (name)
