= Oppenau =

- City
- Coat of arms

- Location of Oppenau within Ortenaukreis district
- Interactive map of Oppenau
- Location within Germany Location within Baden-Württemberg
- Coordinates: 48°28′25″N 08°09′34″E
- Country: Germany
- State: Baden-Württemberg
- Admin. region: Freiburg
- District: Ortenaukreis
- Subdivisions: five Ortsteile

Government
  - Mayor (2017–25): Uwe Gaiser (Ind.)

Area
  - Total: 72.98 km^{2} (28.18 sq mi)
- Elevation: 277 m (909 ft)

Population (2025-12-31)
  - Total: 4,813
  - Density: 65.95/km^{2} (170.8/sq mi)
- Time zone: UTC+01:00 (CET)
  - Summer (DST): UTC+02:00 (CEST)
- Postal codes: 77724–77728
- Dialling codes: 07804
- Vehicle registration: OG, BH, KEL, LR, WOL
- Website: www.oppenau.de

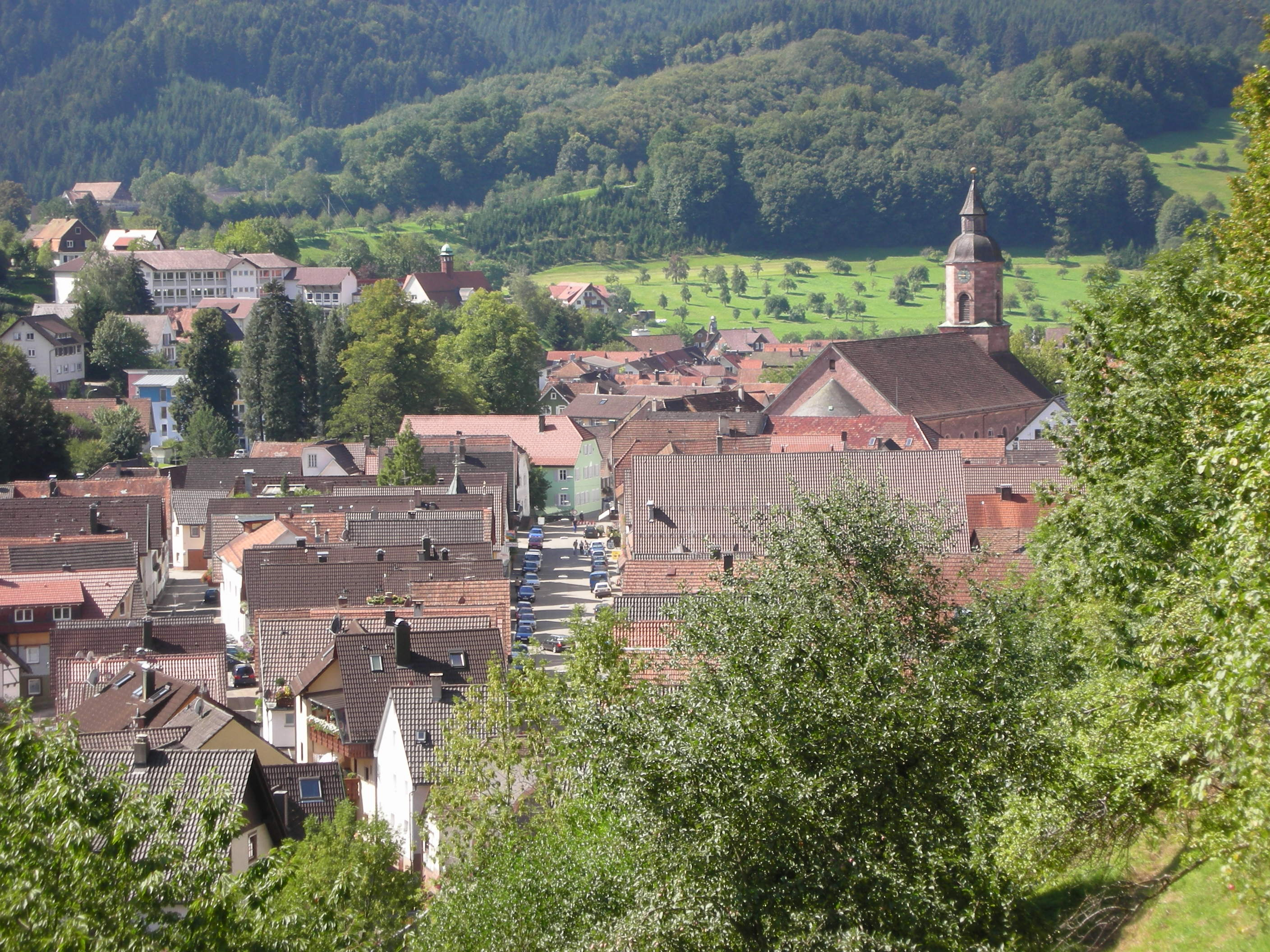
View on Main city

Oppenau (German: [ˈɔpənaʊ]) is a city located in the state of Baden-Württemberg, Germany. It has a population of 4,700 inhabitants.

== Geography ==
Oppenau is situated in the Rench valley in the Black Forest. The nearest major cities are Offenburg and Freudenstadt.

== History ==
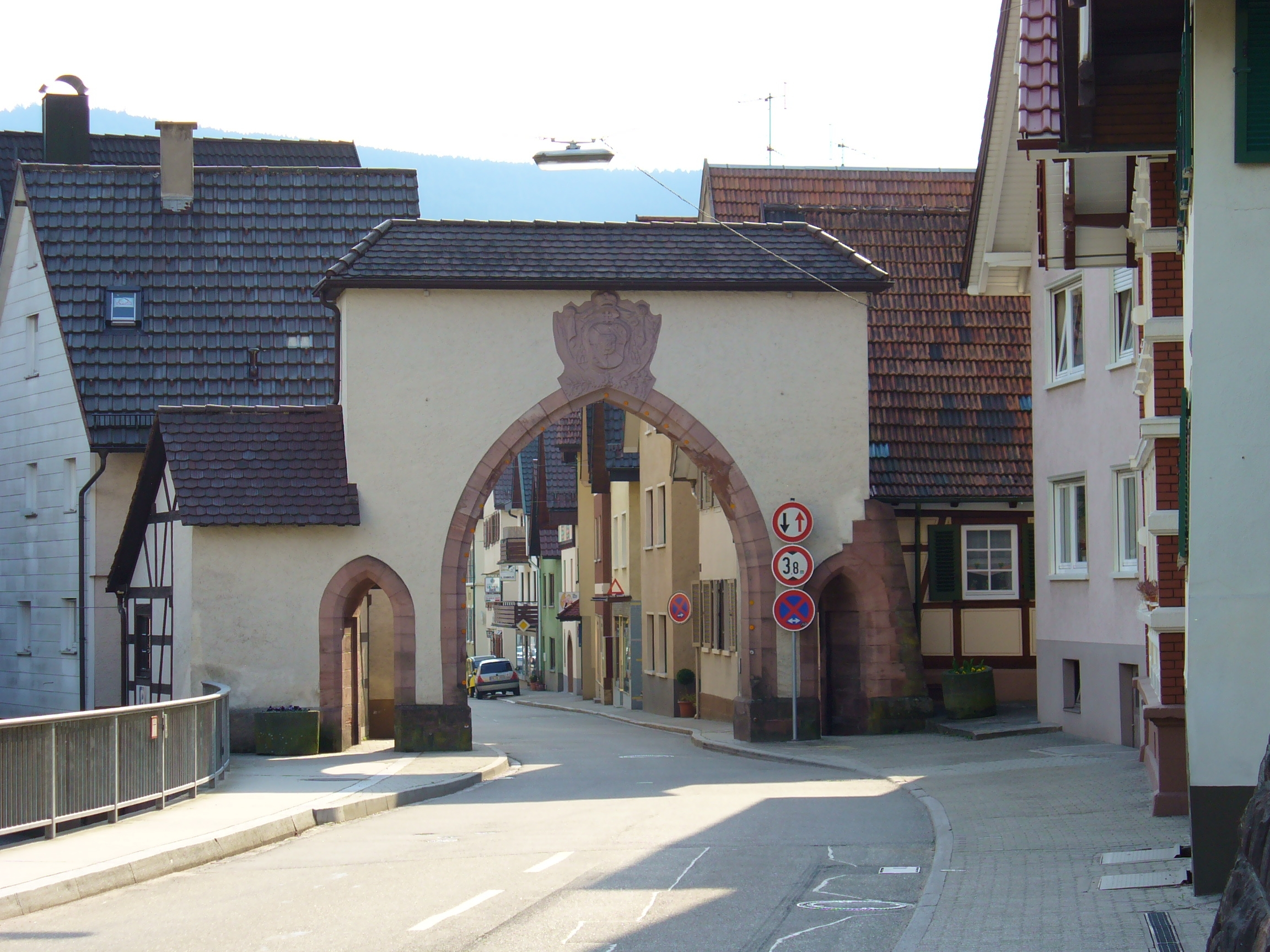
City gate

In the 12th century an agricultural settling made up the village Noppenouwe, which succumbed to the House of Zähringen until 1218. After they have been died out, the dominance in the Rench-valley was fragmented. The in 1192 in Lierbach founded All Saints’ Abbey took a high political, cultural and religious influence to Oppenau at this time. In 1316 bishops from the French Strasbourg started reign about the Rench-valley.

After the Reichsdeputationshauptschluss in 1803, Oppenau became part of Baden.

In 1990, German politician Wolfgang Schäuble suffered an assassination attempt in Oppenau.

== Culture ==
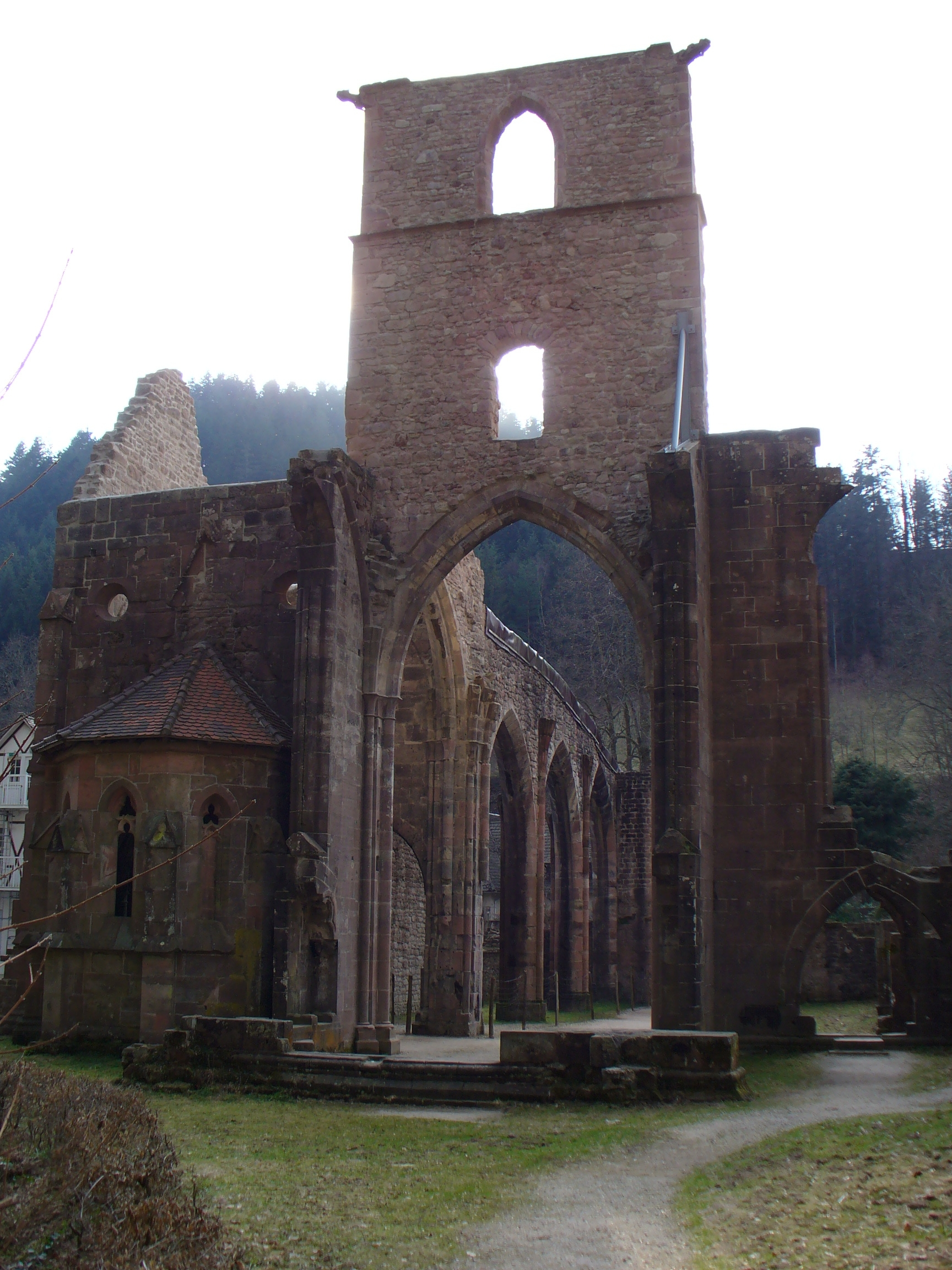
Ruins of All Saints' Abbey

Oppenau's main attractions are the ruins of the All Saints' Abbey, which was destroyed by fire in 1804, and the All Saints Waterfalls close to them.
