= Peter Hemmel of Andlau =

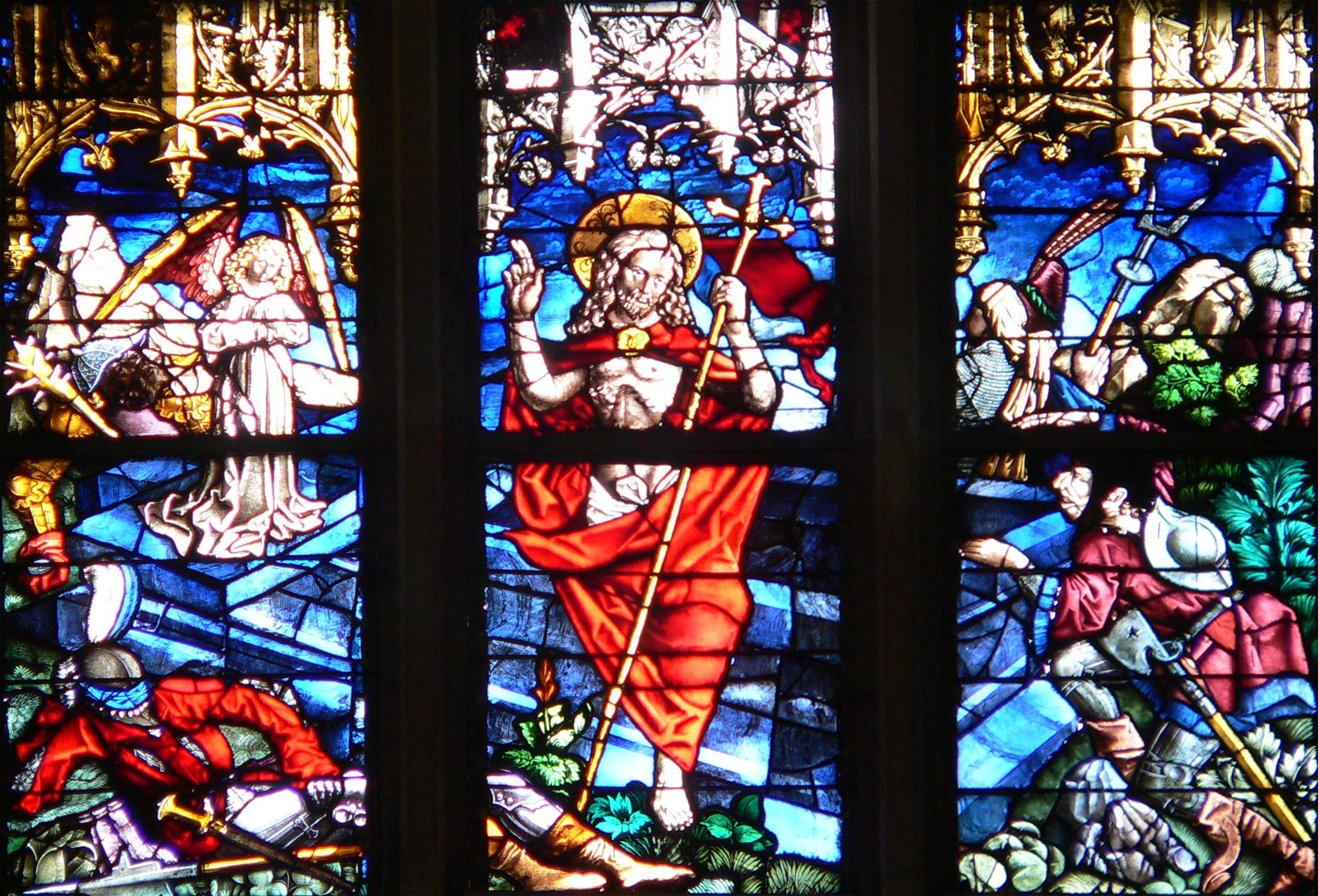
The Resurrected Christ - detail from the Council Window of 1480 in Ulm Minster.

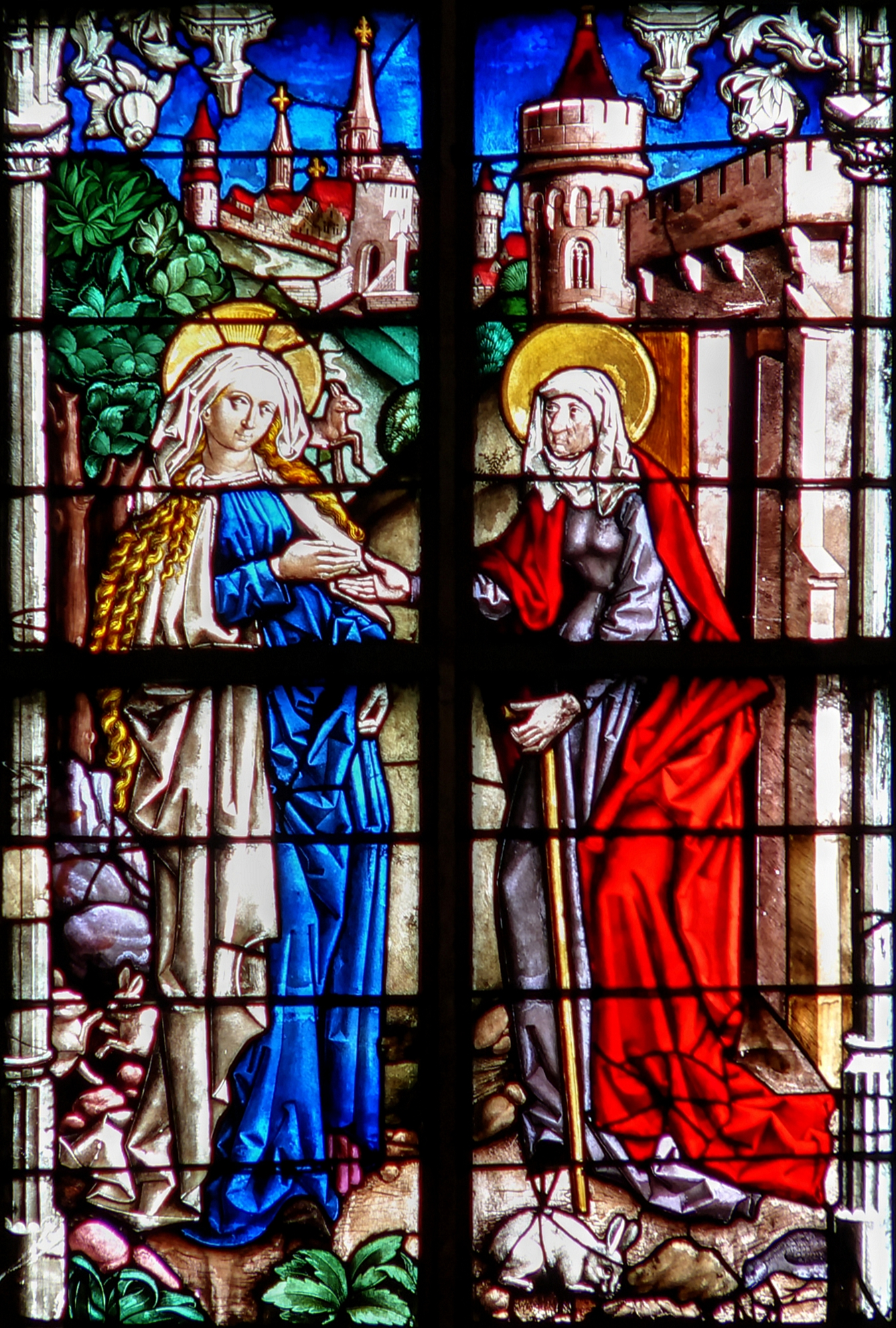
Detail from the 1480 Guilds Window in Ulm Minster, showing the Visitation.

Peter Hemmel of Andlau (c. 1420–1506) was a late Gothic stained glass artist, whose workshop in Strasbourg was active between 1447 and 1501. Sometimes working alone and sometimes in collaboration with other stained-glass artists in the city, it mainly supplied religious buildings in what is now Austria, southern and eastern Germany, eastern France and northern Italy, though none of Hemmel's windows survive in Andlau itself.

== Life ==
Hemmel was born in Andlau, now in the Bas-Rhin region of France, but became a citizen of Strasbourg as well as a landowner and counsellor. A document of 1466 refers to him marrying the widow of the painter Hans Hirtz. He died in Strasbourg.

Hemmel used templates drawing on the work of Rogier van der Weyden and Martin Schongauer. He used two-coloured and shaded glass in bright iron reds, bright blues, black-enamel and silver-yellow (produced with silver salts) to reproduce brocades, textiles and faces. He is also notable for his attention to details, such as in animals and plants, as seen in the Guilds Window in Ulm Minster.

For unclear reasons, Hemmel's name is consistently given as Hans Wild in the prominent Handbuch der Kunstwissenschaft (1919), although the art historian Hermann Schmitz correctly identifies all the works Hemmel is associated with.

== Works ==
- Strasbourg Cathedral
- St William's Church, Strasbourg
- Sainte-Madeleine, Strasbourg, now in the Musée de l’Œuvre Notre-Dame
- The choir of Ulm Minster
  - The Council Window, commissioned by the city council in 1480
  - The Guilds Window, commissioned by the city guilds in 1480
- St. Lorenz, Nuremberg - the Volckamer Window, commissioned by Peter Volckamer in 1480
- St. George's Collegiate Church, Tubingen - the window in the choir, 1475
- Augsburg Cathedral
- Frauenkirche, Munich
- Stiftskirche Nonnberg, Salzburg
- Freiburger Münster
- Metz Cathedral
- Milan Cathedral (several windows)
- Lady chapel in Notre-Dame-de-la-Nativité, Saverne
- Mariä Krönung, pilgrimage church in Lautenbach
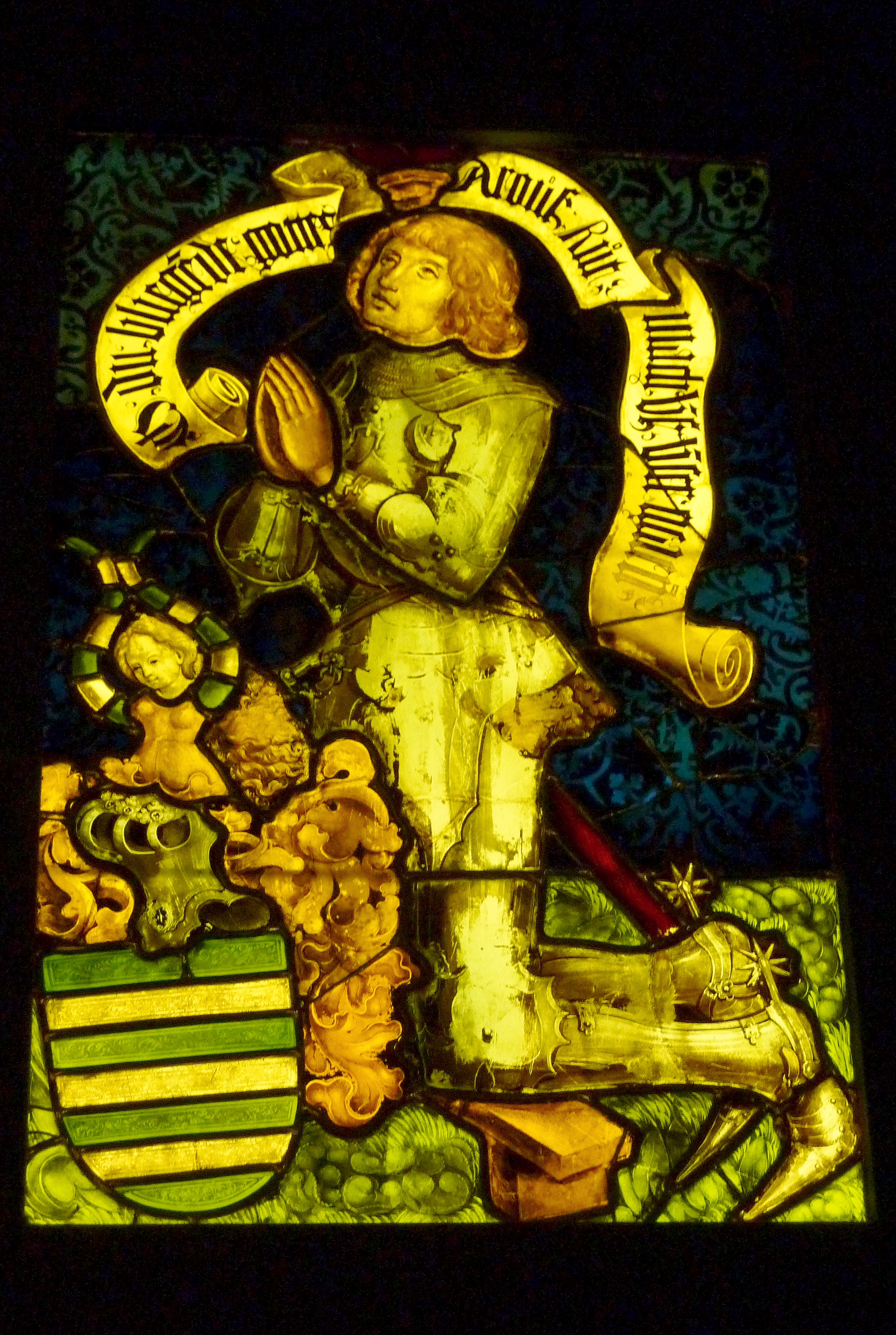
A Hemmel window at the Musée de Cluny

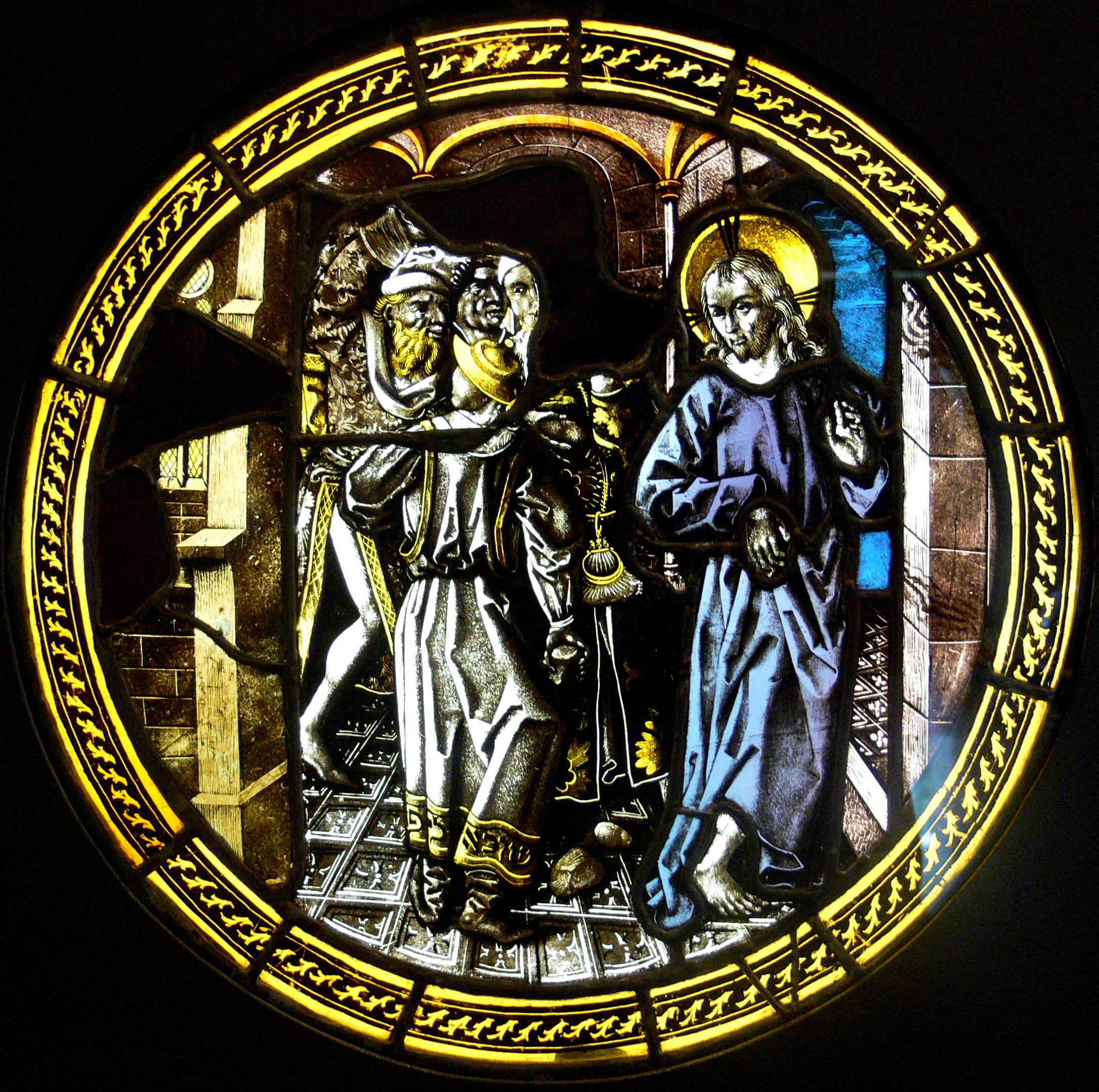
A Hemmel window at the Kunstgewerbemuseum Berlin

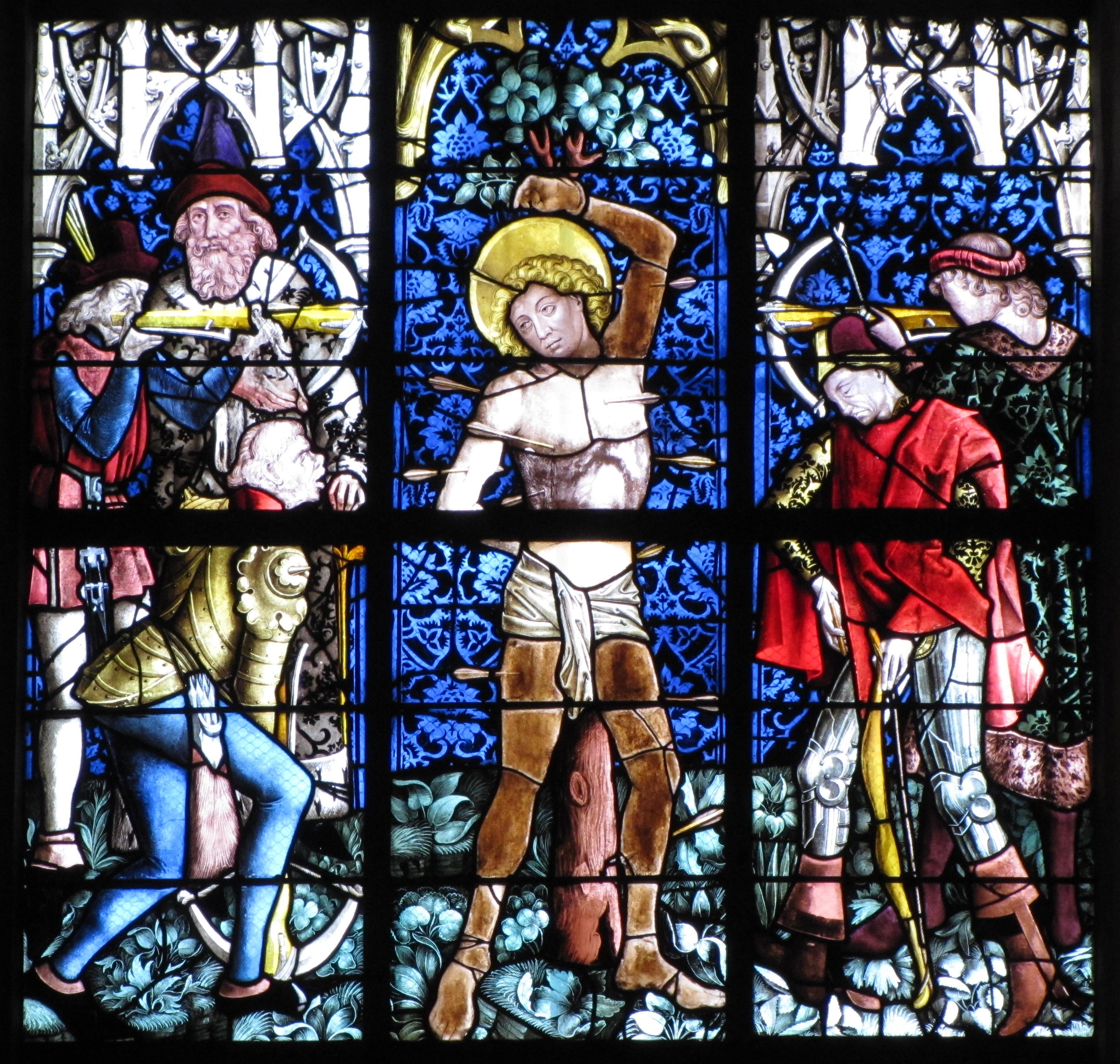
An original Hemmel window integrated into a larger 19th-century Neogothic window, Église Saints-Pierre-et-Paul, Obernai

== Bibliography ==
- (in German) Hermann Baumhauer, Joachim Feist: Das Ulmer Münster und seine Kunstwerke, Konrad Theiss Verlag, Stuttgart und Aalen 1977, ISBN 3-8062-0164-1
- (in German) Erhard John: Die Glasmalereien im Ulmer Münster, Langenau 1999, ISBN 3-88360-067-9
- (in German) Lawrence Lee; George Seddon; Francis Stephens: Die Welt der Glasfenster - Zwölf Jahrhunderte abendländischer Glasmalerei in über 500 Farbbildern, Farbbilder von: Sonia Halliday, Laura Lushington, Orbis Verlag, München 1992, ISBN 3-572-00524-8
- (in German) Wolfgang Lipp: Begleiter durch das Ulmer Münster, Langenau 1999, ISBN 3-88360-011-3
- (in German) Heinz Merten: Andlau, Peter von. In: Neue Deutsche Biographie (NDB). Band 1, Duncker & Humblot, Berlin 1953, ISBN 3-428-00182-6, S. 270–272
- (in German) ADAC-Reiseführer: Elsass von 2005
