= Mariä Krönung (Lautenbach) =

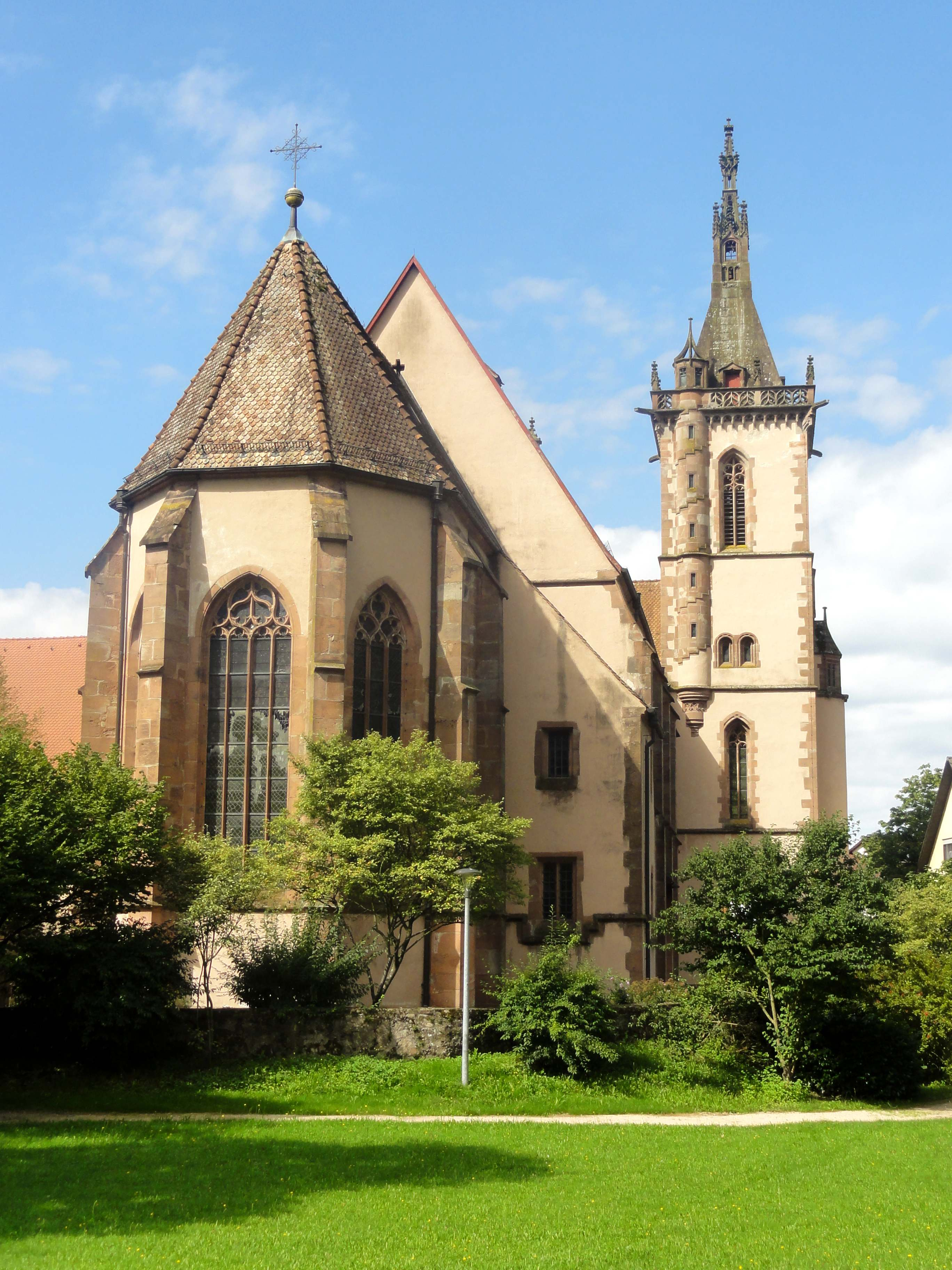
- Mariä Krönung in 2017

- 48°31′08″N 08°07′06″E
- Location: Lautenbach, Baden-Württemberg, Germany
- Denomination: Catholic
- Website: www.kath-oberkirch.de/html/content/wallfahrtskirche_mariae_kroenung.html

History
- Dedication: Coronation of Mary, John the Baptist and John the Evangelist
- Consecrated: 1483

Architecture
- Style: Late-Gothic
- Completed: 1488

Administration
- Diocese: Freiburg

Mariä Krönung (Coronation of Mary) is a Catholic pilgrimage church in Lautenbach, Baden-Württemberg, Germany, where pilgrimage to a miraculous image of Mary was documented in the 14th century. The present church was built in the 15th century in Late-Gothic style, a home for Premonstratensian friars from a dissolved monastery. Mariä Krönung is a significant cultural monument in southern Germany, because it retains many original Gothic features, such as the rood loft and fused stained-glass windows. It has been the parish church of the village since 1815.

== History ==
Tradition says that a shepherd followed the singing of a wonderful voice to a hollow tree beside a spring, in which he found a statue of Mary, mother of Jesus. The site became a place of pilgrimage, and successive structures were built to house the statue. Records of the church site date from 1190. The statue has been venerated since at least the 1300s.

In 1303, the All Saints' Abbey charged with the church and its pilgrims. The current church was built to replace an older chapel. It was begun in 1471, in order to offer the increasing numbers of pilgrims a larger prayer room. The church was also intended to serve as a burial place for the local nobility. Construction was supported by local families belonging to the lower nobility, especially the Schauenburgs, as well as peasants. The first master builder was Hans Hertwig, who had learned his trade in Strasbourg.

The new church was consecrated in 1483 by Albrecht, Bishop of Strasbourg, and was completed in 1488. At the time of consecration, the friars of All Saints' Abbey took over the supervision of the building and its funding. The church is dedicated to the Coronation of Mary, John the Baptist and John the Evangelist.

In the 16th century, a two-storied hospitium was added to house pilgrims; it was later used as the parish house. In 1895, Max Meckel expanded the church, adding two bays and a neogothic steeple. Surprisingly, both church and parish house remained undamaged by the wars which ravaged the Rench valley over the centuries, including the Thirty Years' War, which devastated the region. The poverty that followed meant that the church was not renovated, preserving the original Gothic elements.

== Architecture ==
Mariä Krönung consists of a nave with six bays, crowned by a net vault. The steeple connects to the north side of the nave. The Gnadenkapelle (Chapel of Grace or Mercy), housing the statue of Mary, is located at the south side, at the location of the earlier chapel around which the church was built.

The rood screen separates the nave from the choir. When its two-winged gate is closed the choir serves as an intimate prayer room for the friars. The bells are still rung by hand; they consist of a peal of five bells poured in 1928, hung in the steeple, and one bell from the 1700s, hung from a ridge turret above the west gable (sound files).

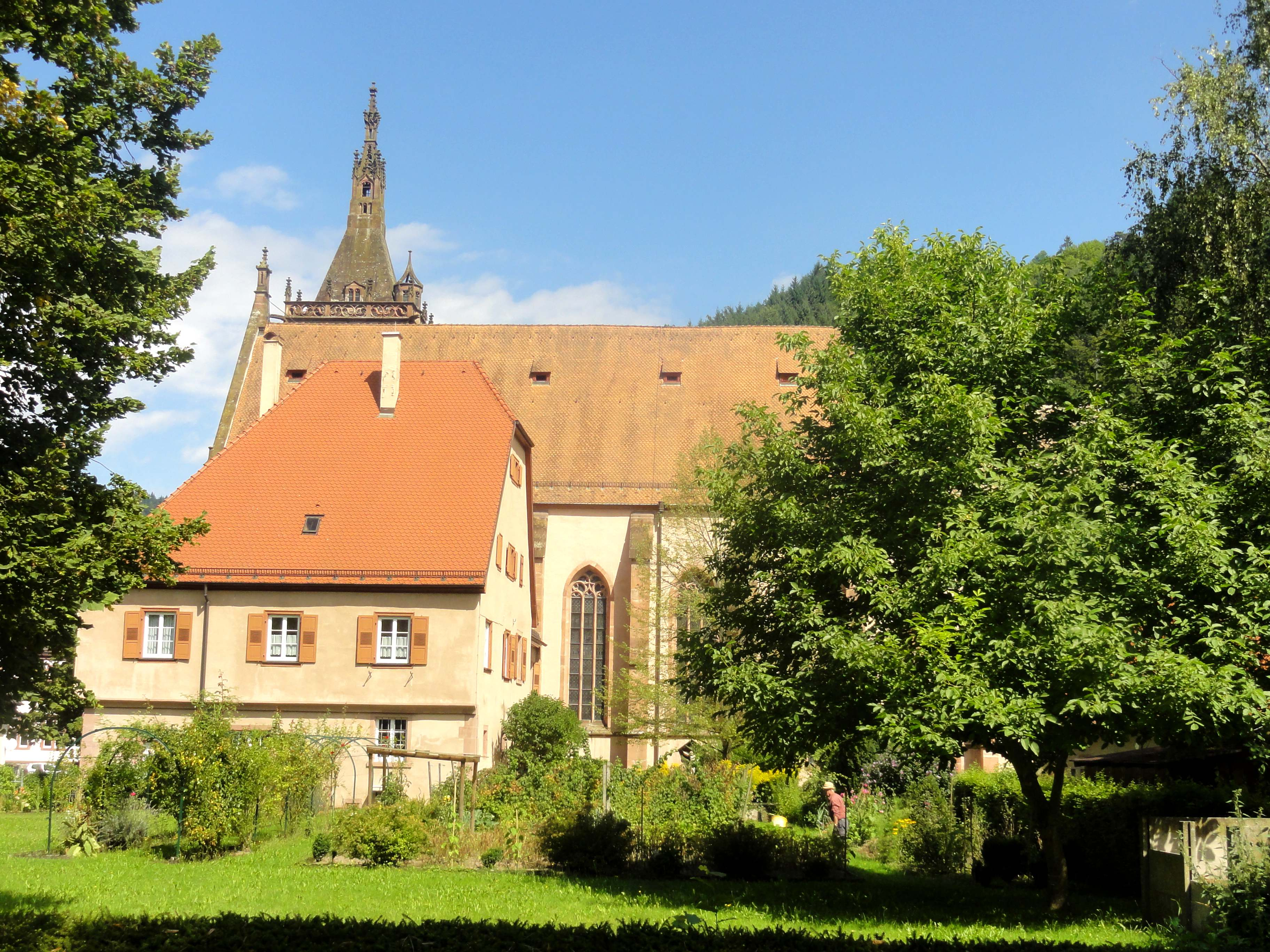
The 16th-century hospitium, now the parish house

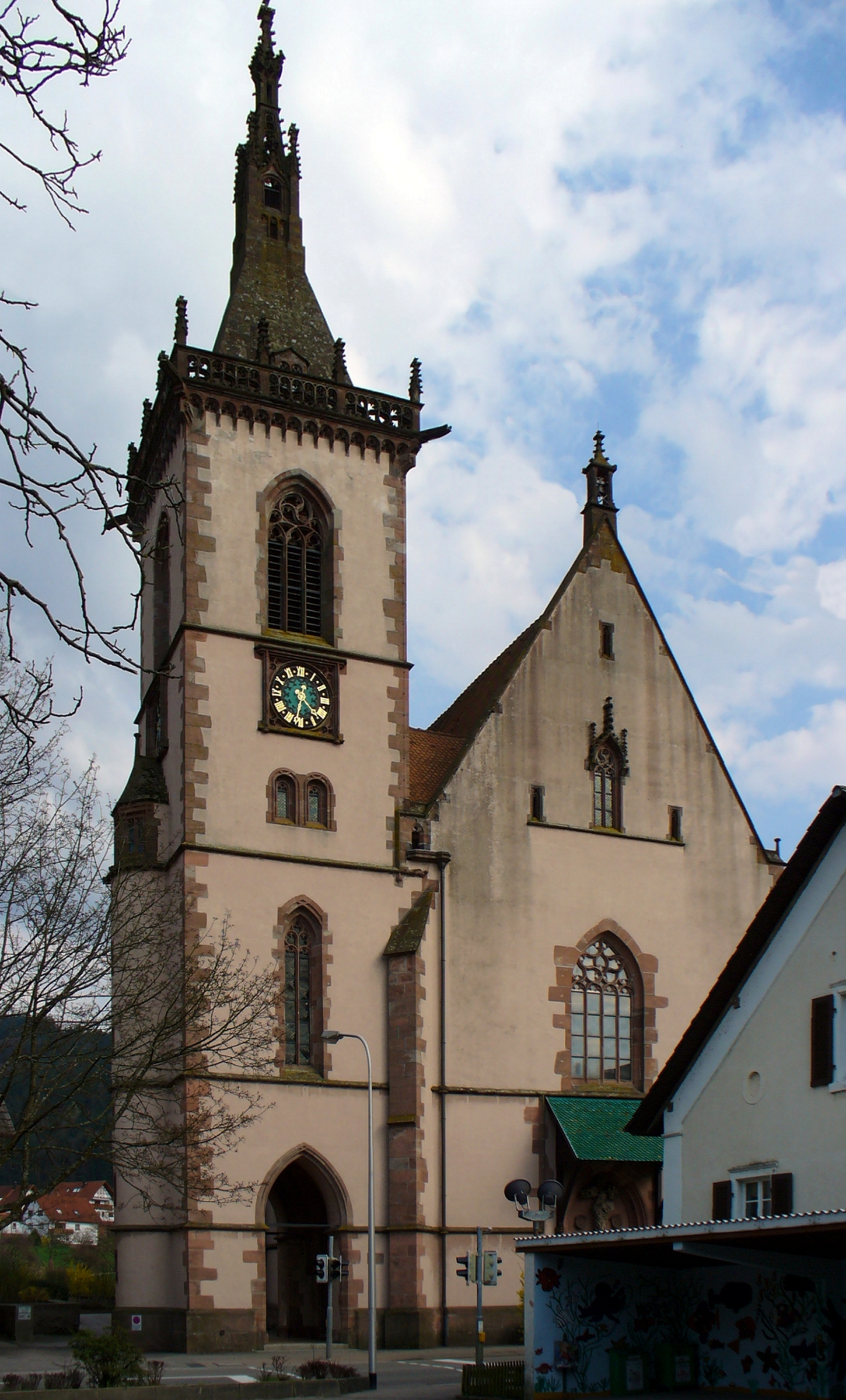
The 1895 steeple and extension

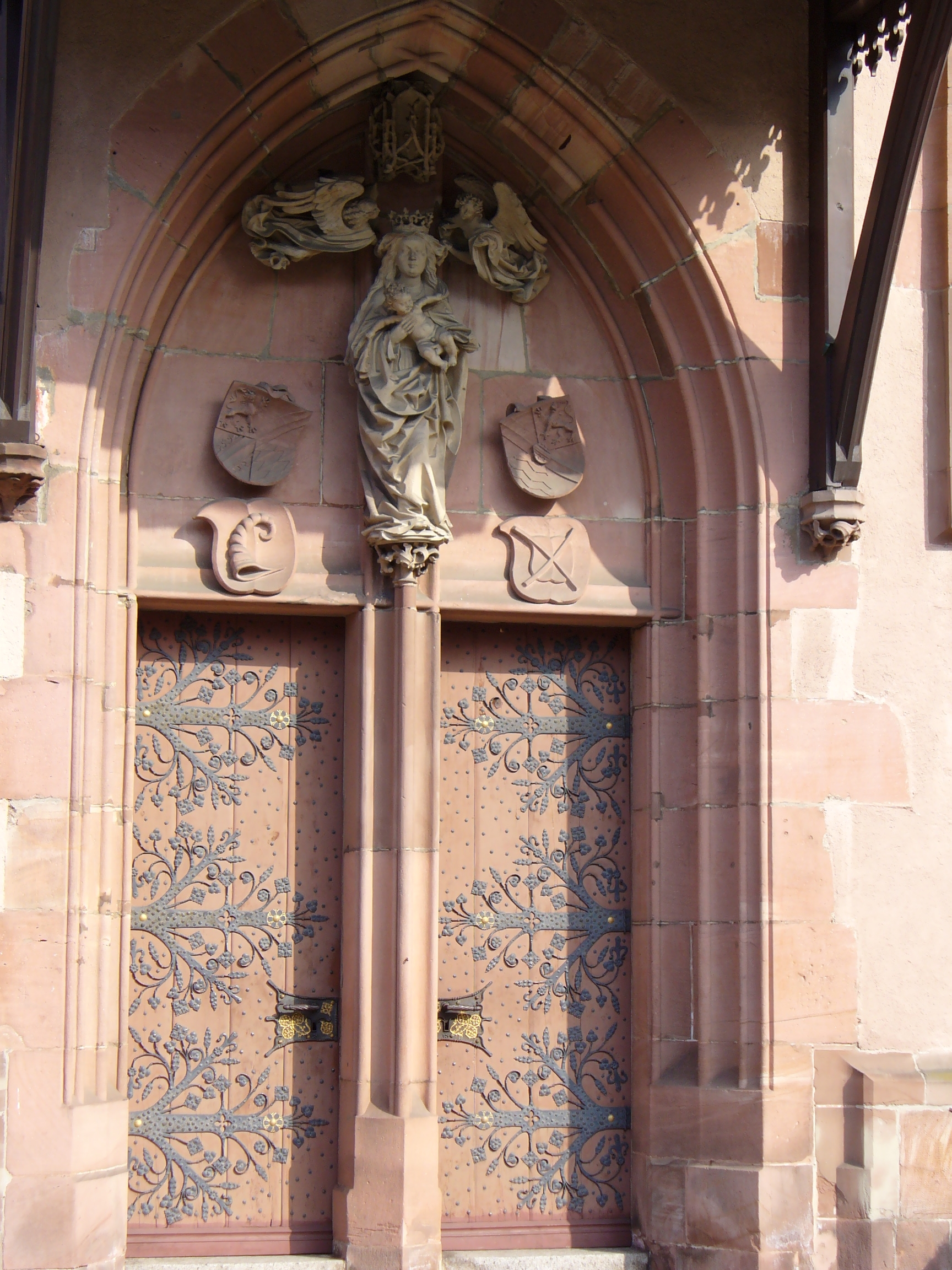
West entrance
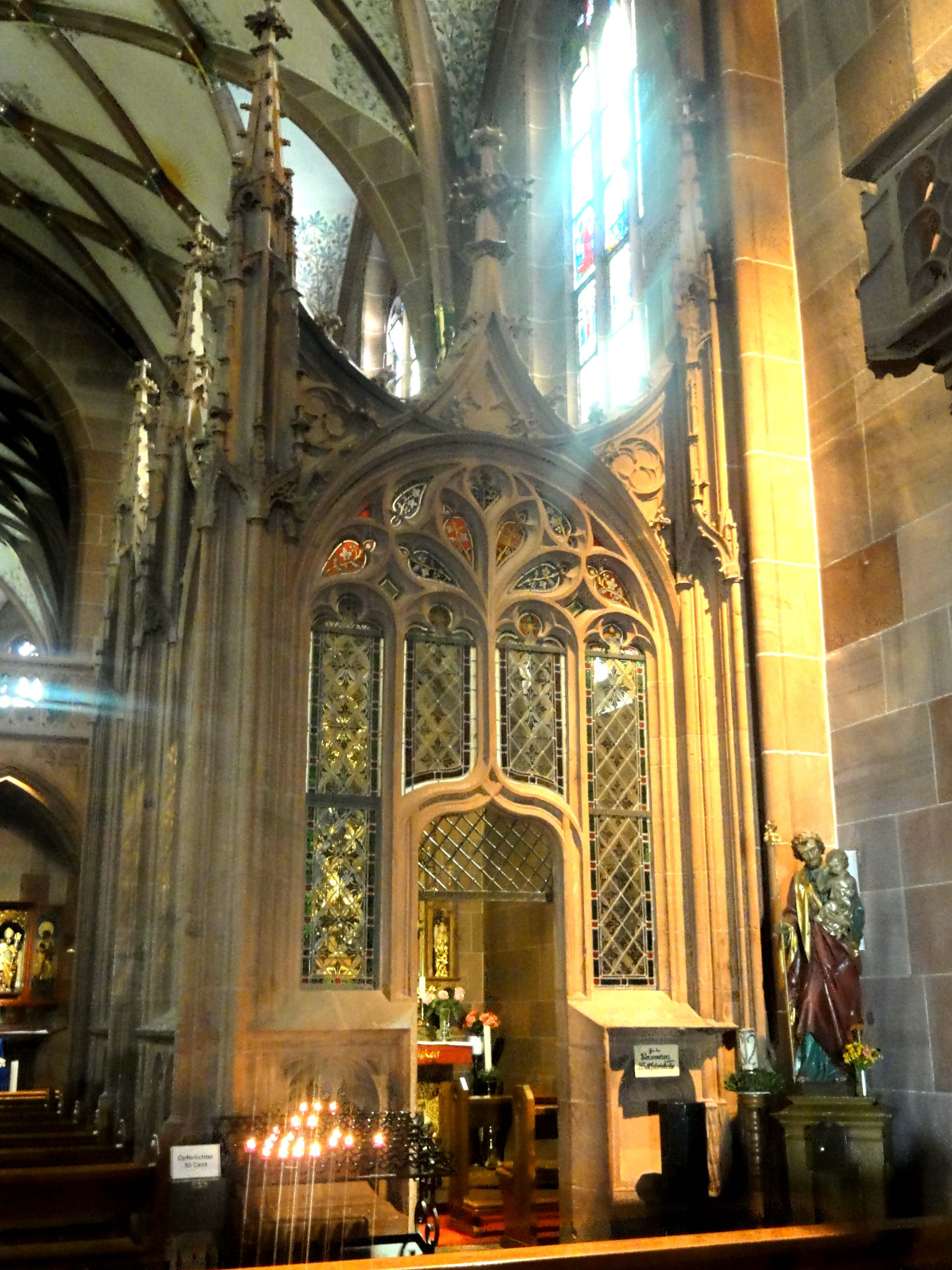
Exterior of Gnadenkapelle

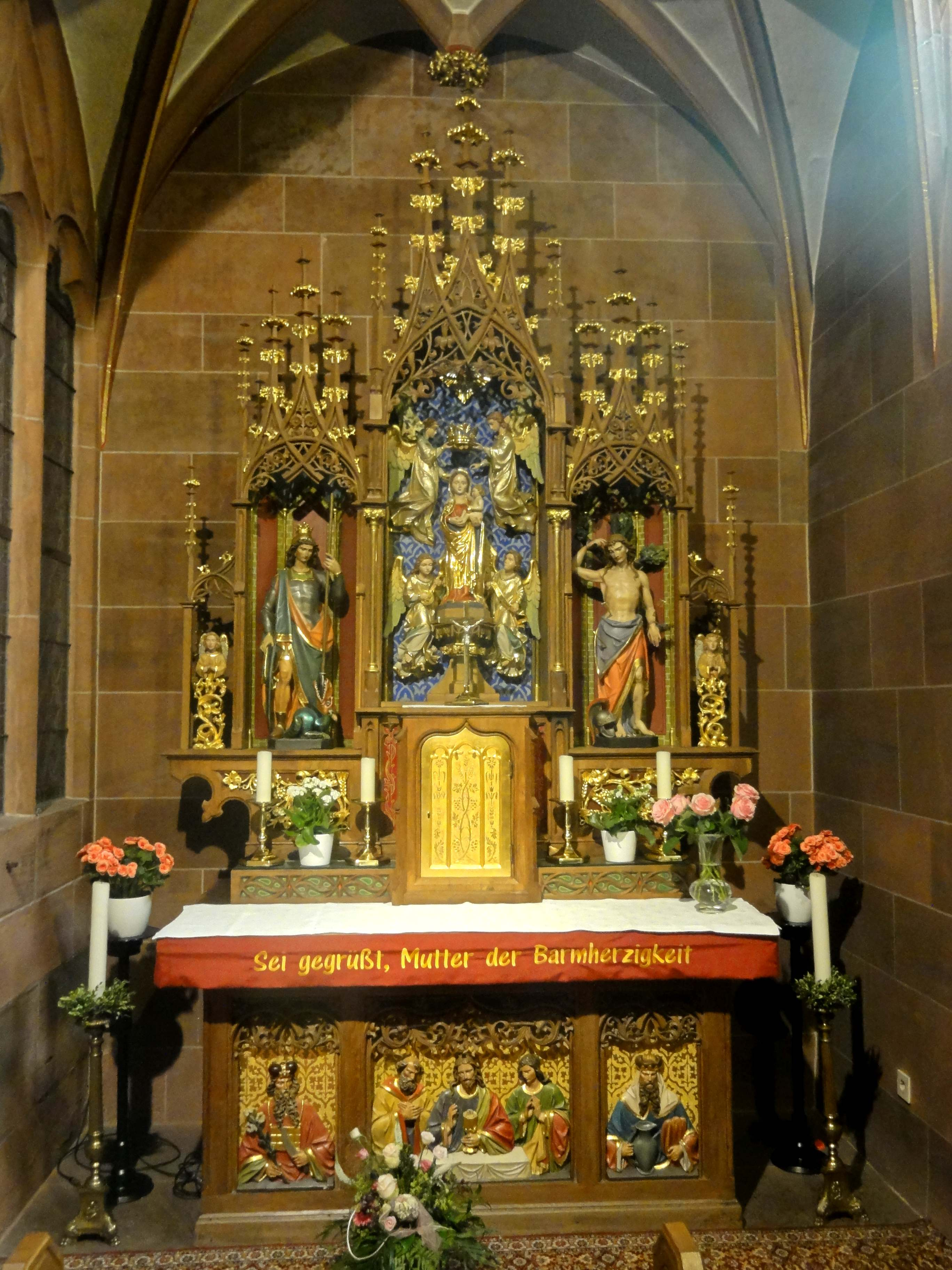
Interior of Gnadenkapelle, with statue of Mary

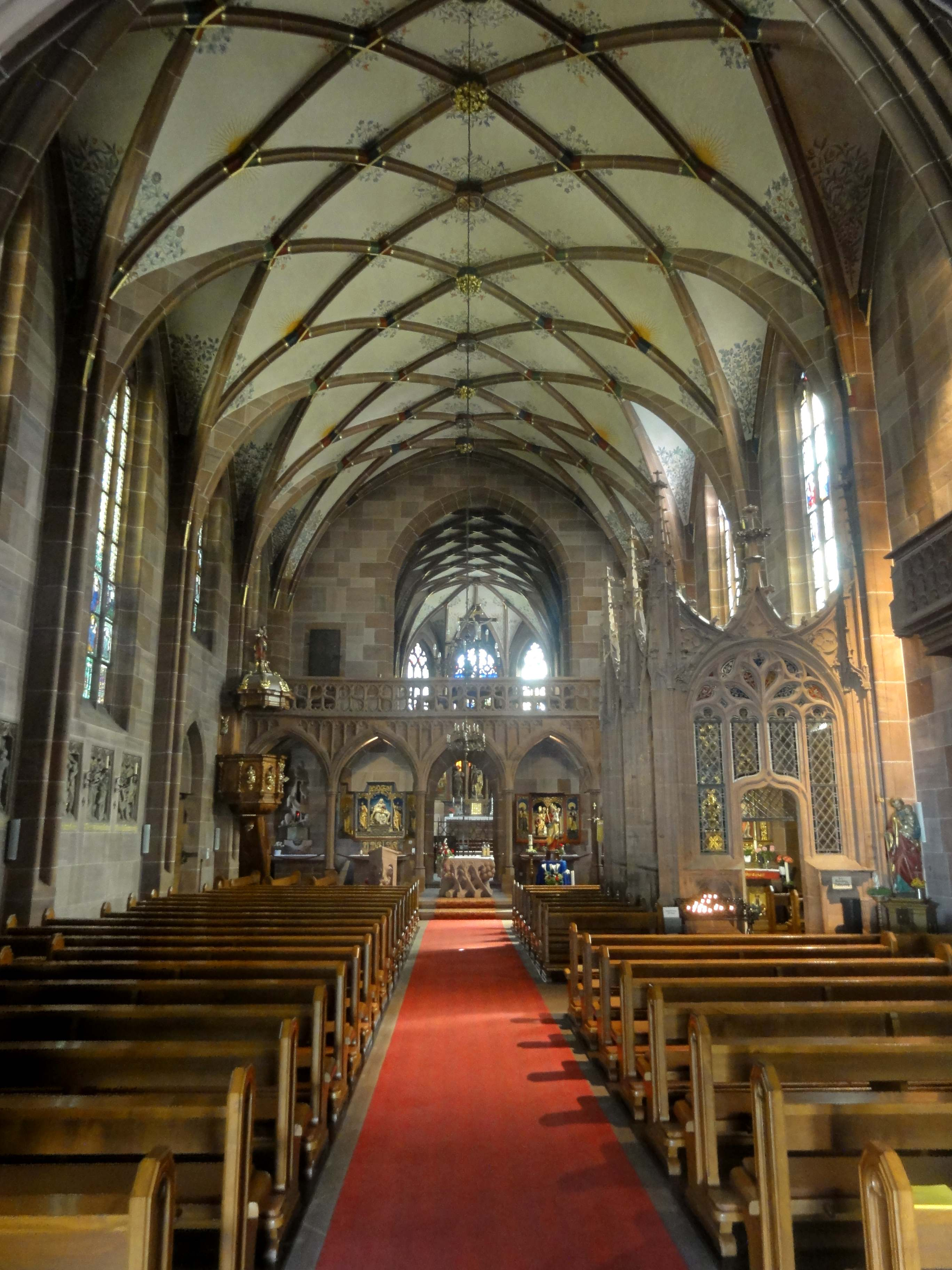
Rib vault with Gnadenkapelle

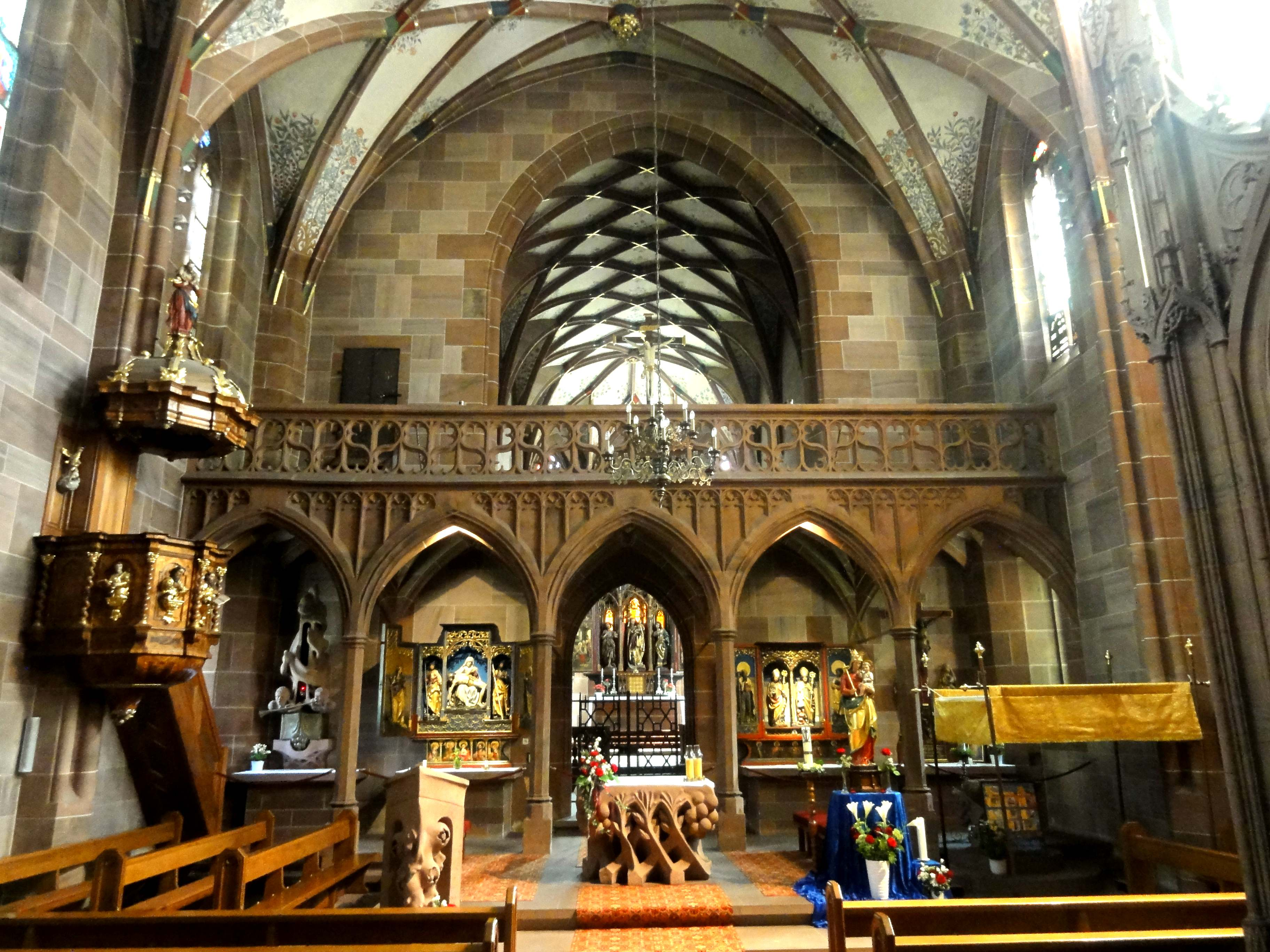
The rood loft

== Stained-glass windows ==
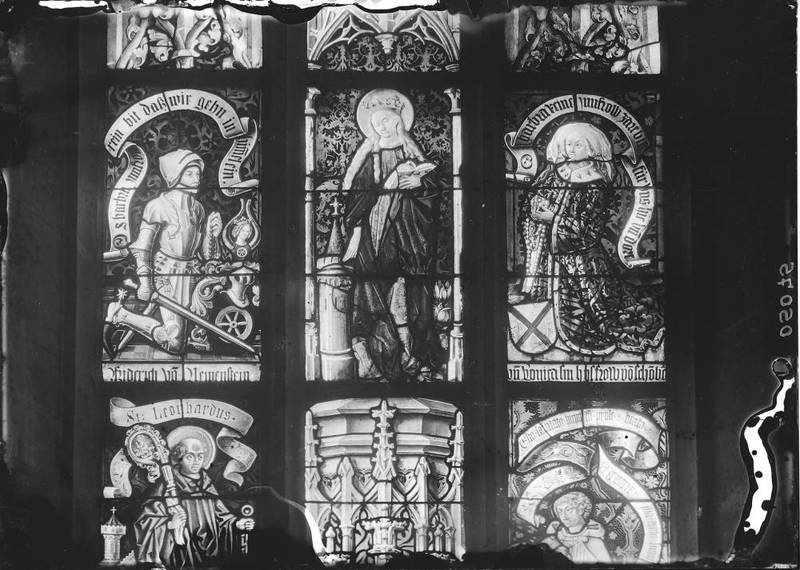
Saint Barbara flanked by donor portraits (black-and-white photo of coloured windows)

The 59 glass windows, created in the workshop of Peter Hemmel of Andlau, between 1480 and 1489, are of particular historic and cultural value. Stained-glass windows are usually made by joining pieces of coloured glass with H-shaped lead cames, a cold process. Here, however, the glaziers used glass fusing: pieces of coloured glass (60-80 per pane) were fitted into a mosaic on a piece of clear glass, and the stack was then gently heated to soften and fuse the layers without melting them into a puddle. This is a difficult technique: it requires careful matching of the physical properties of the glass, to avoid internal stresses which can cause the glass to fail. However, done properly, it can produce a strong, even window pane. Details were painted onto the glass; traditional stained-glass window painting is lasting, as it uses a glass-fusible paint, fired before the pieces are assembled. The windows show religious themes, and include depictions of the donors.

== Altars ==
The high altar is believed to have been completed by 1488 when the church was consecrated. It is carved in the center and has paintings on two side panels by an unknown master of the Strasbourg school, known in art history as the Master of the Lautenbach Altar. It is believed to be the only pre-1500 altar of the Strasbourg school which survived both the Reformation and the French Revolution. Two side-altars, thought to be the work of the same artist, are located under the rood loft.

The statues of the altars were required to be covered during fasting-times and Advent; this is why the statues have wooden panels which can be closed over them. The exteriors of the panels carry paintings of the statues.

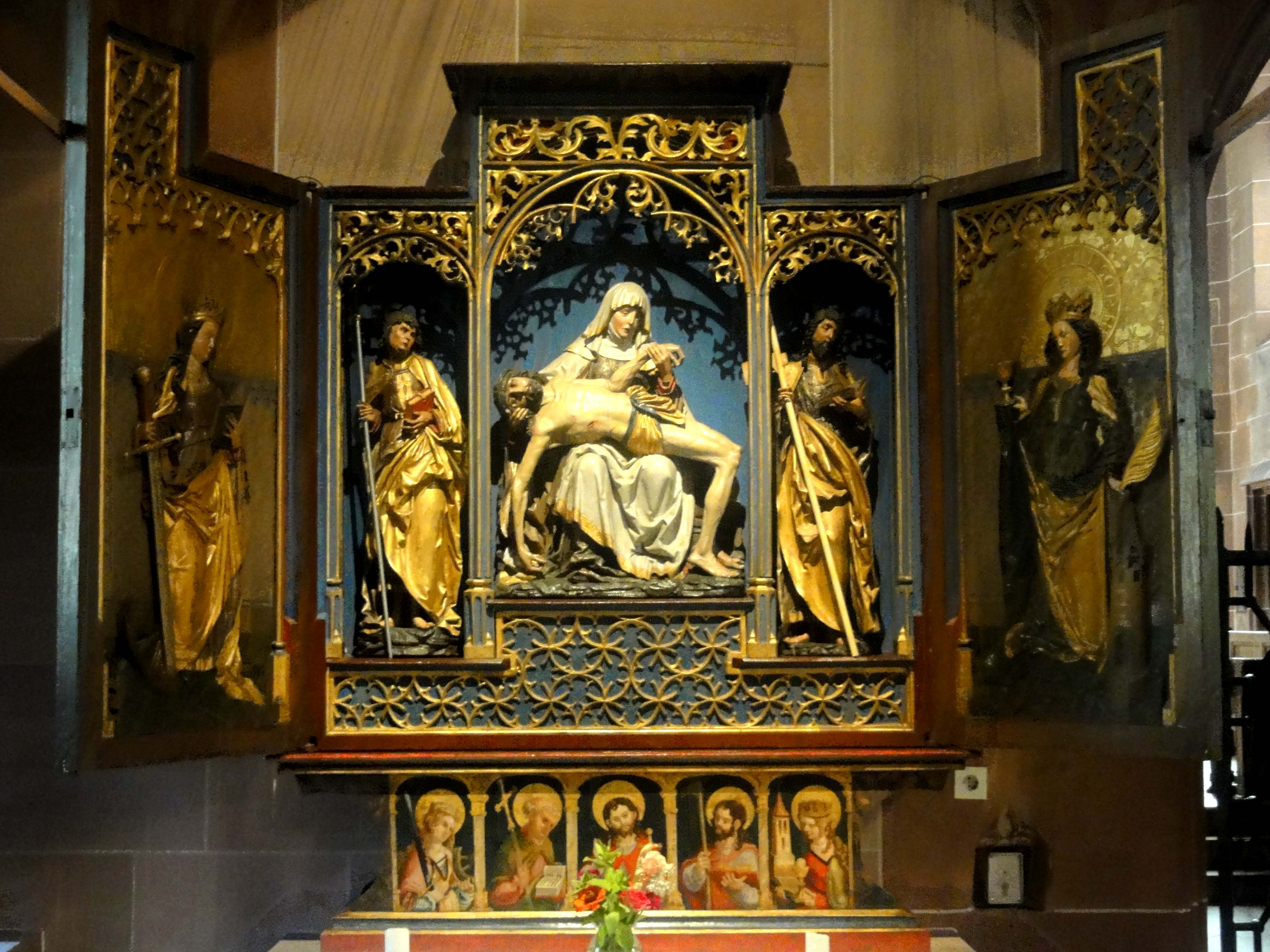
Left side altar

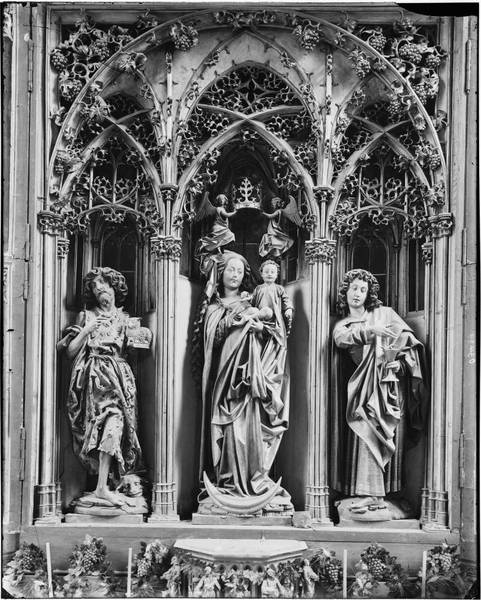
Statues of the high altar: Madonna on a crescent moon, with Johns Baptist and Evangelist (panel paintings).

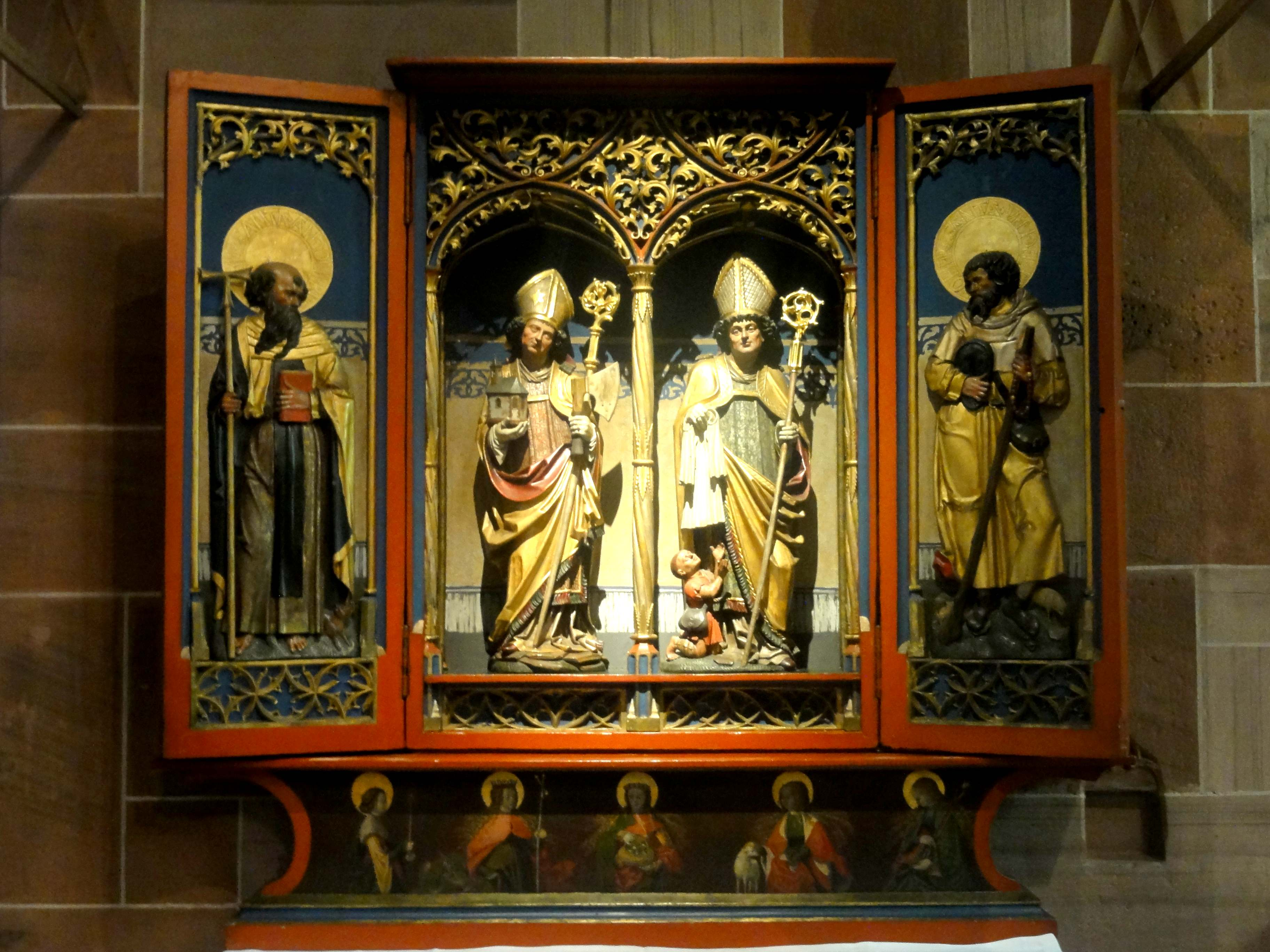
Right side altar

== Scholarly literature ==
- Dehio, Georg; Gall, Ernst (1997). Handbuch der deutschen Kunstdenkmäler: Baden-Württemberg (in German). Vol. 11. Munich: Deutscher Kunstverlag. p. 411. ISBN 3-422-03030-1. "Die Regierungsbezirke Freiburg und Tübingen"
