= Wolfgang Lipp =

German theologian (1939–2021)

- Born: 17 July 1939; Stuttgart, Germany
- Died: 30 October 2021 (aged 82); Ulm, Germany
- Occupation: Lutheran theologian

Wolfgang Lipp (17 July 1939 – 30 October 2021) was a German Lutheran theologian, pastor, university chaplain, academic and historian of art, architecture and culture.

== Works ==
=== Architecture and cultural history ===
- Der Weg nach Santiago - Jakobswege in Süddeutschland, Ulm 1991, ISBN 3-88294-164-2
- Bilder und Meditationen zum Marienportal des Ulmer Münsters, Langenau 1983, ISBN 3-88360-042-3.
- Begleiter durch das Ulmer Münster, Langenau 1999, ISBN 3-88360-011-3.
- Das Erbe des Jakobus. Zur Vorgeschichte und Geschichte, zur theologischen und religiösen Bedeutung der Jakobuswallfahrt. Mit einem Anhang über die deutschen Pilgerwege. Abbildungen und Fotografien von Fritjof Betz, Rainer Brockmann u.a., C&S Verlag, Laupheim 2008, ISBN 978-3-937876-18-4.

=== Theology ===
- Sterben - Anregungen eines Studientages zum Weiterdenken, edited by Wolfgang Lipp, Armin Vaas Verlag Langenau-Albeck, 1981, ISBN 3-88360-030-X
- Wer ist Gott? - 1. Korinther 13, in: Gottesdienstpraxis "Beerdigung" (ed. Erhard Domay), Gütersloh 1996, S. 103ff, ISBN 3-579-02981-9
- Wo aber der Geist des Herrn ist, da ist Freiheit - Predigten, Reutlingen 1999

== Sources ==
- Wolfgang Lipp in the DNB
- Wolfgang Lipp is LCCN n801-41898 at the Library of Congress
- VIAF on Wolfgang Lipp
