= Lautenbach (Ortenaukreis) =

- Municipality
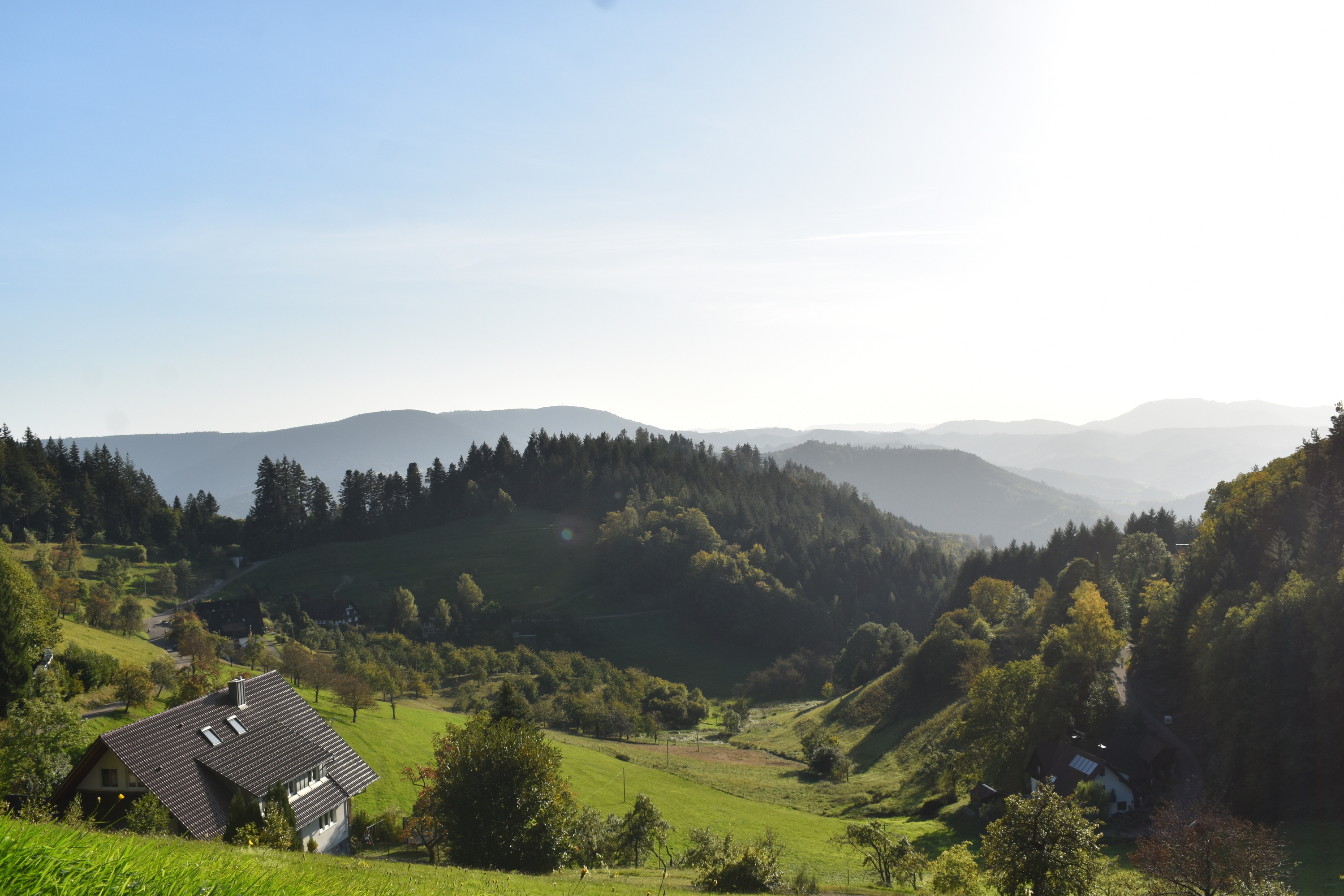
- The hamlet of Sohlberg, part of the Lautenbach municipality

- Coat of arms

- Location of Lautenbach within Ortenaukreis district
- Interactive map of Lautenbach
- Location within Germany Location within Baden-Württemberg
- Coordinates: 48°31′10″N 08°07′01″E
- Country: Germany
- State: Baden-Württemberg
- Admin. region: Freiburg
- District: Ortenaukreis

Government
  - Mayor (2015–23): Thomas Krechtler (CDU)

Area
  - Total: 21.54 km^{2} (8.32 sq mi)
- Elevation: 215 m (705 ft)

Population (2025-12-31)
  - Total: 1,968
  - Density: 91.36/km^{2} (236.6/sq mi)
- Time zone: UTC+01:00 (CET)
  - Summer (DST): UTC+02:00 (CEST)
- Postal codes: 77794
- Dialling codes: 07802
- Vehicle registration: OG, BH, KEL, LR, WOL
- Website: www.lautenbach-renchtal.de

Lautenbach (German pronunciation: [ˈlaʊtn̩bax]; Low Alemannic: Luddebach) is a municipality in the district of Ortenau in Baden-Württemberg, Germany. It has a Gothic pilgrimage church, Mariä Krönung.
